= 2015–16 Slovak Cup =

Slovnaft cup

Tournament details
- Country: Slovakia
- Teams: 170

Final positions
- Champions: AS Trenčín
- Runners-up: Slovan Bratislava

The 2015–16 Slovak Cup, also known as Slovnaft Cup for sponsorship reasons, was the 47th edition of the competition. The winners of the competition will qualify for the first qualifying round of the 2016–17 UEFA Europa League.

== Teams ==
Round	Clubs remaining	Clubs involved	Winners from previous round	New entries this round	Leagues entering at this round	Scheduled playing date
First Round	170	92	0	182	5. Liga; 4. Liga; 3. Liga	25–26 July 2015; 29 July 2015; 2 August 2015
Second Round	124	120	96	46	DOXXbet liga Fortuna Liga	11–12 August 2015; 18–19 August 2015
Third Round	64	64	64	0	none	1 September 2015
Fourth Round	32	32	32	0	none	14 October 2015
Fifth Round	16	16	16	0	none	4 November 2015
Quarter-finals	8	8	8	0	none	15 March 2016
Semi-finals	4	4	4	0	none	5–13 April 2016
Final	2	2	2	0	none	29 April 2016

== First round ==
The matches took place on 24, 25, 26, 29 July and 5 and 6 August 2015.

Team 1	Score	Team 2
ŠK Šenkvice (4)	3–2	FK Karpaty Limbach (4)
ŠK Závod (4)	3–1	FK Jablonové (4)
FC Ružinov Bratislava	w/o	FK Tatran Stupava
FK Vajnory (4)	3–1	ŠK Vrakuňa Bratislava (4)
TJ Čunovo Bratislava (4)	0–0 (3–4 p)	MFK Rusovce (4)
FK Lamač Bratislava (4)	3–2	TJ Veľké Leváre (4)
TJ Družstevník Zvončín (5)	1–1 (3–5 p)	OŠK Trenčianske Stankovce (4)
ŠK Želiezovce (4)	1–4	KFC Komárno (3)
OFK Dynamo Malženice (4)	3–0	MFK Vrbové (4)
FK Activ Komárno (5)	0–6	FK Kolárovo (4)
ŠK Tvrdošovce (4)	1–6	ŠK Šurany (4)
TJ Partizán Cigeľ (5)	1–2	Baník HN Prievidza & Handlová (3)
TJ Partizán Domaniža (4)	0–0 (4–3 p)	ŠK LR Crystal Lednické Rovne (3)
ŠK Nevidzany (5)	3–2	FK Slovan Levice (4)
MŠO Štúrovo (4)	0–3	FKM Nové Zámky (3)
MFK Nová Dubnica (4)	2–0	TJ KOVO Beluša (4)
FK Močenok (5)	2–2 (4–3 p)	TJ Imeľ (4)
ŠK Blava 1928 (4)	1–0	TJ Slavoj Boleráz (4)
OŠK Baník Stráňavy (4)	4–0	FK Čadca (3)
OŠK Radzovce (5)	1–2	ŠK Vinica (4)
TJ Lovča (5)	2–0	ŠK Dynamo Diviaky (4)
TJ Fatran Varín (5)	0–0 (4–2 p)	MŠK Kysucké Nové Mesto (4)
FK Slovan Trstená (4)	0–6	ŠKM Liptovský Hrádok (3)
ŠK Turčianska Štiavnička (5)	1–1 (3–2 p)	ŠK Závažná Poruba (4)
FK Tempo Partizánske (4)	1–4	MFK Topvar Topoľčany (3)
TJ Tatran VLM Pliešovce (4)	0–2	FK Slovenské Ďarmoty (4)
ATTACK Vrútky (4)	0–4	FO Bytča (3)
FK Predmier (5)	2–0	TJ Tatran Bytčica (4)
FK Jesenské (5)	4–2	MFK Spartak Hriňová (4)
FK Slávia Staškov (4)	5–2	MŠK Námestovo (3)
TJ Oravan Oravská Jasenica (5)	0–4	Družstevník Liptovská Štiavnica (3)
TJ Sokol Medzibrod (4)	3–1	MFK Žarnovica (3)
FK FC Baník Veľký Krtíš (4)	0–3	MFK Detva (3)
TJ Máj Ružomberok-Černová (4)	1–2	JUPIE Podlavice Badín (4)
FK Sokol Braväcovo (5)	2–1	MFK Revúca (4)
OK Častkovce (4)	3–1	MŠK Slovan Trenčianske Teplice (4)
FC Slovan Divín (4)	0–0 (3–1 p)	FTC Fiľakovo (4)
ŠK Prameň Kováčová (4)	0–4	MFK Nová Baňa (3)
FC Malacky (4)	6–0	TJ Záhoran Jakubov (4)
SDM Domino Bratislava (4)	0–3	SFC Kalinkovo (4)
TJ Partizán Prečín (4)	3–0	MŠK Púchov (3)
ŠK Tvrdošín (4)	0–1	TJ Tatran Krásno nad Kysucou (3)
ŠK Belá (5)	2–3	TJ Stráža (4)
ŠK Veľké Zálužie (5)	0–5	FC Slovan Galanta (3)
TJ Družstevník Bešeňov (5)	2–5	KFC Kalná nad Hronom (4)
OŠK Rudina (5)	1–2	TJ Tatran Oravské Veselé (4)

== Second round ==
The matches took place on 11, 12, 18, 19, and 25 August 2015.

Team 1	Score	Team 2
KFC Komárno (3)	1–6	MŠK - Thermál Veľký Meder (3)
TJ Tatran Krásno nad Kysucou (3)	1–1 (5–4 p)	MFK Skalica (1)
FK Slovan Nemšová (3)	2–0	TJ OFC Gabčíkovo (3)
FK Lamač Bratislava (4)	1–6	ŠK Senec (2)
FC ŠTK 1914 Šamorín (3)	0–3	OFK Dunajská Lužná (2)
ŠK Šenkvice (4)	2–12	FO ŽP Šport Podbrezová (1)
JUPIE Podlavice Badín (4)	0–1	ŠK Javorník Makov (3)
PŠC Pezinok (3)	0–5	FK AS Trenčín (1)
FK Slovan Most pri Bratislave (3)	1–2	FC ViOn Zlaté Moravce (1)
TJ Domaniža (4)	0–2	FK Senica (1)
FK Kolárovo (4)	0–4	FC Spartak Trnava (1)
OŠK Trenčianske Stankovce (4)	0–3	Spartak Myjava (1)
TJ Sokol Medzibrod (4)	1–2	MFK Zemplín Michalovce (1)
ŠK Strážske (4)	0–9	MŠK Žilina (1)
ŠK Závod (4)	1–0	Lokomotíva Devínska Nová Ves (3)
FC Ružinov Bratislava (4)	0–3	FK Rača (3)
FC Malacky (4)	5–0	FO ŠK Lozorno (3)
FK Inter Bratislava (3)	0–6	ŠKF Sereď (2)
TJ Slovan Viničné (3)	3–3 (3–4 p)	FK Slovan Ivanka pri Dunaji (3)
MFK Rusovce (4)	1–4	ŠK Svätý Jur (3)
MŠK Kráľová pri Senci (3)	1–3	TJ Iskra Borčice (2)
OŠK Slovenský Grob (3)	0–9	FK Pohronie (2)
SFC Kalinkovo (4)	3–3 (4–3 p)	ŠK Bernolákovo (3)
FK Vajnory (4)	2–3	FC Rohožník (3)
KFC Kalná nad Hronom (4)	2–0	FK Slovan Duslo Šaľa (2)
ŠK Nevidzany (4)	0–2	AFC Nové Mesto nad Váhom (2)
FC Slovan Galanta (3)	6–2	FC Neded (3)
FK Močenok (5)	0–5	ŠK Blava 1928 (4)
MFK Nová Dubnica (4)	1–2	FKM Nové Zámky (3)
OFK Malženice (4)	1–6	FC Nitra (1)
OK Častkovce (4)	0–1	OTJ Palárikovo (3)
ŠK Šurany (4)	1–2	MFK Topvar Topoľčany (3)
MFK Nová Baňa (3)	4–0	FO Kinex Bytča (3)
FK Predmier (5)	1–1 (4–2 p)	Partizán Bardejov (2)
FK Jesenské (5)	1–2	MŠK Fomat Martin (3)
FK Staškov (4)	2–5	OŠK Baník Stráňavy (4)
TJ Lovča (5)	0–3	ŠK Vinica (4)
ŠKM Liptovský Hrádok (3)	0–0 (4–3 p)	FK Poprad (2)
ŠK Turčianska Štiavnička (5)	4–0	FC Slovan Divín (4)
TJ Stráža (4)	1–0	Družstevník Liptovská Štiavnica (3)
MFK Detva (3)	1–3	OFK Teplička nad Váhom (3)
OŠFK Šarišské Michaľany (4)	1–0	Družstevník Veľký Horeš (4)
FK Bodva Moldava nad Bodvou (3)	0–0 (1–3 p)	MFK Vranov nad Topľou (3)
FK Pokrok SEZ Krompachy (4)	1–5	MFK Lokomotíva Zvolen (2)
FK Svit (4)	0–1	MFK Snina (3)
TJ Družstevník Vyšný Mirošov (4)	1–0	TJ Sokol Ľubotice (4)
OFK Tatran Kračúnovce (4)	0–2	FK Haniska (2)
SP MFK Rožňava (4)	1–2	FK Spišská Nová Ves (2)
MŠK Tatran Spišské Vlachy (4)	1–1 (2–4 p)	FK Čaňa (4)
TJ Družstevník Veľké Ludince (3)	w/o	MFK Dubnica (3)
ŠK Tomášov (3)	3–2	TJ Rovinka (3)
FK Sokol Braväcovo (5)	0–8	MFK Dolný Kubín (2)
TJ Družstevník Perín (5)	0–8	1. FC Tatran Prešov (2)
FK Slovenské Ďarmoty (4)	1–2	FC Lokomotíva Košice (2)
TJ Fatran Varín (5)	0–8	ŠK Slovan Bratislava (1)
AŠK Maria Huta Gelnica (4)	1–5	TJ FK Vyšné Opátske (3)
MŠK Tesla Stropkov (3)	0–3	FC DAC 1904 Dunajská Streda (1)
TJ Partizán Prečín (4)	3–2	Baník HN Prievidza & Handlová (3)
ŠK Báhoň (3)	0–5	FK Dukla Banská Bystrica (2)
TJ Tatran Oravské Veselé (4)	3–1	MŠK Rimavská Sobota (3)

== Third round ==
The matches took place on 1 September 2015. All times are CET (UTC+1).

1 September 2015	Tomášov (3)	1–0	Rača (2)	Tomášov
16:30	Jovanović 51'			Stadium: ŠK Tomášov stadium Attendance: 200; Referee: Mário Bohun

1 September 2015	Ivanka pri Dunaji (3)	2–6	Sereď (2)	Ivanka pri Dunaji
16:30	Bujna 4'; Jurč 75'		Hutta 16', 34', 54'; Balážik 19'; Poluch 20'; Chidi 66'	Stadium: Štadión FK Slovan; Attendance: 100; Referee: Pavel Ochotnický

1 September 2015	Svätý Jur (3)	1–3	Zlaté Moravce (1)	Svätý Jur
16:30	Angelovič 51'		Jhonnes 24', 42'; Krznarić 90'	Stadium: Štadión ŠK Svätý Jur; Attendance: 420; Referee: Jozef Pavlík

1 September 2015	Senec (2)	0–1	Borčice (2)	Senec
16:30			Barčík 46'	Stadium: NTC Stadion; Attendance: 150; Referee: Michal Perašín

1 September 2015	Kalná nad Hronom (4)	0–2	Nové Mesto nad Váhom (2)	Kalná nad Hronom
16:30			Belic 35'; Šebek 75'	Stadium: KFC Kalná nad Hronom stadium Attendance: 322; Referee: Anton Ihring

1 September 2015	Galanta (3)	1–2	Senica (1)	Galanta
16:30	Sukisa 20'		Kalabiška 60'; Hlohovský 90'	Stadium: Štadión FC Slovan Galanta; Attendance: 752; Referee: Adam Somoláni

1 September 2015	Jaslovské Bohunice (4)	2–1	Veľké Ludince (3)	Jaslovské Bohunice
16:30	Broš 30', 38'		Hlaváčik 27'	Stadium: Štadión Jaslovské Bohunice; Attendance: 250; Referee: Pavol Patrovič

1 September 2015	FK Predmier (5)	0–4	Martin (3)	Predmier
16:30			Thomka 8', 30'; Facuna 44'; Gábor 58'	Stadium: Štadión FK Predmier; Attendance: 400; Referee: Ján Rojček

1 September 2015	Oravské Veselé (4)	0–2	OŠK Baník Stráňavy (4)	Oravské Veselé
16:30			Hrbek 14', 54'	Stadium: Futbalový štadión TJ Tatran Oravské Veselé; Attendance: 250; Referee: Miroslav Fajčík

1 September 2015	Liptovský Hrádok (3)	0–1	Dolný Kubín (2)	Liptovský Hrádok
16:30			Laura 44'	Stadium: Stadium pri Belej Liptovský Hrádok; Attendance: 700; Referee: Peter Korista

1 September 2015	Turčianska Štiavnička (5)	0–4	TJ Stráža (4)	Turčianska Štiavnička
16:30			Racko 43'; Kúděla 56'; Prince 62'; Večeřa 82'	Stadium: ŠK Turčianska Štiavnička stadium Attendance: 500; Referee: Richard Halfar

1 September 2015	Teplička nad Váhom (3)	0–2	Michalovce (1)	Teplička nad Váhom
16:30			Danko 32'; Hamuľak 37'	Stadium: Stadium OFK Teplička nad Váhom; Attendance: 350; Referee: Kamil Horváth

1 September 2015	Makov (3)	4–0	Krásno nad Kysucou (3)	Makov
16:30	Pavlica 2', 32'; Šmahajčík 84'; Polka 89'			Stadium: Stadium ŠK Javorník Makov; Attendance: 300; Referee: Roman Ligas

1 September 2015	Šarišské Michaľany (4)	0–7	Ružomberok (1)	Šarišské Michaľany
16:30			Daghbashyan 12'; Maslo 21'; Zošák 30'; Jakubko 42'; Miklós 49'; Faško 54'; Masaryk 67'	Stadium: Stadium Za Torysou; Attendance: 1,800; Referee: Roland Weiss

1 September 2015	Vyšné Opátske (3)	1–1 (4–3 p)	Vranov nad Topľou (3)	Vyšné Opátske
16:30	Tkáč 11'		Dvorjak 28'	Stadium: Štadión Vyšné Opátske; Attendance: 150; Referee: Ján Mano

1 September 2015	Snina (3)	0–1	Zvolen (2)	Snina
16:30			Maroš Balko 31'	Stadium: Mestský futbalový štadión Attendance: 850; Referee: Patrik Kmec

1 September 2015	Spartak Medzev (4)	0–4	Košice (2)	Medzev
16:30			Pavúk 32'; Horodník 66'; Gáll 73'; Bavolár 89'	Stadium: Štadión MFK Spartak Medzev; Attendance: 300; Referee: Michal Čiernik

1 September 2015	Družstevník Vyšný Mirošov (4)	1–1 (1–3 p)	Dunajská Streda (1)	Vyšný Mirošov
16:30	Kovalčík 22'		Vateha 76' (o.g.)	Stadium: Stadium Družstevník Vyšný Mirošov; Attendance: 1,637; Referee: Filip Glova

1 September 2015	Haniska (2)	1–1 (5–6 p)	Prešov (2)	Haniska
16:30	Pekár 88'		Leško 25'	Stadium: Štadión FK Haniska; Attendance: 510; Referee: Pavol Chmura

1 September 2015	FK Čaňa (4)	2–1	Spišská Nová Ves (2)	Čaňa
16:30	Lipnický 20'; Čigáš 84'		Zekucia 40'	Stadium: Stadium FK Čaňa; Attendance: 400; Referee: Peter Ziemba

1 September 2015	Nemšová (3)	0–2	Myjava (1)	Nemšová
17:00			Bilovský 72'; Sládek 82'	Stadium: Štadión Nemšová; Attendance: 350; Referee: Ladislav Prešinský

1 September 2015	Kalinkovo (4)	1–2	Pohronie (2)	Kalinkovo
17:00	Pacholek 49'		Abrahám 83'; Garaj 86'	Stadium: SFC Kalinkovo stadium Attendance: 180; Referee: Marián Vašš

1 September 2015	Malacky (4)	0–6	Podbrezová (1)	Malacky
17:00			Mehanović 12'; Žilák 39', 46'; Kochan 48'; Marinković 61'; Almaský 79'	Stadium: Futbalový štadión - Zámocký park Malacky; Attendance: 1,036; Referee: Marek Mastiš

2 September 2015	Rohožník (3)	1–1 (5–3 p)	Banská Bystrica (2)	Rohožník
17:00	Marek Zajíc 67'		Tomáš Zázrivec 45'	Stadium: FC Rohožník Stadium; Attendance: 620; Referee: Richard Sedlák

2 September 2015	Veľký Meder (3)	0–3	Nitra (2)	Veľký Meder
17:00			Morong 29'; Petráš 82'; Ivančík 83'	Stadium: Stadium Veľký Meder; Attendance: 330; Referee: Martin Dohál

2 September 2015	Palárikovo (3)	1–3	Dunajská Lužná (2)	Palárikovo
17:00	Španír 25'		Hrnčár 41'; Petrović 82' (o.g.); Bališ 88'	Stadium: Štadión OTJ Palárikovo; Attendance: 120; Referee: Pavol Piatka

2 September 2015	Partizán Prečín (4)	1–3	Topoľčany (3)	Prečín
17:00	Vicena 45'	Report	Jakubík 21', 54'; Rusinko 71'	Stadium: Štadión TJ Partizán Prečín; Attendance: 150; Referee: Zsolt Féher

2 September 2015	Nová Baňa (3)	0–0 (4–3 p)	Lokomotíva Košice (2)	Nová Baňa
17:00				Stadium: Stadium MFK Nová Baňa; Attendance: 300; Referee: Bystrík Nemček

8 September 2015	Nové Zámky (3)	0–4	Spartak Trnava (1)	Nové Zámky
16:30			Godál 15'; Harba 28', 49'; Majtán 30'	Stadium: Ladislav Ganczner Stadium; Attendance: 1,159; Referee: Marek Špaček

15 September 2015	ŠK Závod (4)	0–11	Trenčín (1)	Závod
16:00			Schet 25', 78'; Opatovský 33', 40', 86'; Wesley 34', 43'; Koolwijk 42'; Bala 50', 87'; Šalata 70'	Stadium: Štadión ŠK Závod; Attendance: 1,030; Referee: Pavol Šuniar

15 September 2015	ŠK Vinica (4)	0–8	Slovan Bratislava (1)	Vinica
16:00			Oršula 3', 25'; Peltier 10', 32'; Gašparovič 27'; Matejka 30'; Petreje 61'; Drienovský 76' (o.g.)	Stadium: Stadium ŠK Vinica; Attendance: 2,700; Referee: Michal Očenáš

30 September 2015	Liptovský Mikuláš (2)	0–4	Žilina (1)	Liptovský Mikuláš
16:00			Lukáš Čmelík 52', 62'; Haskić 77'; Jánošík 88'	Stadium: Stadium Liptovský Mikuláš; Attendance: 2,300; Referee: Július Straka

== Fourth round ==
Fourth round matches were played between 13, 14, 20 and 28 October 2015. All times are CET (UTC+1).

13 October 2015	VSS Košice (2)	3–0	Spartak Trnava (1)	Košice
14:30	Huk 14'; Dimun 25'; Serečin 57'	Report		Stadium: Štadión Lokomotívy v Čermeli; Attendance: 800; Referee: Boris Marhefka

13 October 2015	Zvolen (2)	0–2	Senica (1)	Zvolen
15:00		Report	Komara 52'; Dolný 57'	Stadium: MFK Lokomotíva Zvolen Stadium; Attendance: 700; Referee: Štefan Leško

13 October 2015	Jaslovské Bohunice (4)	0–3	Trenčín (1)	Jaslovské Bohunice
15:00		Report	Koolwijk 65' van Kessel 90'; Lawrence 90'	Stadium: ŠK Blava Jasl. Bohunice stadium Attendance: 450; Referee: Adam Somoláni

13 October 2015	Martin (3)	0–3	Zlaté Moravce (1)	Martin
15:00		Report	Školnik 74', 87'; Tawamba 80'	Stadium: Mestský športový štadión Martin; Attendance: 900; Referee: Filip Glova

13 October 2015	Sereď (2)	1–2	Myjava (1)	Sereď
15:30	Kráľ 84'	Report	Škutka 26'; Daniel 37'	Stadium: Športový futbalový štadión Sereď; Attendance: 240; Referee: Pavol Šuniar

14 October 2015	Rohožník (3)	1–1 (5–3 p)	Michalovce (1)	Rohožník
15:00	Zajíc 7'	Report	Hamuľak 59'	Stadium: Štadión FC Rohožník; Attendance: 650; Referee: Gabriel Michlian

14 October 2015	Tomášov (3)	2–3	Pohronie (2)	Tomášov
15:00	Doknić 8', 84'	Report	Páleník 39'; Abrahám 54', 80'	Stadium: Štadión ŠK Tomášov; Attendance: 85; Referee: Pavol Piatka

14 October 2015	OŠK Baník Stráňavy (4)	0–3	Dunajská Streda (1)	Stráňavy
15:00		Report	Štepanovský 47'; Jurčo 51'; Brašeň 83'	Stadium: Štadión OŠK Baník Stráňavy; Attendance: 700; Referee: Kamil Horváth

14 October 2015	Vyšné Opátske (3)	1–0	Nová Baňa (3)	Vyšné Opátske
15:00	Maďarik 61'	Report		Stadium: Štadión Turkon Vyšné Opátske; Attendance: 300; Referee: Ľuboš Kačenga

14 October 2015	Makov (3)	3–10	Prešov (2)	Makov
15:00	Pavlica 1'; Janita 61'; Šmahajčík 87'	Report	Katona 11', 34', 37'; Šafranko 25', 47', 50'; Leško 44', 88'; Voda 64'; Keresteš 82'	Stadium: Štadión ŠK Javorník Makov; Attendance: 325; Referee: Bystrík Nemček

14 October 2015	FC Stráža (4)	1–1 (3–5 p)	Dolný Kubín (2)	Stráža
15:00	Večeřa 17'	Report	Perexta 79' (o.g.)	Stadium: Štadión TJ Stráža; Attendance: 300; Referee: Rastislav Jurenka

14 October 2015	FK Čaňa (4)	2–6	Topoľčany (3)	Čaňa
15:00	Steininger 77'; Lipnický 90'	Report	Kaman 11', 26'; Švajlen 36', 85', 86'; Baláž 40'	Stadium: Štadión FK Čaňa; Attendance: 250; Referee: Michal Čiernik

14 October 2015	Nové Mesto nad Váhom (2)	1–1 (5–3 p)	Podbrezová (1)	Nové Mesto nad Váhom
15:00	Belic 54' (pen.)	Report	Mehanović 82'	Stadium: Mestský štadión NMnV; Attendance: 200; Referee: Peter Kráľovič

14 October 2015	Dunajská Lužná (2)	2–7	Ružomberok (1)	Dunajská Lužná
15:30	Nosko 74', 80'	Report	Zošák 4'; Masaryk 38', 44', 83'; Lačný 40'; Faško 84'; Boszorád 88'	Stadium: NTC Dunajská Lužná; Attendance: 220; Referee: Jozef Pavlík

20 October 2015	FC Nitra (2)	2–3	Slovan Bratislava (1)	Nitra
17:30	Paukner 11'; Šmehyl 47'	Report	Priskin 22'; Zreľák 36', 61'	Stadium: Štadión pod Zoborom; Attendance: 640; Referee: Roland Weiss

28 October 2015	Borčice (2)	0–3	Žilina (1)	Borčice
14:00		Report	Haskić 22'; Škriniar 33'; Jánošík 82'	Stadium: Stadium TJ Iskra Borčice; Attendance: 2,011; Referee: Pavel Ochotnický

== Final stage ==
=== Bracket ===
Round of 16
Vyšné Opátske (3)	0
Žilina (1)	5
Zlaté Moravce (1)	4
Myjava (1)	2
Rohožník (3)	0
VSS Košice (2)	2
Nové Mesto nad Váhom (2)	1 (3)
Senica (1) (p)	1 (4)
Dolný Kubín (2)	1
Trenčín (1)	4
Dunajská Streda (1)	3
Prešov (2)	1
Slovan Bratislava (1)	1
Pohronie (2)	0
Topoľčany (3)	0
Ružomberok (1)	5

Quarter-finals
Zlaté Moravce	1
Ružomberok	2
Senica	1 (3)
Slovan Bratislava (p)	1 (4)
Žilina	3
Dunajská Streda	0
VSS Košice	1
Trenčín	2

Semi-finals
Slovan Bratislava	0	1	1
Žilina	0	1	1
Trenčín	5	1	6
Ružomberok	1	0	1

Final
Slovan Bratislava	1
Trenčín	3

=== Round of 16 ===
Round of 16 matches were played on 3, 4 and 11 November 2015. All times are CET (UTC+1).

3 November 2015	Zlaté Moravce (1)	4–2	Myjava (1)	Zlaté Moravce
17:00	Majkić 3'; Tawamba 22'; Jhonnes 65'; Krznarić 78'	Report	Tipurić 43' (o.g.); Sládek 70'	Stadium: ViOn Aréna; Attendance: 588; Referee: Dušan Sedlák

3 November 2015	Vyšné Opátske (3)	0–5	Žilina (1)	Vyšné Opátske
13:30		Report	Hlohovský 34'; Mabouka 36'; Králik 51'; Jánošík 85'; Paur 89'	Stadium: Futbalový štadión FK Vyšné Opátske; Attendance: 1,010; Referee: Boris Marhefka

4 November 2015	Rohožník (3)	0–2	VSS Košice (2)	Rohožník
13:30		Report	Karaš 50'; Serečin 83'	Stadium: FC Rohožník Stadium; Attendance: 811; Referee: Adam Somoláni

4 November 2015	Dolný Kubín (2)	1–4	Trenčín (1)	Dolný Kubín
13:30	Laura 14'	Report	Schet 26' van Kessel 41'; Bero 58'; Holúbek 83'	Stadium: Štadión MUDr. Ivana Chodáka; Attendance: 513; Referee: Roland Weiss

4 November 2015	Nové Mesto nad Váhom (2)	1–1 (3–4 p)	Senica (1)	Nové Mesto nad Váhom
13:30	Belic 80'	Report	Kalabiška 61'	Stadium: Mestský štadión NMnV; Attendance: 333; Referee: Pavol Šuniar

4 November 2015	Slovan Bratislava (1)	1–0	Pohronie (2)	Bratislava
17:00	Vittek 80'	Report		Stadium: Pasienky; Referee: Filip Glova

4 November 2015	Dunajská Streda (1)	3–1	Prešov (2)	Dunajská Streda
17:00	Polievka 17'; Szarka 57'; Horváth 80'	Report	Tubonemi 15'	Stadium: Mestský Stadion; Referee: Ladislav Prešinský

11 November 2015	Topoľčany (3)	0–5	Ružomberok (1)	Topoľčany
13:30		Report	Faško 23', 50'; Maslo 36'; Masaryk 38', 70'	Stadium: Futbalový štadión Vojtecha Schotterta; Attendance: 365; Referee: Martin Ježík

=== Quarter-finals ===
Quarter-finals were played on 15 and 16 March 2016. All times are CET (UTC+1).

15 March 2016	Zlaté Moravce (1)	1–2	Ružomberok (1)	Zlaté Moravce
17:00	Slančík 28'	Report	Ďubek 11' (pen.); Lačný 39'	Stadium: ViOn Aréna; Attendance: 423; Referee: Michal Smolák

15 March 2016	Senica (1)	1–1 (3–4 p)	Slovan Bratislava (1)	Senica
17:30	Hromada 15'	Report	Priskin 44'	Stadium: OMS Arena; Attendance: 963; Referee: Štefan Leško

15 March 2016	Žilina (1)	3–0	Dunajská Streda (1)	Žilina
18:00	Špalek 33'; Paur 64'; Vavro 79'	Report		Stadium: Štadión pod Dubňom; Attendance: 792; Referee: Július Straka

16 March 2016	VSS Košice (2)	1–2	Trenčín (1)	Košice
14:00	Janič 25'	Report	Koolwijk 18' (pen.); Konnsimbal 72' (o.g.)	Stadium: Lokomotíva Stadium; Attendance: 1,380; Referee: Marek Špaček

=== Semi-finals ===
Semi-finals were played on 5–6 April and 12–13 April 2016. All times are CET (UTC+1).

==== First leg ====
5 April 2016	Slovan Bratislava (1)	0–0	Žilina (1)	Bratislava
18:30		Report		Stadium: Pasienky; Attendance: 1,089; Referee: Patrik Hrčka

6 April 2016	Trenčín (1)	5–1	Ružomberok (1)	Trenčín
17:00	Kalu 3' van Kessel 24', 68', 82'; Skovajsa 66'	Report	Zošák 62' (pen.)	Stadium: Štadión na Sihoti; Attendance: 1,846; Referee: Jozef Pavlík

==== Second leg ====
12 April 2016	Žilina (1)	1–1 (1–1 agg.)	Slovan Bratislava (1)	Žilina
18:00	Hlohovský 42'	Report	Oršula 53'	Stadium: Štadión pod Dubňom; Attendance: 2,451; Referee: Dušan Sedlák

13 April 2016	Ružomberok (1)	0–1 (1–6 agg.)	Trenčín (1)	Ružomberok
17:00		Report	Guba 77'	Stadium: Štadión pod Čebraťom; Attendance: 1,119; Referee: Pavol Chmura

== Final ==
The final was played on 29 April 2016.

29 April 2016
20:30 CEST (UTC+2)

Slovan Bratislava	1–3	Trenčín
Zreľák 53'	Report	Maierhofer 78' van Kessel 86', 90'

Štadión Antona Malatinského, Trnava
Attendance: 8,547
Referee: Dušan Sedlák
