= 2014–15 Slovak Cup =

Slovnaft cup

Tournament details
- Country: Slovakia
- Teams: 214

Final positions
- Champions: AS Trenčín
- Runners-up: FK Senica

Tournament statistics
- Top goal scorer(s): 6 goals: Karol Mészáros (Slovan Bratislava)

The 2014–15 Slovak Cup, also known as Slovnaft Cup for sponsorship reasons, was the 46th edition of the competition. The winners of the competition will qualify for the second qualifying round of the 2015–16 UEFA Europa League.

== Format ==
In the 2014–15 season a new format was implemented.

== Teams ==
Round	Clubs remaining	Clubs involved	Winners from previous round	New entries this round	Leagues entering at this round	Scheduled playing date
First Round	214	182	0	182	4. Liga; 3. Liga	26–27 July 2014
Second Round	128	128	96	32	DOXXbet liga Fortuna Liga	12–13 August 2014
Third Round	64	64	64	0	none	2–3 September 2014
Fourth Round	32	32	32	0	none	14–15 October 2014
Fifth Round	16	16	16	0	none	12 November 2014
Quarter-finals	8	8	8	0	none	17 March 2015
Semi-finals	4	4	4	0	none	7–21 April 2015
Final	2	2	2	0	none	1 May 2015

== First round ==
The matches took place on 26 and 27 July 2014.

Team 1	Score	Team 2
Jednota Sokol Chocholná-Velčice (4)	2–0	TJ KOVO Beluša (4)
TJ Veľké Lovce (4)	1–10	OTJ Palárikovo (3)
OK Častkovce (4)	1–0	OŠK Trenčianske Stankovce (4)
FK Junior Kanianka (4)	0–1	FC Baník Horná Nitra (4)
TJ Družstevník Dvory nad Žitavou (4)	1–5	Šk Šurany (4)
FC Slovan Galanta (4)	0–2	TJ OFC Gabčíkovo (3)
MŠK Slovan Trenčianske Teplice (4)	w/o	FK Spartak Bánovce nad Bebravou (4)
FK Jablonové (4)	w/o	FC Ružinov Bratislava (4)
MFK Nová Dubnica (4)	1–0	TJ ISKRA Borčice (3)
FK Kolárovo (4)	3–1	KFC Komárno (3)
ŠK Eldus Močenok (4)	w/o	FC Neded (3)
TJ Partizán Domaniža (4)	3–0	FK Púchov (3)
ŠK Tvrdošovce (4)	1–4	ČFK Nitra (4)
MŠO Štúrovo (4)	0–6	FKM Nové Zámky (3)
MŠK Želiezovce (4)	2–4	TJ Družstevník Veľké Ludince (3)
TJ Slavoj Boleráz (4)	w/o	TJ Iskra Holíč (4)
FO ŠK Modranka (4)	w/o	PFK Piešťany (3)
FK Vlčany (4)	0–2	MŠK - Thermál Veľký Meder (3)
ŠK Blava Jaslovské Bohunice (4)	1–2	MFK Vrbové (3)
KFC Kalná nad Hronom (4)	3–1	FK Slovan Levice (3)
TJ Slovan Čeľadice (4)	4–1	OTJ Horné Obdokovce (4)
FK Tempo Partizánske (4)	2–3	ŠK Slovan Šimonovany (4)
ŠK Šenkvice (4)	3–3 (5–3 p)	ŠK Tomášov (3)
ŠKP Inter Dúbravka (4)	0–3	FK Rača (3)
TJ Malinovo (4)	2–4	FK Slovan Ivanka pri Dunaji (3)
FK Karpaty Limbach (4)	7–0	FK Dúbravka Bratislava (4)
TJ Záhoran Kostolište (4)	1–3	FK Tatran Stupava (3)
FC Zohor (4)	0–2	ŠK Lozorno (3)
FC Malacky (4)	1–1 (4–5 p)	ŠK Danubia Bratislava (4)
TJ Dubová (4)	2–5	ŠK Svätý Jur (3)
TJ Čunovo Bratislava (4)	0–4	FC Rohožník (3)
PŠC Pezinok (4)	1–0	MFK Rusovce (4)
TJ Slovan Viničné (3)	1–3	TJ Rovinka (3)
FK Vajnory (4)	5–0	TJ Družstevník Závod (4)
ŠK Plavecký Štvrtok/OFK Vysoká pri Morave (4)	0–3	ŠK Vrakuňa Bratislava (4)
FC Družstevník Budmerice (4)	0–7	OŠK Slovenský Grob (3)
ŠK Štart Nepočujúci (4)	0–3	FK Inter Bratislava (3)
FK Lokomotíva Devínska Nová Ves (4)	2–2 (4–1 p)	TJ Záhoran Jakubov (4)
TJ Veľké Leváre (4)	0–1	FK Slovan Most pri Bratislave (3)
SDM Domino Bratislava (4)	0–1	ŠK Báhoň (3)
SFC Kalinkovo (4)	1–2	ŠK Bernolákovo (3)
FK REaMOS Kysucký Lieskovec (4)	1–2	OŠK Baník Stráňavy (4)
FK Slovenské Ďarmoty (4)	5–0	TJ Prameň Kováčová (4)
TJ Máj Ružomberok – Černová (4)	4–2	TJ Družstevník Belá - Dulice (4)
TJ Stráža (4)	4–0	OŠK Rosina (4)
ATTACK Vrútky (4)	1–2	TJ Tatran Bytčica (4)
MFK Spartak Hriňová (4)	2–0	ŠK Vinica (4)
MFK Revúca (4)	2–3	MFK Detva (4)
TJ Jednota Málinec (4)	0–0 (5–4 p)	TJ Sklotatran Poltár (4)
FK Slovan Trstená (4)	1–3	TJ Tatran Oravské Veselé (4)
FC Slovan Divín (4)	0–3	JUPIE Podlavice Badín (4)

== Second round ==
The matches took place on 12, 13, 20 & 27 August 2014.

Team 1	Score	Team 2
FK CSM Tisovec (4)	0–5	Partizán Bardejov (2)
TJ Tatran Bytčica (4)	0–6	FK Dukla Banská Bystrica (1)
FO Kinex Bytča (3)	2–2 (3–0 p)	MFK Dolný Kubín (2)
ŠK Futura Humenné (3)	0–3	MFK Lokomotíva Zvolen (2)
ŠK Slovan Šimonovany (4)	0–3	FC ViOn Zlaté Moravce (1)
FK Karpaty Limbach (4)	1–2	MFK Skalica (2)
FK Tatran Stupava (3)	0–4	ŠK SFM Senec (2)
TJ Rovinka (3)	1–1 (5–4 p)	AFC Nové Mesto nad Váhom (2)
OFK Slovan Poproč (4)	1–0	FK Slavoj Trebišov (2)
ČFK Nitra (4)	1–6	FKM Nové Zámky (3)
FK Lamač Bratislava (4)	0–6	FK Slovan Duslo Šaľa (2)
TJ OFC Gabčíkovo (3)	1–4	FK Senica (1)
ŠK Závažná Poruba (4)	1–3	FK Čadca (3)
MFK Žarnovica (3)	2–1	MŠK Tatran (3)
FK Tatran Zámutov (4)	5–0	TJ Slavoj Kráľovský Chlmec (4)
Družstevník Veľký Horeš (4)	1–5	MFK Tatran Liptovský Mikuláš (2)
TJ FK Vyšné Opátske (3)	0–1	ŽP Šport Podbrezová (1)
TJ Družstevník Veľké Ludince (3)	3–0	FK Spartak Vráble (3)
MFK Topvar Topoľčany (3)	2–0	MŠK - Thermál Veľký Meder (3)
ŠK Strážske (4)	0–4	FK AS Trenčín (1)
FK Slovenské Ďarmoty (4)	0–2	MŠK Fomat Martin (3)
SP MFK Rožňava (4)	3–1	FTC Fiľakovo (4)
OFK - SIM Raslavice (4)	0–1	MŠK Tatran Spišské Vlachy (4)
MFK Nová Dubnica (4)	5–1	FK Kolárovo (4)
MŠK Námestovo (3)	0–4	MFK Košice (1)
ŠK Eldus Močenok (4)	0–0 (5–4 p)	ŠK LR Crystal Lednické Rovne (3)
MFK Spartak Medzev (4)	2–1	FK Spišská Nová Ves (3)
TJ Jednota Málinec (4)	2–4	TJ Tatran Oravské Veselé (4)
FK LAFC Lučenec (3)	2–0	ŠKM Liptovský Hrádok (3)
FK TJ Lokomotíva ŠM Michaľany (4)	2–10	1. FC Tatran Prešov (2)
TJ Družstevník Liptovská Štiavnica (4)	1–3	FK Rakytovce 85 (3)
FK Pokrok SEZ Krompachy (4)	2–2 (3–5 p)	FK Poprad (2)
ŠK Kremnička (3)	1–0	MFK Ružomberok (1)
KFC Kalná nad Hronom (4)	1–1 (5–3 p)	TJ Slovan Čeľadice (4)
MŠK Kysucké Nové Mesto (4)	1–5	ŠK Tvrdošín (4)
MFK Spartak Hriňová (4)	1–3	MFK Nová Baňa (3)
MFK Detva (4)	0–4	OFK Teplička nad Váhom (3)
Jednota Sokol Chocholná - Velčice (4)	0–6	FK Slovan Nemšová (3)
TJ Máj Ružomberok – Černová (4)	1–1 (3–2 p)	TJ Stráža (4)
OK Častkovce (4)	3–1	OTJ Palárikovo (3)
FK Čaňa (4)	1–3	FC Lokomotíva Košice (2)
FK - 34 Brusno - Ondrej (3)	1–2	FC Spartak Trnava (1)
TJ Slavoj Boleráz (4)	0–4	FK Pohronie (2)
MFK Vrbové (3)	0–3	FC Nitra (2)
ŠK Vrakuňa Bratislava (4)	2–9	Spartak Myjava (1)
MŠK Slovan Trenčianske Teplice (4)	3–0	FC Ružinov Bratislava (4)
ŠK Svätý Jur (3)	1–2	FC Rohožník (3)
OŠK Slovenský Grob (3)	0–1	FK Inter Bratislava (3)
ŠK Šenkvice (4)	1–3	FK Rača (3)
ŠFK Prenaks Jablonec (4)	0–3	OFK Dunajská Lužná (3)
PŠC Pezinok (4)	1–3	MFK Dubnica (2)
FK Lokomotíva Devínska Nová Ves (4)	1–3	FK Slovan Most pri Bratislave (3)
MŠK Kráľová pri Senci (3)	0–1	MŠK Žilina (1)
FK Slovan Ivanka pri Dunaji (3)	1–6	FC ŠTK 1914 Šamorín (2)
FC Baník Horná Nitra (4)	2–0	Šk Šurany (4)
ŠK Báhoň (3)	2–0	ŠK Bernolákovo (3)
FK Vajnory (4)	1–12	ŠKF Sereď (2)
TJ Partizán Domaniža (4)	0–3	FK DAC 1904 Dunajská Streda (1)
ŠK Danubia Bratislava (4)	1–4	ŠK Lozorno (3)
JUPIE Podlavice Badín (4)	2–1	Šk Javorník Makov (3)
MFK Veľke Kapušany (4)	0–3	FK Bodva Moldava nad Bodvou (2)
OŠK Baník Stráňavy (4)	1–1 (3–4 p)	MŠK Rimavská Sobota (2)
ŠK Štrba (4)	0–5	MFK Zemplín Michalovce (2)
FO ŠK Modranka (4)	1–5	ŠK Slovan Bratislava (1)

== Third round ==
The matches took place on 2, 3, 9, 10, 23, 24 September, 1 October and 12 November 2014.

2 September 2014	Skalica (2)	4–0	Senec (2)	Skalica
17:00	Majerník 8'; Šebesta 28', 54'; Konečný 85' (pen.)	Report		Stadium: Stadium Mestský Skalica; Attendance: 315; Referee: Marek Špaček

2 September 2014	Rovinka (3)	1–3	Slovan Duslo Šaľa (2)	Rovinka
17:00	Marko 25'	Report	Fehervári 6'; Urban 30'; Nurković 80'	Stadium: Stadium TJ Rovinka; Attendance: 70; Referee: Adam Somoláni

2 September 2014	Poprad (2)	2–2 (a.e.t.) (4–2 p)	Tatran Prešov (2)	Poprad
18:30	Tropp 29'; Kubus 44'	Report	Krajník 53'; Leško 78'	Stadium: NTC Poprad; Attendance: 1,700; Referee: Roland Weiss
	Penalties
	Bendík (penalty scored); Michlík (penalty missed); Kubus (penalty scored); Janigloš (penalty scored); Ujčík (penalty scored)		(penalty missed) Leško; (penalty scored) Jacko; (penalty scored) Katona; (penalty missed) Krajník

2 September 2014	Bodva Moldava nad Bodvou (2)	0–2	Partizán Bardejov (2)	Moldava nad Bodvou
19:00		Report	Stachura 22'; Berecký 66'	Stadium: Steel Slovakia aréna Attendance: 800; Referee: Igor Kozák

3 September 2014	Tatran Spišské Vlachy (4)	0–1	Lokomotíva Zvolen (2)	Spišské Vlachy
15:30		Report	Špilár 21'	Stadium: MŠK Tatran Spišské Vlachy stadium Attendance: 500; Referee: Štefan Molitoris

3 September 2014	Tvrdošín (4)	0–4	Košice (1)	Tvrdošín
16:00		Report	Haskić 24'; Pačinda 30'; Skvašík 41'; Škutka 62'	Stadium: ŠK Tvrdošín stadium Attendance: 1,000; Referee: Peter Korista

3 September 2014	Spartak Medzev (4)	0–1	Tatran Liptovský Mikuláš (2)	Medzev
16:00		Report	Szalka 75' (o.g.)	Stadium: MFK Spartak Medzev stadium Attendance: 250; Referee: Boris Marhefka

3 September 2014	Lokomotíva Košice (2)	1–2	AS Trenčín (1)	Družstevná pri Hornáde
16:00	Kokočák 5'	Report	Edmond 24'; Mondek 62'	Stadium: Stadium Družstevná pri Hornáde; Attendance: 450; Referee: Július Straka

3 September 2014	Máj Ružomberok-Černová (4)	1–4	Dukla Banská Bystrica (1)	Ružomberok
16:00	Murín 11'	Report	Vajda 27' (pen.), 28'; Mazan 56'; Faško 66'	Stadium: Stadium Máj Černová; Attendance: 945; Referee: Miroslav Fajčík

3 September 2014	Jupie Podlavice Badín (4)	6–2	Žarnovica (3)	Banská Bystrica
16:00	Prikryl 6'; Homola 30'; Plško 53'; Dubovický 60'; Výlupok 66'; Lešták 76'	Report	Eržiak 22'; Laurov 52' (pen.)	Stadium: Stadium ŠK Badín; Attendance: 200; Referee: Bystrík Nemček

3 September 2014	Slovan Trenčianske Teplice (4)	2–0	Nová Dubnica (4)	Trenčianske Teplice
16:30	Jambor 14', 90'	Report		Stadium: Stadium Marakana; Attendance: 250; Referee: Tibor Santa

3 September 2014	Močenok (4)	0–2	DAC Dunajská Streda (1)	Močenok
17:00		Report	Krišto 11'; Tóth 40'	Stadium: Stadium FK Močenok; Attendance: 1,100; Referee: Richard Sedlár

3 September 2014	Rohožník (3)	1–1 (a.e.t.) (3–1 p)	Dubnica (2)	Rohožník
17:00	Lörinczi 49'	Report	Habšuda 68'	Stadium: Stadium FC Rohožník; Attendance: 400; Referee: Slavomír Cifrík

3 September 2014	Sereď (2)	1–0	Spartak Myjava (1)	Sereď
17:00	Ciprys 51' (o.g.)	Report		Stadium: Football stadium Sereď; Attendance: 549; Referee: Martin Dohál

3 September 2014	Dunajská Lužná (3)	4–0	Lozorno (3)	Dunajská Lužná
17:00	Teraz 20'; Karovič 34' (o.g.); Pipíška 40'; Kuba 73'	Report		Stadium: Stadium OFK Dunajská Lužná; Attendance: 180; Referee: Pavol Piatka

3 September 2014	Baník Horná Nitra (4)	0–1	Senica (1)	Prievidza
18:00		Report	Pavlík 37'	Stadium: Stadium Mestský Prievidza; Attendance: 1,772; Referee: Martin Ježík

9 September 2014	Kalná nad Hronom (4)	1–4	Zlaté Moravce (1)	Kalná nad Hronom
16:00	Lackó 51'	Report	Charizopulos 22', 81'; Mikinič 77'; Orávik 86'	Stadium: Stadium KFC Kalná nad Hronom; Attendance: 600; Referee: Gabriel Michlian

10 September 2014	Slovan Poproč (4)	2–0	Tatran Zámutov (4)	Poproč
16:00	Hiľovský 50'; Bajerovský 80'	Report		Stadium: Stadium OFK Slovan Poproč; Attendance: 400; Referee: Jozef Kakaščík

10 September 2014	Kinex Bytča (3)	2–2 (a.e.t.) (2–3 p)	Kremnička (3)	Bytča
16:00	Šichman 29'; Střalka 40'	Report	Kamenský 17'; Laksík 50'	Stadium: Stadium Mestský Bytča; Attendance: 200; Referee: Michal Butora

10 September 2014	Rožňava (4)	3–1	Lučenec (3)	Rožňava
16:00	Kovács 10' (pen.); Mészner 50'; Korfanta 65'	Report	Husanik 90'	Stadium: Stadium Rožňava; Attendance: 350; Referee: Dávid Alexa

10 September 2014	Nová Baňa (3)	4–1	Rakytovce (3)	Nová Baňa
16:00	Kminiak 17'; Horniak 66', 86'; Uličný 77'	Report	Greško 58'	Stadium: Stadium MFK Nová Baňa; Attendance: 250; Referee: Roland Dodok

10 September 2014	Rača (3)	2–0	Šamorín (2)	Šamorín
17:00	Vavrik 58'; Žifčák 84'	Report		Stadium: Stadium FC ŠTK 1914 Šamorín; Attendance: 100; Referee: Michal Očenáš

23 September 2014	Báhoň (3)	0–3	Žilina (1)	Báhoň
16:00		Report	Jelić 39'; Paur 56'; Klec 86'	Stadium: Stadium ŠK Báhoň; Attendance: 546; Referee: Ladislav Prešinský

23 September 2014	Nové Zámky (3)	1–0	Družstevník Veľké Ludince (3)	Nové Zámky
16:00	Kurta 45'	Report		Stadium: Stadium Ladislava Gancznera; Attendance: 180; Referee: Tomáš Maršal

23 September 2014	Teplička nad Váhom (3)	0–3	Spartak Trnava (1)	Teplička nad Váhom
16:00		Report	Kuzma 30'; Petruš 52' (o.g.); Jendrišek 58'	Stadium: Stadium OFK Teplička nad Váhom; Attendance: 800; Referee: Michal Perašín

23 September 2014	Zemplín Michalovce (2)	1–1 (a.e.t.) (4–2 p)	Šport Podbrezová (1)	Michalovce
16:30	Vernon 63'	Report	Minčič 86'	Stadium: Stadium MFK Zemplín Michalovce; Attendance: 835; Referee: Dušan Sedlák
	Penalties
	Bayón (penalty scored); Vernon (penalty scored); Podhorín (penalty scored); Streňo (penalty scored)		(penalty scored) M. Pančík; (penalty missed) Minčič; (penalty scored) Harvilko; (penalty missed) J. Pančík

24 September 2014	Inter Bratislava (3)	1–0	Slovan Most pri Bratislave (3)	Dúbravka
16:00	Frečka 89'	Report		Stadium: Stadium FC ŠKP Dúbravka; Attendance: 150; Referee: Peter Cvengroš

24 September 2014	Častkovce (4)	1–2	Slovan Nemšová (3)	Častkovce
16:00	Madro 6' (pen.)	Report	Adamec 33'; Straňák 55'	Stadium: Futbalový štadión Častkovce; Attendance: 100; Referee: Rastislav Španka

24 September 2014	Topvar Topoľčany (3)	0–2	Nitra (2)	Topoľčany
16:00		Report	Boszorád 60'; Ivančík 81'	Stadium: Stadium Vojtecha Schotterta; Attendance: 800; Referee: Peter Krivošík

1 October 2014	Tatran Oravské Veselé (4)	2–2 (a.e.t.) (6–7 p)	Čadca (3)	Oravské Veselé
15:30	Škuta 29' (pen.); Tlelka 90' (o.g.)	Report	Moják 35'; Dobda 70'	Stadium: Stadium TJ Tatran Oravské Veselé; Attendance: 200; Referee: Martin Jaroščiak

1 October 2014	Fomat Martin (3)	2–0	Rimavská Sobota (2)	Žabokreky
15:30	Thomka 3'; Garaj 4'	Report		Stadium: Stadium FK Slovan Žabokreky; Attendance: 250; Referee: Anton Ihring

12 November 2014	Pohronie (2)	0–4	Slovan Bratislava (1)	Dolná Ždaňa
14:00		Report	Halenár 3'; Mészáros 11', 17'; Bagayoko 84'	Stadium: Stadium Dolná Ždaňa; Attendance: 1,542; Referee: Boris Marhefka

Notes

1. The match between Pohronie and Slovan Bratislava was postponed and rescheduled to a later date due to Slovan Bratislava's European campaign.

== Fourth round ==
The matches took place on 8, 14, 15, 21, 22 October and 19 November 2014.

8 October 2014	Slovan Nemšová (3)	1–4	Košice (1)	Nemšová
15:30	Straňák 58'	Report	Ostojić 25'; Škutka 32' (pen.); Haskić 63', 73'	Stadium: Štadión Nemšová; Attendance: 300; Referee: Rastislav Jurenka

14 October 2014	Nové Zámky (3)	1–3	DAC Dunajská Streda (1)	Nové Zámky
15:00	Kurta 77'	Report	Brašeň 9'; Jurčo 53'; Sabler 81'	Stadium: Stadium Ladislava Gancznera; Attendance: 920; Referee: Ladislav Prešinský

14 October 2014	Zemplín Michalovce (2)	0–3	Zlaté Moravce (1)	Michalovce
15:30		Report	Sabo 14'; Orávik 18'; Valenta 72'	Stadium: Stadium MFK Zemplín Michalovce; Attendance: 925; Referee: Patrik Hrčka

15 October 2014	Slovan Poproč (4)	1–2	Rohožník (3)	Poproč
15:00	Kováč 71'	Report	Zajíc 4'; Antálek 39'	Stadium: Stadium OFK Slovan Poproč; Attendance: 600; Referee: Peter Ziemba

15 October 2014	Lokomotíva Zvolen (2)	0–2	AS Trenčín (1)	Ružiná
15:30		Report	Guba 63'; Javorina 79' (o.g.)	Stadium: Jozef Špaur′s Stadium; Attendance: 1,200; Referee: Filip Glova

15 October 2014	Dunajská Lužná (3)	1–0	Tatran Liptovský Mikuláš (2)	Dunajská Lužná
15:30	Gallik 64'	Report		Stadium: Stadium OFK Dunajská Lužná; Attendance: 250; Referee: Peter Krivošík

15 October 2014	Čadca (3)	1–3	Slovan Duslo Šaľa (2)	Čadca
15:30	Tlelka 22'	Report	Szabo 38', 56'; Urban 68'	Stadium: Stadium FK Čadca; Attendance: 250; Referee: Michal Očenáš

15 October 2014	Kremnička (3)	0–2	Poprad (2)	Banská Bystrica
15:30		Report	Palutka 7'; Kubus 85'	Stadium: Štadión ŠK Kremnička; Attendance: 50; Referee: Anton Ihring

15 October 2014	Jupie Podlavice Badín (4)	2–1	Inter Bratislava (3)	Banská Bystrica
15:30	Plško 57'; Dubovický 58'	Report	Kubala 69'	Stadium: Stadium ŠK Badín; Attendance: 350; Referee: Miroslav Fajčík

15 October 2014	Rožňava (4)	1–1 (a.e.t.) (5–4 p)	Fomat Martin (3)	Rožňava
15:30	Kovács 66' (pen.)	Report	Gabor 24'	Stadium: Stadium Rožňava; Attendance: 550; Referee: Ľuboš Kačenga
	Penalties
	Šalamon (penalty scored); Figúr (penalty scored); Kudela (penalty scored); Drobňák (penalty scored); Kovács (penalty scored)		(penalty missed) Thomka; (penalty scored) Hanek; (penalty scored) Burger; (penalty scored) Garaj; (penalty scored) Romančík

15 October 2014	Slovan Trenčianske Teplice (4)	0–7	Spartak Trnava (1)	Trenčianske Teplice
15:30		Report	Vlasko 11'; Sabo 40', 82'; Jendrišek 60', 90+1'; Banovič 68'; Farrugia 86'	Stadium: Stadium Marakana; Attendance: 550; Referee: Tomáš Trenčanský

15 October 2014	Nová Baňa (3)	0–2	Senica (1)	Nová Baňa
15:30		Report	Kalabiška 29'; Piroska 65'	Stadium: Stadium MFK Nová Baňa; Attendance: 800; Referee: Roman Galád

15 October 2014	Nitra (2)	2–1	Sereď (2)	Nitra
17:30	Boszorád 26'; Henrich Kováč 78'	Report	Petráš 41'	Stadium: Štadión pod Zoborom; Attendance: 480; Referee: Jozef Pavlík

21 October 2014	Partizán Bardejov (2)	0–1	Dukla Banská Bystrica (1)	Bardejov
14:30		Report	Wojnar 12'	Stadium: Mestský štadión Bardejov; Attendance: 586; Referee: Ladislav Prešinský

22 October 2014	Rača (3)	0–6	Žilina (1)	Rača, Bratislava
15:00		Report	Škriniar 13', 31' (pen.); Letić 35'; Jelić 43'; Škvarka 53'; Čmelík 62'	Stadium: Štadión Rača; Attendance: 550; Referee: Martin Dohál

19 November 2014	Skalica (2)	3–5	Slovan Bratislava (1)	Skalica
13:30	Bagayoko 62' (o.g.); Jakubek 75'; Konečný 85'	Report	Kolčák 24'; Halenár 25'; Vittek 39', 51'; Kubík 79'	Stadium: Stadium Mestský Skalica; Attendance: 1,735; Referee: Martin Ježík

== Fifth round ==
The matches took place on 12, 15, 25 November 2014 and 3 March 2015.

12 November 2014	Jupie Podlavice Badín (4)	0–1	Košice (1)	Banská Bystrica
13:30		Report	Haskić 44'	Stadium: Stadium ŠK Badín; Attendance: 510; Referee: Peter Korista

12 November 2014	Rožňava (4)	0–2	DAC Dunajská Streda (1)	Rožňava
13:30		Report	Ujlaky 49'; Kwin 73'	Stadium: Stadium Rožňava; Attendance: 1,300; Referee: Miroslav Fajčík

12 November 2014	Dunajská Lužná (3)	1–2	Dukla Banská Bystrica (1)	Dunajská Lužná
13:30	Gallik 64'	Report	Dolný 9', 73' (pen.)	Stadium: Stadium OFK Dunajská Lužná; Attendance: 460; Referee: Martin Dohál

12 November 2014	Slovan Duslo Šaľa (2)	0–0 (a.e.t.) (5–3 p)	Poprad (2)	Šaľa
13:30		Report		Stadium: Šaľa Stadium; Attendance: 300; Referee: Peter Krivošík
	Penalties
	Fehervári (penalty scored); Nurković (penalty scored); Tomiš (penalty scored); Rehák (penalty scored); Matić (penalty scored)		(penalty scored) Bendík; (penalty scored) Ferenc; (penalty scored) Kubus; (penalty missed) Ondruš

12 November 2014	Zlaté Moravce (1)	1–3	AS Trenčín (1)	Zlaté Moravce
17:30	Charizopulos 39'	Report	Hajradinović 7'; Jairo 15'; Simon 84'	Stadium: Štadión FC ViOn; Attendance: 386; Referee: Marek Mastiš

15 November 2014	Rohožník (3)	1–4	Senica (1)	Rohožník
13:00	Zajíc 31'	Report	Piroska 23' (pen.); Hlohovský 29'; Kóňa 59'; Kalabiška 76'	Stadium: Stadium FC Rohožník; Attendance: 1,100; Referee: Rastislav Jurenka

25 November 2014	Žilina (1)	1–1 (a.e.t.) (3–4 p)	Spartak Trnava (1)	Žilina
17:30	Paur 44'	Report	Jendrišek 26'	Stadium: Štadión pod Dubňom; Attendance: 1,188; Referee: Jozef Pavlík
	Penalties
	Škriniar (penalty scored); Letić (penalty scored); Jelić (penalty missed); Čmelík (penalty scored); Lupčo (penalty missed)		(penalty scored) Casado; (penalty scored) Jendrišek; (penalty scored) Bortel; (penalty scored) Sabo

3 March 2015	Slovan Bratislava (1)	5–2	Nitra (2)	Bratislava
15:00	Jablonský 47'; Ďuriš 53'; Štefánik 64', 90+1'; Mészáros 72'	Report	Kemláge 12'; Paukner 83' (pen.)	Stadium: Štadión Pasienky; Attendance: 756; Referee: Patrik Hrčka

== Quarter-finals ==
The matches took place on 17 and 18 March 2015.

17 March 2015	Spartak Trnava (1)	1–2	Senica (1)	Trnava
15:00	Sabo 45' (pen.)	Report	Majtán 40'; Kosorin 74'	Stadium: Štadión Antona Malatinského; Attendance: 1,971; Referee: Miroslav Jaška

17 March 2015	Dukla Banská Bystrica (1)	4–1	Slovan Duslo Šaľa (2)	Banská Bystrica
16:30	Faško 11', 13', 70'; Balko 58'	Report	Nurković 90'	Stadium: SNP Stadium; Attendance: 568; Referee: Ján Valášek

18 March 2015	Košice (1)	1–1 (a.e.t.) (2–3 p)	DAC Dunajská Streda (1)	Košice
14:30	Viazanko 64'	Report	Ljubičić 88'	Stadium: Lokomotíva Stadium; Attendance: 1,410; Referee: Jozef Pavlík
	Penalties
	Viazanko (penalty scored); Sekulić (penalty missed); Pačinda (penalty scored); Novák (penalty missed); Šinglár (penalty missed)		(penalty scored) Szarka; (penalty scored) Szabó; (penalty scored) Michalík; (penalty missed) Sarr

18 March 2015	AS Trenčín (1)	2–1	Slovan Bratislava (1)	Trenčín
17:30	Jairo 75' van Kessel 81'	Report	Mészáros 12'	Stadium: Štadión na Sihoti; Attendance: 2,831; Referee: Dušan Sedlák

== Semi-finals ==
The first legs were played on 7 and 8 April 2015 and the second legs were played on 21 April 2015.

=== First legs ===
7 April 2015	DAC Dunajská Streda (1)	1–0	Senica (1)	Dunajská Streda
18:00	Štepanovský 12'	Report		Stadium: DAC Stadion; Attendance: 2,153; Referee: Mário Vlk

8 April 2015	AS Trenčín (1)	2–0	Dukla Banská Bystrica (1)	Trenčín
17:30	Koolwijk 9'; Ramón 85'	Report		Stadium: Štadión na Sihoti; Attendance: 1,798; Referee: Gabriel Michlian

=== Second legs ===
21 April 2015	Senica (1)	1–0 (a.e.t.) (1–1 agg.) (6–5 p)	DAC Dunajská Streda (1)	Senica
17:30	Kóňa 65'	Report		Stadium: OMS Arena; Attendance: 1,685; Referee: Ľubomír Samotný
	Penalties
	Majtán (penalty scored); Dolný (penalty scored); Kalabiška (penalty scored); Opiela (penalty scored); Hlohovský (penalty missed); Hušek (penalty missed); Pillár (penalty scored); Kóňa (penalty scored)		Szabó (penalty scored); Brašeň (penalty scored); Horváth (penalty scored); Michalík (penalty missed); Szarka (penalty scored); Ljubičić (penalty missed); Sesar (penalty scored); Turňa (penalty missed)

21 April 2015	Dukla Banská Bystrica (1)	0–1 (0–3 agg.)	AS Trenčín (1)	Banská Bystrica
17:30		Report	Jairo 30'	Stadium: SNP Stadium; Attendance: 186; Referee: Dušan Sedlák

== Final ==
The final was played on 1 May 2015.

1 May 2015
18:15 CEST

AS Trenčín	2–2 (a.e.t.)	Senica
Ibrahim 36' van Kessel 110'	Report	Čögley 4' (o.g.); Kalabiška 115'
Penalties
van Kessel (penalty missed); Lobotka (penalty scored); Mondek (penalty scored); Rundić (penalty scored)	3–2	(penalty missed) Majtán; (penalty scored) Hlohovský; (penalty scored) Opiela; (penalty missed) Kóňa; (penalty missed) Kalabiška

NTC Poprad, Poprad
Attendance: 3,473
Referee: Richard Trutz
