= Mirošov =

Mirošov may refer to places:

== Czech Republic ==
- Mirošov (Jihlava District), a municipality and village in the Vysočina Region
- Mirošov (Rokycany District), a municipality and village in the Plzeň Region
- Mirošov (Žďár nad Sázavou District), a municipality and village in the Vysočina Region
- Mirošov, a village and part of Valašské Klobouky in the Zlín Region

== Slovakia ==
- Nižný Mirošov
- Vyšný Mirošov
