= Vinica Municipality =

Vinica Municipality may refer to:

- Vinica Municipality, North Macedonia
- Vinica, Varaždin County, Croatia
- Vinica, Veľký Krtíš District, Slovakia
