= Miroslav Nemec =

Miroslav Nemec may refer to:

- Miroslav Nemec (footballer), Slovak footballer and manager
- Miroslav Nemec (actor), German actor
