= Rohožník =

Rohožník may refer to:

- Rohožník, Humenné District, Slovakia
- Rohožník, Malacky District, Slovakia
