= Dávid Meliš =

Slovak footballer

Personal information
- Full name: Dávid Meliš
- Date of birth: 18 September 2001 (age 25)
- Place of birth: Slovakia
- Height: 1.85 m (6 ft 1 in)
- Position: Forward

Team information
- Current team: Rohožník

Youth career
- 2008−2015: TJ Sokol Borský Mikuláš
- 2015−2019: Senica

Senior career*
| Years | Team | Apps | (Gls) |
| 2019−2020 | Senica | 9 | (0) |
| 2020− | Rohožník | 7 | (1) |
- * Club domestic league appearances and goals as of 1 July 2021

Dávid Meliš (born 18 September 2001) is a Slovak footballer who plays for Rohožník in 2. Liga as a forward.

== Club career ==
=== FK Senica ===
Meliš made his Fortuna Liga debut for Senica against Železiarne Podbrezová on 24 May 2019.
