= Giorgi Gamkrelidze =

Georgian-Ukrainian footballer

Georgi Gamkrelidze
Personal information
- Full name: Georgi Tengizovych Gamkrelidze
- Date of birth: 30 September 1987 (age 39)
- Place of birth: Tbilisi, Georgian SSR
- Height: 1.75 m (5 ft 9 in)
- Position: Midfielder

Team information
- Current team: SU Vortuna Bad Leonfeld

Youth career
- 2003–2004: Karpaty Lviv

Senior career*
Years	Team	Apps	(Gls)
2005	Halychyna Drohobych	4	(0)
2006	Stal Dniprodzerzhynsk	27	(9)
2008–2015	Zemplín Michalovce	255	(57)
2011	→Rimavská Sobota (loan)	8	(0)
2015	→Thermál Veľký Meder (loan)	12	(2)
2015	Thermál Veľký Meder	13	(0)
2016	Guria Lanchkhuti	15	(2)
2016	Samtredia	12	(1)
2017–2018	Thermál Veľký Meder	43	(6)
2018–2019	TJ Imeľ	24	(12)
2019–	SU Vortuna Bad Leonfeld		
- * Club domestic league appearances and goals as of 6 February 2017

Georgi Gamkrelidze (Georgian: გიორგი გამყრელიძე; Ukrainian: Георгій Тенгізович Гамкрелідзе; born 30 September 1987) is a Georgian-Ukrainian football midfielder who played for the Samtredia.
