= Racko =

Racko may refer to:

- Rack-O, a card game
- Filip Racko (born 1985), Czech footballer
- Arpád Račko (1930–2015), Slovak sculptor
