= Mitchell Schet =

Dutch footballer (born 1988)

Personal information
- Full name: Mitchell Stuart Schet
- Date of birth: 28 January 1988 (age 38)
- Place of birth: Amsterdam, Netherlands
- Height: 1.86 m (6 ft 1 in)
- Position: Winger

Youth career
- CTO '70
- Abcoude
- Utrecht
- 2005–2008: Feyenoord

Senior career*
Years	Team	Apps	(Gls)
2008–2010	Feyenoord	4	(0)
2009–2010	→ Excelsior (loan)	19	(4)
2010–2012	RKC Waalwijk	27	(2)
2012–2013	Groningen	22	(1)
2013–2015	ADO Den Haag	35	(2)
2015–2016	AS Trenčín	18	(6)
2016–2018	Slovan Bratislava	27	(5)
2019	Xylotymbou		
2020–2022	Katwijk	6	(0)

International career
2005	Netherlands U17	2	(0)
2008	Netherlands U21	1	(0)
- * Club domestic league appearances and goals as of 10 January 2023

Mitchell Schet (born 28 January 1988) is a Dutch footballer who plays as a right winger.

== Club career ==
Schet signed with Feyenoord in 2005, from the youth academy of Utrecht. He played at the FIFA U-17 World Cup in Peru, where the Netherlands reached the semi-finals. Schet made his first-team debut on 23 August 2008 in the Dutch Super Cup against PSV Eindhoven. He made his league-debut on 13 September 2008 against Volendam.

For the 2009–10 season, Schet was loaned out to Excelsior, but returned to Feyenoord during the winter transfer period.

Schet signed a contract with RKC Waalwijk on 7 May 2010, keeping him in Waalwijk until 2012. He signed with Groningen in May 2012, but already left the team a year later as he was released by the team. He signed with ADO Den Haag in July 2013. In 2015, he signed with Slovak Fortuna Liga club AS Trenčín and won double in 2015-16. After the championship triumph celebrations, he caused a serious car accident. Driving while drunk, he injured himself and two other people, wrecking their car. He was subsequently released by the club.

At the end of July 2019, Schet joined Cypriot club PO Xylotymbou. His contract was terminated in January 2020, effectively making him a free agent. In September 2020, he joined Dutch Tweede Divisie club VV Katwijk.

== International career ==
Born in the Netherlands, Schet is of Surinamese descent. He is a youth international for the Netherlands.

== Statistics ==
Club performance			League		Cup		Continental		Total	
Season	Club	League	Apps	Goals	Apps	Goals	Apps	Goals	Apps	Goals
Netherlands			League		KNVB Cup		Europe		Total	
2008-09	Feyenoord	Eredivisie	2	0	1	0	0	0	3	0
2009-10	Excelsior	Eerste Divisie	19	4	0	0	-		19	4
2009-10	Feyenoord	Eredivisie	2	0	0	0	-		2	0
2010-11	RKC Waalwijk	Eerste Divisie	9	1	1	0	-		10	1
2011-12	RKC Waalwijk	Eredivisie	18	1	2	1	-		20	2
2012-13	FC Groningen	Eredivisie	22	1	3	1	-		25	2
2013-14	ADO Den Haag	Eredivisie	23	2	0	0	-		23	2
2014-15	ADO Den Haag	Eredivisie	12	0	1	0	-		13	0
Total	Netherlands		107	9	8	2	0	0	115	11
Career total			107	9	8	2	0	0	115	11

Statistics accurate as of last match played on 26 May 2015.

== Honours ==
=== Club ===
RKC Waalwijk

- Eerste Divisie (1): 2010–11

AS Trenčín

- Fortuna Liga (1): 2015-16
- Slovak Cup (1): 2015-16
