= Radoslav Kunzo =

Slovak footballer (1974–2023)

Personal information
- Date of birth: 2 September 1974
- Place of birth: Levoča, Czechoslovakia
- Date of death: 12 April 2023 (aged 48)
- Height: 1.87 m (6 ft 2 in)
- Position: Defender

Senior career*
Years	Team	Apps	(Gls)
1998–2001	MFK Košice		
2001–2006	Inter Bratislava	139	(10)
2006–2007	Kapfenberger SV	12	(2)
2006–2007	Inter Bratislava	20	(6)
2007–2008	Kapfenberger SV	0	(0)
2008–2010	ŠK SFM Senec		
2010–2011	PŠC Pezinok		
2012–2015	LP Domino		
2015	FK Vajnory		
2015–2019	Devínska Nová Ves		
2019–2023	OŠK Slovenský Grob		
- * Club domestic league appearances and goals

Radoslav Kunzo (2 September 1974 – April 2023) was a Slovak footballer who played as a defender. He started playing for MFK Košice, but spent most of his career at Inter Bratislava, which he captained for several years.

Kunzo's body was recovered on 12 April 2023 after having been missing for three days following a car accident. He was 48.

His father František Kunzo was a part of the Czechoslovak football team, which won gold at the 1980 Summer Olympics.
