= Ján Hrbek =

Slovak footballer

Personal information
- Full name: Ján Hrbek
- Date of birth: 17 September 1981 (age 45)
- Place of birth: Stráňavy, Czechoslovakia
- Height: 1.71 m (5 ft 7 in)
- Position: Striker

Youth career
- OŠK Baník Stráňavy

Senior career*
Years	Team	Apps	(Gls)
–2004	OŠK Baník Stráňavy		
2001	→ FK Strečno (loan)		
2003–2004	← Žilina (loan)		
2004	→ FK Kysucký Lieskovec (loan)		
2004	Sokol Ořechov		
2005–2007	Banská Bystrica	7	(0)
2006	→ Čadca (loan)		
2007	→AQUA Turčianske Teplice (loan)		
2007–2008	Comunale Gonars		
2009–2011	OFK Kotrčiná Lúčka		
2011–	Žilina		
2013–2015	→ Žilina B	1	(0)
2015–2018	OŠK Baník Stráňavy		
- * Club domestic league appearances and goals

Ján Hrbek (born 17 September 1981) is a Slovak former football striker who is best known for playing with MŠK Žilina B.

== Club career ==
=== Early career ===
Hrbek was born in Stráňavy. In 2005, he played with FK Dukla Banská Bystrica in the highest division in Slovakia. In 2007, he moved to Italy to play for Comunale Gonars, and he later also played in Thailand.

=== Žilina ===
In 2013, Hrbek joined the reserve team of Žilina, MŠK Žilina B. After the autumn part of the season, he would be the top goal scorer for the team with 9 goals. Following his performances, 32-year-old Hrbek made his professional debut for the first team of MŠK Žilina against FK Dukla Banská Bystrica on 26 October 2013, entering as a substitute in place of Jakub Paur, in a 2–1 loss. That would be his only appearance for MŠK Žilina in the first league.

=== Later career ===
After his time at Žilina, Hrbek returned to the 4th league club, OŠK Baník Stráňavy. He helped the club achieve second place in 2015.
