= Marek Pittner =

Slovak footballer (born 1997)

Personal information
- Full name: Marek Pittner
- Date of birth: 14 February 1997 (age 29)
- Place of birth: Žiar nad Hronom, Slovakia
- Position: Defender

Team information
- Current team: FK Pohronie
- Number: 97

Youth career
- 2006–2010: TJ Tatran Bzenica
- 2011–2012: Pohronie
- 2012–2015: Senica

Senior career*
Years	Team	Apps	(Gls)
2015–2018	Senica	10	(0)
2016–2018	→ Pohronie (loan)	56	(0)
2018–2019	Šamorín	14	(2)
2019–2021	Komárno	26	(1)
2021–2022	Rohožník	30	(5)
2022	Petržalka	12	(1)
2023	Pohronie	8	(0)
2023–	Rohožník	14	(4)
- * Club domestic league appearances and goals as of 20:47, 6 February 2024 (UTC)

Marek Pittner (born 14 February 1997) is a Slovak footballer who plays as a defender for Rohožník.

Pittner began his senior career with FK Senica in the top-tier Fortuna Liga, where he made 10 appearances during the 2014–15 season. Over the following years, he played in the Slovak second division, joining clubs such as Pohronie, STK Šamorín and KFC Komárno.

== Club career ==
=== FK Senica ===
==== Youth and first-team breakout ====
He began his football career at Tatran Bzenica, from where he moved to FK Pohronie and then to Senica during his youth career. On February 25, 2015, he won the poll for the best athlete of the city in the autumn of 2014 in the U19 collective category. He played as a winger in the academy before transitioning into a defender.

During the spring part of the 2014/15 season, Pittmer worked his way into the first team. He debuted in a Slovak Cup match against FC Spartak Trnava, coming on as a substitute for an injured Petr Pavlík. Pittner made his debut in the Slovak top flight under coach Jozef Kostelník in the league match of the 23rd round on 20 March 2015 in the derby against TJ Spartak Myjava, when he replaced Jozef Dolný in the 75th minute. He featured in the final of the 2015 Slovak cup, replacing Luboš Hušek in the 113th minute. In May 2015, Pittner was sidelined for the rest of the season due to an injury to his hamstring. In the summer of 2015, he signed a new contract with the team until the end of the 2017/18 season.

==== Loan to Pohronie ====
In 2016, Pittner was loaned out to FK Pohronie. In his first season, he only played 10 games because of a recurring knee injury.
