= Martin Privrel =

Slovak footballer (born 1996)

Personal information
- Full name: Martin Privrel
- Date of birth: 11 April 1996 (age 30)
- Place of birth: Slovakia
- Position: Defender

Team information
- Current team: FC Petržalka
- Number: 8

Youth career
- –2014: Skalica
- 2011–2014: → Senica (loan)

Senior career*
Years	Team	Apps	(Gls)
2015	Senica	6	(0)
2015	→ TJ Iskra Holíč (loan)		
2016	Hodonín		
2016–2017	TJ Iskra Holíč		
2017–2018	Rohožník		
2018	→ FC Petržalka (loan)	13	(0)
2019–2020	SV St. Margarethen		
2020–2021	SC Apetlon		
2021–2022	Rohožník	22	(5)
2022–	Petržalka	37	(5)
- * Club domestic league appearances and goals as of 19:50, 15 October 2023 (UTC)

Martin Privrel (born 11 April 1996) is a Slovak footballer who currently plays for 2. liga club FC Petržalka as a defender.

== Club career ==
=== FK Senica ===
Privrel started his football career in Skalica, from where he went to Senica during his youth. On February 21, 2014, he won the poll for the city's best athlete of 2013 in the U-17 collective category.

In the 2014/15 winter transfer window, he worked his way into the first team, featuring in the club’s winter preparations in Turkey. On February 25, 2015, he won the autumn 2014 poll for the city's best athlete of 2014 in the U-19 collective category. He made his debut in the Slovak top flight in a league match on March 6, 2015 against MFK Košice, playing the entire match. He went on to make 6 appearances in the rest of the season.

=== Later career ===
In 2018, Privrel joined FC Petržalka, helping the club get promoted to the 2. Liga. He then played for Austrian clubs SV St. Margarethen and SC Apetlon, before joining FC Rohožník. In the summer of 2022, Privrel returned to Petržalka.
