= Jakub Tomanica =

Slovak footballer

Personal information
- Full name: Jakub Tomanica
- Date of birth: 17 January 1990 (age 36)
- Place of birth: Czechoslovakia (now Slovakia)
- Height: 1.80 m (5 ft 11 in)
- Position: Attacking midfielder

Team information
- Current team: OFK Teplička nad Váhom
- Number: 9

Youth career
- MŠK Žilina

Senior career*
Years	Team	Apps	(Gls)
2010–2011	MŠK Žilina B	23	(0)
2011–2012	FC Baník Ostrava	3	(0)
2012–2013	Salthill Devon	20	(2)
2013–	Námestovo		
2014	→ Teplička nad Váhom (loan)		
2015–2016	Teplička nad Váhom		
2016–2020	FC Naters		
- * Club domestic league appearances and goals

Jakub Tomanica (born 17 January 1990) is a Slovak former football midfielder who played for clubs in Slovakia, the Czech Republic, Ireland and Switzerland.

He previously played for Gambrinus Liga club FC Baník Ostrava. Tomanica signed for second-tier Irish side Salthill Devon in the summer of 2012. He was involved in Salthill's first goal on 11 August 2012: after a breakaway he passed to Brian Gaffney, whose goal put the club on their way to a 2–1 win against Mervue United, just their second win of the season. He scored against Waterford United in April 2013, although his side lost 2–1 after conceding a late winner.
