= Žabokreky =

Municipality of Slovakia

- Municipality
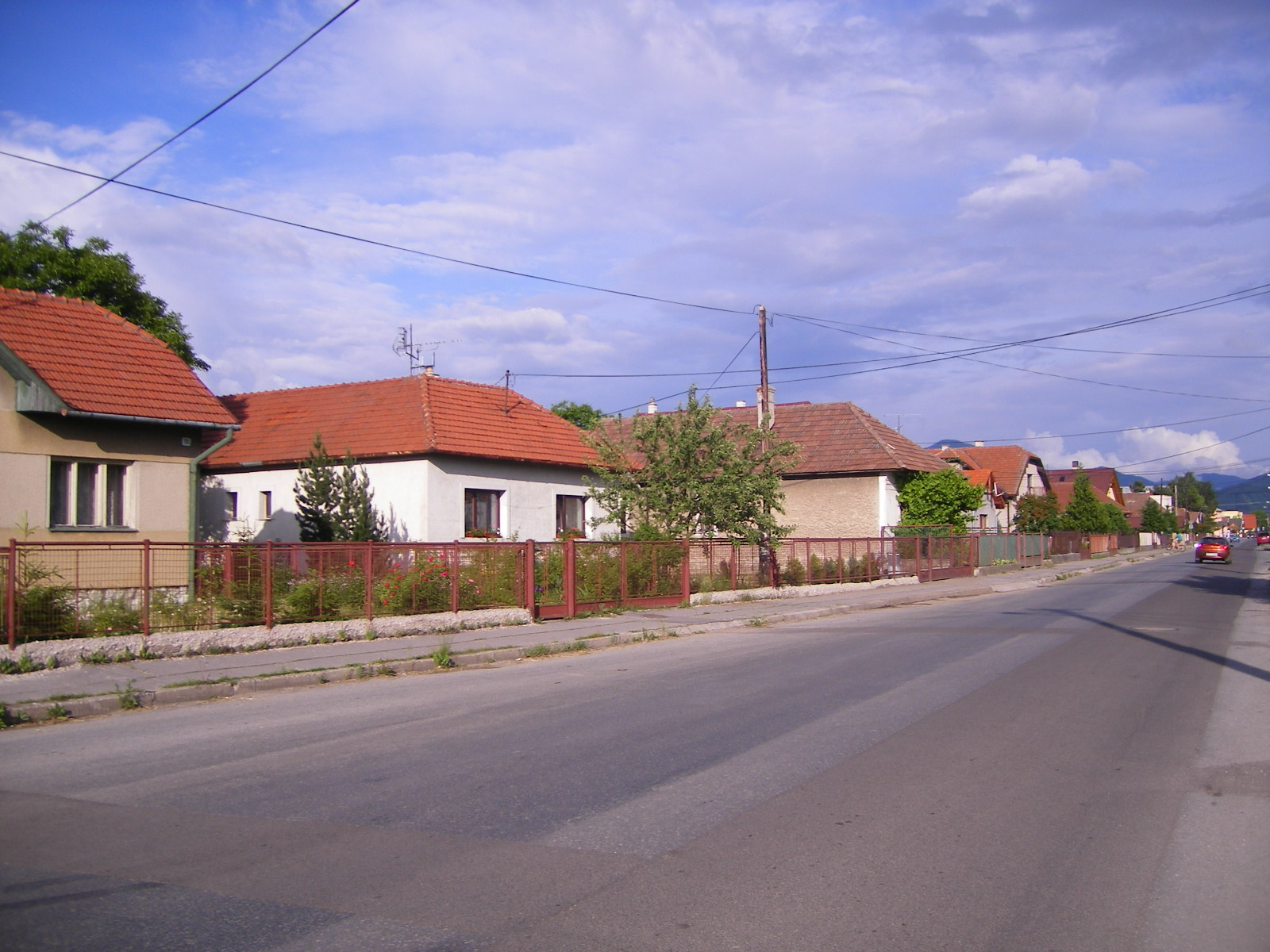

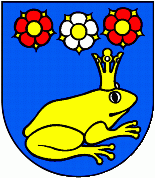
- Flag Coat of arms

- Location of Žabokreky in the Žilina Region Location of Žabokreky in Slovakia
- Coordinates: 49.03°N 18.93°E
- Country: Slovakia
- Region: Žilina Region
- District: Martin District
- First mentioned: 1282

Area
  - Total: 5.23 km^{2} (2.02 sq mi)
- Elevation: 428 m (1,404 ft)

Population (2025)
  - Total: 1,178
- Time zone: UTC+1 (CET)
  - Summer (DST): UTC+2 (CEST)
- Postal code: 384 1
- Area code: +421 43
- Vehicle registration plate (until 2022): MT
- Website: zabokreky.sk

Žabokreky (Hungarian: Zsámbokrét) is a village and municipality in Martin District in the Žilina Region of northern Slovakia.

== History ==
In historical records the village was first mentioned in 1282. Before the establishment of independent Czechoslovakia in 1918, it was part of Turóc County within the Kingdom of Hungary. From 1939 to 1945, it was part of the Slovak Republic.

== Geography ==
The municipality lies at an altitude of 428 metres (1,404 ft) and covers an area of 5.23 km^{2} (2.02 sq mi) (2025).

== Population ==
Population statistic (10 years)
Year	1995	2005	2015	2025
Count	1098	1113	1213	1178
Difference		+1.36%	+8.98%	−2.88%

Population statistic
Year	2024	2025
Count	1208	1178
Difference		−2.48%

It has a population of 1178 people (31 December 2025).

=== Ethnicity ===
Census 2021 (1+ %)
Ethnicity	Number	Fraction
Slovak	1140	94.52%
Not found out	62	5.14%
Total	1206	

In year 2021 was 1206 people by ethnicity 1140 as Slovak, 62 as Not found out, 9 as Czech, 2 as Hungarian, 1 as Romani, 1 as Polish and 1 as Other.

Note on population: The difference values of population numbers in the table "Population statistic" and in the sections "Ethnicity" & "Religion" is caused by the use of various statistical methods.

=== Religion ===
Census 2021 (1+ %)
Religion	Number	Fraction
Evangelical Church	499	41.38%
None	388	32.17%
Roman Catholic Church	238	19.73%
Not found out	59	4.89%
Total	1206	

In year 2021 was 1206 people by religion 499 from Evangelical Church, 388 from None, 238 from Roman Catholic Church, 59 from Not found out, 6 from Greek Catholic Church, 5 from Ad hoc movements, 4 from Other, 1 from Calvinist Church, 1 from Paganism and natural spirituality, 1 from Other and not ascertained christian church, 1 from Jehovah's Witnesses, 1 from Islam, 1 from United Methodist Church and 1 from Buddhism.
