= Nižný Mirošov =

- Municipality
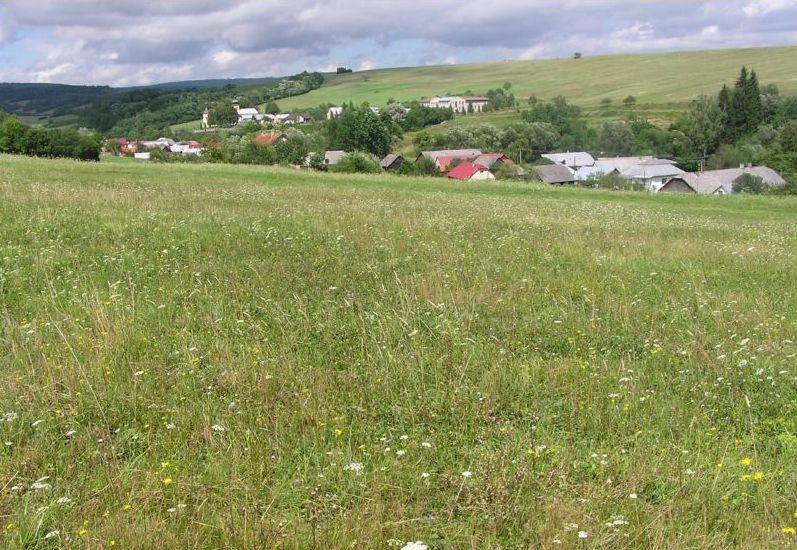

- Flag

- Location of Nižný Mirošov in the Prešov Region Location of Nižný Mirošov in Slovakia
- Coordinates: 49.38°N 21.43°E
- Country: Slovakia
- Region: Prešov Region
- District: Svidník District
- First mentioned: 1567

Area
  - Total: 6.99 km^{2} (2.70 sq mi)
- Elevation: 302 m (991 ft)

Population (2025)
  - Total: 263
- Time zone: UTC+1 (CET)
  - Summer (DST): UTC+2 (CEST)
- Postal code: 901 1
- Area code: +421 54
- Vehicle registration plate (until 2022): SK
- Website: niznymirosov.sk

Nižný Mirošov (Rusyn: Нижнїй Мирошів; Hungarian: Alsómerse) is a village and municipality in Svidník District in the Prešov Region of north-eastern Slovakia.

== History ==
In historical records the village was first mentioned in 1567.

== Geography ==
The municipality lies at an altitude of 302 metres (991 ft) and covers an area of 6.99 km^{2} (2.70 sq mi) (2025).

== Population ==
Population statistic (10 years)
Year	1995	2005	2015	2025
Count	212	269	254	263
Difference		+26.88%	−5.57%	+3.54%

Population statistic
Year	2024	2025
Count	265	263
Difference		−0.75%

It has a population of 263 people (31 December 2025).

=== Ethnicity ===
Census 2021 (1+ %)
Ethnicity	Number	Fraction
Slovak	222	82.22%
Rusyn	83	30.74%
Romani	47	17.4%
Not found out	17	6.29%
Ukrainian	8	2.96%
Total	270	

In year 2021 was 270 people by ethnicity 222 as Slovak, 83 as Rusyn, 47 as Romani, 17 as Not found out, 8 as Ukrainian and 2 as Czech.

Note on population: The difference values of population numbers in the table "Population statistic" and in the sections "Ethnicity" & "Religion" is caused by the use of various statistical methods.

=== Religion ===
Census 2021 (1+ %)
Religion	Number	Fraction
Eastern Orthodox Church	82	30.37%
Greek Catholic Church	81	30%
None	61	22.59%
Roman Catholic Church	24	8.89%
Jehovah's Witnesses	8	2.96%
Not found out	5	1.85%
Other and not ascertained christian church	4	1.48%
Evangelical Church	3	1.11%
Total	270	

In year 2021 was 270 people by religion 82 from Eastern Orthodox Church, 81 from Greek Catholic Church, 61 from None, 24 from Roman Catholic Church, 8 from Jehovah's Witnesses, 5 from Not found out, 4 from Other and not ascertained christian church, 3 from Evangelical Church, 1 from Other and 1 from Ad hoc movements.
