= OFK Teplička nad Váhom =

Slovak football club

- Full name: OFK Teplička nad Váhom
- Founded: 1928
- Ground: Stadium OFK Teplička nad Váhom, Teplička nad Váhom, Slovakia
- Capacity: 1,000 (160 seats)
- Head coach: Miroslav Nemec
- League: 3. liga
- 2015–16: 2. liga Play-out round, 3rd (relegated)
- Website: http://www.1fcteplickanadvahom.pegaz.sk/

OFK Teplička nad Váhom is a Slovak association football club located in Teplička nad Váhom. It currently plays in 5. Liga (5th tier in Slovak football system). The club was founded in 1928.

== History ==
Teplička nad Váhom took part in the Eastern Group of the Slovak second tier in the 2015–16 season. They avoided being relegated on merit, but due to financial reasons they were relegated to the 3. Liga.

On 17 July 2018, the club celebrated it 90th year as a football club.

=== Historic names ===
- 1928 - 1941 ŠK Teplička nad Váhom
- 1942 - 1945 počas vojny sa futbal nehrával
- 1945 - 1954 TJ Sokol Teplička nad Váhom
- 1954 - 1997 Družstevník Teplička nad Váhom
- 1997 - 2004 TJ OFK Teplička nad Váhom
- 2004 - 1.7.2008 Družstevník Teplička nad Váhom
- 1.7.2008 - OFK Teplička nad Váhom

== Notable players ==
Past and present

- (Slovakia) Jakub Tomanica
- (Slovakia) Martin Matúš
