= Josip Krznarić =

Croatian footballer

Personal information
- Full name: Josip Krznarić
- Date of birth: 7 January 1993 (age 33)
- Place of birth: Karlovac, Croatia
- Height: 1.76 m (5 ft 9 in)
- Position: Central midfielder

Team information
- Current team: Grindavík
- Number: 8

Senior career*
Years	Team	Apps	(Gls)
–2011	NK Ilovac		
2009	Karlovac	14	(0)
2011–2014	Lučko	67	(2)
2015	Bistra	13	(1)
2015–2016	ViOn Zlaté Moravce	32	(1)
2017–2018	Levadia Tallinn	34	(5)
2018	Istra 1961	0	(0)
2018–2019	Lafnitz	27	(2)
2019	Grazer AK	5	(0)
2020-2021	Krško	10	(2)
2021	Krka	14	(4)
2022	Triglav	11	(0)
2022-2024	Krka	44	(11)
2024-	Grindavík	21	(4)
- * Club domestic league appearances and goals as of 2 November 2024

Josip Krznarić (born 7 January 1993) is a Croatian professional footballer who most recently played for Icelandic side Grindavík as a midfielder.

== Club career ==
=== FC ViOn Zlaté Moravce ===
He made his professional debut for ViOn Zlaté Moravce against Slovan Bratislava on 19 July 2015.

== Honours ==
Individual

- Meistriliiga Player of the Month: September 2017
