= TJ Iskra Holíč =

Slovak football club

- Founded: 1920; 106 years ago, as SK Holič
- Ground: areáli TJ Iskra Holíč
- League: 6. Liga
- Website: iskraholic.sk

TJ Iskra Holíč is a Slovak football club based in Holíč, Slovakia. The club currently competes in the 6th tier of Slovak football.

== History ==
The first Workers' Gymnastics Union (RTJ) in Slovakia was established in Holíč. The exact year of its founding is debated as either 1909, 1910, or 1914. In 1920, a new football club under the name ŠK Holíč was established by a group of students and workers who traveled for work to Gbely and Hodonín. The club's first match was played in 1920 between SK Rudá hviezda Rybáre Hodonín and ŠK Holíč, with Hodonín winning 7–1.

In 1930, another club, SK Orol Holič, later ŠK Slávia Holíč, was founded. In the 1935–36 season, ŠK Holíč finished first in the third class of the Western Slovak region, with ŠK Slávia close behind. Both clubs merged in 1935 into ŠK Slávia Holič. By 1937, they played in the first class. During the Slovak State period, the club was renamed SKHG. The activities of all gymnastic associations were dissolved by a Slovak government decree on December 5, 1938. After World War II, ŠK Holíč was reestablished and developed alongside linen and hemp factories, called TJ Lankonop Holíč, until 1952 when it was renamed Iskra Holíč.

The golden age of youth football came in the late 1960s, when a new all-sports stadium for 15,000 spectators was put into use. Iskra would also win the I. A class of the Bratislava region in the 1959–1960 season and promotion to the Second Czechoslovak League.

== Rivalries ==
Iskra Holíč share a rivalry with former first division side FK Senica, with derby matches between the two being called the city derby.

== Ground ==
Iskra Holíč plays their games in the areáli TJ Iskra Holíč. In 2021, the stadium was renovated, costing the city 185,994 euros.

== Notable players ==
Notable players to have played at least one top-level match.

- Roman Konečný
- Pavol Masaryk
- Martin Privrel
- Erik Daniel
