= Ivan Minčič =

Slovak footballer

Personal information
- Full name: Ivan Minčič
- Date of birth: 14 March 1989 (age 37)
- Place of birth: Snina, Czechoslovakia
- Height: 1.98 m (6 ft 6 in)
- Position: Centre-back

Team information
- Current team: Horné Saliby (player); Petržalka (assistant coach)
- Number: 64

Youth career
- –2006: Snina
- 2007–2014: Podbrezová

Senior career*
Years	Team	Apps	(Gls)
2014–2016	Podbrezová	59	(5)
2009	→ Banská Bystrica (loan)		
2018	Petržalka		
2020–2023	Gabčíkovo		
2023–	Horné Saliby		

International career
2008	Slovakia U-19	2	(0)

Managerial career
- 2018–2020: Slovan Bratislava U-19 (assistant)
- 2021: Slovan Bratislava U-21 (assistant)
- 2021–: Petržalka (assistant)
- * Club domestic league appearances and goals

Ivan Minčič (born 14 March 1989) is a Slovak football defender who currently plays for TJ Horné Saliby. He is also the assistant coach of FC Petržalka.

== Club career ==
He made his professional debut for ŽP Šport Podbrezová against ŠK Slovan Bratislava on 11 July 2014.

In the first half of the 2018 season, Minčič played for FC Petržalka. In the summer 2018, he then began playing for the B-team of ŠTK Šamorín. At the same time, Minčič was also hired as an assistant coach at Slovan Bratislava for the club's U-19 team and later also on the club's U-21 team.

Between 2020 and 2023 Minčič played for Gabčíkovo, during his coaching career. Because in 2021 he was also hired as an assistant coach for his former club, Petržalka, under head coach Mário Auxt. In the 2023/24 season Minčič started playing for TJ Horné Saliby, while still being an assistant coach at Petržalka.
