= Csaba Szórád =

Slovak footballer

Personal information
- Full name: Csaba Szórád
- Date of birth: 9 May 1980 (age 46)
- Place of birth: Komárno, Czechoslovakia
- Height: 1.84 m (6 ft 1/2 in)
- Position: Centre back

Team information
- Current team: KFC Komárno
- Number: 23

Senior career*
Years	Team	Apps	(Gls)
- Komárno
- Strojár Nitra
?–2008	Nitra	58	(3)
2008–2009	Žilina		
2008–2009	→Trenčín (loan)		
2012–	Komárno		
- * Club domestic league appearances and goals as of 11 March 2012

Csaba Szórád (born 9 May 1980, in Komárno) is a Slovak football player, currently plays for KFC Komárno.
