= Kalinkovo =

Kalinkovo Szemet
- Municipality
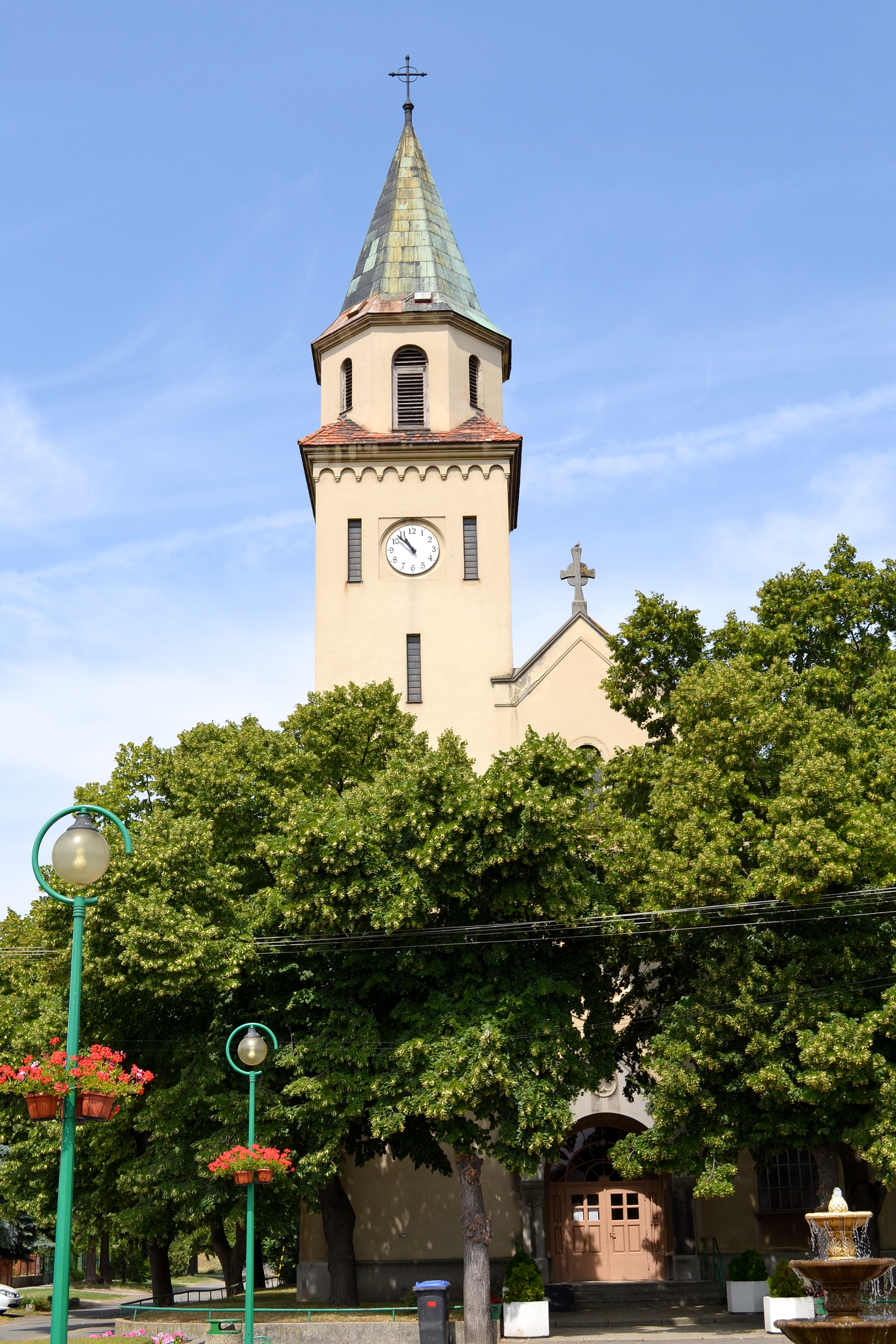

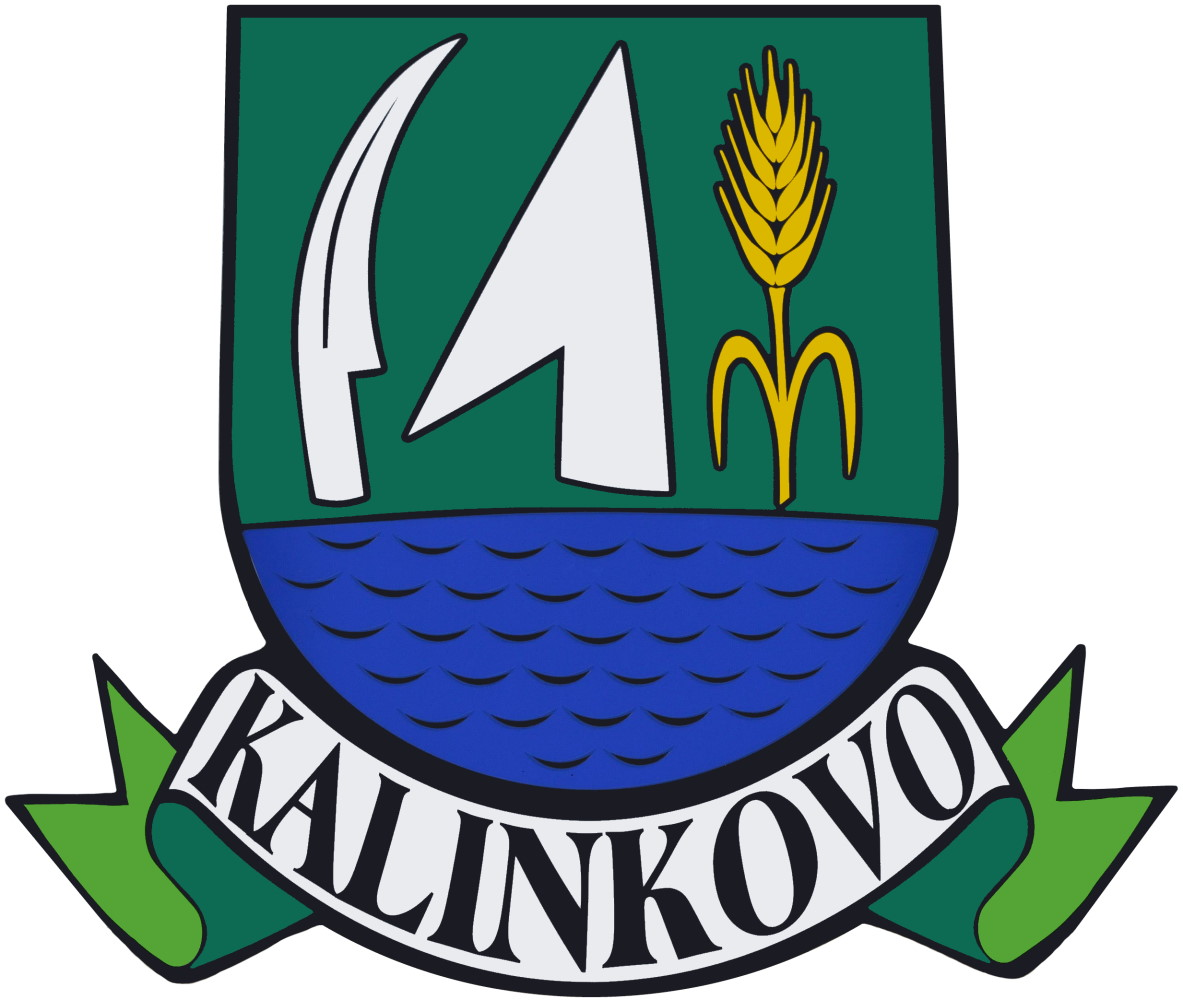
- Flag Coat of arms

- Location of Kalinkovo in the Bratislava Region Location of Kalinkovo in Slovakia
- Coordinates: 48.07°N 17.25°E
- Country: Slovakia
- Region: Bratislava Region
- District: Senec District
- First mentioned: 1288

Area
  - Total: 12.91 km^{2} (4.98 sq mi)
- Elevation: 129 m (423 ft)

Population (2025)
  - Total: 1,574
- Time zone: UTC+1 (CET)
  - Summer (DST): UTC+2 (CEST)
- Postal code: 900 43
- Area code: +421 15
- Vehicle registration plate (until 2022): SC
- Website: www.obeckalinkovo.sk

Kalinkovo (Hungarian: Szemet) is a village and municipality in western Slovakia in Senec District in the Bratislava Region.

== History ==
The village was first mentioned in 1258 as Dénešdi village and later in 1288 as Šemet. In 1948 the name was changed to Kalinkovo that carries today.

== Geography ==
The municipality lies at an altitude of 129 metres (423 ft) and covers an area of 12.91 km^{2} (4.98 sq mi) (2025).

== Population ==
Population statistic (10 years)
Year	1995	2005	2015	2025
Count	849	986	1273	1574
Difference		+16.13%	+29.10%	+23.64%

Population statistic
Year	2024	2025
Count	1564	1574
Difference		+0.63%

It has a population of 1574 people (31 December 2025).

=== Ethnicity ===
Census 2021 (1+ %)
Ethnicity	Number	Fraction
Slovak	1167	79.55%
Hungarian	273	18.6%
Not found out	38	2.59%
Czech	19	1.29%
Other	15	1.02%
Total	1467	

In year 2021 was 1467 people by ethnicity 1167 as Slovak, 273 as Hungarian, 38 as Not found out, 19 as Czech, 15 as Other, 9 as Russian, 6 as Ukrainian, 6 as Rusyn, 6 as German, 4 as Romani, 1 as Iranian and 1 as Greek.

Note on population: The difference values of population numbers in the table "Population statistic" and in the sections "Ethnicity" & "Religion" is caused by the use of various statistical methods.

=== Religion ===
Census 2021 (1+ %)
Religion	Number	Fraction
Roman Catholic Church	820	55.9%
None	518	35.31%
Evangelical Church	30	2.04%
Not found out	29	1.98%
Total	1467	

In year 2021 was 1467 people by religion 820 from Roman Catholic Church, 518 from None, 30 from Evangelical Church, 29 from Not found out, 12 from Greek Catholic Church, 10 from Christian Congregations in Slovakia, 7 from Calvinist Church, 6 from Eastern Orthodox Church, 6 from Apostolic Church, 4 from Old Catholic Church, 4 from Jehovah's Witnesses, 4 from Other, 4 from Ad hoc movements, 3 from Buddhism, 2 from Islam, 2 from Baptists Church, 2 from Bahá'i Community, 1 from Jewish community, 1 from Paganism and natural spirituality, 1 from Other and not ascertained christian church and 1 from Hinduism.

== Facilities ==
The village has a public library, post office, gas distribution network and a football pitch. In the centre of the village is one big church (in comparison with other neighbour villages) called Kostol sv. Františka z Assisi.In this village you can also find a small graveyard with 3 meters tall jesus on the cross statue.

== Genealogical resources ==
The records for genealogical research are available at the state archive "Statny Archiv in Bratislava, Slovakia"

- Roman Catholic church records (births/marriages/deaths): 1672-1896 (parish B)
- Lutheran church records (births/marriages/deaths): 1706-1895 (parish B)

== See also ==
- List of municipalities and towns in Slovakia

== External links/Sources ==
- Media related to Kalinkovo at Wikimedia Commons
- Official page
- https://web.archive.org/web/20070513023228/http://www.statistics.sk/mosmis/eng/run.html
- Surnames of living people in Kalinkovo
