= Miroslav Nemec (footballer) =

Slovak footballer and manager (born 1971)

Personal information
- Full name: Miroslav Nemec
- Date of birth: 26 September 1971 (age 55)
- Place of birth: Banská Bystrica, Slovakia
- Height: 1.84 m (6 ft 0 in)
- Position: Forward

Team information
- Current team: Tadamon Sour SC (Technical manager)

Youth career
- 1984–1990: Agrostav Sásová

Senior career*
Years	Team	Apps	(Gls)
1990–1992	Banská Bystrica "B"		
1993–1996	FC Selce		
1996–1998	Tatran Prešov	76	(16)
1998–1999	1. FC Košice	10	(1)
1999	DAC Dunajská Streda	8	(2)
1999-2000	F.C. Ashdod	18	(4)
2000–2001	1. FC Košice	28	(3)
2001–2003	MŠK Žilina	52	(10)
2003–2004	FK Matador Púchov	35	(6)
2004–2005	FK Atyrau	22	(6)
2005–2006	FC Ekibastuzets	14	(2)

Managerial career
- 2006–2008: Žilina B
- 2013–2014: Žilina U19
- 2014–2015: Žilina B
- 2006–2015: MŠK Žilina A team (assistant)
- 2015–2015: Podbeskidzie Bielsko-Biała (assistant)
- 2015–2016: OFK Teplička nad Váhom
- 2016–2017: MFK Frýdek Frístek
- 2017–2020: FC Talent Vision
- 2020: FC Nitra
- 2021–2022: Zemplín Michalovce
- 2022: Tvrdošín
- 2023: FC Talent Vision
- 2024-2025: TJ Jednota Bánová
- 2025-: FK Humenné
- * Club domestic league appearances and goals

Miroslav Nemec (born 26 September 1971) is a Slovak football manager and former football player. He last served as the manager of Zemplín Michalovce.

== Playing career ==
Miroslav Nemec's football career began at Agrostav Sásová where he played since he was twelve years old and lasted until the beginning of his compulsory military service. During compulsory military service he played for "B" team Dukla Banská Bystrica. After finishing compulsory military service he played for TJ Selce (the third league). From 1996, he has played at following teams: Tatran Prešov, 1. FC Košice, DAC Dunajská Streda, MŠK Žilina, Matador Púchov, FK Atyrau (Kazakhstan), and FC Ekibastuzets (Kazakhstan). After his return from Kazakhstan he retired from his active football career in 1996. During the 2011/2012 season, he was a member of the TOP Eleven ObFZ Žilina.

After he quit his football career he switched to the position of a football coach. He worked as an assistant head coach of MŠK Žilina, as well as head coach of U-19 and reserve teams. He worked as an assistant to head coach Dariusz Kubicki in Podbeskidzie Bielsko-Biała in Poland in Ekstraklasa. From October 2015 he was a head coach of the team OFK Teplička nad Váhom, participant in II. league (DOXXbet league). He led to save the team in II. league. From October 2015 he was a head coach of the team MFK Frýdek-Místek (II. ligue), Czech Republic. He led to save the team in II. league. From 2017 to February 2020 he was head coach of A team Telen Vision, Zimbabwe. From January to July 2020, he worked in the FC Nitra team as an assistant and head coach. From 2024 is Miroslav Nemec Technical Manager in Tadamon Sour SC Lebanon.

== European club matches ==
- 2003/2004: FK Matador Púchov: UEFA Cup (4 matches/2 goals—FC Sioni Bolnisi, FC Barcelona)
- 2002/2003: MŠK Žilina: Champions League (2 matches—FC Basel 1893)
- 2000/2001: 1. FK Košice: UEFA Cup (2 matches—GAK Graz)

== Achievements ==
- 2008 (MŠK Žilina): participation at group stage of the UEFA Cup (assistant of head coach Dušan Radolský)
- 2010 (MŠK Žilina): participation at group stage of the Champions League (assistant of head coach Pavel Hapal)
- 2002, 2003 (MŠK Žilina): Slovak football champion (player's career)
- 2007, 2010, 2012 (MŠK Žilina): Slovak football champion (assistant of head coach Pavel Vrba, Pavel Hapal, Frans Adelaar)
- 2012 (MŠK Žilina): winner of Slovak Cup (assistant of head coach Frans Adelaar)
- 2026 (FK Humenné): Winner of 3. Liga, 2025–26 (promoted)
