= Stráňavy =

- Municipality
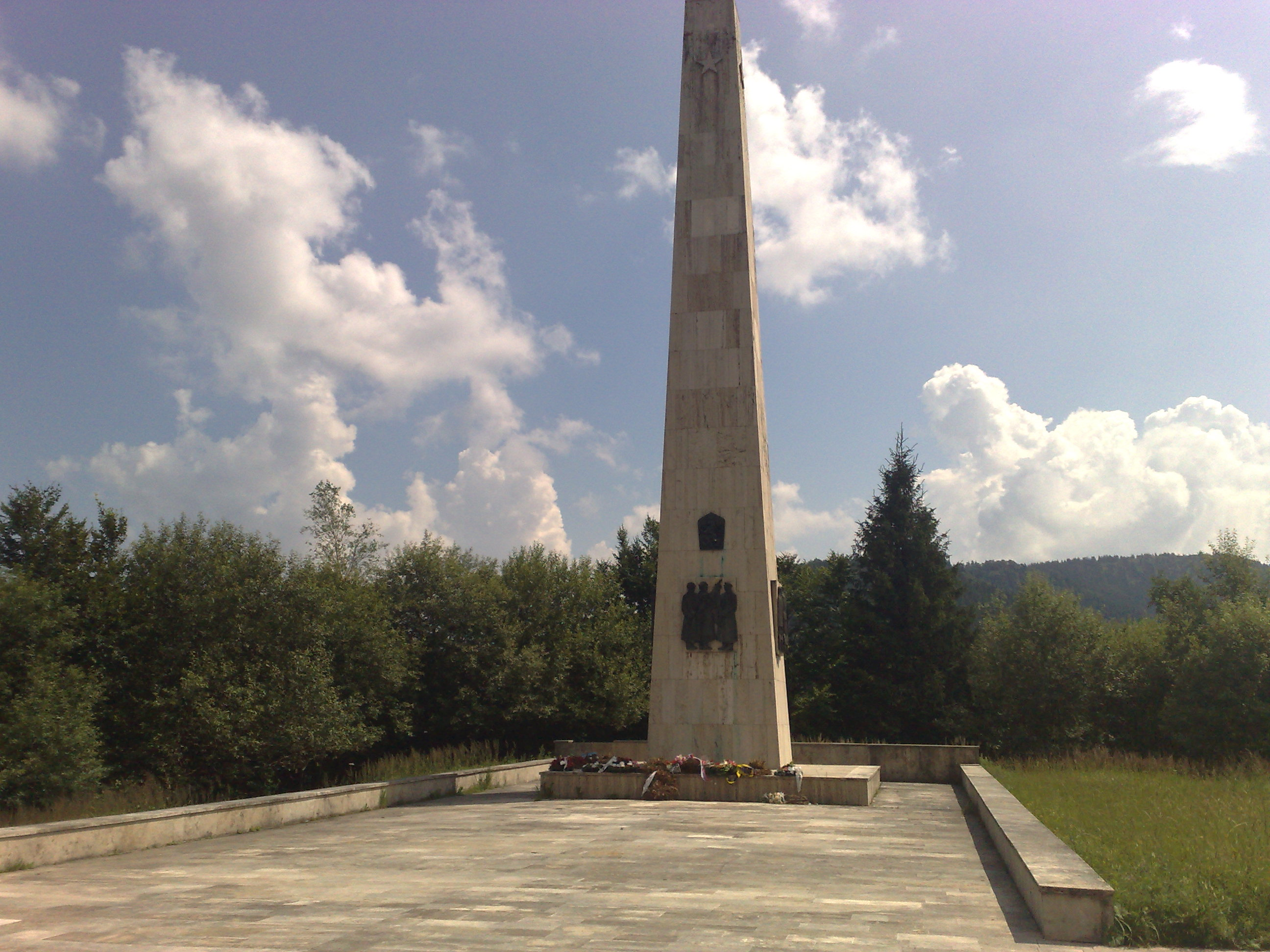

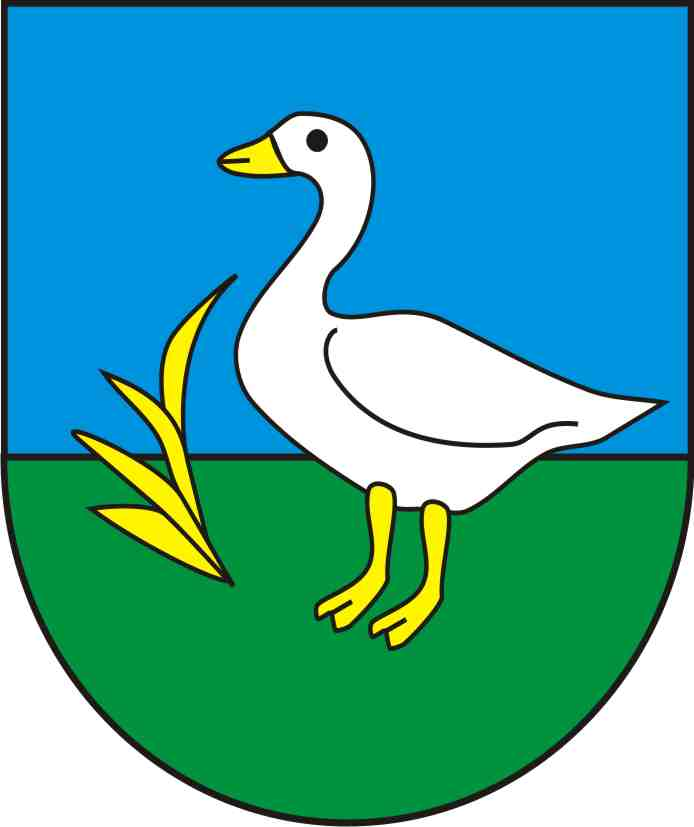
- Flag Coat of arms

- Location of Stráňavy in the Žilina Region Location of Stráňavy in Slovakia
- Coordinates: 49.18°N 18.82°E
- Country: Slovakia
- Region: Žilina Region
- District: Žilina District
- First mentioned: 1356

Area
  - Total: 10.87 km^{2} (4.20 sq mi)
- Elevation: 425 m (1,394 ft)

Population (2025)
  - Total: 1,874
- Time zone: UTC+1 (CET)
  - Summer (DST): UTC+2 (CEST)
- Postal code: 132 5
- Area code: +421 41
- Vehicle registration plate (until 2022): ZA
- Website: www.stranavy.sk

Stráňavy (Hungarian: Felsőosztorány) is a village and municipality in Žilina District in the Žilina Region of northern Slovakia. It lies below the mountain Polom.

== History ==
In historical records the village was first mentioned in 1356. The coat-of-arms and the seal picture a bird feeding in a meadow.

Since 1598, the village has grown from 22 houses to 430 houses and counts presently 1,838 inhabitants. Stranavy has a well-developed social and technical infrastructure and pays much attention to tourism. There is a thermal bath (24-26 °C), accommodation and food facilities.

== Geography ==
The municipality lies at an altitude of 425 metres (1,394 ft) and covers an area of 10.87 km^{2} (4.20 sq mi) (2025).

== Population ==
Population statistic (10 years)
Year	1995	2005	2015	2025
Count	1769	1829	1862	1874
Difference		+3.39%	+1.80%	+0.64%

Population statistic
Year	2024	2025
Count	1897	1874
Difference		−1.21%

It has a population of 1874 people (31 December 2025).

=== Ethnicity ===
Census 2021 (1+ %)
Ethnicity	Number	Fraction
Slovak	1845	96.29%
Not found out	60	3.13%
Czech	22	1.14%
Total	1916	

In year 2021 was 1916 people by ethnicity 1845 as Slovak, 60 as Not found out, 22 as Czech, 12 as Other, 5 as Russian, 4 as German, 4 as French, 3 as Hungarian, 1 as Italian, 1 as Rusyn, 1 as Austrian and 1 as Polish.

Note on population: The difference values of population numbers in the table "Population statistic" and in the sections "Ethnicity" & "Religion" is caused by the use of various statistical methods.

=== Religion ===
Census 2021 (1+ %)
Religion	Number	Fraction
Roman Catholic Church	1467	76.57%
None	344	17.95%
Not found out	56	2.92%
Total	1916	

In year 2021 was 1916 people by religion 1467 from Roman Catholic Church, 344 from None, 56 from Not found out, 17 from Greek Catholic Church, 13 from Evangelical Church, 7 from Christian Congregations in Slovakia, 5 from Ad hoc movements, 3 from Calvinist Church, 1 from Paganism and natural spirituality, 1 from Other and not ascertained christian church, 1 from Jehovah's Witnesses and 1 from Islam.
