= MŠK Slovan Trenčianske Teplice =

Slovak football club

- Full name: MŠK Slovan Trenčianske Teplice
- Founded: 1921
- Ground: Štadión Marakana, Trenčianske Teplice
- Capacity: 1,000
- Head coach: Marek Bubenko
- League: 3. Liga
- Website: https://mskslovan.webnode.sk/

MŠK Slovan Trenčianske Teplice is a Slovak football team, based in the town of Trenčianske Teplice. The club colours are green and yellow.
