= Vinica, Veľký Krtíš District =

Vinica Ipolynyék
- Municipality
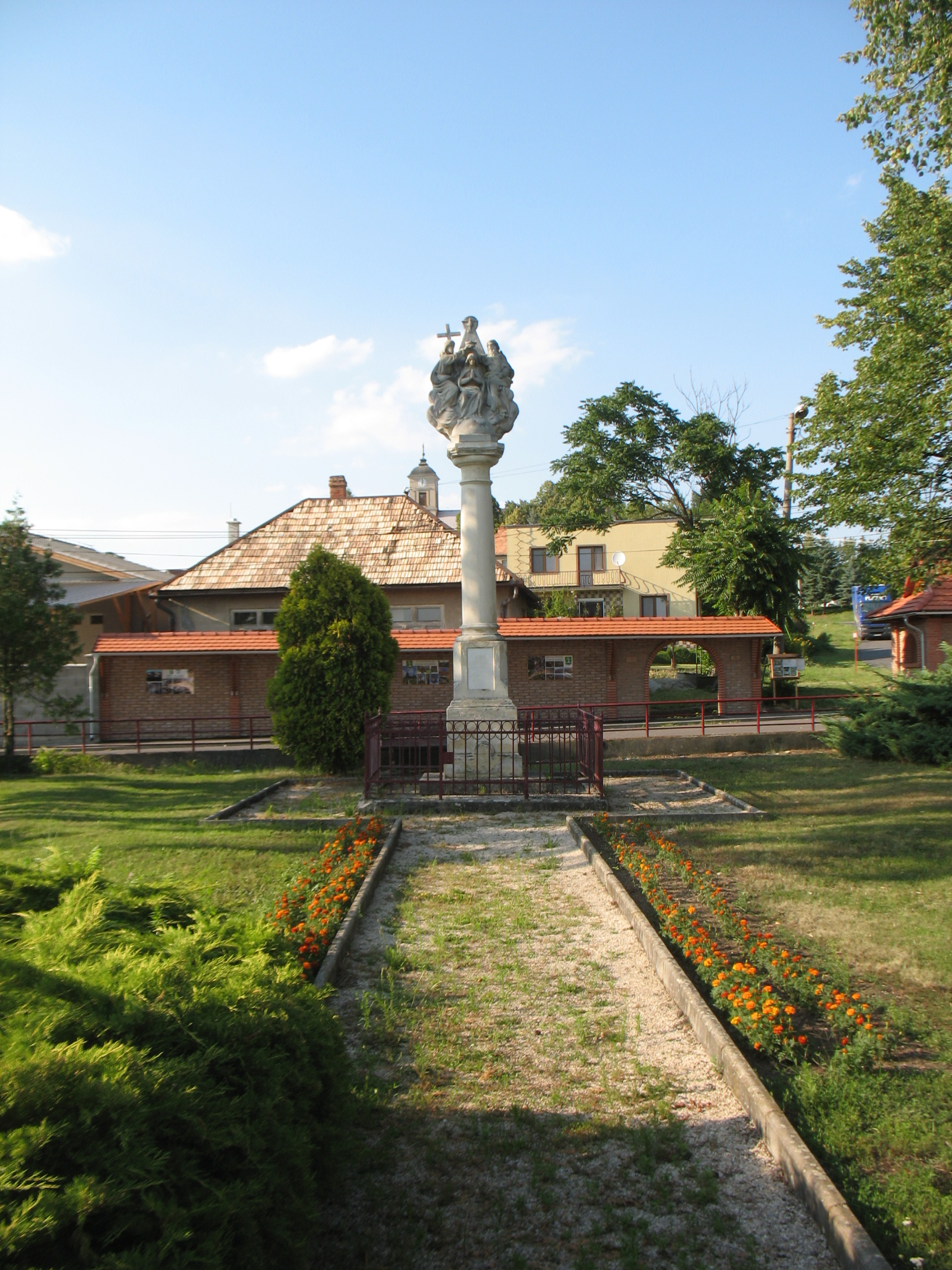

- Flag

- Location of Vinica in the Banská Bystrica Region Location of Vinica in Slovakia
- Coordinates: 48.12°N 19.13°E
- Country: Slovakia
- Region: Banská Bystrica Region
- District: Veľký Krtíš District
- First mentioned: 1156

Area
  - Total: 30.77 km^{2} (11.88 sq mi)
- Elevation: 164 m (538 ft)

Population (2025)
  - Total: 1,758
- Time zone: UTC+1 (CET)
  - Summer (DST): UTC+2 (CEST)
- Postal code: 991 28
- Area code: +421 47
- Vehicle registration plate (until 2022): VK
- Website: www.vinica.sk

Vinica (Hungarian: Ipolynyék) is a village and municipality in the Veľký Krtíš District of the Banská Bystrica Region of southern Slovakia.

== Population ==
Population statistic (10 years)
Year	1995	2005	2015	2025
Count	1950	1910	1808	1758
Difference		−2.05%	−5.34%	−2.76%

Population statistic
Year	2024	2025
Count	1748	1758
Difference		+0.57%

It has a population of 1758 people (31 December 2025).

=== Ethnicity ===
Census 2021 (1+ %)
Ethnicity	Number	Fraction
Hungarian	1485	82.77%
Slovak	352	19.62%
Not found out	69	3.84%
Total	1794	

In year 2021 was 1794 people by ethnicity 1485 as Hungarian, 352 as Slovak, 69 as Not found out, 8 as Czech, 2 as Ukrainian, 1 as Romani, 1 as Russian and 1 as Other.

Note on population: The difference values of population numbers in the table "Population statistic" and in the sections "Ethnicity" & "Religion" is caused by the use of various statistical methods.

=== Religion ===
Census 2021 (1+ %)
Religion	Number	Fraction
Roman Catholic Church	1543	86.01%
None	131	7.3%
Not found out	54	3.01%
Evangelical Church	22	1.23%
Greek Catholic Church	18	1%
Total	1794	

In year 2021 was 1794 people by religion 1543 from Roman Catholic Church, 131 from None, 54 from Not found out, 22 from Evangelical Church, 18 from Greek Catholic Church, 9 from Christian Congregations in Slovakia, 7 from Calvinist Church, 4 from Jehovah's Witnesses, 1 from Old Catholic Church, 1 from Other and not ascertained christian church, 1 from Other, 1 from Seventh-day Adventist Church, 1 from Buddhism and 1 from Baptists Church.
