= FK Vajnory =

Slovak football club

- Full name: FK Vajnory
- Founded: 1933
- Ground: Stadium FK Vajnory, Vajnory, Slovakia
- Capacity: 450 (250 seats)
- Head coach: Radoslav Kunzo
- League: 3. Liga (Bratislava)
- 2015–16: 4. liga (Bratislava), 1st (promoted)
- Website: http://www.fkvajnory.sk/

FK Vajnory is a Slovak association football club located in Vajnory. It currently plays in 3. Liga (Bratislava) (3rd level).
