= Vyšný Mirošov =

- Municipality
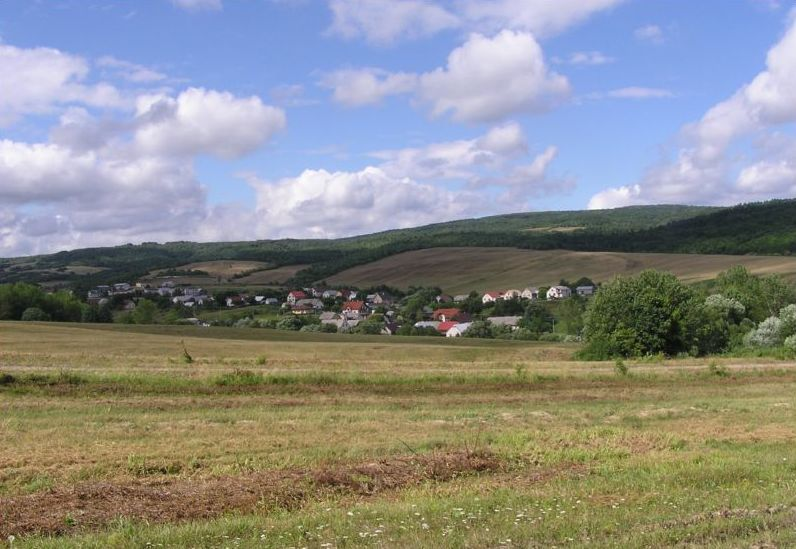

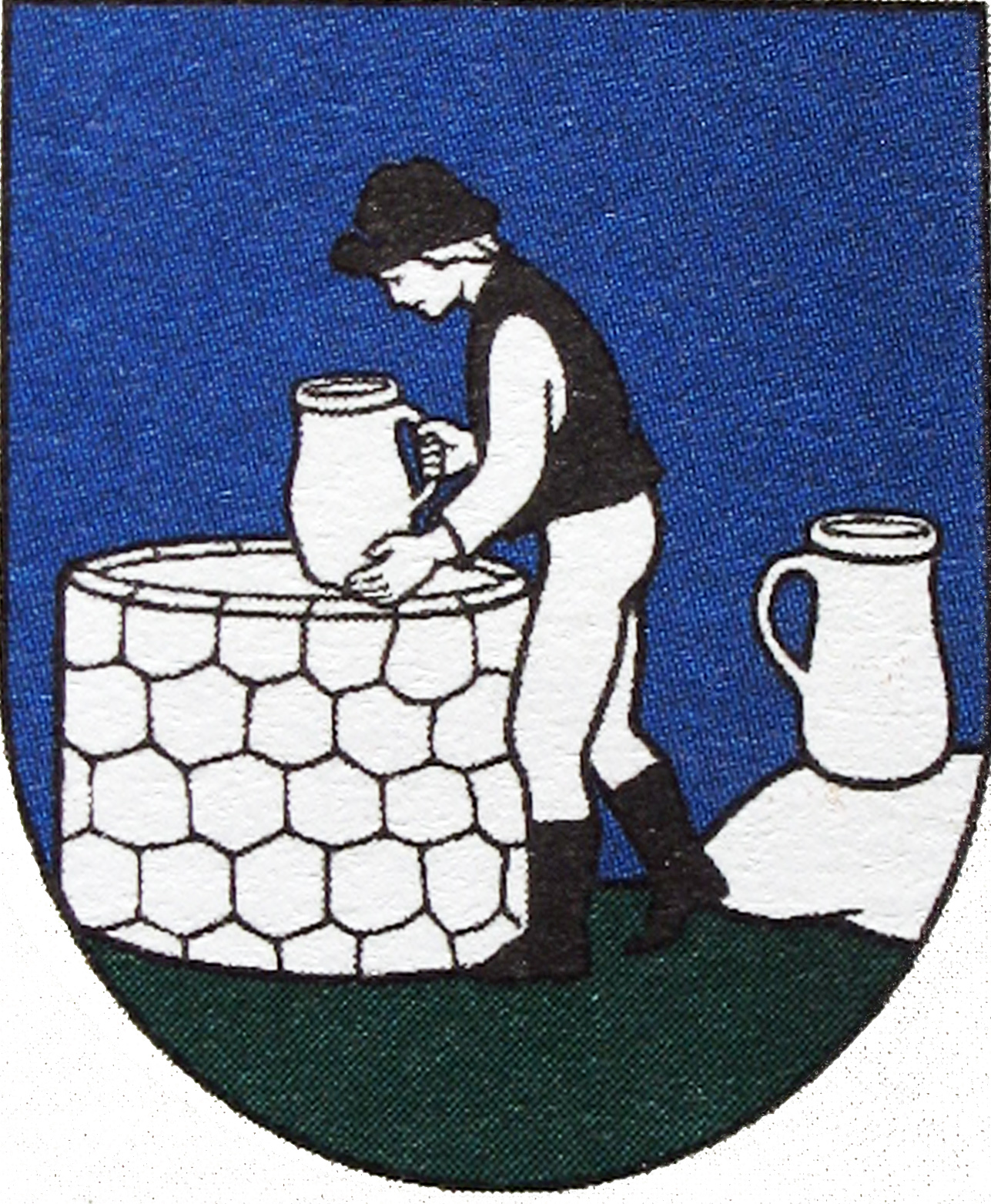
- Flag Coat of arms

- Location of Vyšný Mirošov in the Prešov Region Location of Vyšný Mirošov in Slovakia
- Coordinates: 49.39°N 21.45°E
- Country: Slovakia
- Region: Prešov Region
- District: Svidník District
- First mentioned: 1567

Government
  - Mayor: Jana Stešková (Independent)

Area
  - Total: 12.69 km^{2} (4.90 sq mi)
- Elevation: 345 m (1,132 ft)

Population (2025)
  - Total: 562
- Time zone: UTC+1 (CET)
  - Summer (DST): UTC+2 (CEST)
- Postal code: 901 1
- Area code: +421 54
- Vehicle registration plate (until 2022): SK
- Website: www.vysnymirosov.sk

Vyšný Mirošov is a village and municipality in Svidník District in the Prešov Region of north-eastern Slovakia.

== History ==
In historical records the village was first mentioned in 1567.

== Geography ==
The municipality lies at an altitude of 345 metres (1,132 ft) and covers an area of 12.69 km^{2} (4.90 sq mi) (2025).

== Population ==
Population statistic (10 years)
Year	1995	2005	2015	2025
Count	537	579	588	562
Difference		+7.82%	+1.55%	−4.42%

Population statistic
Year	2024	2025
Count	572	562
Difference		−1.74%

It has a population of 562 people (31 December 2025).

=== Ethnicity ===
Census 2021 (1+ %)
Ethnicity	Number	Fraction
Slovak	429	71.85%
Rusyn	272	45.56%
Romani	101	16.91%
Not found out	16	2.68%
Russian	11	1.84%
Ukrainian	7	1.17%
Total	597	

In year 2021 was 597 people by ethnicity 429 as Slovak, 272 as Rusyn, 101 as Romani, 16 as Not found out, 11 as Russian, 7 as Ukrainian, 5 as Czech and 1 as English.

Note on population: The difference values of population numbers in the table "Population statistic" and in the sections "Ethnicity" & "Religion" is caused by the use of various statistical methods.

=== Religion ===
Census 2021 (1+ %)
Religion	Number	Fraction
Eastern Orthodox Church	492	82.41%
Greek Catholic Church	38	6.37%
Roman Catholic Church	33	5.53%
None	22	3.69%
Not found out	8	1.34%
Total	597	

In year 2021 was 597 people by religion 492 from Eastern Orthodox Church, 38 from Greek Catholic Church, 33 from Roman Catholic Church, 22 from None, 8 from Not found out, 2 from Evangelical Church, 1 from Jehovah's Witnesses and 1 from Other.
