= MŠK - Thermál Veľký Meder =

Slovak football club

- Full name: MŠK - Thermál Veľký Meder
- Founded: TBA
- Ground: Stadium Veľký Meder, Veľký Meder, Slovakia
- Capacity: 1,500
- President: Ivan Bobkovič
- Manager: Csaba Szórád
- League: 3. liga, (West)

MŠK - Thermál Veľký Meder is a Slovak association football club located in Veľký Meder. It currently plays in Slovak IV. liga south-east.

== Colors and badge ==
Its colors are green and white.

== Notable players ==
Had international caps for their respective countries. Players whose name is listed in bold represented their countries while playing for Thermál.

- (Hungary) István Ferenczi
- (Slovakia) Peter Lérant
- (Niger) Siradji Sani
