= MFK Nová Dubnica =

Slovak football club

FK Nová Dubnica
- Full name: Futbalový klub Nová Dubnica
- Founded: 1956
- Ground: MFK Nová Dubnica Stadium, Nová Dubnica
- Capacity: 1,000 (300 seats)
- President: Peter Švec
- Head coach: Michal Ranuša
- League: 6. Liga
- Website: http://www.mfknovadubnica.sk/

FK Nová Dubnica (full name: Futbalový klub Nová Dubnica) is a Slovak football team, based in the town of Nová Dubnica. The club currently plays in the 6. Liga North group, the 6th tier of Slovak football.

== History ==
Sports in Nová Dubnica began with the founding of TJ Tatran in 1956, initially as a football club. Over the years, the club evolved, changing names and developing infrastructure, including a stadium built between 1961 and 1967. In 1961, a sports stadium was beginning to be constructed, which would include a football pitch, an athletic track, and sand pits. A stand for 500 spectators was built, along with six tiers of stands around the stadium, with a total capacity of 12,000 spectators. In 1989, significant changes occurred both in society and football life in Nová Dubnica, resulting in the TJ Slovan ZVS club losing financial support and cease to exits in 1991.

In 1995, the MFK men's team was promoted to the V league. On October 26, 2017, FK Nová Dubnica was established.
