= Filip Racko =

Czech footballer

Personal information
- Date of birth: 20 July 1985 (age 41)
- Place of birth: Havířov, Czechoslovakia
- Position: Attacking midfielder

Youth career
- –2003: Banik Ostrava

Senior career*
Years	Team	Apps	(Gls)
2003–2006	Banik Ostrava	2	(1)
2004–2005	→ SK Kladno (loan)		
2006–2010	1. FC Slovácko	31	(3)
2008–2009	→ FC Nitra (loan)	23	(2)
2010	→ FC Vitkovice (loan)	7	(0)
2010–2011	FC Zenit Čáslav	19	(3)
2011–2013	Lokomotive Leipzig	20	(3)
- * Club domestic league appearances and goals as of 10 August 2011

Filip Racko (born 20 July 1985) is a Czech footballer who played in the First League for Banik Ostrava and 1. FC Slovácko.
