= FK Stupava =

- Full name: FK Stupava
- Founded: 1921
- Dissolved: 2016 (merged with NMŠK 1922 Bratislava)
- Ground: Štadión Stupava, Stupava
- Capacity: 800 (300 seats)
- Chairman: Miroslav Beleš
- Head coach: Ivan Morávek
- League: 3. liga
- 2013-14: 10th

FK Stupava (until 2013 as FK Tatran Stupava) was a Slovak football team, based in the town of Stupava, Malacky District. The club was founded in 1921.
