= FC Rohožník =

Slovak football club

- Full name: FC Rohožník
- Founded: 1919
- Ground: FC Rohožník Stadium, Rohožník
- President: Vladimír Báchor
- Head coach: Szilárd Németh
- League: 3. Liga
- 2021–22: 2. liga, 13th of 16
- Website: http://www.fcrohoznik.sk

FC Rohožník is a Slovak football team, based in the town of Rohožník. It currently plays in Slovak 2. liga, the second tier of Slovak football.

== Honours ==
- Slovak third division (Group Bratislava) (1993–)
  - Winners (1): 2020–21

== Colours ==
Club colours are red, yellow and blue.

== Current squad ==
As of 30 September 2021. Note: Flags indicate national team as defined under FIFA eligibility rules; some limited exceptions apply. Players may hold more than one non-FIFA nationality.

No.	Pos.	Nation	Player
1	GK	CZE	Jakub Trefil (on loan from Sigma Olomouc)
2	DF	SVK	Martin Ambra
4	DF	SVK	Matúš Hitka
5	DF	SVK	Stanislav Škuta
7	MF	SVK	Sebastián Prášek (on loan from Dunajská Streda)
8	MF	SVK	Martin Privrel
10	FW	SVK	Filip Tomovič
11	FW	SVK	Roman Bekö
13	DF	SVK	Juraj Kiss
14	MF	SVK	Peter Fila
19	DF	SVK	Samuel Milota

No.	Pos.	Nation	Player
19	DF	SVK	Samuel Milota
20	MF	SVK	Viktor Žilinský
21	FW	SVK	Jozef Hermann
22	GK	SVK	Adam Havlík
23	FW	SVK	David Meliš
27	MF	SVK	Marek Frimmel
32	GK	SVK	Dominik Kolena
89	MF	SVN	Rok Mohorko
97	DF	SVK	Marek Pittner
—	FW	SVK	Viktor Vondryska

For recent transfers, see List of Slovak football transfers winter 2021–22.
