= FC Ružinov Bratislava =

Slovak football club

- Full name: FC Ružinov Bratislava
- Founded: 1919; 107 years ago
- Ground: futbalový štadión FK Rapid, Ružinov
- Manager: Róbert Kain
- League: 7. liga

FC Ružinov Bratislava is a Slovak football team, based in the city of Bratislava in the part of city named Ružinov. The club was founded in 1919.
