= Teplička nad Váhom =

Village and municipality in Slovakia

- Municipality
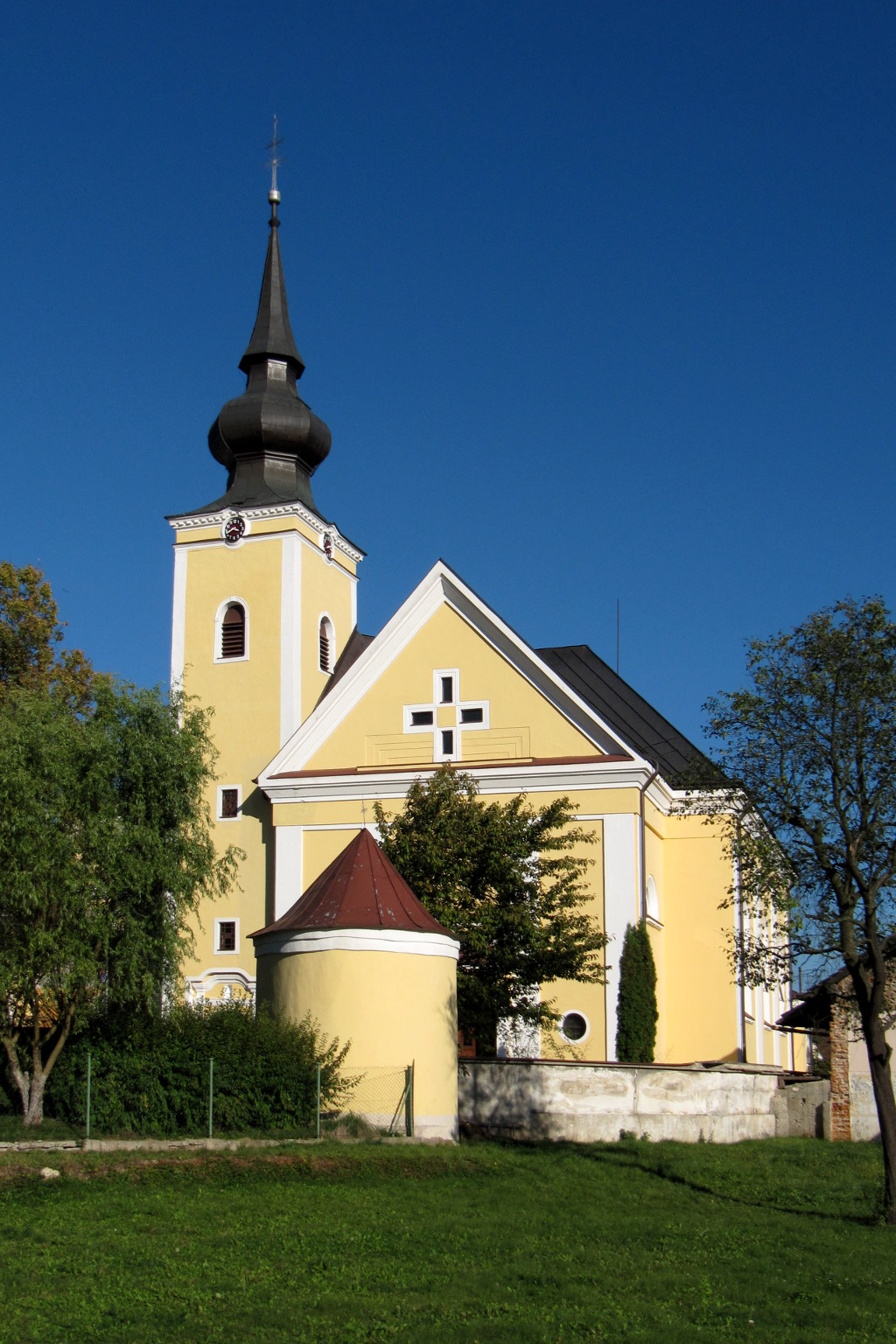
- Saint Martin church

- Flag

- Location of Teplička nad Váhom in the Žilina Region Location of Teplička nad Váhom in Slovakia
- Coordinates: 49.23°N 18.80°E
- Country: Slovakia
- Region: Žilina Region
- District: Žilina District
- First mentioned: 1267

Area
  - Total: 10.87 km^{2} (4.20 sq mi)
- Elevation: 340 m (1,120 ft)

Population (2025)
  - Total: 4,359
- Time zone: UTC+1 (CET)
  - Summer (DST): UTC+2 (CEST)
- Postal code: 130 1
- Area code: +421 41
- Vehicle registration plate (until 2022): ZA
- Website: www.teplickanadvahom.sk

Teplička nad Váhom (Hungarian: Vágtapolca) is a village and municipality in Žilina District in the Žilina Region of northern Slovakia.

== History ==
In historical records the village was first mentioned in 1267. The village was the birthplace of the Hungarian noble Zsófia Bosnyák (Slovak: Žofia Bosniaková), who is the unofficial patron saint of Teplička nad Váhom.

Kia Motors car manufacturing plant has been operationg in Teplička nad Váhom since 2006.

== Geography ==
The municipality lies at an altitude of 340 metres (1,120 ft) and covers an area of 10.87 km^{2} (4.20 sq mi) (2025).

== Population ==
Population statistic (10 years)
Year	1995	2005	2015	2025
Count	3285	3428	4075	4359
Difference		+4.35%	+18.87%	+6.96%

Population statistic
Year	2024	2025
Count	4389	4359
Difference		−0.68%

It has a population of 4359 people (31 December 2025).

=== Ethnicity ===
Census 2021 (1+%)
Ethnicity	Number	Fraction
Slovak	4236	96.73%
Not found out	129	2.94%
Total	4379	

In year 2021 was 4379 people by ethnicity 4236 as Slovak, 129 as Not found out, 20 as Czech, 15 as Other, 8 as Ukrainian, 3 as Russian, 3 as Moravian, 3 as Hungarian, 3 as Iranian, 2 as Chinese, 2 as Italian, 2 as Romani, 2 as Romanian, 2 as German, 2 as Croatian, 1 as Silesian, 1 as Austrian, 1 as French and 1 as Albanian.

Note on population: The difference values of population numbers in the table "Population statistic" and in the sections "Ethnicity" & "Religion" is caused by the use of various statistical methods.

=== Religion ===
Census 2021 (1+%)
Religion	Number	Fraction
Roman Catholic Church	3413	77.94%
None	638	14.57%
Not found out	142	3.24%
Evangelical Church	59	1.35%
Total	4379	

In year 2021 was 4379 people by religion 3413 from Roman Catholic Church, 638 from None, 142 from Not found out, 59 from Evangelical Church, 28 from Christian Congregations in Slovakia, 18 from Other, 18 from Greek Catholic Church, 15 from Ad hoc movements, 11 from Other and not ascertained christian church, 6 from Islam, 5 from Eastern Orthodox Church, 5 from Jehovah's Witnesses, 5 from Baptists Church, 4 from Calvinist Church, 4 from Buddhism, 3 from Seventh-day Adventist Church, 2 from Paganism and natural spirituality, 2 from Apostolic Church and 1 from Church of Jesus Christ of Latter-day Saints.
