= Rohožník, Malacky District =

Rohožník Nádasfő
- Municipality
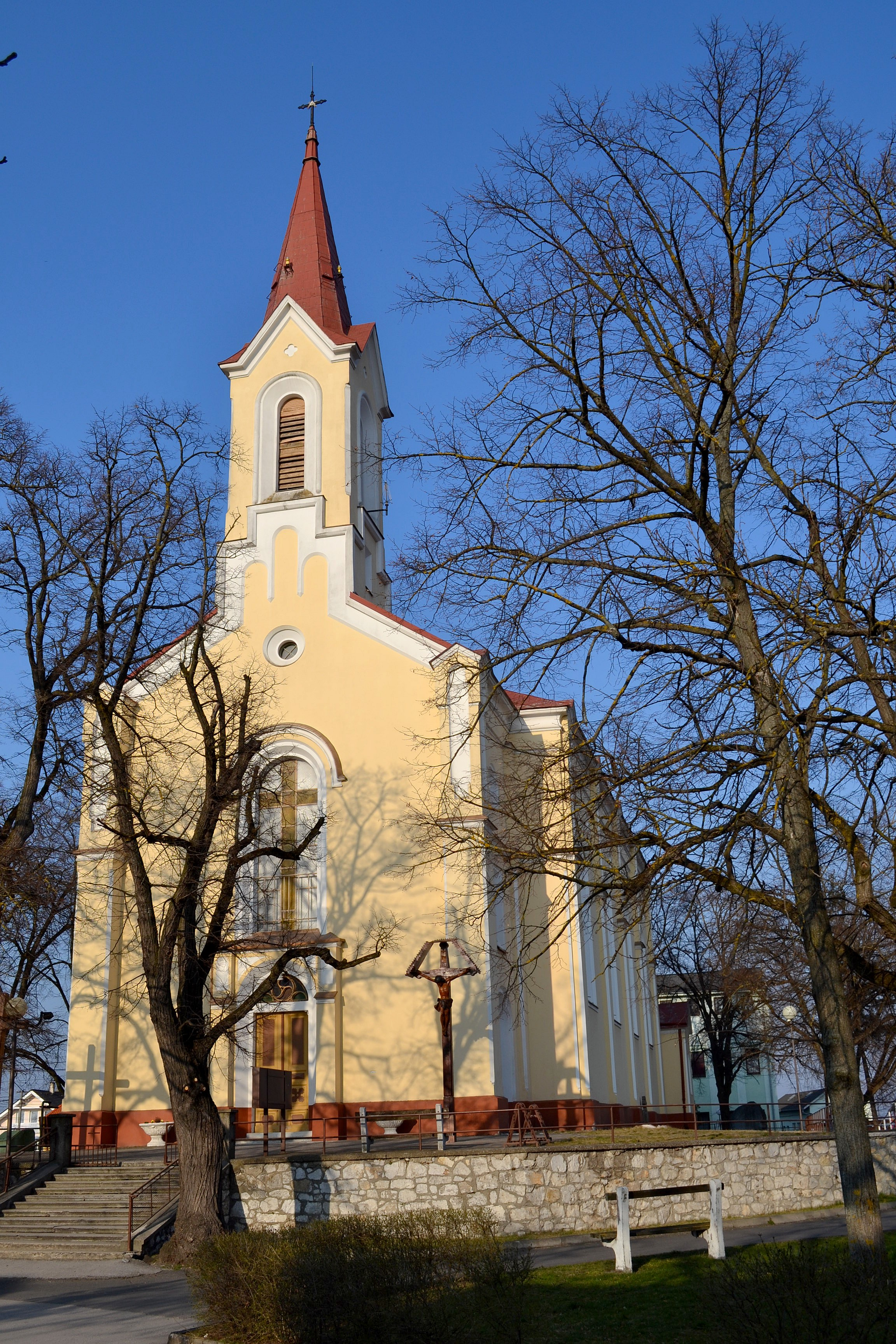
- Church of the Assumption of the Virgin Mary

- Flag Coat of arms

- Location of Rohožník in the Bratislava Region Location of Rohožník in Slovakia
- Coordinates: 48°27′19″N 17°10′3″E
- Country: Slovakia
- Region: Bratislava Region
- District: Malacky District
- First mentioned: 1532

Government
  - Mayor: Peter Švaral

Area
  - Total: 27.47 km^{2} (10.61 sq mi)
- Elevation: 201 m (659 ft)

Population (2025)
  - Total: 3,516
- Time zone: UTC+1 (CET)
  - Summer (DST): UTC+2 (CEST)
- Postal code: 906 38
- Area code: +421 34
- Vehicle registration plate (until 2022): MA
- Website: rohoznik.sk

Rohožník (German: Rohrbach; Hungarian: Nádasfő) is a village in Malacky District in the Bratislava Region of western Slovakia close to the town of Malacky, northwest of Slovakia's capital Bratislava.

== History ==
First historical record about the village is from book of Hungarian historian Carolus Péterffy "Sacra concilia ecclesiae Romano-inquistitae in regno Hungariae celebrata" from year 1397.

== Geography ==
The municipality lies at an altitude of 201 metres (659 ft) and covers an area of 27.47 km^{2} (10.61 sq mi) (2025).

== Population ==
Population statistic (10 years)
Year	1995	2005	2015	2025
Count	3315	3510	3462	3516
Difference		+5.88%	−1.36%	+1.55%

Population statistic
Year	2024	2025
Count	3523	3516
Difference		−0.19%

It has a population of 3516 people (31 December 2025).

=== Ethnicity ===
Census 2021 (1+ %)
Ethnicity	Number	Fraction
Slovak	3294	91.09%
Not found out	307	8.49%
Total	3616	

In year 2021 was 3616 people by ethnicity 3294 as Slovak, 307 as Not found out, 28 as Czech, 22 as Romani, 13 as Hungarian, 12 as Other, 11 as Romanian, 5 as German, 3 as Serbian, 3 as Rusyn, 2 as Austrian, 2 as Polish, 1 as Vietnamese, 1 as Turkish, 1 as Croatian and 1 as English.

Note on population: The difference values of population numbers in the table "Population statistic" and in the sections "Ethnicity" & "Religion" is caused by the use of various statistical methods.

=== Religion ===
Census 2021 (1+ %)
Religion	Number	Fraction
Roman Catholic Church	2098	58.02%
None	1070	29.59%
Not found out	300	8.3%
Evangelical Church	65	1.8%
Total	3616	

In year 2021 was 3616 people by religion 2098 from Roman Catholic Church, 1070 from None, 300 from Not found out, 65 from Evangelical Church, 25 from Greek Catholic Church, 12 from Ad hoc movements, 11 from Christian Congregations in Slovakia, 7 from Eastern Orthodox Church, 5 from Calvinist Church, 5 from Islam, 4 from Other, 4 from Buddhism, 4 from Apostolic Church, 2 from Jewish community, 2 from Paganism and natural spirituality, 1 from Jehovah's Witnesses and 1 from Church of Jesus Christ of Latter-day Saints.
