= 1994–95 Slovak Cup =

Tournament details
- Country: Slovakia
- Teams: 32

Final positions
- Champions: Inter Bratislava
- Runners-up: DAC Dunajská Streda

The 1994–95 Slovak Cup was the 26th season of Slovakia's annual knock-out cup competition and the second since the independence of Slovakia. It began on 26 July 1994 with the matches of first round and ended on 18 June 1995 with the final. The winners of the competition earned a place in the qualifying round of the UEFA Cup Winners' Cup. Slovan Bratislava were the defending champions.

== First round ==
The games were played on 26, 29 and 30 July and on 2 August 1994.

Team 1	Score	Team 2
Spartak ZŤS Dubnica	2–2 (1–3 p)	Slovan Bratislava
Slovan Bratislava B	3–1	BSC JAS Bardejov
Slovan Hlohovec	1–5	Lokomotíva Košice
SFC Kalinkovo	1–4	Chemlon Humenné
Artmedia Petržalka	2–1	Dukla Banská Bystrica
Matador Púchov	1–3	ŠM Gabčíkovo
ŠKP Bratislava	4–1	Slovan Duslo Šaľa
Slovan Levice	0-1	Spartak Trnava
1. FC Košice B	3–2	MFK Prievidza
Tesla Stropkov	0–1	Inter Bratislava
Slovmag Jelšava	3–0	MŠK Žilina
Dynamo Dolný Kubín	2–4	DAC Dunajská Streda
Texicom Ružomberok	0–0 (2–3 p)	FC Nitra
Kalcit Rožňava	3–1	Slavoj Trebišov
Ozeta Dukla Trenčín	0–1	Tatran Prešov
FC Vráble	0–2	1. FC Košice

== Second round ==
The match ŠM Gabčíkovo – DAC Dunajská Streda was played on 13 September 1994 and the seven games were played on 20 and 21 September 1994.

Team 1	Score	Team 2
ŠM Gabčíkovo	1–1 (1–4 p)	DAC Dunajská Streda
1. FC Košice	2–0	Spartak Trnava
Inter Bratislava	3–0	ŠKP Bratislava
Slovan Bratislava B	4–2	Chemlon Humenné
Kalcit Rožňava	2–4	Slovmag Jelšava
Slovan Bratislava	3–1	FC Nitra
1. FC Košice B	0–1	Artmedia Petržalka
Tatran Prešov	1–1 (7–6 p)	Lokomotíva Košice

Sources: ,

== Quarter-finals ==
The games were played on 25 and 26 October 1994.

Team 1	Score	Team 2
Slovan Bratislava B	0–2	Tatran Prešov
Slovan Bratislava	1–1 (2–4 p)	Inter Bratislava
DAC Dunajská Streda	1–1 (5–4 p)	1. FC Košice
Artmedia Petržalka	1–1 (3–5 p)	Slovmag Jelšava

== Semi-finals ==
The first legs were played on 4 April 1995. The second legs were played on 24 May 1995.

=== First legs ===
4 April 1995	DAC Dunajská Streda	1–1	Slovmag Jelšava	Dunajská Streda
	Bari 10'	Report	Schelling 46'	Stadium: Mestský štadión Attendance: 1,400; Referee: Tibor Jančovič

4 April 1995	Inter Bratislava	1–0	Tatran Prešov	Bratislava
	Medveď 3'	Report		Stadium: Štadión Pasienky; Attendance: 1,300; Referee: Anton Stredák

=== Second legs ===
24 May 1995	Slovmag Jelšava	0–1 (1–2 agg.)	DAC Dunajská Streda	Jelšava
		Report	Bari 31'	Stadium: Futbalový štadión Jelšava; Attendance: 4,200; Referee: Ľuboš Micheľ

24 May 1995	Tatran Prešov	2–3 (2–4 agg.)	Inter Bratislava	Prešov
	Kocúrek 84'; Chihuri 89' (pen.)	Report	Sluka 11'; Greguška 61'; Solár 90'	Stadium: Štadión Tatranu; Attendance: 6,000; Referee: Anton Stredák

== Final ==
18 June 1995
15:30 CEST

Inter Bratislava	1–1 (a.e.t.)	DAC Dunajská Streda
Schulz 90'	Report	Bari 40' (pen.)
Penalties
Obšitník (penalty scored); Luhový (penalty missed); Solar (penalty scored); Greguška (penalty scored)	3–1	(penalty missed) Súkenník; (penalty missed) Zsákovics; (penalty scored) Végh; (penalty missed) Bari

Mestský štadión, Dubnica nad Váhom
Attendance: 5,250
Referee: Ladislav Gádoši
