= 1995–96 Slovak Superliga =

1. Liga
- Season: 1995–96
- Dates: 29 July 1995 – 12 June 1996
- Champions: ŠK Slovan Bratislava
- UEFA Cup: ŠK Slovan Bratislava; 1.FC Košice; FC Chemlon Hummené
- Intertoto Cup: FC Spartak Trnava
- Matches played: 192
- Goals scored: 537 (2.8 per match)
- Top goalscorer: Róbert Semeník (29 goals)
- Biggest home win: Humenné 6:0 D.Streda; Slovan 7:1 D.Streda
- Biggest away win: Prievidza 0:4 Košice; D.Streda 0:4 Inter
- Highest scoring: Slovan 7:1 D.Streda
- Average attendance: ▲3,900

The 1995–96 Slovak First Football League was the third season of first-tier football league in Slovakia, since its establishment in 1993. It began on 29 July 1995 and ended on 12 June 1996. Slovan Bratislava were the defending champions.

== Teams ==
A total of 12 teams was contested in the league, including 11 sides from the 1994–95 season and one promoted from the 2. Liga.

MŠK Žilina was relegated to the 1995–96 2. Liga. The one relegated team was replaced by FC Nitra.

=== Stadiums and locations ===
Location of teams in 1995–96 1. Liga

Team	Home city	Stadium	Capacity
1. FC Košice	Košice	Všešportový areál	30,312
BSC JAS Bardejov	Bardejov	Mestský štadión Bardejov	3,040
Chemlon Humenné	Humenné	Chemlon Stadion	10,000
Dukla Banská Bystrica	Banská Bystrica	SNP Stadium	10,000
DAC 1904 Dunajská Streda	Dunajská Streda	Mestský štadión - DAC Dunajská Streda	16,410
Inter Slovnaft Bratislava	Bratislava	Štadión Pasienky	12,000
Lokomotíva Košice	Košice	Lokomotíva Stadium	9,000
FC Nitra	Nitra	Štadión pod Zoborom	11,384
MFK Petrimex Prievidza	Prievidza	Futbalový štadión Prievidza	6,000
Slovan Bratislava	Bratislava	Tehelné pole	30,085
Spartak Trnava	Trnava	Štadión Antona Malatinského	18,448
Tatran Prešov	Prešov	Tatran Štadión	14,000

== Regular season ==
=== League table ===
Pos	Team	Pld	W	D	L	GF	GA	GD	Pts	Qualification
1	Slovan Bratislava	22	15	6	1	62	16	+46	51	Qualification for championship group
2	1. FC Košice	22	15	1	6	47	25	+22	46	Qualification for championship group
3	Spartak Trnava	22	14	4	4	40	22	+18	46	Qualification for championship group
4	Dukla Banská Bystrica	22	11	5	6	32	24	+8	38	Qualification for championship group
5	Bardejov	22	12	1	9	34	25	+9	37	Qualification for championship group
6	Tatran Prešov	22	10	5	7	28	24	+4	35	Qualification for championship group
7	Chemlon Humenné	22	8	4	10	38	33	+5	28	Qualification for relegation group
8	Lokomotíva Košice	22	9	1	12	26	33	−7	28	Qualification for relegation group
9	Inter Bratislava	22	6	5	11	27	37	−10	23	Qualification for relegation group
10	DAC Dunajská Streda	22	6	3	13	29	56	−27	21	Qualification for relegation group
11	Nitra	22	3	4	15	20	47	−27	13	Qualification for relegation group
12	Petrimex Prievidza	22	2	3	17	13	54	−41	9	Qualification for relegation group

Source: RSSSF.org
Rules for classification: 1) points; 2) goal difference; 3) number of goals scored.

=== Results ===
Home \ Away	BB	BAR	DAC	HUM	INT	NIT	KOŠ	LOK	PRE	PRI	SLO	TRN
Dukla Banská Bystrica		3–0	2–1	1–0	3–0	2–0	3–1	4–0	0–0	2–0	0–0	1–0
Bardejov	3–1		4–0	4–0	2–1	1–0	1–2	3–0	1–0	2–0	1–2	0–0
DAC Dunajská Streda	4–0	2–3		4–0	3–2	2–0	0–2	1–1	1–1	2–0	2–4	0–0
Chemlon Humenné	1–1	3–1	6–0		1–2	2–2	0–1	2–0	4–1	5–0	1–1	1–2
Inter Bratislava	2–2	2–0	3–1	2–3		1–0	1–1	0–3	3–2	2–2	1–3	1–2
Nitra	2–2	3–4	4–0	2–1	0–0		1–3	1–2	2–1	1–1	0–4	0–2
1. FC Košice	1–0	1–0	4–0	2–0	5–1	2–0		2–1	1–2	5–0	2–5	3–0
Lokomotíva Košice	1–0	0–1	3–1	3–2	0–2	4–0	0–3		0–1	2–0	1–0	1–2
Prešov	0–1	2–0	3–0	0–0	1–0	1–0	2–0	2–1		4–0	0–0	1–1
Petrimex Prievidza	1–2	0–3	2–3	1–2	1–0	3–1	0–4	0–2	0–2		0–0	1–2
Slovan Bratislava	5–2	2–0	7–1	3–1	1–1	6–1	3–1	3–0	4–0	5–0		3–0
Spartak Trnava	2–0	1–0	5–1	0–3	1–0	3–0	5–1	3–1	5–2	3–1	1–1	

Source: RSSSF.org
Legend: Blue = home team win; Yellow = draw; Red = away team win.

== Championship group ==
=== League table ===
Pos	Team	Pld	W	D	L	GF	GA	GD	Pts	Qualification
1	Slovan Bratislava (C)	32	22	9	1	79	20	+59	75	Qualification for UEFA Cup preliminary round
2	1. FC Košice	32	21	2	9	62	33	+29	65	Qualification for UEFA Cup preliminary round
3	Spartak Trnava	32	19	6	7	54	32	+22	63	Qualification for Intertoto Cup group stage
4	Dukla Banská Bystrica	32	12	11	9	39	36	+3	47	
5	Tatran Prešov	32	12	7	13	34	36	−2	43	
6	Bardejov	32	13	3	16	38	42	−4	42	

Source: RSSSF.org
Rules for classification: 1) points; 2) goal difference; 3) number of goals scored.
(C) Champions

=== Results ===
Home \ Away	BB	BAR	KOŠ	PRE	SLO	TRN
Dukla Banská Bystrica		1–1	1–3	1–0	0–0	2–2
Bardejov	0–0		0–3	1–0	1–2	0–1
1. FC Košice	3–1	3–1		2–1	0–2	1–0
Prešov	1–1	1–0	1–0		0–0	1–3
Slovan Bratislava	0–0	3–0	1–0	3–1		5–2
Spartak Trnava	3–0	3–0	0–0	1–0	0–1	

Source: RSSSF.org
Legend: Blue = home team win; Yellow = draw; Red = away team win.

== Relegation group ==
=== League table ===
Pos	Team	Pld	W	D	L	GF	GA	GD	Pts	Qualification or relegation
7	Chemlon Humenné	32	13	5	14	50	44	+6	44	Qualification for Cup Winners' Cup qualifying round
8	Lokomotíva Košice	32	13	2	17	37	49	−12	41	
9	Inter Bratislava	32	11	7	14	42	45	−3	40	
10	DAC Dunajská Streda	32	10	3	19	41	76	−35	33	
11	Nitra	32	7	5	20	30	59	−29	26	
12	Petrimex Prievidza (O)	32	7	4	21	31	65	−34	25	Qualification for Relegation playoffs

Source: RSSSF.org
Rules for classification: 1) points; 2) goal difference; 3) number of goals scored.
(O) Play-off winners

=== Results ===
Home \ Away	DAC	HUM	INT	LOK	NIT	PRI
DAC Dunajská Streda		3–1	0–4	0–1	1–2	3–1
Chemlon Humenné	0–1		1–0	2–0	1–0	4–2
Inter Bratislava	3–2	0–0		3–0	1–0	2–1
Lokomotíva Košice	5–1	0–3	1–0		3–0	0–3
Nitra	0–1	2–0	1–1	4–1		1–0
Petrimex Prievidza	3–0	3–0	2–1	0–0	3–0	

Source: RSSSF.org
Legend: Blue = home team win; Yellow = draw; Red = away team win.

== Relegation play-offs ==
The team placed bottom of the relegation group faced the fifth-placed team from the 2. Liga 1995–96 for a place in the league for the next season.

All times are CEST (UTC+2).

=== First leg ===
21 June 1996
17:00

Slovan Poľnohospodár Levice	1–2	Petrimex Prievidza
Újvári 66' (pen.)	Report	Plevka 32'; Kraush 85'

Futbalový štadión Levice, Levice
Attendance: 4,000
Referee: Bohdan Benedik

=== Second leg ===
25 June 1996
17:00

Petrimex Prievidza	5–0	Slovan Poľnohospodár Levice
Plevka 54'; Holmik 62'; L. Kuna 63'; Oršula 67'; Hoksa 81'	Report

Futbalový štadión Prievidza, Prievidza
Attendance: 5,350
Referee: Ľuboš Micheľ

== Season statistics ==
=== Top scorers ===
Rank	Player	Club	Goals
1	(Slovakia) Róbert Semeník	1.FC Kosice	29
2	(Slovakia) Szilárd Németh	Slovan	12
3	(Ukraine) Ruslan Lyubarskyi	Humenne	11
3	(Slovakia) Marek Ujlaky	Trnava	11
5	(Slovakia) Július Šimon	Trnava	10
5	(Brazil) Luís Fábio Gomes	Slovan	10
7	(Slovakia) Jaroslav Timko	Inter	9
7	(Slovakia) Štefan Maixner	Slovan	9
7	(Slovakia) Mikuláš Radványi	Trnava	9
10	(Slovakia) Eugen Bari	DAC D.Streda	8
10	(Slovakia) Dušan Tittel	Slovan	8
10	(Slovakia) Jozef Hrivňák	Bardejov	8
10	(Slovakia) Igor Popovec	Lokomitíva	8
10	(Slovakia) Marek Holmík	Prievidza	8
10	(Slovakia) Ladislav Šimčo	Lokomotíva	8

== See also ==
- 1995–96 Slovak Cup
- 1995–96 2. Liga (Slovakia)
