= 1994–95 Slovak Superliga =

1. Liga
- Season: 1994–95
- Dates: 5 August 1994 – 20 June 1995
- Champions: ŠK Slovan Bratislava
- Relegated: MŠK Žilina
- UEFA Cup: ŠK Slovan Bratislava; 1.FC Košice; Inter Bratislava
- Intertoto Cup: 1.FC Košice
- Matches played: 192
- Goals scored: 548 (2.85 per match)
- Top goalscorer: Róbert Semeník (29 goals)
- Biggest home win: Slovan 7:0 Lokomotíva
- Biggest away win: Prešov 0:3 B.Bystrica; Prievidza 0:3 B.Bystrica; Humenné 0:3 D.Streda; Žilina 0:3 Košice
- Highest scoring: D.Streda 5:4 B.Bystrica
- Average attendance: ▼3,460

The 1994–95 Slovak First Football League was the second season of first-tier football league in Slovakia, since its establishment in 1993. It began on 5 August 1994 and ended on 20 June 1995. Slovan Bratislava were the defending champions.

== Teams ==
12 teams were contested in the league, including 11 sides from the 1993–94 season and one promoted from the 2. Liga.

FC Nitra was relegated to the 1994–95 2. Liga. The one relegated team was replaced by BSC JAS Bardejov.

=== Stadiums and locations ===
Location of teams in 1994–95 1. Liga

Team	Home city	Stadium	Capacity
1. FC Košice	Košice	Všešportový areál	30,312
BSC JAS Bardejov	Bardejov	Mestský štadión Bardejov	3,040
Chemlon Humenné	Humenné	Chemlon Stadion	10,000
Dukla Banská Bystrica	Banská Bystrica	SNP Stadium	10,000
DAC 1904 Dunajská Streda	Dunajská Streda	Mestský štadión - DAC Dunajská Streda	16,410
Inter Slovnaft Bratislava	Bratislava	Štadión Pasienky	12,000
Lokomotíva Košice	Košice	Lokomotíva Stadium	9,000
MFK Petrimex Prievidza	Prievidza	Futbalový štadión Prievidza	6,000
MŠK Žilina	Žilina	Štadión pod Dubňom	11,181
Slovan Bratislava	Bratislava	Tehelné pole	30,085
Spartak Trnava	Trnava	Štadión Antona Malatinského	18,448
Tatran Prešov	Prešov	Tatran Štadión	14,000

== Regular season ==
=== League table ===
Pos	Team	Pld	W	D	L	GF	GA	GD	Pts	Qualification
1	Slovan Bratislava	22	15	6	1	45	16	+29	51	Qualification for championship group
2	1. FC Košice	22	11	5	6	42	28	+14	38	Qualification for championship group
3	Dukla Banská Bystrica	22	10	6	6	38	22	+16	36	Qualification for championship group
4	Spartak Trnava	22	10	5	7	33	23	+10	35	Qualification for championship group
5	DAC Dunajská Streda	22	10	5	7	27	22	+5	35	Qualification for championship group
6	Inter Bratislava	22	8	6	8	28	34	−6	30	Qualification for championship group
7	Lokomotíva Košice	22	9	2	11	34	43	−9	29	Qualification for relegation group
8	Bardejov	22	7	5	10	28	29	−1	26	Qualification for relegation group
9	Tatran Prešov	22	6	7	9	26	34	−8	25	Qualification for relegation group
10	Prievidza	22	7	4	11	20	36	−16	25	Qualification for relegation group
11	Chemlon Humenné	22	5	6	11	22	39	−17	21	Qualification for relegation group
12	Žilina	22	4	3	15	22	39	−17	15	Qualification for relegation group

Source: RSSSF.org
Rules for classification: 1) points; 2) goal difference; 3) number of goals scored.

=== Results ===
Home \ Away	BB	BAR	DAC	HUM	INT	KOŠ	LOK	PRE	PRI	SLO	TRN	ŽIL
Dukla Banská Bystrica		1–1	0–2	2–0	1–1	1–2	0–2	4–0	5–1	2–3	3–1	3–0
Bardejov	0–2		5–2	3–0	1–1	2–1	2–1	2–2	3–1	0–1	1–2	3–1
DAC Dunajská Streda	0–0	1–0		3–1	2–0	1–1	1–0	2–0	1–1	0–0	2–0	1–0
Chemlon Humenné	1–1	2–1	0–3		0–0	2–1	1–0	1–1	1–1	2–3	0–2	2–0
Inter Bratislava	2–2	2–0	2–1	1–0		0–0	3–4	2–0	0–0	2–4	1–3	3–2
1. FC Košice	0–2	3–2	3–2	3–0	4–1		3–1	1–1	3–0	0–1	3–1	2–1
Lokomotíva Košice	1–3	1–1	3–2	2–1	1–3	3–2		4–2	2–1	0–2	1–0	5–3
Prešov	0–3	1–1	3–0	2–1	4–1	2–2	1–0		1–0	1–1	3–1	0–1
Prievidza	0–3	1–0	1–0	2–2	1–2	2–1	3–2	1–0		0–2	1–0	1–0
Slovan Bratislava	0–0	1–0	2–0	2–2	3–0	1–2	6–0	3–1	4–2		0–0	3–1
Spartak Trnava	4–0	0–1	0–0	5–1	1–0	2–2	3–1	2–0	2–0	0–0		3–2
Žilina	1–0	3–0	0–1	1–2	0–1	0–3	1–1	1–1	2–0	1–3	1–1	

Source: EU-Football.info
Legend: Blue = home team win; Yellow = draw; Red = away team win.

== Championship group ==
=== League table ===
Pos	Team	Pld	W	D	L	GF	GA	GD	Pts	Qualification
1	Slovan Bratislava (C)	32	21	9	2	63	25	+38	72	Qualification for UEFA Cup preliminary round
2	1. FC Košice	32	15	7	10	54	42	+12	52	Qualification for UEFA Cup preliminary round and Intertoto Cup group stage
3	Inter Bratislava	32	14	8	10	47	45	+2	50	Qualification for Cup Winners' Cup qualifying round
4	DAC Dunajská Streda	32	13	7	12	41	42	−1	46	
5	Dukla Banská Bystrica	32	12	8	12	53	44	+9	44	
6	Spartak Trnava	32	12	8	12	43	35	+8	44	

Source: RSSSF.org
Rules for classification: 1) points; 2) goal difference; 3) number of goals scored.
(C) Champions

=== Results ===
Home \ Away	BB	DAC	INT	KOŠ	SLO	TRN
Dukla Banská Bystrica		2–2	0–1	2–2	1–2	1–0
DAC Dunajská Streda	5–4		2–1	0–1	1–1	1–0
Inter Bratislava	4–2	2–1		3–0	0–0	2–0
1. FC Košice	4–1	1–0	0–2		0–2	2–2
Slovan Bratislava	2–0	4–2	4–2	1–2		1–0
Spartak Trnava	0–2	4–0	2–2	1–0	1–1	

Source: EU-Football.info
Legend: Blue = home team win; Yellow = draw; Red = away team win.

== Relegation group ==
=== League table ===
Pos	Team	Pld	W	D	L	GF	GA	GD	Pts	Qualification or relegation
7	Bardejov	32	12	7	13	46	46	0	43	
8	Lokomotíva Košice	32	13	3	16	55	60	−5	42	
9	Prievidza	32	12	6	14	35	50	−15	42	
10	Tatran Prešov	32	9	10	13	42	49	−7	37	
11	Chemlon Humenné (O)	32	8	8	16	32	57	−25	32	Qualification for relegation playoffs
12	Žilina (R)	32	9	3	20	37	53	−16	30	Relegation to 2. Liga

Source: RSSSF.org
Rules for classification: 1) points; 2) goal difference; 3) number of goals scored.
(O) Play-off winners; (R) Relegated

=== Results ===
Home \ Away	BAR	HUM	LOK	PRE	PRI	ŽIL
Bardejov		3–0	1–2	2–1	1–0	3–2
Chemlon Humenné	5–2		0–0	1–0	1–3	1–0
Lokomotíva Košice	3–0	3–0		2–3	5–1	1–2
Prešov	2–2	1–1	3–2		1–1	4–0
Prievidza	1–1	3–0	3–2	2–0		1–0
Žilina	0–2	3–1	3–0	2–1	3–0	

Source: EU-Football.info
Legend: Blue = home team win; Yellow = draw; Red = away team win.

== Relegation play-offs ==
The team which finished 11th in the relegation group faced the second-placed team from the 2. Liga 1994–95 for a place in the league for the next season.

All times are CEST (UTC+2).

=== First leg ===
20 June 1995
17:00

Slovan Poľnohospodár Levice	1–2	Chemlon Humenné
Újvári 74' (pen.)	Report	Hajdučko 64'; Lyubarskyi 81'

Futbalový štadión Levice, Levice
Attendance: 9,000
Referee: Vladimír Hriňák

=== Second leg ===
24 June 1995
17:00

Chemlon Humenné	3–0	Slovan Poľnohospodár Levice
Kocurišin 16'; Hajdučko 31'; Prusák 67'	Report

Štadión Humenné, Humenné
Attendance: 6,000
Referee: Karol Ihring

== Season statistics ==
=== Top scorers ===
Rank	Player	Club	Goals
1	(Slovakia) Róbert Semeník	B.Bystrica	18
2	(Slovakia) Štefan Kysela	Lokomotíva	17
3	(Slovakia) Pavol Diňa	1.FC Kosice	13
4	(Slovakia) Michal Pančík	1.FC Kosice	12
5	(Slovakia) Jozef Urblík	Bardejov	11

== See also ==
- 1994–95 Slovak Cup
- 1994–95 2. Liga (Slovakia)
