= 1994–95 2. Liga (Slovakia) =

2. liga
- Season: 1994–95
- Champions: FC Nitra
- Promoted: FC Nitra
- Relegated: FK Slovan Duslo Šaľa; Magnezit ŠM Jelšava; ŠK Slovan Bratislava B; 1. FC Košice B
- Matches played: 240
- Goals scored: 667 (2.78 per match)

The 1994–95 2. Liga (Slovakia) season was the 2nd edition of the Slovak Second Football League (also known as 2. liga) professional football competition. It began in late July 1994 and ended in June 1995.

== League standing ==
Pos	Team	Pld	W	D	L	GF	GA	GD	Pts	Promotion or relegation
1	FC Nitra (C, P)	30	19	5	6	58	29	+29	62	Promotion to Slovak Superliga
2	Slovan Poľnohospodár Levice	30	18	4	8	38	23	+15	58	Qualification for Promotion playoffs
3	Artmedia Petržalka	30	18	3	9	57	26	+31	57	
4	ŠM Gabčíkovo	30	15	5	10	53	38	+15	50	
5	Spartak ZŤS Dubnica n/V	30	13	6	11	40	38	+2	45	
6	Texicom Ružomberok	30	14	2	14	47	33	+14	44	
7	Ozeta Dukla Trenčín	30	13	5	12	54	40	+14	44	
8	Tesla Slovstav Stropkov	30	12	7	11	36	35	+1	43	
9	Slavoj Poľnohospodár Trebišov	30	13	4	13	36	35	+1	43	
10	Matador Púchov	30	13	4	13	42	44	−2	43	
11	ŠKP Bratislava	30	11	8	11	46	41	+5	41	
12	FC Vráble	30	10	10	10	32	37	−5	40	
13	Slovan Duslo Šaľa (R)	30	10	5	15	40	53	−13	35	Relegation to 3. Liga
14	Magnezit ŠM Jelšava (R)	30	9	6	15	35	48	−13	33	Relegation to 3. Liga
15	Slovan Bratislava B (Note: 3 points deducted.) (R)	30	7	2	21	33	76	−43	20	Relegation to 3. Liga
16	1. FC Košice B (R)	30	5	4	21	22	73	−51	19	Relegation to 3. Liga

Source: Új Szó (12 June 1995, page 6)
Rules for classification: 1) points; 2) goal difference; 3) number of goals scored.
(C) Champions; (P) Promoted; (R) Relegated

== See also ==
- 1994–95 Slovak Superliga
