= Michal Pančík =

Michal Pančík may refer to:

- Michal Pančík (footballer born 1971)
- Michal Pančík (footballer born 1982)
