= Juraj Czinege =

Slovak footballer and coach (born 1977)

Personal information
- Date of birth: 29 October 1977 (age 49)
- Place of birth: Bratislava, Czechoslovakia
- Height: 1.76 m (5 ft 9 1/2 in)
- Position: Midfielder

Team information
- Current team: PŠC Pezinok B (coach)

Senior career*
Years	Team	Apps	(Gls)
1995–2002	Inter Bratislava	187	(28)
2003–2005	Elazığspor	67	(8)
2005–2006	1. FC Slovácko	7	(1)
2006–2007	AS Trenčín	31	(9)
2007	Iraklis	8	(0)
2007–2009	FC Artmedia Petržalka	30	(3)
2009–2011	SV Mattersburg	13	(0)
2011	FC ŠTK 1914 Šamorín		
2012–2014	SV Gols	35	(10)

International career
2002	Slovakia	4	(0)

Managerial career
- 2015–2020: FK Karpaty Limbach
- 2020–: PŠC Pezinok B
- * Club domestic league appearances and goals

Juraj Czinege (born 29 October 1977 in Bratislava) is a former Slovak footballer who played as a midfielder. He is currently coaching PŠC Pezinok B.

== Club career ==
Czinege spent two seasons in the Turkish Super Lig with Elazığspor, one season in the Gambrinus Liga with 1. FC Slovácko and one season in the Super League Greece with Iraklis. Then, he played for SV Mattersburg Amateurs in the Austrian Regional League East and FC ŠTK 1914 Šamorín. He ended his career at SV Gols in the Austrian II. Liga Nord.

== International career ==
Czinege made four appearances for the senior Slovakia national football team in 2002. He represented and captained Slovakia at the 2000 Summer Olympics in Australia.

== Style of play ==
Czinege was a known free kick specialist. Mainly a central midfielder, he also played on the right wing.
