= Peter Petrán =

Slovak footballer

Personal information
- Full name: Peter Petrán
- Date of birth: 18 April 1981 (age 45)
- Place of birth: Czechoslovakia
- Height: 1.81 m (5 ft 11 1/2 in)
- Position: Defender

Team information
- Current team: Rimavská Sobota
- Number: 18

Senior career*
Years	Team	Apps	(Gls)
2000–2008	Inter Bratislava	87	(0)
2008–2010	NK Primorje	40	(1)
2010–2011	Senica	4	(0)
2011	Lučenec	10	(0)
2012–2014	Sandecja Nowy Sącz	50	(0)
2014–2015	Rimavská Sobota	?	(?)

Managerial career
- 2022–2024: Rimavská Sobota (assistant)
- 2024-: Rimavská Sobota
- * Club domestic league appearances and goals as of 18 April 2024

Peter Petrán (born 18 April 1981) is a Slovak footballer who plays as a defender for Rimavská Sobota.

He had previously played for many seasons with Inter Bratislava, except between 2008 and 2010 when he was with Primorje. With Primorje, he played the 2008–09 season in the Slovenian First League having played 15 league matches, scoring once, but at the end of that season the club was relegated so he played the 2009–10 season in the Slovenian Second League.
