= Urblík =

Urblík is a surname. Notable people with the surname include:

- Jozef Urblík (born 1996), Slovak footballer
- Jozef Urblík (footballer, born 1970), Slovak footballer
