= Hrivňák =

Hrivňák (and its variants Hrivnák and Hrivnak) is a surname. Notable people with the surname include:

- Gary Hrivnak (born 1951), American football player
- Jim Hrivnak (born 1968), Canadian ice hockey player
- Jozef Hrivňák (born 1973), Slovak football player
- Lucia Hrivnák Klocová (born 1983), Slovak athlete
- Michal Hrivňák (born 1991), Slovak football player
- Pavol Hrivnák (1931–1995), Slovak politician
- Peter Hrivňák (born 1965), Slovak boxer
- Vladimír Hrivnák (1945–2014), Slovak football player
