= 1993–94 2. Liga (Slovakia) =

2. liga
- Season: 1993–94
- Champions: BSC JAS Bardejov
- Promoted: BSC JAS Bardejov
- Relegated: FC STK Senec
- Matches: 240
- Goals: 645 (2.69 per match)

The 1993–94 2. Liga (Slovakia) season was the inaugural edition of the Slovak Second Football League (also known as 2. liga) professional football annual competition. It began in late July 1993 and ended in June 1994.

== League standing ==
Pos	Team	Pld	W	D	L	GF	GA	GD	Pts	Promotion or relegation
1	BSC JAS Bardejov (C, P)	30	17	8	5	50	17	+33	42	Promotion to Slovak Superliga
2	Slovan Poľnohospodár Levice	30	16	7	7	43	30	+13	39	
3	Slavoj Poľnohospodár Trebišov	30	14	7	9	41	31	+10	35	
4	Artmedia Petržalka	30	14	5	11	37	27	+10	33	
5	Tesla Slovstav Stropkov	30	11	10	9	41	38	+3	32	
6	ŠM Gabčíkovo	30	14	4	12	44	44	0	32	
7	Slovan Duslo Šaľa	30	13	6	11	36	37	−1	32	
8	Magnezit ŠM Jelšava	30	10	11	9	41	37	+4	31	
9	ŠKP Bratislava	30	11	8	11	47	42	+5	30	
10	FC Vráble	30	9	11	10	41	42	−1	29	
11	Texicom Ružomberok	30	12	5	13	48	53	−5	29	
12	Slovan Bratislava B	30	9	9	12	44	47	−3	27	
13	ŠK Matador Púchov	30	11	4	15	36	52	−16	26	
14	Spartak ZŤS Dubnica n/V	30	7	11	12	35	47	−12	25	
15	1. FC Košice B	30	9	6	15	38	41	−3	24	
16	STK Senec (Note: 2 points deducted.) (R)	30	6	2	22	23	60	−37	12	Relegation to 3. Liga

Source: Új Szó (20 June 1994, page 7)
Rules for classification: 1) points; 2) goal difference; 3) number of goals scored.
(C) Champions; (P) Promoted; (R) Relegated

== See also ==
- 1993–94 Slovak Superliga
