= Jozef Bubenko =

Slovak football coach

Personal information
- Full name: Jozef Bubenko
- Date of birth: 21 March 1951 (age 75)
- Place of birth: Prešov, Czechoslovakia
- Position: Striker

Youth career
- TJ Slovan Solivar
- Tatran Prešov

Senior career*
Years	Team	Apps	(Gls)
1969–1979	Tatran Prešov		
1979–1981	Dukla Banská Bystrica		(6)
1981–1984	Tatran Prešov	71	(15)
1984–1985	Partizán Bardejov		
Total		293	(67)

International career
1971–1972	Czechoslovakia U23	2	(0)

Managerial career
- 1984–1985: Partizán Bardejov (assistant)
- 1985–1988: Slovan Giraltovce
- 1988–1992: Tatran Prešov (assistant)
- 1992–1996: JAS Bardejov
- 1996–2002: Inter Bratislava
- 2002–2004: Panionios
- 2004–2005: Slovakia U21
- 2005–2006: Panionios
- 2006: Spartak Trnava
- 2006–2007: Iraklis
- 2008: Olympiacos Volos
- 2010: Iraklis
- 2011: Mika
- 2013: Tatran Prešov
- 2013: Zemplín Michalovce
- * Club domestic league appearances and goals

Jozef Bubenko (born 21 March 1951) is a Slovak football coach who last managed for Zemplín Michalovce.

He played for Tatran Prešov and Dukla Banská Bystrica.

He coached teams Tatran Prešov (1988–92), JAS BArdejov (1992–96), Inter Bratislava (1996–02), Panionios (2002–04 and 2005–06), Slovakia national under-21 football team (2004–05), Spartak Trnava (2006), Iraklis (2007 and since 2010). On 7 August 2010 Bubenko decided to step down as coach of Iraklis.

== Honours ==
=== Player ===
Tatran Prešov

- Slovak Cup (1): 1981

=== Manager ===
Bardejov

- 2. Liga Winner: 1993–94 (Promoted)

Inter Bratislava

- Slovak Super Liga (2): 1999–2000, 2000–01
- Slovak Cup (2): 1999–00, 2000–01
