= 1995–96 2. Liga (Slovakia) =

2. liga
- Season: 1995–96
- Champions: FK Artmedia Petržalka
- Promoted: FK Artmedia Petržalka; MŠK Žilina; FC Tauris Rimavská Sobota; Spartak ZŤS Dubnica n/V
- Relegated: Kalcit Rožňava
- Matches played: 240
- Goals scored: 633 (2.64 per match)

The 1995–96 2. Liga (Slovakia) season was the 3rd edition of the Slovak Second Football League (also known as 2. liga) professional football competition. It began in late July 1995 and ended in June 1996.

== League standing ==
Pos	Team	Pld	W	D	L	GF	GA	GD	Pts	Promotion or qualification
1	Artmedia Petržalka (C, P)	30	19	6	5	54	29	+25	63	Promotion to Slovak Superliga
2	MŠK Žilina (P)	30	17	5	8	57	27	+30	56	Promotion to Slovak Superliga
3	Tauris Rimavská Sobota (P)	30	15	9	6	41	17	+24	54	Promotion to Slovak Superliga
4	Spartak ZŤS Dubnica n/V (P)	30	13	10	7	48	35	+13	49	Promotion to Slovak Superliga
5	Slovan Poľnohospodár Levice	30	15	3	12	41	42	−1	48	Qualification for Promotion playoffs
6	MŠK Ružomberok	30	14	5	11	54	44	+10	47	
7	Matador Púchov	30	12	9	9	44	27	+17	45	
8	Tatran Devín	30	11	6	13	38	48	−10	39	
9	Ozeta Dukla Trenčín	30	10	7	13	41	42	−1	37	
10	Tesla Slovstav Stropkov	30	10	7	13	33	37	−4	37	
11	FC Vráble	30	10	5	15	32	56	−24	35	
12	PFK Piešťany	30	10	4	16	36	47	−11	34	
13	ŠM Gabčíkovo	30	8	9	13	36	42	−6	33	
14	Slavoj Poľnohospodár Trebišov	30	10	3	17	25	31	−6	33	
15	Kalcit Rožňava (R)	30	8	8	14	23	56	−33	32	Qualification for Relegation playoffs
16	ŠKP Bratislava (O)	30	7	6	17	30	53	−23	27	Qualification for Relegation playoffs

Source: RSSSF.org
Rules for classification: 1) points; 2) goal difference; 3) number of goals scored.
(C) Champions; (O) Play-off winners; (P) Promoted; (R) Relegated

=== Relegation play-offs ===
Team 1	Agg.	Team 2	1st leg	2nd leg
Kalcit Rožňava	1–5	Bukóza Vranov nad Topľou	1–2	0–3
ŠKP Bratislava	5–0	Iskra Matador Bratislava	3–0	2–0

== See also ==
- 1995–96 Slovak Superliga
