= Martin Urban =

Slovak footballer (born 1972)

Personal information
- Date of birth: 24 April 1972 (age 54)
- Place of birth: Czechoslovakia
- Position: Defender

Senior career*
Years	Team	Apps	(Gls)
1995–1998	Lokomotíva Košice	82	(5)
1998–2000	Tatran Prešov	41	(2)
2000	Ružomberok	12	(2)
2001–2003	PAS Giannina	9	(0)
2003–2005	Enosis Neon Paralimni	26	(8)
2005	Rimavská Sobota	13	(1)
- * Club domestic league appearances and goals

Martin Urban (born 24 April 1972) is a Slovak former professional footballer who played as a defender in Slovakia, Greece and Cyprus.

== Career ==
Urban began his career with Lokomotíva Košice, Tatran Prešov and Ružomberok before joining Greek side PAS Giannina in January 2000. He appeared in nine Alpha Ethniki matches for PAS Giannina. Next, he moved to Cyprus where he played for Enosis Neon Paralimni. In January 2005, Urban returned to Slovakia to play for Slovak First Football League side Rimavská Sobota.
