= Marián Ľalík =

Slovak footballer

Personal information
- Date of birth: 7 February 1972 (age 54)
- Place of birth: Czechoslovakia
- Height: 1.82 m (5 ft 11 1/2 in)
- Position: Midfielder

Youth career
- BSC Bardejov

Senior career*
Years	Team	Apps	(Gls)
1990–1991	Inter Bratislava	15	(0)
1991–1992	Banská Bystrica	10	(1)
1994–1996	Bardejov		
1996	Košice		
1996–1997	Lokomotíva Košice	4	(0)
1997–1998	Bardejov	19	(5)
1997–1998	Sparta Prague	1	(0)
1998–1999	Bardejov	9	(4)
1999–2002	Inter Bratislava	70	(9)
2002–2003	Panionios	31	(2)
2003–2004	Adanaspor	45	(4)
2004–2005	Aris Limassol	19	(1)
2005–2006	Niki Volos		
- * Club domestic league appearances and goals as of 13 July 2012

Marián Ľalík (born 7 February 1972) is a Slovak retired football midfielder who played professionally in Slovakia, Czech Republic, Greece, Turkey and Cyprus.

== Playing career ==
=== Club career ===
Ľalík began his playing career in Slovakia. He moved to Sparta Prague, but would only play in one Gambrinus liga match for the club. He returned to Slovakia where he enjoyed success with AŠK Inter Bratislava, scoring nine goals and winning the Slovak Superliga and Slovak Cup double during the 1999–00 season.

Ľalík moved abroad again when he signed a one-year contract with Greek Super League club Panionios in January 2002. He played in 31 league matches for Panionios before leaving during the 2002–03 season winter break. He joined Adanaspor in January 2003, and played in 45 Super Lig matches during his 1.5 year spell with the club.
