= Milan Strelec =

Slovak footballer

Personal information
- Full name: Milan Strelec
- Date of birth: 30 November 1972 (age 53)
- Place of birth: Bratislava, Czechoslovakia
- Position: Forward

Senior career*
Years	Team	Apps	(Gls)
1993	Slovan Bratislava	2	(0)
1994–1995	Artmedia Petržalka	88	(13)
1996	Dunajská Streda		
2001–2002	Fortuna Düsseldorf	5	(0)
2003–2005	Public Bank		
–2007	ASV Zurndorf		
2007–2009	FK Slovan Most pri Bratislave		
2009–2010	Veľký Meder		
2010–2011	LP Domino		
2011–	ŠK Tomášov		
2012–2014	→ ŠK Krasňany (loan)		
2014	→ Petržalka (loan)		
- * Club domestic league appearances and goals as of 27 August 2014

Milan Strelec (born 30 November 1972) is a Slovak former footballer who played as a striker.

== Club career ==
He played for ŠK Slovan Bratislava in the Czechoslovak League, playing in 2 league matches. He later played for Artmedia Bratislava, featuring in 90 league matches and scoring 13 goals.

== Personal life ==
His son, named David Strelec, is also footballer. He represents Slovakia at international level and plays for Middlesbrough FC.
