= Jozef Bomba =

Slovak footballer

Personal information
- Full name: Jozef Bomba
- Date of birth: 30 March 1939
- Place of birth: Bardejov, Slovak Republic
- Date of death: 27 October 2005 (aged 66)
- Place of death: Košice, Slovakia
- Positions: Centre back; right back

Youth career
- Slavoj Bardejov

Senior career*
Years	Team	Apps	(Gls)
1957–1959	Tatran Prešov	11	(0)
1959–1961	RH Brno	39	(2)
1961–1966	Tatran Prešov	119	(5)
1967–1972	VSS Košice	113	(1)
Total		282	(8)

International career
1960–1970	Czechoslovakia	13	(0)
Medal record
Men's football
Representing Czechoslovakia
FIFA World Cup
Runner-up	1962 Chile
- * Club domestic league appearances and goals

Jozef Bomba (30 March 1939 – 27 October 2005) was a Slovak football defender. He impressed as a fast sprinter and excellent athletic footballer. During his career he played 279 matches and scored 8 goals in the Czechoslovak First League. Internationally he played for Czechoslovakia, making 13 appearances without scoring between 1960 and 1970.

== Career ==
On 1 May 1960, Bomba made his international debut for Czechoslovakia against Austria, playing at right back in the 4–0 home win in Prague. He was part of the Czechoslovakia squad at the 1962 FIFA World Cup that finished as runners-up but he did not play in any match.
