= Jozef Urblík (footballer, born 1970) =

Slovak footballer

Personal information
- Date of birth: 3 January 1970 (age 56)
- Position: Forward

Senior career*
Years	Team	Apps	(Gls)
–1994	Slovan Duslo Šaľa		
1994	JAS Bardejov		
1995–1996	Košice		
1996–1997	JAS Bardejov		
1997	Hradec Králové		
1997–1998	Rimavská Sobota		
1998–2001	Prievidza		
2000	→ Hapoel Be'er Sheva (loan)		
- * Club domestic league appearances and goals

Jozef Urblík (born 3 January 1970) is a retired Slovak football striker.
