= Vladimír Goffa =

Slovak football manager (born 1959)

Personal information
- Date of birth: 1 December 1959 (age 66)
- Place of birth: Vranov nad Topľou, Czechoslovakia
- Position: Midfielder

Senior career*
Years	Team	Apps	(Gls)
- Žilina
- Banská Bystrica
- Martin
- Neusiedli am See

Managerial career
- –2001: ŠKP Devín
- 2000–2001: Slovakia U-21 (assistant)
- Dubnica
- Prievidza
- Rimavská Sobota
- 2003: Žilina (Assistant)
- 2004: FK Kysucký Lieskovec
- 2004: Slovan Bratislava
- 2005–2006: Hurriyya SC
- 2006–2008: New Radiant
- 2008: Žilina (Assistant)
- 2008–2009: Dolný Kubín
- 2010–2011: Petržalka
- 2011–2012: Moldava
- 2013–2014: Liptovský Mikuláš
- 2014: Duslo Šaľa
- 2014: Frýdek-Místek
- 2016: Rimavská Sobota
- 2016: Podbeskidzie (assistant)
- 2018: Frýdek-Místek (assistant)
- * Club domestic league appearances and goals

Vladimír Goffa (born 1 December 1959) is a Slovak football manager and former player who is assistant manager of Podbeskidzie. He has coached FK Bodva Moldava nad Bodvou, Baník Prievidza, Slovan Bratislava and other Slovak football teams. Goffa won two titles with the Maldivian football club New Radiant SC.

In March 2021, Goffa was seriously affected by COVID-19, and had to be hospitalised.

== Honours ==
=== Manager ===
Hurriyya SC

- Dhivehi League: 2005

New Radiant

- Dhivehi League: 2006
