= Tomáš Medveď =

Slovak footballer

Personal information
- Date of birth: 31 December 1973 (age 52)
- Place of birth: Košice, Czechoslovakia
- Height: 1.85 m (6 ft 1 in)
- Position: Forward

Youth career
- 1. FC Košice

Senior career*
| Years | Team | Apps | (Gls) |
| 1993 | Dukla Banská Bystrica | | |
| 1994–1995 | Inter Bratislava | | (21) |
| 1996 | 1. FC Košice | | (1) |
| 1996 | Svit Zlín | | |
| 1997 | Chemlon Humenné | | (8) |
| 1997 | Lokomotíva Košice | | (2) |
| 1997–1998 | Slovan Bratislava | | (8) |
| 1998–2000 | Artmedia Petržalka | | |
| 2000–2001 | SSV Ulm | 23 | (1) |
| 2001–2003 | Artmedia Petržalka | | (31) |
| 2003–2004 | Videoton | 25 | (7) |
| 2004–2005 | Pápa | 28 | (18) |
| 2005 | Shenyang Ginde | 12 | (4) |
| 2006–2007 | Dukla Banská Bystrica | | |
| 2008 | FC Senec | | (2) |
| 2014–2015 | FC Petržalka akadémia | | |

Managerial career
- 2012–2013: FK Rača
- 2013–2015: FC Petržalka akadémia
- * Club domestic league appearances and goals

Tomáš Medveď (born 31 December 1973) is a Slovak former professional footballer who played as a forward.

== Honours ==
Individual

- Slovak Elite club league top scorers (Slovak: Klub ligových kanonierov) with 103 goals.
- Nemzeti Bajnokság I top scorer: 2004-05
