= Tibor Szaban =

Slovak footballer and coach

Personal information
- Date of birth: 21 July 1963 (age 63)
- Place of birth: Rožňava, Czechoslovakia
- Position: Defender

Senior career*
Years	Team	Apps	(Gls)
1982–1987	Lokomotíva Košice		
1987–1991	DAC Dunajská Streda		
1992–1995	Kedah FA		
1996–1997	Tiong Bahru United		
1998–1999	ASV Siegendorf		
1999–2001	DAC Dunajská Streda		

Managerial career
- 2002: DAC Dunajská Streda
- 2003: TJ OFC Gabčíkovo
- * Club domestic league appearances and goals

Tibor Szaban (born 21 July 1963) is a Slovak former football player and coach. His preferred playing position is as a defender.
