= Miroslav Drobňák =

Slovak footballer

Personal information
- Full name: Miroslav Drobňák
- Date of birth: 29 May 1977 (age 49)
- Place of birth: Šarišské Michaľany, Czechoslovakia
- Height: 1.82 m (5 ft 11 1/2 in)
- Position: Midfielder

Youth career
- Tatran Prešov

Senior career*
Years	Team	Apps	(Gls)
1994–2000	Tatran Prešov	99	(7)
2000–2003	Inter Bratislava	81	(20)
2003	Skoda Xanthi	1	(0)
2004	Dyskobolia Grodzisk	5	(2)
2004–2005	Tatran Prešov	11	(1)
2005–2006	MFK Košice	27	(3)
2006–2015	Lipany		

International career
1997–2000	Slovakia U21		
2003	Slovakia	1	(0)
- * Club domestic league appearances and goals

Miroslav Drobňák (born 29 May 1977) is a Slovak former professional footballer who played as a midfielder.

== Honours ==
Inter Bratislava

- Slovak First Football League: 2000–01
- Slovak Cup: 2000–01
