= Peter Babnič =

Slovak footballer

Personal information
- Date of birth: 30 April 1977 (age 49)
- Place of birth: Brezno, Czechoslovakia
- Height: 1.74 m (5 ft 9 in)
- Position: Forard

Youth career
- 1990–1994: MŠK Brezno

Senior career*
Years	Team	Apps	(Gls)
1994–1995	MŠK Brezno		
1995–1997	Banská Bystrica	56	(7)
1997–2001	Inter Bratislava	103	(30)
2001–2003	Sparta Prague	7	(0)
2003	Tescoma Zlín	14	(5)
2003–2006	Sigma Olomouc	76	(15)
2006–2007	Ružomberok	24	(0)
2007–2008	Dyskobolia Grodzisk	10	(1)
2008	Senec	1	(0)
2008–2009	Baník Ružiná		
2009–2011	SV Haitzendorf	54	(20)
2011–2012	Turany		
2012–2013	Tatran Oravské Veselé		

International career
1998–2000	Slovakia U21	10	(5)
2000–2004	Slovakia	12	(1)
- * Club domestic league appearances and goals

Peter Babnič (born 30 April 1977) is a Slovak former professional footballer who played as a forard.

Babnič played for several clubs in Slovakia before moving to the Czech Republic to join Sparta Prague in 2001. He also played for Tescoma Zlín and Sigma Olomouc before returning to Slovakia in 2006. He won the Slovak championship with Inter Bratislava in the 2000 and 2001 seasons.

== International career ==
Score and result list Slovakia's goal tally first.

#	Date	Venue	Opponent	Score	Result	Competition
1.	9 July 2004	Hiroshima Big Arch, Hiroshima, Japan	Japan	1–1	1–3	2004 Kirin Cup
