= Dmitri Kraush =

Russian footballer

Personal information
- Date of birth: 18 June 1969 (age 57)
- Height: 1.77 m (5 ft 10 in)
- Positions: Midfielder; forward

Senior career*
| Years | Team | Apps | (Gls) |
| 1986–1987 | Torpedo Moscow | 0 | (0) |
| 1988–1989 | EShVSM Moscow | 46 | (4) |
| 1990 | Shinnik Yaroslavl | 1 | (0) |
| 1990–1992 | Asmaral Moscow | 28 | (2) |
| 1992 | Presnya Moscow | 11 | (0) |
| 1992 | Asmaral Kislovodsk | 15 | (4) |
| 1993–1998 | Baník Prievidza | 124 | (14) |
| 1998–2003 | Matador Púchov | 49 | (4) |
- * Club domestic league appearances and goals

Dmitri Yurevich Kraush (Russian: Дмитрий Юрьевич Крауш; born 18 June 1969) is a retired Russian professional footballer.

Kraush played in the Russian Top League with Asmaral Moscow.
