= FC Petržalka =

Slovak football club

- Full name: FC Petržalka
- Nickname: Engerau
- Founded: 7 June 1898; 128 years ago as Pozsonyi Torna Egyesület
- Ground: Stadium FC Petržalka 1898, Petržalka, Slovakia
- Capacity: 1,600
- Owner(s): Marek Mojto 33% Marek Trajter 33% Marián Fridrich 33%
- President: Marek Mojto
- Head coach: Rastislav Urgela
- League: MONACObet Liga
- 2025–26: 4th of 16
- Website: www.fcpetrzalka.sk
Home colours	Away colours

FC Petržalka is a Slovak football club based in Bratislava. The club was founded in 1898 and it was promoted twice to the top flight 1. liga in the Czechoslovakia during the 1980s (for the 1981–82 season and 1984–85 season) and spent another 14 consecutive seasons in the Slovak first league from 1996–97 to 2009–10. The biggest international success of Petržalka was participation in the group stage of the 2005–06 UEFA Champions League and Round of 32 of the 2005–06 UEFA Cup. Several years later, after losing its owner, a different company took over the piece of land under the club's old home ground Štadión Petržalka for commercial building and the stadium was demolished.

The football club founded in 1898, from the previous sport club Pozsonyi Torna Egyesület which was grounded in 1880, initially played in the regional Hungarian league. The club has been known by 17 names in its history, including Artmedia Bratislava (after their advertising agency sponsors). Artmedia played in the top flight Slovak league from its inception in 1993 until 2010. The club achieved its biggest success in the mid-2000s (decade), while playing under the coach Vladimír Weiss. The club won the Corgoň Liga title in 2005 and later qualified for the group stage of the Champions League, where it achieved the biggest success of all the Slovak clubs. Later, in 2008 the club won the double, but during the next season most of the squad left the club.

The club plays its home matches at its own new stadium with a capacity of 1600. The team wears white and black striped shirts.

In 2025, the club expressed interest in building a new stadium.

== History ==
- 1898 – Founded as Pozsonyi Torna Egyesület
- 1939 – Renamed Engerau Pressburg
- 1945 – Renamed ŠK Petržalka
- 1949 – Renamed Kovosmalt Petržalka
- 1953 – Renamed Spartak Kovosmalt Bratislava
- 1963 – Renamed TJ Považské Strojárne Bratislava
- 1965 – Renamed SKS Petržalka
- 1976 – Renamed TJ ZŤS Petržalka
- 1986 – Merged with TJ Internacionál Slovnaft Bratislava to form TJ Internacionál Slovnaft ZŤS Bratislava, but split again in 1990.
- 1990 – Renamed 1. FC Hydronika Petržalka
- 1991 – Renamed 1. FC Petržalka
- 1993 – Renamed FK Artmedia Petržalka
- 2004 – Renamed FC Artmedia Bratislava
- 2007 – Renamed FC Artmedia Petržalka
- 2009 – Renamed MFK Petržalka
- 2010 – Renamed FC Petržalka 1898
- 2014 – Bankruptcy - renamed FC Petržalka akadémia
- 2017 – Renamed FC Petržalka

=== 2005–06: European campaign ===
They reached the group stage of the UEFA Champions League in 2005–06 after wins over Kairat Almaty, Celtic and Partizan Belgrade. They beat Almaty 4–3 on aggregate in the 1st qualifying round despite a 2–0 defeat in the first leg since they won second leg by 4–1. However it was on 27 July 2005, they made their mark on the tournament, as they beat 2003 UEFA Cup finalists and 1967 European Cup winners Celtic 5–0 in the first leg of their Champions League 2nd qualifying round match. The Celtic side couldn't recover, only managing to win the return leg 4–0, and Artmedia held on to progress in the tournament. On 23 August 2005 they clinched a place in the group stage after overcoming Serbian club Partizan Belgrade 4–3 on penalties after a 0–0 aggregate scoreline thus becoming the second Slovak club after 1. FC Košice in 1997–98 to reach the coveted Champions League proper. Their success was even more remarkable considering Artmedia's entire annual budget is just over £1m.

Artmedia also made history by becoming one of the first two clubs ever to advance from the first qualifying round into the Champions League group stage. The other club to do so was 2004–05 winners Liverpool, who were given a special entry into the first qualifying round of the 2005–06 event, and joined Artmedia in the group stage.

Artmedia played their Champions League fixtures at the Tehelné pole ground of crosstown rivals Slovan Bratislava because their own ground does not meet UEFA standards for Champions League play.

On 28 September 2005, Artmedia made history once again by becoming the first Slovak side to collect a point in the Champions League group stage (in the eighth attempt by a Slovak side to do so). In another famous upset, they came back from a 2–0 first-half deficit to defeat 2004 Champions League winners Porto 3–2 at Porto's home ground.

Eventually, they finished third in the group, parachuting them into the UEFA Cup, but not before missing a late chance to score a goal in the return fixture against Porto that would have sent them to the round of 16 at Rangers' expense.

In December 2005 the goalkeeper Juraj Čobej underwent a complicated brain surgery attempting to remove a malign tumor. Fortunately, he has fully recovered and has already stood a firm ground in goal during the first rounds of the 2006–07 season.

Artmedia lost the home leg of their UEFA Cup round of 32 tie with Levski Sofia 1–0 and were knocked out of the tournament after an away defeat of 2–0.

After the successful season the coach Vladimír Weiss left to join FC Saturn Ramenskoe. Several players left the club, among others Ján Ďurica to FC Saturn Ramenskoe, Balázs Borbély to 1. FC Kaiserslautern and Blažej Vaščák to Treviso FBC.

=== 2008–2014: Decline of Petržalka ===
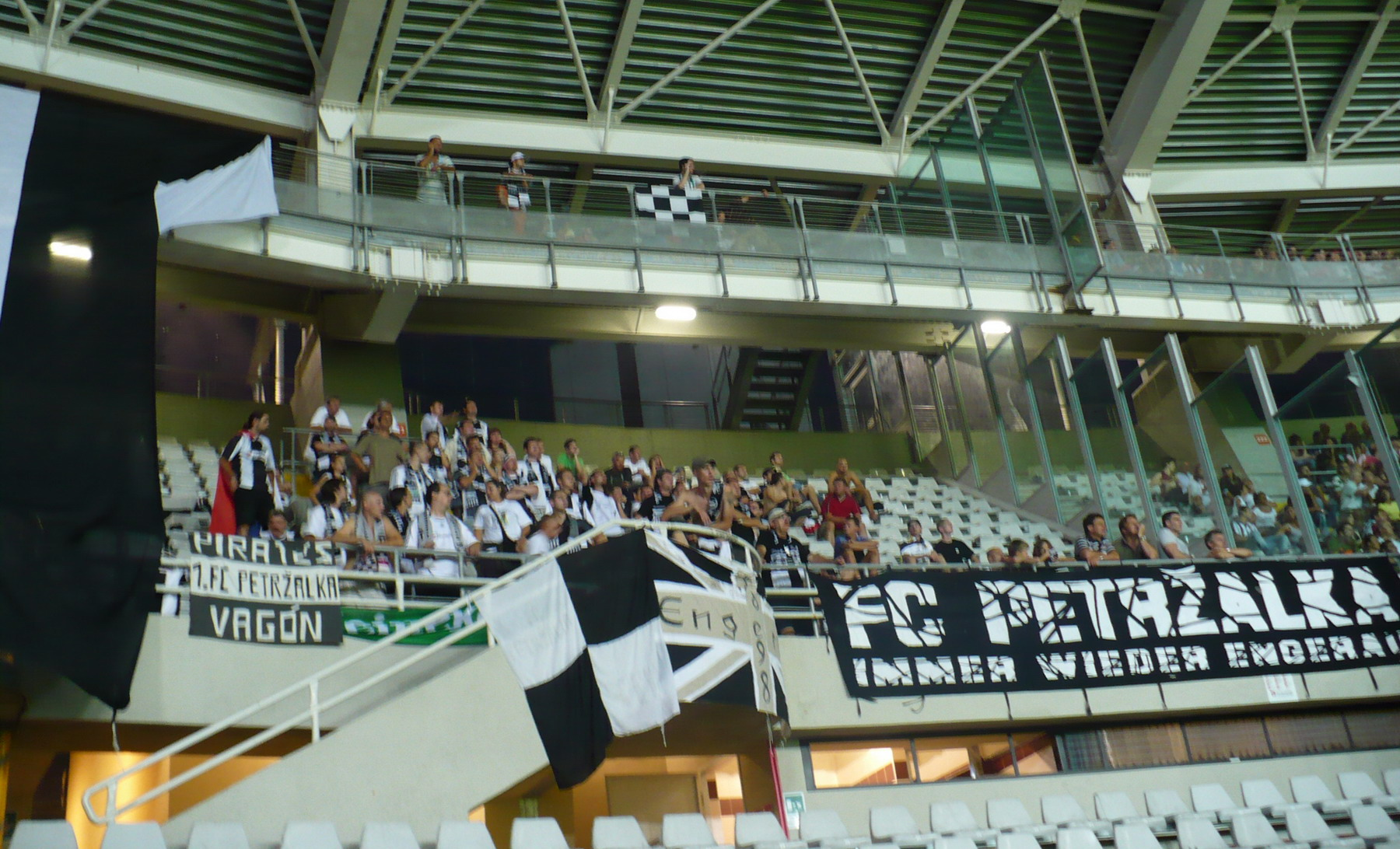
MFK Petržalka fans in Turin

The club reassigned Vladimír Weiss as head coach for the 2007–08 season. Some of the players came back, the club's captain Ján Kozák returned from a loan at WBA, Aleš Urbánek, Branislav Fodrek and Branislav Obžera returned, and the new faces in the club, among others, included Czech fullback Radek Dosoudil, Brazilian midfielder Cléber and Czech striker Zbyněk Pospěch.

The club went on to win the title in the Slovak league for the second time, beating rivals MŠK Žilina in the important matches and in the final table as well. Before the new season the club owner Ivan Kmotrík and the main sponsor left the club, which left later impact on the team. During the 2008–09 UEFA Champions League qualification round Artmedia won over Valletta F.C. and Tampere United, but lost to Juventus, with which the club suffered 0–4 loss in the first leg and later only drew 1–1. During the next stages several players left the club (4 of them to local rivals ŠK Slovan Bratislava).

Prior to the 2009–10 season a huge number of players left the club, most of them were replaced by youngsters and players from the Inter Bratislava.

After a decent first half of the season, where MFK Petrzalka played in the region of sixth place, the team fell apart in the second half of the season, and eventually the club were relegated at the end of the season.

=== 2014–present: New era ===
During the summer of 2014 was in Petržalka found the successor of the traditional club – team FC Petržalka akadémia. This club applied for the 5th division (5. liga) and in its premiere season 2014–15 has won the competition. Due to the reorganisation of divisions in Slovak football did't get the promotion at that year. Season 2015–16 Petržalka started 5th division horrible – in 6 games they suffered 4 losses got only 6 points. But after noticeable serie without loss they won the 5. liga again and promoted to the 4th one. In 2016–17 Petržalka started the competition in the 4. liga similar way as it finished the previous one. Petržalka suffered the first and only loss of the season in its 27th match which means that Petržlaka was unbeatable for 46 consecutive competitive league matches from loss at FA Bratislava (2–3) until loss at Veľké Leváre (0–1) in the 27th round of 2016–17. After 25 wins in 30 matches Petržalka won the 4. liga and promoted to the 3rd division for 2017–18 season. Since the beginning of the 3rd division 2017–18 was Petržalka among the candidates for promotion to the 2nd division. After unbeaten autumn part of the season was Petržalka on the 2nd place during winter break behind Rohožník with the same point level. Decisive match came in the beginning of the spring part of the season. Petržalka beat Rohožník at home 3–0 and got the advantage in the table. In addition, Petržalka has won 15 out of last 16 games in the 3rd division (they lost only at field of reserve team of city rivals Slovan U21 0–1 in the game, which had Slovan U21 in the line-up 5 players from the first team including former national players Róbert Vittek and Kornel Saláta) and in the 29th round clinched promotion after win in Most 5–0 and return to 2nd division after 2209 days. On 20 July 2018 played Petržalka its 1st match in the 2nd division after 6 years and in the first game after promotion reached its 1st win.

== Honours ==
=== Domestic ===
Czechoslovakia

- 1.SNL (1st Slovak National football league) (1969–1993)
  - Winners (2): 1980–81, 1983–84

Slovakia

- Slovak Superliga (1993–)
  - Winners (2): 2004–05, 2007–08
  - Runners-up (3): 2002–03, 2005–06, 2006–07
- Slovenský Pohár (Slovak Cup) (1961–)
  - Winners (2): 2004, 2008
  - Runners-Up (3):1982, 2005, 2009
- Pribina Cup (Slovak Super Cup) (1993–)
  - Winners (2): 2005, 2008

=== European ===
- UEFA Champions League
  - Group stage (1): 2005–06
- UEFA Europa League
  - Round of 32 (1): 2005–06

==== Slovak League Top Goalscorer ====
Slovak League Top scorer since 1993–94

Year	Winner	G
2004–05	(Slovakia) Filip Šebo	22
2006–07	(Slovakia) Tomáš Oravec	16

^{1}Shared award

== Results ==
=== League and domestic cup history ===
Slovak League only (1993–present)

Season	Division (Name)	Pos./Teams	Pl.	W	D	L	GS	GA	P	Slovak Cup	Europe		Top scorer (Goals)
1977-78	Divíza: Skupina E	2/16	30	16	5	9	52	33	37				
1978-79	skupina Slovensko - západ	1/12	22	18	1	3	44	11	37	Quarter-finals			
1979-80	2nd (I. SNL)	5/16	30	10	11	9	37	32	31	Semi-finals			
1980-81	2nd (I. SNL)	1/16	30	19	3	8	57	27	41	Semi-finals			
1981-82	I. Liga	15/16	30	8	6	16	26	43	22	Runners-up			
1982-83	2nd (I. SNL)	6/16	30	13	4	13	51	47	30	Quarter-finals			
1983-84	2nd (I. SNL)	1/16	30	24	3	3	80	19	49	Quarter-finals			
1984-85	I. Liga	15/16	30	6	9	15	29	47	21				
1985-86	2nd (I. SNL)	4/16	30	17	8	5	47	37	32				
1986-87	2nd (I. SNL)	1/16	30	19	7	4	68	23	45	Quarter-finals			Together with FK Inter Bratislava
1987-88	I. Liga	13/16	30	11	5	14	50	54	27	Quarter-finals			Together with FK Inter Bratislava
1988-89	I. Liga	9/16	30	11	7	12	53	56	29	Semi-finals			Together with FK Inter Bratislava
1989-90	I. Liga	3/16	30	16	5	9	55	30	37	Winner			Together with FK Inter Bratislava
1990-91	Did not play												
1991-92	2nd (I. SNL)	10/16	30	9	9	12	32	45	27				
1992-93	2nd (I. SNL)	10/16	30	7	12	11	28	41	26				
Season	Division (Name)	Pos./Teams	Pl.	W	D	L	GS	GA	P	Slovak Cup	Europe		Top scorer (Goals)
1993–94	2nd (1.Liga)	4/(16)	30	14	5	11	37	27	33	2.R			(Slovakia) Jakubec (12)
1994–95	2nd (1.Liga)	3/(12)	30	18	3	9	57	26	57	Quarter-finals			(Slovakia) Milan Strelec (16)
1995–96	2nd (1.Liga)	1/(16)	30	19	6	5	54	29	63	1.R			(Slovakia) Milan Strelec (16)
1996–97	1st (Mars Superliga)	13/(16)	30	9	8	13	29	49	35	Quarter-finals			(Slovakia) Radovan Vašík (4) (Slovakia) Pavol Gostič (4)
1997–98	1st (Mars Superliga)	8/(16)	30	11	6	13	27	28	39	1.R			(Slovakia) Milan Strelec (4)
1998–99	1st (Mars Superliga)	9/(16)	30	11	6	13	37	42	39	1.R			(Slovakia) Milan Strelec (6) (Slovakia) Tomáš Medveď (6)
1999–00	1st (Mars Superliga)	9/(16)	30	11	6	13	43	48	39	Quarter-finals			(Slovakia) Tomáš Medveď (14)
2000–01	1st (Mars Superliga)	4/(10)	36	15	9	12	59	55	54	Quarter-finals	UI	2.R ( (Slovenia) Publikum)	(Slovakia) Henrich Benčík (8)
2001–02	1st (Mars Superliga)	7/(10)	36	11	14	11	51	45	47	1.R			(Slovakia) Henrich Benčík (12)
2002–03	1st (1. liga)	2/(10)	36	20	7	9	49	32	67	1.R			(Slovakia) Ladislav Suchánek (7)
2003–04	1st (Corgoň Liga)	8/(10)	36	10	14	12	43	44	44	Winner	UC	1.R ( (France) Bordeaux)	(Slovakia) Marek Krejčí (15)
2004–05	1st (Corgoň Liga)	1/(10)	36	20	12	4	64	28	72	Runners-Up	UC	Q2 ( (Ukraine) Dnipro)	(Slovakia) Filip Šebo (22)
2005–06	1st (Corgoň Liga)	2/(10)	36	23	5	8	58	33	74	Semi-finals	CL; UC	Group stage (H), 3rd R32 ( (Bulgaria) Levski)	(Slovakia) Branislav Fodrek (8) (Czech Republic) Lukáš Hartig (8)
2006–07	1st (Corgoň Liga)	2/(16)	28	17	5	6	56	38	56	Semi-finals	UC	1.R ( (Spain) Espanyol)	(Slovakia) Tomáš Oravec (16)
2007–08	1st (Corgoň Liga)	1/(12)	33	27	3	3	77	30	84	Winners	UC	1.R ( (Greece) Panathinaikos)	(Slovakia) Juraj Halenár (16)
2008–09	1st (Corgoň Liga)	6/(12)	33	12	11	10	50	38	47	Runners-Up	CL; UC	Q3 ( (Italy) Juventus); 1.R ( (Portugal) S.C. Braga)	(Slovakia) Tomáš Oravec (10)
2009–10	1st (Corgoň Liga)	12/(12)	33	7	8	18	33	51	29	Quarter-finals			(Slovakia) Andrej Hodek (6)
2010–11	2nd (1.Liga)	3/(12)	33	13	12	8	55	36	51	3.R			(Slovakia) Radoslav Augustín (14)
2011–12	2nd (1.Liga)	12/(12)	33	4	7	22	22	54	19	2.R			(Slovakia) Roman Jurkovič (5)
2012–13	3rd (Keno 10 3. liga Západ)	11/(16)	30	10	6	14	30	43	36	2.R			(Slovakia) František Hečko (5) (Slovakia) Marián Kolony (5)
2013–14	3rd (TIPOS 3. liga Západ)	14/(16)	30	9	5	16	40	52	26	2.R			(Slovakia) Oliver Špilár (6)
2014–15	5th (OFZ BA-mesto – V.liga)	1/(10)	27	22	0	5	94	48	66				(Slovakia) Tomáš Medveď (23)
2015–16	5th (OFZ BA-mesto – V.liga)	1/(14)	26	20	2	4	89	31	62				(Slovakia) Michal Habai (18)
2016–17	4th (4. Liga)	1/(16)	30	25	4	1	112	13	79	2.R			(Slovakia) Jakub Hronec (21)
2017–18	3rd (TIPOS 3. Liga BA)	1/(16)	30	25	4	1	101	18	79	4.R (1/16F)			(Slovakia) František Lády (21)
2018–19	2nd (II. liga)	8/(16)	30	12	9	9	41	38	45	3.R			(Slovakia) Erik Prekop (12)
2019–20	2nd (II. liga)	14/(16)	18	5	2	11	24	34	17	1/8 Fin			(Slovakia) Ladislav Almási (11)
2020–21	2nd (II. liga)	9/(15)	28	10	7	11	37	41	37	Quarter-finals			(Slovakia) Lukáš Gašparovič (12)
2021–22	2nd (II. liga)	8/(16)	30	12	5	13	54	48	41	2.R			(Slovakia) Boris Turčák (12)
2022–23	2nd (II. liga)	12/(16)	30	8	10	12	40	43	34	3.R			(Bosnia and Herzegovina) Haris Harba (11)
2023–24	2nd (MONACObet liga)	2/(16)	30	19	7	4	64	29	64	3.R			(Slovakia) Patrik Danek (14)
2024–25	2nd (MONACObet liga)	6/(14)	26	10	7	9	32	26	37	4.R			(Slovakia) Roman Begala (5)
2025–26	2nd (MONACObet liga)	4/(16)	30	14	6	10	45	31	45	4.R			(Ghana) Frank Appiah (9)

=== European competition history ===
Season	Competition	Round	Country	Club	Home	Away	Aggregate
2001	UEFA Intertoto Cup	R1	(Lithuania)	FK Ekranas	1–1	1–1	2–2 (4–3 p)
2001	UEFA Intertoto Cup	R2	(Slovenia)	NK Celje	1–1	0–5	1–6
2003–04	UEFA Cup	QR	(Luxembourg)	F91 Dudelange	1–0	1–0	2–0
2003–04	UEFA Cup	R1	(France)	Girondins de Bordeaux	1–1	1–2	2–3
2004–05	UEFA Cup	QR2	(Ukraine)	Dnipro Dnipropetrovsk	0–3	1–1	1–4
2005–06	UEFA Champions League	QR1	(Kazakhstan)	Kairat Almaty	4–1 (aet)	0–2	4–3
2005–06	UEFA Champions League	QR2	(Scotland)	Celtic F.C.	5–0	0–4	5–4
2005–06	UEFA Champions League	QR3	(Serbia and Montenegro)	FK Partizan	0–0	0–0	0–0 (4–3 p)
2005–06	UEFA Champions League	Group H	(Italy)	Inter Milan	0–1	0–4	3rd place
2005–06	UEFA Champions League	Group H	(Portugal)	FC Porto	0–0	3–2	3rd place
2005–06	UEFA Champions League	Group H	(Scotland)	Rangers F.C.	2–2	0–0	3rd place
2005–06	UEFA Cup	R32	(Bulgaria)	Levski Sofia	0–1	0–2	0–3
2006–07	UEFA Cup	QR1	(Georgia (country))	WIT Georgia	1–2	2–0	3–2
2006–07	UEFA Cup	QR2	(Belarus)	Dinamo Minsk	2–1	3–2	5–3
2006–07	UEFA Cup	R1	(Spain)	RCD Espanyol	2–2	1–3	3–5
2007–08	UEFA Cup	QR1	(Moldova)	Zimbru Chișinău	1–1	2–2	3–3 (a)
2007–08	UEFA Cup	QR2	(Armenia)	FC Mika	2–0	1–2	3–2
2007–08	UEFA Cup	R1	(Greece)	Panathinaikos F.C.	1–2	0–3	1–5
2008–09	UEFA Champions League	QR1	(Malta)	Valletta F.C.	1–0	2–0	3–0
2008–09	UEFA Champions League	QR2	(Finland)	Tampere United	4–2	3–1	7–3
2008–09	UEFA Champions League	QR3	(Italy)	Juventus FC	1–1	0–4	1–5
2008–09	UEFA Cup	R1	(Portugal)	S.C. Braga	0–2	0–4	0–6

== Stadium ==
=== First pitch ===
The first sample football match of Pozsonyi Torna Egyesület (PTE) was announced to be played on 25 September 1898, but due to the tragic matters in the Emperors' family (Elisabeth of Bavaria died on 10 September 1898) was postponed to 2 October 1898. The rules of the game were explained to the audience before the match in October. The match was played between members of PTE in both teams at the Ligetfalu highschool playground. There was no regular football pitch in Pressburg at that time, so PTE used the plain terrain to play its home matches in the early years.

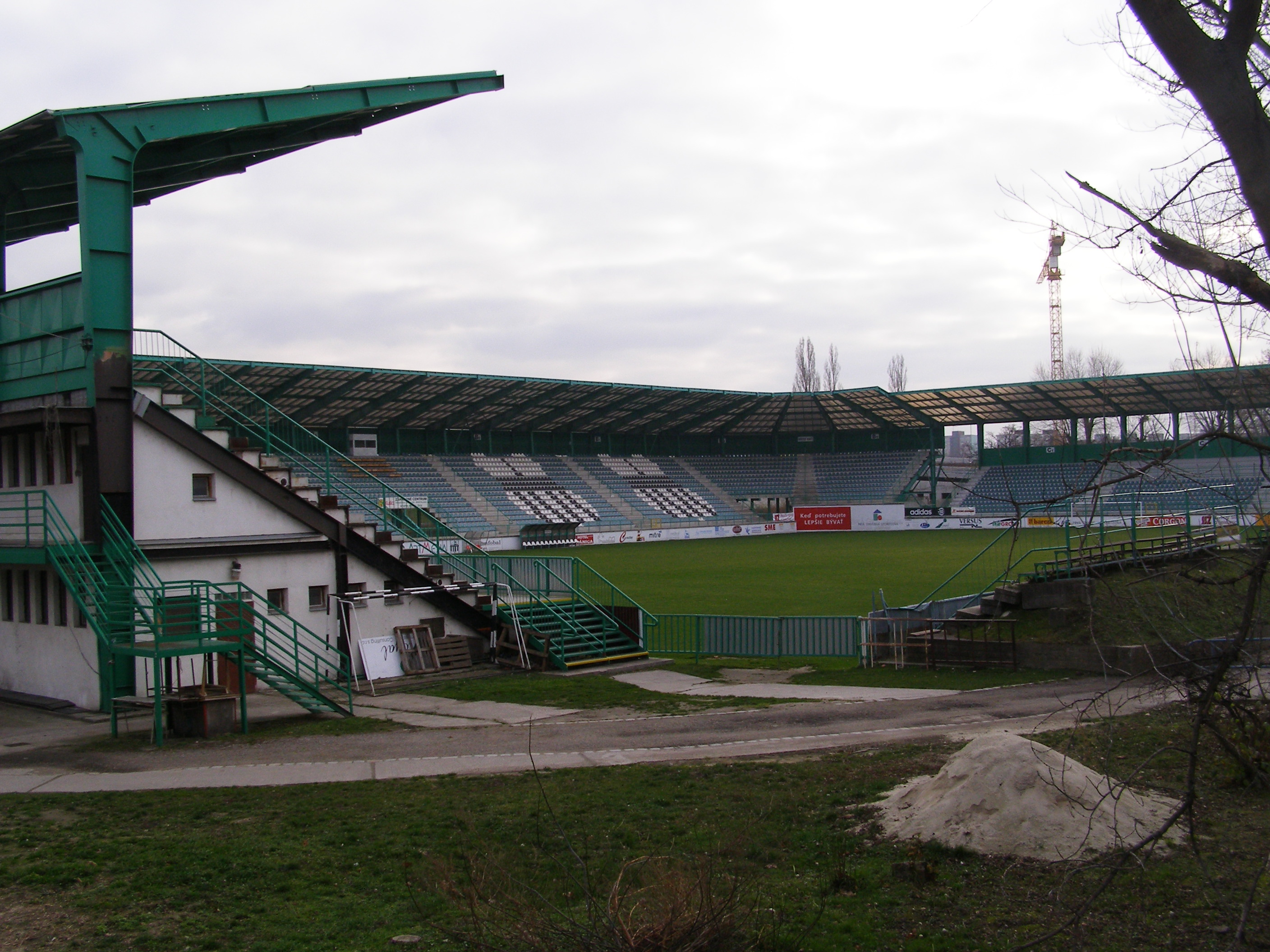
Previous Petržalka stadium

=== Štadión za Starým mostom (PTE stadium) ===
During the extra ordinary club meeting on 29 September 1899 the decision to build the regular pitch for PTE near the Danube river, railway to the Wien and City Park was made. The stadium was built at the end of the 19th century for PTE in a year. The grand opening of the new stadium was officially on 25 September 1900. PTE won the match against Magyar Football Club Budapest 3–2, the first PTEs' win ever against the team from Budapest. This stadium was used for Bratislava regional championship until the stadium for I. Čsl. ŠK Bratislava was built in the end of the 1920s. More than 100 years later Artmedia still used to play their home matches at the same place – named Štadión za Starým mostom.

Today's estimated capacity is 10,000; it is however impossible to give the exact value, because older part of the stadium still remains for standing visitors. The average attendance of league matches at this stadium is floating above 4,000, one of the highest in Slovakia. However, the stadium does not meet some of the UEFA criteria, therefore the club has been forced to play its international matches elsewhere. Notably, they played their 2005–06 UEFA Champions League campaign at Tehelné pole, home venue of crosstown rivals Slovan Bratislava. Stadium was closed in 2009 and demolished in 2012.

=== New home ground – Štadión FC Petržalka ===
In 2011, a new stadium called Stadium FC Petržalka 1898 (Slovak: Štadión FC Petržalka 1898) was built on Sklodowskej street, Petržalka, Slovakia. Originally it served as home stadium for football club FC Petržalka 1898. After its bankruptcy in 2014 it became home for FC Petržalka akadémia and later for the team FC Petržalka. The stadium was officially opened in 2012. The first match was between the home club FC Petržalka 1898 and FC Nitra B (1–3), on 5 August 2012. After its opening the stadium had a single grandstand with 800 seats along its West side. Later upgrades, including adding bleechers on the East side, have increased the capacity to 3000 seats.

== Sponsorship ==
Period	Kit manufacturer	Shirt sponsor
1998–1999	Puma	Telenor
1999–2000	NIKE	Telenor
2000–2002	NIKE	Grafobal
2002–2004	LEGEA	Grafobal
2004–2006	Puma	Grafobal
2006–2011	Adidas	Grafobal
2011–2014	Kappa	none
2014–2016	Erreà	none
2016-2018	Erreà	TK ESTATE
2018–2022	Erreà	none
2022–	Erreà	PORTUM Towers

== Transfers ==
Petržalka have produced numerous players who have gone on to represent the Slovak national football team. Over the last period there has been a steady increase of young players leaving Petržalka after a few years of first team football and moving on to play football in leagues of a higher standard, with the German Bundesliga (Balázs Borbély to 1. FC Kaiserslautern in 2006), Italian Serie A (Blažej Vaščák to A.C.D. Treviso in 2006), French Ligue 1 (Ľuboš Kamenár to FC Nantes in 2009), Russian Premier League (Ján Ďurica, Branislav Fodrek, Branislav Obžera, Peter Petráš all to Saturn in 2006), Austrian Football Bundesliga (Filip Šebo to FK Austria Wien in 2005). The top transfer was agreed in 2008 when Balázs Borbély joined Romanian FC Politehnica Timișoara for a fee of €0.8 million

=== Record departures ===
Rank	Player	To	Fee	Year
1.	(Slovakia) Balázs Borbély	(Romania) Timișoara	€800.000	2008
2.	(Slovakia) Filip Šebo	FK Austria Wien	€600.000* (400.000 GBP)	2005
3.	(Slovakia) Marián Čišovský	(Romania) Timișoara	€550.000*	2008

*-unofficial fee

== Current squad ==
As of 21 July 2026

Note: Flags indicate national team as defined under FIFA eligibility rules; some limited exceptions apply. Players may hold more than one non-FIFA nationality.

No.	Pos.	Nation	Player
4	DF	UKR	Nikita Kelembet
5	MF	GHA	Samuel Alabi
6	MF	SVK	Martin Hlavaty
7	MF	SVK	Dávid Bordáč
9	FW	SVK	Oliver Kubka
10	MF	SVK	Peter Mazan
12	MF	GHA	Collins Boah
19	DF	GRE	Nikolaos Deligiannis
21	DF	SVK	Nicolas Sagan
25	DF	SVK	Alex Barilla
55	GK	SVK	Michal Hudec
70	MF	SVK	Peter Nikolaj
77	FW	SVK	Markus Sevce
79	MF	SVK	Viktor Sliacky

No.	Pos.	Nation	Player
93	MF	SVK	Lukáš Gašparovič
96	MF	SVK	Samuel Šefčík
—	MF	GHA	Derrick Bonsu
—	DF	SVK	Branislav Niňaj
—	MF	CZE	Jakub Kousal
—	DF	SVN	Miha Kompan Breznik
—	MF	SVK	Samuel Habodasz
—	FW	SVK	Adam Goljan
—	DF	SVK	Matúš Capko
—	FW	NGA	Elvis Isaac
—	DF	SVK	Tomas Jasso
—	GK	SVK	Andrej Mikoláš
—	MF	SVK	Jakub Kusalik
—	MF	SVK	Samuel Sablatura

For recent transfers, see List of Slovak football transfers summer 2024.

== Staff ==
Updated 18 May 2024

Staff	Job title
(Slovakia) Michal Kuruc	Manager
(Slovakia) Ivan Minčič	Assistant manager
(Slovakia) Róbert Veselovský	Goalkeeping coach
(Slovakia) Zdeno Biháry	Physiotherapist
(Slovakia) Rudolf Sokol	Doctor

== Player records ==
=== Most goals ===
#	Nat.	Name	Goals
1	(Slovakia)	Milan Strelec	67
2	(Czechoslovakia)	Marián Pochaba	59
3	(Slovakia)	Tomáš Medveď	51
4	(Slovakia)	Ján Kozák jr.	40
5	(Slovakia)	Juraj Halenár	38

Players whose name is listed in bold are still active.

== Notable players ==
Had international caps for their respective countries. Players whose name is listed in bold represented their countries while playing for Petržalka.

Past (and present) players who are the subjects of Wikipedia articles can be found here.

- (Slovakia) Ladislav Almási
- (Ivory Coast) Mamadou Bagayoko
- (Slovakia) **Henrich Benčík**
- (Slovakia) **Balázs Borbély**
- (Slovakia) Erik Čikoš
- (Slovakia) **Marián Čišovský**
- (Slovakia) **Juraj Čobej**
- (Latvia) Vladimirs Draguns
- (Slovakia) **Ján Ďurica**
- (Slovakia) **Pavol Farkaš**
- (Czechoslovakia) (Slovakia) Peter Fieber
- (Slovakia) **Branislav Fodrek**
- (Slovakia) Karim Guédé
- (Slovakia) **Juraj Halenár**
- (Slovakia) Marián Had
- (Slovakia) Miroslav Hýll
- (Curaçao) Quintón Christina
- (Czechoslovakia) (Slovakia) Miroslav Chvíla
- (Slovakia) Jozef Juriga
- (Slovakia) **Ľuboš Kamenár**
- (Czechoslovakia) (Slovakia) **Vladimír Kinder**
- (Slovakia) Tomáš Kóňa
- (Slovakia) Rastislav Kostka
- (Slovakia) **Ján Kozák jr.**
- (Slovakia) Samuel Kozlovský
- (Slovakia) Marek Krejčí
- (Slovakia) František Kubík
- (Czechoslovakia) Ľudovít Lancz
- (Slovakia) Martin Lipčák
- (Slovakia) Ľubomír Luhový
- (Slovakia) Štefan Maixner
- (Czechoslovakia) Marián Masný
- (Serbia) Stefan Mitrović
- (Slovakia) Branislav Niňaj
- (Kingdom of Hungary) **Gyula Nirnsee**
- (Slovakia) Martin Obšitník
- (Slovakia) **Branislav Obžera**
- (Slovakia) Tomáš Oravec
- (Slovakia) Peter Petráš
- (Slovakia) Juraj Piroska
- (Slovakia) Attila Pinte
- (Slovakia) Erik Prekop
- (Slovakia) **Ľubomír Reiter**
- (Slovakia) **Kornel Saláta**
- (Slovakia) Ivan Schranz
- (Slovakia) Miloš Soboňa
- (Slovakia) Dušan Sninský
- (Slovakia) Jakub Sylvestr
- (Slovakia) Otto Szabó
- (Slovakia) Filip Šebo
- (Slovakia) **Anton Šoltis**
- (Czech Republic) Karel Vácha
- (Slovakia) Blažej Vaščák
- (Czechoslovakia) (Slovakia) Vladimír Weiss sr.
- (Slovakia) Vladislav Zvara

== Managers ==
- (Czechoslovakia) František Urvay (1978–79)
- (Czechoslovakia) Anton Urban (1980)
- (Czechoslovakia) Michal Pucher (1981)
- (Czechoslovakia) Dušan Abrahám (1982)
- (Czechoslovakia) Anton Urban (1982–83)
- (Czechoslovakia) Tomáš Nitka (1983)
- (Czechoslovakia) Štefan Slezák (1983–85)
- (Czechoslovakia) Jozef Balažovič (1986)
- (Slovakia) Jozef Prochotský (1995–97)
- (Slovakia) Stanislav Strapek (1997–98)
- (Slovakia) Vladimír Weiss sr.
- (Czech Republic) Karel Stromšík (1998)
- (Slovakia) Vladimír Weiss sr. (1998)
- (Slovakia) Peter Pavlovič (1998–99)
- (Slovakia) Vladimír Weiss sr. (1999–00)
- (Slovakia) Dušan Galis (2000–02)
- (Slovakia) Vladimír Weiss sr. (2002–06)
- (Slovakia) Michal Hipp (2006)
- (Slovakia) Vladimír Weiss sr. (2007–08)
- (Slovakia) Michal Hipp (2008–09)
- (Slovakia) Emil Stranianek (2009)
- (Slovakia) Peter Fieber (2009–10)
- (Slovakia) Vladimír Goffa (2010–11)
- (Slovakia) Norbert Hrnčár (2011–12)
- (Slovakia) Emil Stranianek (2012)
- (Slovakia) Ľubomír Luhový (2012)
- (Slovakia) Alexander Zachariáš (2012)
- (Slovakia) Emil Stranianek (2012–13)
- (Slovakia) Tomáš Medveď (2013–15)
- (Slovakia) Rastislav Kunst (2015–16)
- (Slovakia) Peter Boďo (2016–17)
- (Slovakia) Balázs Borbély (2017–Apr 2019)
- (Slovakia) Miroslav Mentel (Apr 2019)
- (Slovakia) Jozef Dojčan (Jun 2019 – Oct 2019)
- (Slovakia) Vladimír Koník (Oct 2019-30 June 2020)
- (Slovakia) Ladislav Pecko (30 June 2020 – 4 May 2021)
- (Slovakia) Mário Auxt (June 2021-19 June 2022)
- (Slovakia) Ján Haspra (19 June 2022-18 Sep 2022)
- (Slovakia) Alexander Zachariáš (21 Sep 2022-Apr 2023)
- (Slovakia) Michal Kuruc (Apr 2023-May 2025)
- (Slovakia) Ľubomír Reiter (Jun 2025-Oct 2025)
- (Slovakia) Rastislav Urgela (Oct 2025-)

== See also ==
- 2005–06 FC Artmedia Bratislava season
