= Ľubomír Luhový =

Slovak footballer (born 1967)

Personal information
- Date of birth: 31 March 1967 (age 59)
- Place of birth: Považská Bystrica, Czechoslovakia
- Height: 1.84 m (6 ft 0 in)
- Position: Striker

Senior career*
Years	Team	Apps	(Gls)
1985	Púchov	12	(2)
1986	Inter Bratislava	5	(0)
1986–1988	Banská Bystrica	15	(3)
1988–1990	Inter Bratislava	53	(25)
1990–1992	Martigues	64	(33)
1992–1994	Inter Bratislava	44	(29)
1994	Urawa Reds	16	(8)
1995–1997	Inter Bratislava	46	(22)
1997–1998	Spartak Trnava	24	(17)
1998–2000	Grazer AK	21	(3)
2000	Petržalka	6	(1)
Total		306	(143)

International career
1990–1993	Czechoslovakia	2	(0)
1995–1998	Slovakia	9	(0)

Managerial career
- FC Nitra
- 2006–2009: Iskra Petržalka
- 2010: Inter Bratislava
- 2010–2012: Třinec
- 2012: Petržalka
- 2013–2015: Gabčíkovo
- * Club domestic league appearances and goals

Ľubomír Luhový (born 31 March 1967) is a Slovak former footballer and manager. He served as sporting director of Třinec. At club level, Luhový spent most of his career for FK Inter Bratislava.

== Biography ==
Luhový played for FC Martigues in the French Ligue 2 during the 1991–92 season. He played twice for the Czechoslovakia national team. and made nine appearances for the Slovakia national team.

Luhový started his managerial career with FC Nitra in 2003. He moved Fotbal Třinec in Czech 2. Liga on 7 October 2010 and was promoted to first-team coach in April 2012 when Třinec finished 13th in the table. However, Luhový stayed on at the club in a new role, as sporting director.

Luhový is the younger brother of former Czechoslovak international Milan Luhový. In 2013, he and his wife Beáta Luhová divorced after 25 years of marriage.

== Career statistics ==
=== Club ===
Appearances and goals by club, season and competition
Club	Season	League		
Club	Season	Division	Apps	Goals
Matador Púchov	1985–86		12	2
Internacional Slovnaft Bratislava	1985–86	Czechoslovak First League	5	0
Dukla Banská Bystrica	1986–87	Czechoslovak First League	3	0
Dukla Banská Bystrica	1987–88	Czechoslovak First League	12	3
Dukla Banská Bystrica	Total		15	3
Internacional Slovnaft Bratislava	1988–89	Czechoslovak First League	23	5
Internacional Slovnaft Bratislava	1989–90	Czechoslovak First League	30	20
Internacional Slovnaft Bratislava	Total		53	25
Martigues	1990–91	Division 2	31	16
Martigues	1991–92	Division 2	33	17
Martigues	Total		64	33
Inter Slovnaft Bratislava	1992–93	Czechoslovak First League	28	17
Inter Slovnaft Bratislava	1993–94	Slovak Superliga	16	12
Inter Slovnaft Bratislava	Total		44	29
Urawa Reds	1994	J1 League	16	8
Inter Slovnaft Bratislava	1994–95	Slovak Superliga	9	3
Inter Slovnaft Bratislava	1995–96	Slovak Superliga	27	10
Inter Slovnaft Bratislava	1996–97	Slovak Superliga	10	9
Inter Slovnaft Bratislava	Total		46	22
Spartak Trnava	1997–98	Slovak Superliga	24	17
Grazer AK	1998–99	Bundesliga	21	3
Grazer AK	1999–2000	Bundesliga	0	0
Grazer AK	Total		21	3
Artmedia Petržalka	2000–01		6	1
Career total			306	143

=== International ===
Appearances and goals by national team and year
National team	Year	Apps	Goals
Czechoslovakia	1990	1	0
Czechoslovakia	1991	0	0
Czechoslovakia	1992	0	0
Czechoslovakia	1993	1	0
Total		2	0
Slovakia	1995	2	0
Slovakia	1996	1	0
Slovakia	1997	2	0
Slovakia	1998	4	0
Total		9	0

== Honours ==
- 1997–98 Slovak Superliga top goalscorer (17 goals)
