= Martin Obšitník =

Slovak footballer

Personal information
- Full name: Martin Obšitník
- Date of birth: 2 November 1969 (age 56)
- Place of birth: Košice, Czechoslovakia
- Height: 1.82 m (6 ft 0 in)
- Position: Midfielder

Team information
- Current team: FC Petržalka akadémia
- Number: 24

Youth career
- Lokomotíva Košice

Senior career*
Years	Team	Apps	(Gls)
1987–1988	Lokomotíva Košice		
1988–1995	Inter Bratislava		
1995–1996	1. FC Košice		
1996–1997	Dukla Banská Bystrica		
1997–1998	Lokomotíva Košice		
1998–1999	HFC Humenné		
1999–2001	Dynamo České Budějovice	32	(5)
2002–2003	1. FC Košice		
2003–2004	Artmedia Petržalka		
2004–2005	Slovan Bratislava		
2008	Ružinov		
2014–	Petržalka akadémia		

International career
1989	Czechoslovakia U20		
1994	Slovakia	4	(0)
- * Club domestic league appearances and goals as of 27 August 2014

Martin Obšitník (born 2 November 1969, in Košice) is a former Slovak professional football midfielder who currently plays for FC Petržalka akadémia. Obšitník is a participant of 1989 FIFA World Youth Championship. He played for Slovakia four games in 1994. He played in the Gambrinus liga for two seasons with Dynamo České Budějovice.
