= Igor Popovec =

Slovak footballer

Personal information
- Date of birth: 6 May 1966 (age 60)
- Place of birth: Stropkov, Czechoslovakia
- Position: Forward

Senior career*
Years	Team	Apps	(Gls)
1985–1987	Sigma Olomouc	7	(0)
1987–1988	Dukla Banská Bystrica	5	(0)
1993–1996	Lokomotíva Košice	93	(22)
1997–1998	MŠK Žilina	17	(2)
- * Club domestic league appearances and goals

Igor Popovec (born 6 May 1966) is a retired Slovak football striker.
