= Jozef Hrivňák =

Slovak footballer

Personal information
- Date of birth: 17 February 1973 (age 53)
- Height: 1.88 m (6 ft 2 in)
- Position: Forward

Senior career*
Years	Team	Apps	(Gls)
–1997	JAS Bardejov		
1998	Austria Wien	6	(1)
1998–1999	TSV Pöllau		
1999	Eintracht Trier		
2000	BV Cloppenburg		
2000–2001	TSV Pöllau		
- * Club domestic league appearances and goals

Jozef Hrivňák (born 17 February 1973) is a retired Slovak football striker.
