= Eugen Bari =

Slovak footballer

Personal information
- Full name: Eugen Bari
- Date of birth: 24 June 1971 (age 55)
- Place of birth: Czechoslovakia
- Height: 1.76 m (5 ft 9 1/2 in)
- Position: Forward

Team information
- Current team: TJ Sklotatran Poltár (manager)

Senior career*
Years	Team	Apps	(Gls)
1993–1994	Fiľakovo		
1993–1994	→ Baník Prievidza (loan)	6	(0)
1994–1996	DAC Dunajská Streda	59	(12)
1996–1998	FC Nitra	29	(4)
1998–2000	ZTS Dubnica	51	(10)
2000	→ Lučenec (loan)	6	(0)
2000–2001	Dukla Banská Bystrica	?	(4)
2005–2008	Fiľakovo		
2008–2009	OŠK Radzovce		
2009	OŠK Biskupice		
2010	TJ Slovan Halič		

Managerial career
- 2005–2008: Fiľakovo
- 2009: OŠK Biskupice (playing manager)
- 2010: TJ Slovan Halič (playing manager)
- 2012: Fiľakovo (youths)
- 2013: TJ Družstevník Tachty
- 2013–?: TJ Sklotatran Poltár
- 2019: Rimavská Sobota
- 2020–2021: Fiľakovo
- 2022–2024: Rimavská Sobota
- * Club domestic league appearances and goals as of 28 September 2013

Eugen Bari (born 24 June 1971) is a Slovak former professional footballer and current manager of TJ Sklotatran Poltár. Bari was nicknamed "The Slovak Romário" after the famous Romário of Brazil.

Throughout his career, Bari played for Dunajská Streda, Nitra, Dukla Banská Bystrica and Vác.

== Club career ==
Bari was 17 years old when he made his debut for the men's team. Fiľakovo was playing a friendly match against Spartak Trnava, where Bari would come onto the pitch as a substitute midway through the second half.

== Managerial career ==
After returning to Fiľakovo, Bari became a youth coach. He later became the head coach of the club.

== Personal life ==
Bari is of Roma (Gypsy) origin. His son Kristián is currently playing for MŠK Žilina.
