= Michal Pančík (footballer, born 1971) =

Slovak footballer

Personal information
- Full name: Michal Pančík
- Date of birth: 17 December 1971 (age 54)
- Place of birth: Brezno, Czechoslovakia
- Height: 1.83 m (6 ft 0 in)
- Position: Midfielder

Senior career*
Years	Team	Apps	(Gls)
1991–1992	Inter Bratislava	5	(0)
1994–1996	1. FC Košice	47	(14)
1996–1999	Baník Ostrava	76	(9)
1999	Dukla Banská Bystrica	14	(1)
2000–2002	Slovan Bratislava	70	(12)
2003–2004	ŽP Šport Podbrezová	24	(5)

International career
2000	Slovakia U23	3	(0)
1995	Slovakia	1	(0)

Managerial career
- 2019–2021: Inter Bratislava
- * Club domestic league appearances and goals

Michal Pančík (born 17 December 1971) is a Slovak international football midfielder who played for clubs in the former Czechoslovakia.

== Career ==
Born in Brezno, Pančík began playing football for Inter Bratislava in the Czechoslovak First League. Later, he would make 76 appearances in the Czech first division for Baník Ostrava.

Pančík played for Slovakia at the 2000 Summer Olympics in Sydney.
