= FK Inter Bratislava =

Association football club in Bratislava, Slovakia

- Full name: Futbalový Klub Inter Bratislava a.s.
- Nickname: žlto-čierni (yellow-blacks)
- Founded: 1 July 1940; 86 years ago (as ŠK Apollo)
- Stadium: Pasienky, Bratislava
- Capacity: 11,591
- Owner(s): Michal Viktorin 80% Ján Palenčár, Marcel Grega 20%
- President: Jozef Barmoš
- Head coach: Vladimír Cifranič
- League: 2. Liga
- 2025–26: 8th of 16
- Website: fkinterbratislava.sk
Home colours	Away colours

FK Inter Bratislava (Slovak pronunciation: [ˈinter ˈbracislaʋa]) is a football club based in Bratislava, Slovakia, temporarily playing its home matches in Štadion Pasienky.

== History ==
Inter Bratislava was founded in 1940 by the Apollo refinery (later renamed Slovnaft). Following the end of World War II and the re-establishment of Czechoslovakia, the club developed into an important force in Czechoslovak football. While it remains unclear, whether it is Inter Bratislava or FK ŠKP Inter Dúbravka Bratislava, who can claim the successful run of Červená Hviezda Bratislava in the 1950s and early 1960s as its own, club's achievements in the subsequent decades (as TJ Internacionál Slovnaft Bratislava) can be hardly disputed. Between 1962 and 1993 the club spent 29 out of 31 seasons in the Czechoslovak First League, finishing twice as runner-up in the 1970s and winning the Slovak Cup in the seasons 1983–84, 1987–88, and 1989–90. Over these years, a number of Inter players represented Czechoslovakia at senior level. In 1976, Jozef Barmoš, Ladislav Jurkemik, and Ladislav Petráš were in the squad that won the UEFA Euro 1976. Four years later, Barmoš and Jurkemik were also a part of the side that finished third at the 1980 European Championship. In a decade that followed the dissolution of Czechoslovakia, Inter went on to flourish in the newly established top tier of Slovak football as well as in the Slovak Cup, winning the Slovak double in the 1999–2000 and 2000–2001 seasons.

=== Inter's fall and re-establishment ===
Inter Bratislava won the 1. liga in the 2008–2009 season and was supposed to be promoted to the Slovak top flight. However, financial problems of the club led its owner Ľubomír Chrenko to sell Inter's licence to FK Senica in June 2009. As a result, players of the senior squad of Inter Bratislava joined Senica, whilst youth teams of Inter were preserved by the Inter Bratislava Civic Association, which had been formed from the Inter Fan Club.

The senior side was re-established in the 2010–2011 season, playing in the V. liga, i.e. the sixth tier of Slovak football. Major changes in the structure of the club were accompanied by Inter's move from the Štadión Pasienky, which had been used by the team since 1967, to the considerably smaller Štadión Drieňová ulica. After playing at the Štadión Drieňová ulica for four seasons, the senior team moved to the Štadión ŠKP Inter Dúbravka in the summer of 2014. The grounds have a capacity of 10,200. Since the season 2015/2016 due to unknown issues the Men team returned to stadium Drieňová ulica and the youth teams remained on Stadium ŠKP Inter Dúbravka. In the autumn part of the season 2016/2017 Inter was playing home matches on the stadium in Petržalka on Marie Curie-Skłodowska street (stadium of FC Petržalka akadémia), but in spring 2017 the team moved to the city of Stupava, where the team owners created the training center for Inter. The future plans are to return to Bratislava, Stupava serving as the training center. Following a fall of from the 2nd Division, Inter collapsed all the way to the IV. Liga, from which it has bounced back to the National 3rd Division, with the hopes of getting promoted in the upcoming seasons.

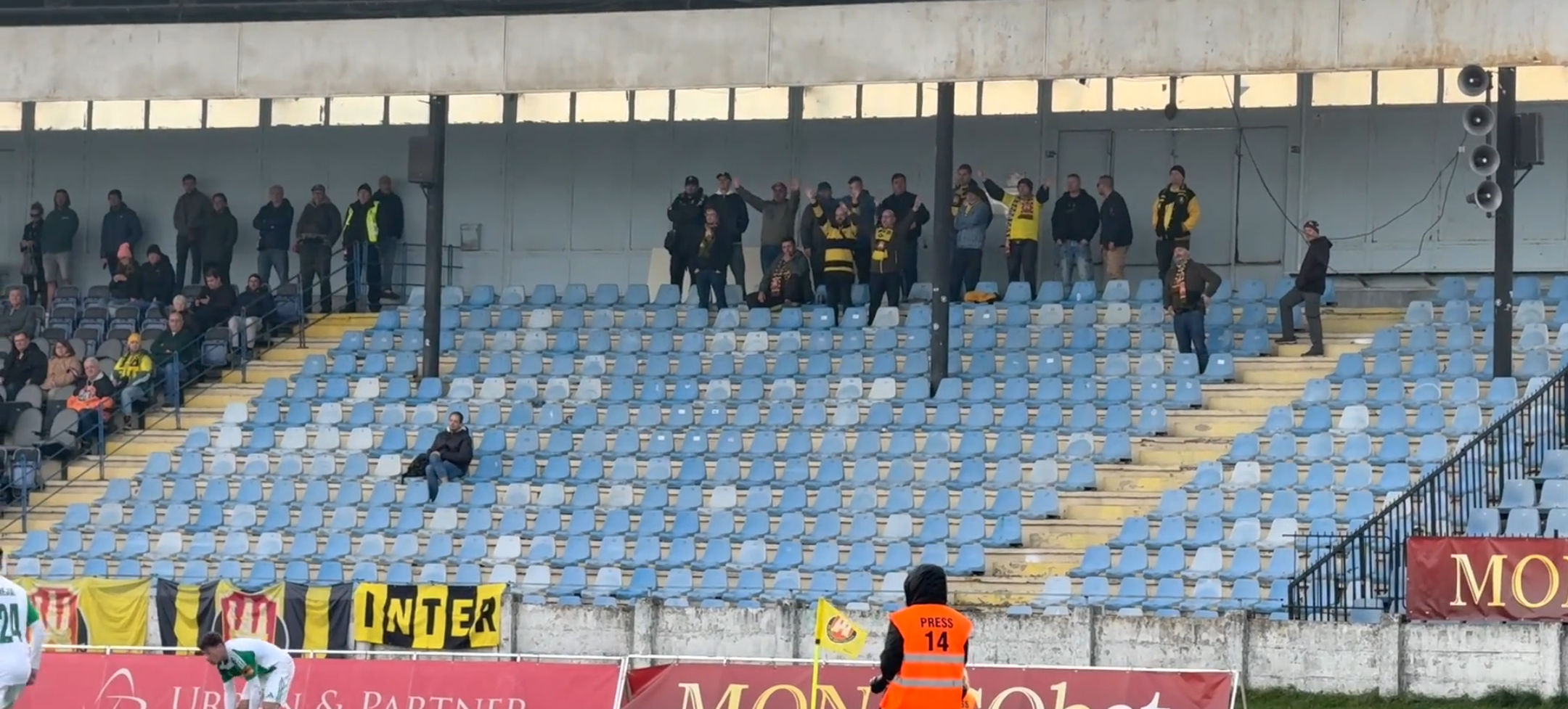
Inter Bratislava supporters.

In 2023, the club has once again returned to their Bratislava stadium - Štadión Pasienky. This is only a temporary arrangement for the upcoming 2 seasons, as the area will be used by the developer JTRE to build apartment houses.

=== Event timeline ===
- 1940 – Founded as ŠK Apollo Bratislava
- 1945 – Renamed TKNB Bratislava
- 1948 – Renamed Sokol SNB Bratislava
- 1952 – Renamed TJ Červená Hviezda Bratislava (Red Star)
- 1959 – First European qualification, 1959–60
- 1962 – Merged with TJ Iskra Slovnaft Bratislava and TJ Slovnaft Bratislava
- 1965 – Renamed TJ Internacionál Slovnaft Bratislava
- 1986 – Merged with TJ ZŤS Petržalka into TJ Internacionál Slovnaft ZŤS Bratislava
- 1991 – Renamed AŠK Inter Slovnaft Bratislava
- 2004 – Renamed FK Inter Bratislava
- 2009 – Sold club license of FK Inter Bratislava to FK Senica
- 2009 – Transforming of Inter Fan Club on Inter Bratislava o.z. (Civic association)
- 2014 – Transforming of Inter Bratislava o.z. on FK Inter Bratislava a.s.

== Affiliated clubs ==
The following clubs have been affiliated with FK Inter Bratislava:

- (Slovakia) AS Trenčín (2016–2021)
- (Slovakia) FKM Stupava (2016–2022)

== Stadium ==
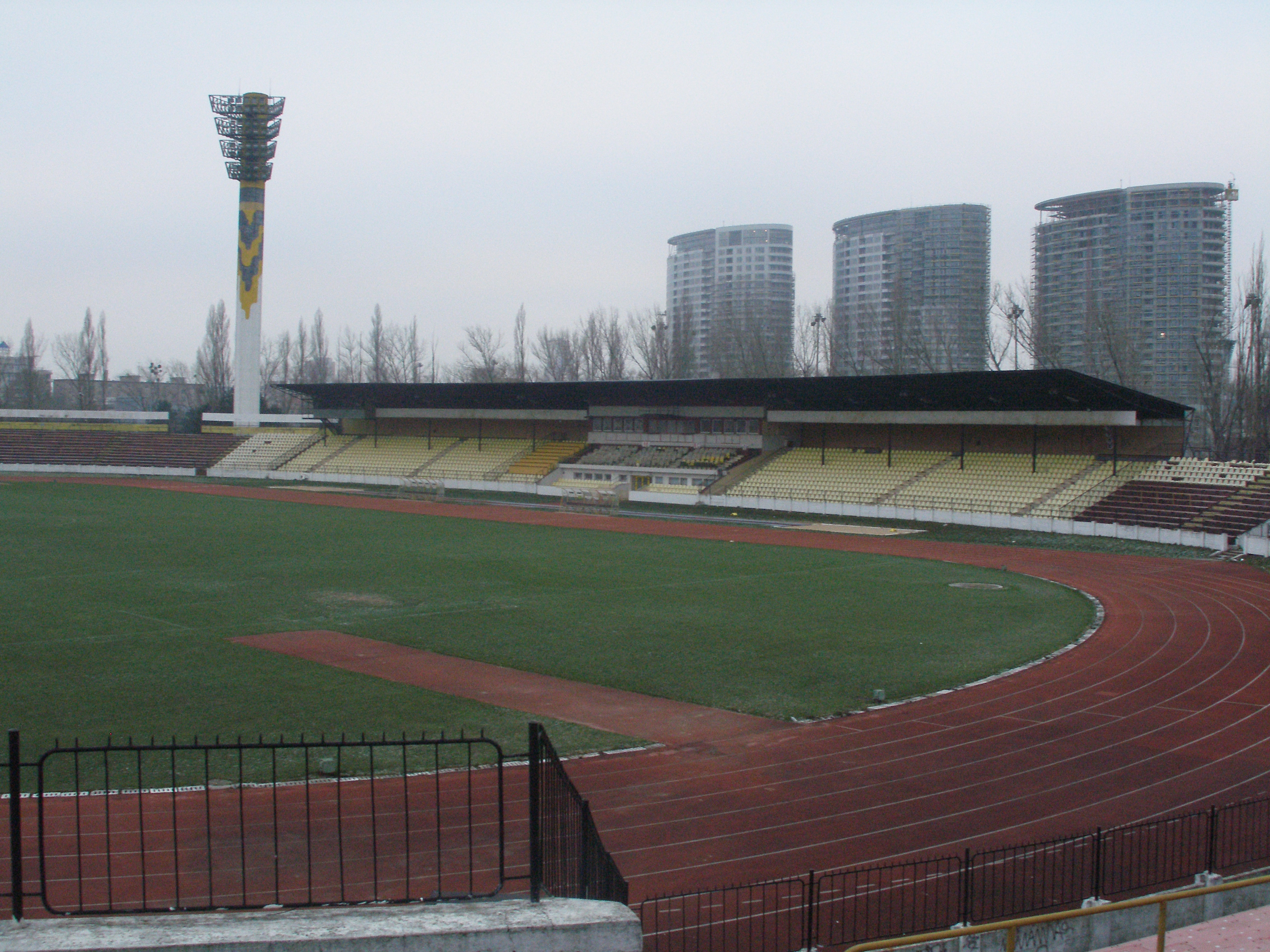
Stadium Pasienky in Bratislava

Stadium Pasienky is a multi-use stadium in Bratislava, Slovakia. It was used mostly for football matches and was the home ground of FK Inter Bratislava. The stadium holds 13,295 people.

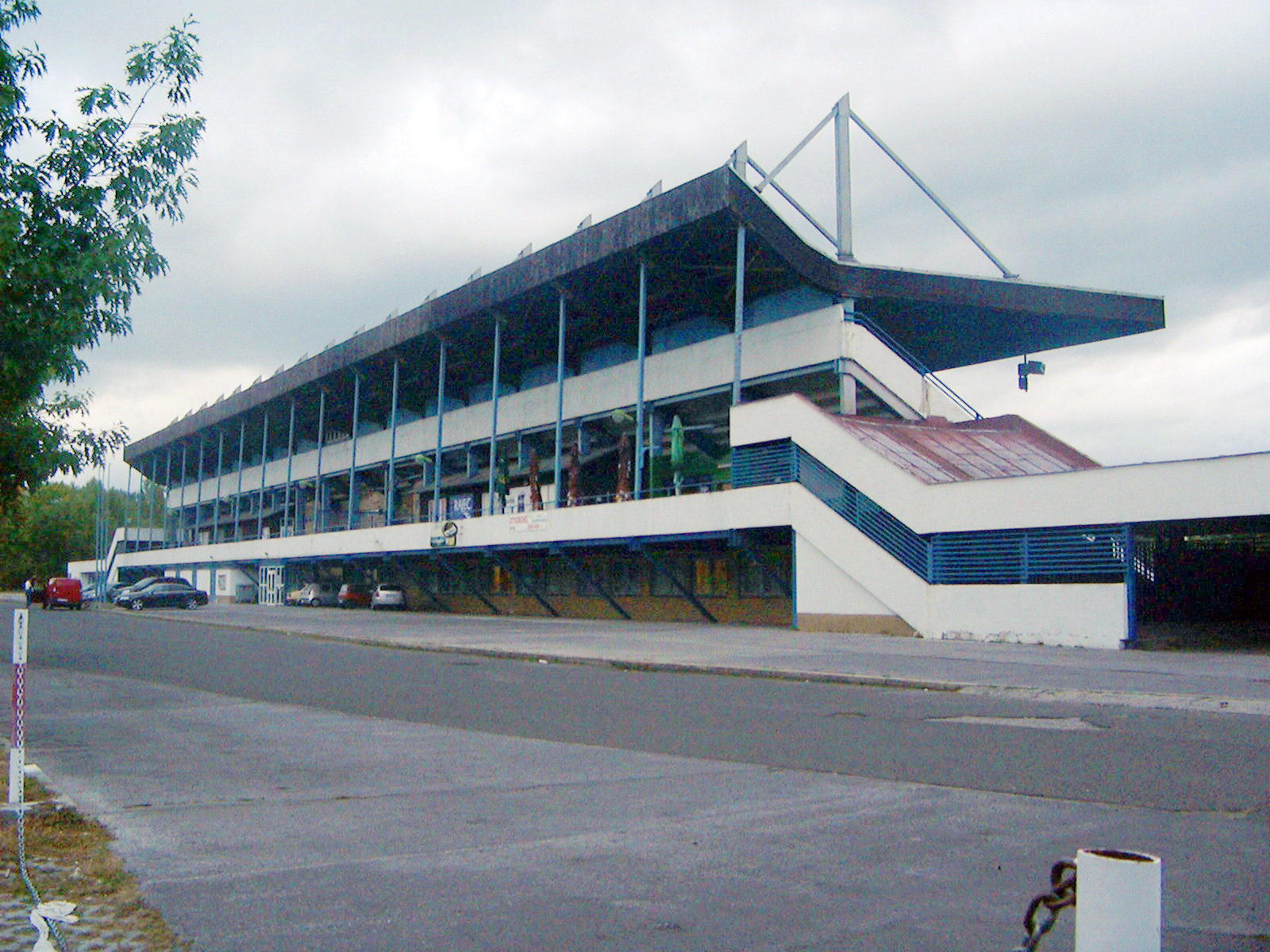
Stadium ŠKP Inter Dúbravka in Dúbravka-Bratislava

Since the 2014/2015 season, the home ground of FK Inter Bratislava has been the Štadión ŠKP Inter Dúbravka. Since the season 2015/2016 due to unknown issues the Men team returned to stadium Drieňová ulica and the youth teams remained on Stadium ŠKP Inter Dúbravka. In the autumn part of the season 2016/2017 Inter was playing home matches on the stadium in Petržalka on Marie Curie-Skłodowska street (stadium of FC Petržalka akadémia), but in spring 2017 the team moved to the city of Stupava, where the team owners created the training center for Inter. The future plans are to return to Bratislava, Stupava serving as the training center. In the 2024/25 season, Inter has once again returned to Pasienky, although only temporarily.

== Sponsorship ==
Period	Kit manufacturer	Shirt sponsor
1998–2002	hummel	Slovnaft
2002–2006	NIKE	Slovnaft
2006–2009	Legea	Asset
2009–2019	hummel	none
2020-	Adidas	none

== Honours ==
=== Domestic ===
Czechoslovakia

- Czechoslovak First League (1944–93)
  - Winners (1): 1958–59
  - Runners-up (3): 1960–61, 1974–75, 1976–77
  - 3rd place (6): 1953, 1953, 1954, 1957-58, 1961-62, 1989-90,
- 1.SNL (1st Slovak National football league) (1969–1993)
  - Winners (1): 1986–87

Slovakia

- Slovak First Football League (1993–)
  - Winners (2): 1999–2000, 2000–01
  - Runners-up (2): 1993–94, 1998–99
- Slovenský Pohár (Slovak Cup) (1961–)
  - Winners (6): 1983–84, 1987–88, 1989–90, 1994–95, 1999–2000, 2000–01
  - Runners-up (2):1975–76, 1978–79

=== European ===
Mitropa Cup

  - Winners (1): 1968–69
  - Runners-up (1): 1969–70

UEFA International Football Cup

  - Winners (2): 1962-63, 1963-64

UEFA Intertoto Cup

  - Winners in group (2): 1976, 1977

=== Czechoslovak and Slovak Top Goalscorer ===
The Czechoslovak League top scorer from 1944 to 1945 until 1992–93. Since the 1993–94 Slovak League Top scorer.

Year	Winner	G
1961–62	(Czechoslovakia) Adolf Scherer	24
1974–75	(Czechoslovakia) Ladislav Petráš	20
1989–90	(Czechoslovakia) Ľubomír Luhový	20
1999–00	(Slovakia) Szilárd Németh	16
2000–01	(Slovakia) Szilárd Németh	23

^{1}Shared award

== Players ==
=== Current squad ===
As of 19 August 2026

Note: Flags indicate national team as defined under FIFA eligibility rules; some limited exceptions apply. Players may hold more than one non-FIFA nationality.

No.	Pos.	Nation	Player
1	GK	SVK	Peter Sokol
2	DF	SVK	Kristián Mihálek
3	DF	SVK	Adam Lami
4	DF	NGR	Atiki Timi Egbe
5	DF	SVK	Lukáš Remeň (vice-captain)
6	MF	SVK	Dávid Straka (on loan from AS Trenčín B)
7	FW	CZE	Denis Franke
8	MF	SVK	Samuel Svetlík
9	DF	SVK	Alexander Tóth
10	MF	ESP	Óscar Castellano
12	FW	SVK	Tomáš Vantruba
13	MF	SVK	Ronald Kubovič
14	FW	SVK	Boris Polevka
15	MF	SVK	Tomas Balko
15	FW	GHA	Bernard Ababio

No.	Pos.	Nation	Player
16	FW	NGR	Adebayo Isa Yusuf
17	DF	SVK	Marek Václav
18	FW	SVK	David Nestrak
19	DF	SVK	Richard Nagy
20	FW	SVK	Pavol Bellás
21	MF	SVK	Martin Kušnír
22	FW	SVK	Viktor Tatár
23	DF	SVK	Daniel Žiška (on loan from AS Trenčín B)
24	GK	SVK	Michal Šulla
30	GK	SVK	Marek Hamrák
33	MF	SVK	Juraj Piroska (captain)
—	MF	SVK	Marek Sokol
—	MF	SVK	Ivan Betík
—	MF	VEN	Luis Carrero

For recent transfers, see List of Slovak football transfers summer 2026.

=== Current technical staff ===
Updated 17 July 2025

Staff	Job title
(Slovakia) Vladimír Cifranič	Manager
(Slovakia) Juraj Piroska	Assistant manager
(Slovakia) Miroslav Mentel	GK coach
(Slovakia) Jozef Barmoš	President
(Slovakia) Ľubomír Talda	general manager
(Slovakia) Peter Chudina	Team Doctor
(Slovakia) Patrik Dulovič	Masseur

== Transfers ==
Inter have produced numerous players who have gone on to represent the Slovak national football team. Over the last period there has been a steady increase of young players leaving Inter after a few years of first team football and moving on to play football in leagues of a higher standard, with the German Bundesliga (Vratislav Greško to Leverkusen in 1999), Turkish Süper Lig (Juraj Czinege to Elazığspor in 2003, Roman Kratochvíl to Denizlispor in 2002), Super League Greece (Miroslav Drobňák to Xanthi F.C. in 2003, Marián Šuchančok to Akratitos F.C. in 2002, Marián Ľalík to Panionios F.C. in 2003, Czech First League (Marek Čech and Peter Babnič to Sparta Prague in 2004 and 2001, Peter Németh to FC Baník Ostrava in 2001), Russian Premier League (Zsolt Hornyák to FC Dynamo Moscow in 2001). The top transfer was agreed in 2001 when 23years old forward and topscorer Szilárd Németh joined Premier League team Middlesbrough F.C. for a fee €6.75 million which was the highest ever paid to a Slovak club.

=== Record transfers ===
Rank	Player	To	Fee	Year
1.	(Slovakia) Szilárd Németh	(England) Middlesbrough F.C.	€6.75 million*	2001
2.	(Slovakia) Vratislav Greško	(Germany) Bayer 04 Leverkusen	€1.0 million	1999
3.	(Slovakia) Marek Čech	(Czech Republic) Sparta Prague	€0.6 million*	2004
4.	(Slovakia) Peter Babnič	(Czech Republic) Sparta Prague	€0.4 million*	2001

*-unofficial fee

== Results ==
=== League and domestic cup history ===
Slovak League only (1993–present)

Season	Division (Name)	Pos./Teams	Pl.	W	D	L	GS	GA	P	Slovak Cup	Europe		Top scorer (Goals)
1993–94	1st (1. liga)	2/(12)	32	18	4	10	65	45	40	Semi-finals			(Slovakia) Martin Obšitník (14)
1994–95	1st (1. liga)	3/(12)	32	14	8	10	47	45	50	Winner	UC	PR ( (Finland) MYPA)	
1995–96	1st (1. liga)	9/(12)	32	11	7	14	42	45	40	2.R	CWC	1.R ( (Spain) Zaragoza)	(Slovakia) Jaroslav Timko (9)
1996–97	1st (1. liga)	4/(16)	30	13	9	8	38	35	48	Semi-finals			(Austria) Rolf Landerl (10)
1997–98	1st (Mars Superliga)	3/(16)	30	18	6	6	55	25	60	Semi-finals			(Slovakia) Peter Babnič (9)
1998–99	1st (Mars Superliga)	2/(16)	30	21	5	4	64	15	68	Quarter-finals	UC	Q2 ( (Czech Republic) Slavia Prague)	(Slovakia) Peter Babnič (13)
1999–00	1st (Mars Superliga)	1/(16)	30	21	7	2	65	16	70	Winner	UC	2.R ( (France) FC Nantes)	(Slovakia) Szilárd Németh (16)
2000–01	1st (Mars Superliga)	1/(10)	36	25	5	6	73	28	80	Winner	CL; UC	Q3 ( (France) Lyon); 2.R ( (Russia) Lokomotiv)	(Slovakia) Szilárd Németh (23)
2001–02	1st (Mars Superliga)	3/(10)	36	16	8	12	53	39	56	Quarter-finals	CL; UC	Q3 ( (Norway) Rosenborg); 1.R ( (Bulgaria) Litex)	(Slovakia) Miroslav Drobňák (9)
2002–03	1st (1. liga)	6/(10)	36	12	7	17	48	58	43	1.R			(Slovakia) Miroslav Drobňák (10) (Slovakia) Juraj Halenár (10)
2003–04	1st (Corgoň Liga)	7/(10)	36	12	9	15	38	44	45	2.R			(Slovakia) Juraj Halenár (9)
2004–05	1st (Corgoň Liga)	9/(10)	36	9	11	16	37	60	38	Quarter-finals			(Slovakia) Juraj Halenár (12)
2005–06	1st (Corgoň Liga)	9/(10)	36	7	9	20	27	62	30	2.R			(Slovakia) Marián Tomčák (6)
2006–07	1st (Corgoň Liga)	13/(16)	36	11	11	14	39	40	44	3.R			(Slovakia) Radoslav Kunzo (6)
2007–08	2nd (1. liga)	3/(12)	33	15	8	10	49	40	53	Quarter-finals			(Slovakia) Tomáš Majtán (16)
2008–09	2nd (1. liga)	1/(12)	33	19	10	4	64	27	67	2.R			
2009–10													
2010–11	6th (V. liga Seniori BA-Mesto)	1/(12)	22	18	2	2	72	15	56				
2011–12	5th (IV. liga Seniori BA-Mesto)	1/(14)	26	16	6	4	62	28	54				
2012–13	4th (Majstrovstvá regiónu BA)	7/(16)	30	13	7	10	42	33	46				
2013–14	4th (Majstrovstvá regiónu BA)	1/(17)	32	21	9	2	83	24	72				
2014–15	3rd (III. liga Bratislava)	6/(16)	30	13	8	9	46	41	47	4.R			
2015–16	3rd (III. liga Bratislava)	2/(16)	30	18	6	6	70	20	60	2.R			(Slovakia) Patrik Fedor (13)
2016–17	3rd (III. liga Bratislava)	1/(16)	30	24	4	2	93	11	76	3.R			(Slovakia) Jakub Šulc (23)
2017–18	2nd (DOXXbet liga)	8/(16)	30	12	5	13	45	46	41	5.R			(Slovakia) Erik Prekop (8)
2018–19	2nd (II. liga)	14/(16)	30	8	5	17	37	56	29	4.R			(Slovakia) Jakub Šulc (11)
2019–20	3rd (III. liga)	2/(16)	15	11	2	2	46	16	35	Not enter			(Slovakia) Tomáš Majtán (14)
2020–21	3rd (III. liga)	2/(16)	15	10	1	4	53	21	31	Not enter			(Slovakia) Tomáš Majtán (13)
2021–22	3rd (III. liga)	3/(16)	30	21	6	3	79	18	69	Not enter			(Slovakia) Andrej Labuda (18)
2022–23	3rd (III. liga)	13/(16)	28	8	7	13	34	43	31	3.R			(Slovakia) Tomáš Majtán (6)
2023–24	4th (IV. liga Bratislava)	1/(16)	30	25	3	2	78	33	78	1.R			(Slovakia) Ivan Betík (23)
2024–25	3rd (3. Liga (Západ))	3/(17)	32	19	4	9	64	30	61	2.R			(Slovakia) Lukáš Remeň (11)
2025–26	2nd (2. Liga (Slovakia))	8/(16)	30	12	6	12	35	36	42	4.R			(Slovakia) Pavol Bellás (8)

=== European competition history ===
Season	Competition	Round	Country	Club	Home	Away	Aggregate
1959–60	European Cup	Preliminary round	(Portugal)	F.C. Porto	2–1	2–0	4–1
1959–60	European Cup	1. Round	(Scotland)	Rangers F.C.	1–1	3–4	4–5
1960	Mitropa Cup	Group	(Hungary)	Tatabányai Bányász	3–3	1–2	4–5
1961–62	Mitropa Cup	Group					
1961–62	Mitropa Cup	Group	(Czechoslovakia)	Slovan Nitra	3–4		
1961–62	Mitropa Cup	Group	(Austria)	SV Stickstoff	8–2		
1961–62	Mitropa Cup	Group	(Italy)	FC Torino		4–2	
1967–68	Mitropa Cup	1. Round	(Hungary)	FC Tatabánya	7–0	1–3	8–3
1967–68	Mitropa Cup	Quarter-finals	(Socialist Federal Republic of Yugoslavia)	Red Star Belgrade	3–2	0–3	3–5
1968–69	Mitropa Cup	1. Round	(Italy)	Palermo	3–0	0–1	3–1
1968–69	Mitropa Cup	Quarter-finals	(Austria)	Admira Wien	1–1	2–2	3–3(a)
1968–69	Mitropa Cup	Semi-finals	(Hungary)	Vasas SC	1–0	2–2	3–2
1968–69	Mitropa Cup	Final	(Czech Republic)	Sklo Union Teplice	4–1	0–0	4–1
1969–70	Mitropa Cup	1. Round	(Austria)	First Vienna	6–1		6–1
1969–70	Mitropa Cup	Quarter-finals	(Austria)	Wacker Innsbruck	3–0	0–1	3–1
1969–70	Mitropa Cup	Semi-finals	(Hungary)	Honvéd	2–1	1–0	3–1
1969–70	Mitropa Cup	Final	(Hungary)	Vasas SC	2–1	1–4	3–4
1975–76	UEFA Cup	1. Round	(Spain)	Real Zaragoza	5–0	3–2	8–2
1975–76	UEFA Cup	2. Round	(Greece)	AEK Athens	2–0	1–3	3–3(a)
1975–76	UEFA Cup	3. Round	(Poland)	Stal Mielec	1–0	0–2	1–2
1977–78	UEFA Cup	1. Round	(Austria)	SK Rapid Wien	0–1	3–0	3–1
1977–78	UEFA Cup	2. Round	(Switzerland)	Grasshoppers	1–0	1–5	2–5
1983–84	UEFA Cup	1. Round	(Malta)	Rabat Ajax F.C.	10–0	6–0	16–0
1983–84	UEFA Cup	2. Round	(Socialist Federal Republic of Yugoslavia)	Radnički Niš	3–2	0–4	3–6
1984–85	European Cup Winners' Cup	1. Round	(Finland)	FC Kuusysi	2–1	0–0	2–1
1984–85	European Cup Winners' Cup	2. Round	(England)	Everton	0–1	0–3	0–4
1988–89	European Cup Winners' Cup	1. Round	(Bulgaria)	CSKA Sofia	2–3	0–5	2–8
1990–91	UEFA Cup	1. Round	(Luxembourg)	Avenir Beggen	5–0	1–2	6–2
1990–91	UEFA Cup	2. Round	(Germany)	1. FC Köln	0–2	1–0	1–2
1994–95	UEFA Cup	Preliminary round	(Finland)	MYPA	0–3	1–0	1–3
1995–96	UEFA Cup Winners' Cup	Qualifying round	(Malta)	Valletta F.C.	5–2	0–0	5–2
1995–96	UEFA Cup Winners' Cup	1. Round	(Spain)	Real Zaragoza	0–2	1–3	1–5
1998–99	UEFA Cup	1. Qualifying round	(Albania)	KF Tirana	2–0	2–0	4–0
1998–99	UEFA Cup	2. Qualifying round	(Czech Republic)	Slavia Prague	2–0	0–4	2–4
1999–00	UEFA Cup	Qualifying round	(Albania)	KS Bylis	3–1	2–0	5–1
1999–00	UEFA Cup	1. Round	(Austria)	Rapid Wien	1–0	2–1	3–1
1999–00	UEFA Cup	2. Round	(France)	FC Nantes	0–3	0–4	0–7
2000–01	UEFA Champions League	2. Qualifying round	(Finland)	FC Haka	1–0(aet)	0–0	1–0
2000–01	UEFA Champions League	3. Qualifying round	(France)	Olympique Lyonnais	1–2	1–2	2–4
2000–01	UEFA Cup	1. Round	(Netherlands)	Roda JC Kerkrade	2–1	2–0	4–1
2000–01	UEFA Cup	2. Round	(Russia)	Lokomotiv Moscow	1–2	0–1	1–3
2001–02	UEFA Champions League	2. Qualifying round	(Belarus)	Slavia Mozyr	1–0	1–0	2–0
2001–02	UEFA Champions League	3. Qualifying round	(Norway)	Rosenborg	3–3	0–4	3–7
2001–02	UEFA Cup	1. Round	(Bulgaria)	Litex Lovech	1–0	0–3	1–3

== Player records ==
=== Most goals ===
#	Nat.	Name	Goals
1	(Czechoslovakia)	Jozef Levický	100
2	(Czechoslovakia)	Adolf Scherer	99
3	(Czechoslovakia) (Slovakia)	Ľubomír Luhový	76
.	(Czechoslovakia)	Milan Dolinský	76
5	(Czechoslovakia)	Ladislav Petráš	65
6	(Czechoslovakia)	Juraj Szikora	56
7	(Czechoslovakia)	Mikuláš Krnáč	51
8	(Czechoslovakia)	Marián Tomčák	48
9	(Czechoslovakia)	Titus Buberník	47
.	(Czechoslovakia)	Ladislav Kačáni	47

=== Czechoslovak and Slovak Top Goalscorer ===
The Czechoslovak League top scorer from 1944 to 1945 until 1992–93. Since the 1993–94 Slovak League Top scorer.

Year	Winner	G
1961–62	(Czechoslovakia) Adolf Scherer	24
1974–75	(Czechoslovakia) Ladislav Petráš	20
1989–90	(Czechoslovakia) Ľubomír Luhový	20
1999–00	(Slovakia) Szilárd Németh	16
2000–01	(Slovakia) Szilárd Németh	23

^{1}Shared award

== Notable players ==
Had international caps for their respective countries. Players whose name is listed in bold represented their countries while playing for Inter.

Past (and present) players who are the subjects of Wikipedia articles can be found here.

- (Slovakia) **Peter Babnič**
- (Czechoslovakia) **Jozef Barmoš**
- (Czechoslovakia) **Titus Buberník**
- (Czechoslovakia) Ján Čapkovič
- (Slovakia) Marek Čech
- (Czechoslovakia) Jaroslav Červeňan
- (Slovakia) Erik Čikoš
- (Slovakia) **Marián Čišovský**
- (Slovakia) **Juraj Czinege**
- (Slovakia) Marián Dirnbach
- (Czechoslovakia) **Milan Dolinský**
- (Slovakia) **Miroslav Drobňák**
- (Slovakia) **Peter Dzúrik**
- (Czechoslovakia) (Slovakia) Peter Fieber
- (Czechoslovakia) **Kazimír Gajdoš**
- (Slovakia) Vratislav Greško
- (Slovakia) Juraj Halenár
- (Czechoslovakia) Ján Hlavatý
- (Slovakia) **Zsolt Hornyák**
- (Slovakia) David Hrnčár
- (Slovakia) **Miroslav Hýll**
- (Curaçao) Quintón Christina
- (Czechoslovakia) **Justín Javorek**
- (Slovakia) **Bartolomej Juraško**
- (Czechoslovakia) **Ladislav Jurkemik**
- (Czechoslovakia) **Ladislav Kačáni**
- (Democratic Republic of the Congo) Steve Kapuadi
- (Slovakia) Filip Kiss
- (Slovakia) Tomáš Košický
- (Czechoslovakia) **Jaroslav Košnar**
- (Slovakia) **Roman Kratochvíl**
- (Slovakia) Marek Krejčí
- (Czechoslovakia) **Mikuláš Krnáč**
- (Austria) Rolf Landerl
- (Bulgaria) (Czechoslovakia) **Bozhin Laskov**
- (Czechoslovakia) **Jozef Levický**
- (Central African Republic) Alias Lembakoali
- (Czechoslovakia) (Slovakia) **Ľubomír Luhový**
- (Czechoslovakia) **Štefan Matlák**
- (Slovakia) Milan Malatinský
- (Czechoslovakia) Jozef Móder
- (Czechoslovakia) (Slovakia) **Ladislav Molnár**
- (Czechoslovakia) **Pavol Molnár**
- (Slovakia) **Stanislav Moravec**
- (Czechoslovakia) **Gustáv Mráz**
- (Czechoslovakia) **Peter Mráz**
- (Slovakia) Ján Mucha
- (Slovakia) **Peter Németh**
- (Slovakia) **Szilárd Németh**
- (Czechoslovakia) **Anton Obložinský**
- (Slovakia) **Martin Obšitník**
- (Slovakia) Michal Pančík
- (Czechoslovakia) **Ladislav Pavlovič**
- (Slovakia) Mário Pečalka
- (Czechoslovakia) **Ladislav Petráš**
- (Slovakia) Peter Petráš
- (Slovakia) **Attila Pinte**
- (Czechoslovakia) Lubomír Pokluda
- (Slovakia) Andrej Porázik
- (Slovakia) Erik Prekop
- (Niger) Siradji Sani
- (Czechoslovakia) **Adolf Scherer**
- (Slovakia) Ivan Schranz
- (Slovakia) **Ján Solár**
- (Slovakia) Filip Šebo
- (Slovakia) Pavol Sedlák
- (Slovakia) Ondrej Šmelko
- (Slovakia) **Marián Šuchančok**
- (Slovakia) Michal Šulla
- (Slovakia) Kamil Susko
- (Czechoslovakia) **Juraj Szikora**
- (Czechoslovakia) **Jiří Tichý**
- (Slovakia) Ivan Trabalík
- (Slovakia) Rudolf Urban
- (Slovakia) Jozef Valachovič
- (Czechoslovakia) **Vladimír Weiss**
- (Czechoslovakia) (Slovakia) **Vladimír Weiss sr.**
- (Slovakia) Vladimír Weiss jr.
- (Slovakia) Ľudovít Zlocha

== Managers ==
- (Hungary) József Ember (1953)
- (Czechoslovakia) František Kolman (1954–55)
- (Czechoslovakia) Theodor Reimann (1955–57)
- (Czechoslovakia) Karol Borhy (1958–1960)
- (Czechoslovakia) Arnošt Hložek (1962–1966)
- (Czechoslovakia) Ladislav Kačáni (1967–1970)
- (Czechoslovakia) Jozef Marko (1970–1972)
- (Czechoslovakia) František Skyva (1972)
- (Czechoslovakia) Valér Švec (1972–1978)
- (Czechoslovakia) Michal Vičan (1978–1980)
- (Czechoslovakia) Justín Javorek (1980–1982)
- (Czechoslovakia) Arnošt Hložek (1982–1984)
- (Czechoslovakia) Štefan Šimončič (1984)
- (Czechoslovakia) Michal Vičan (1984–1986)
- (Czechoslovakia) Karol Kögl (1986–1988)
- (Czechoslovakia) Vladimír Hrivnák (1988)
- (Czechoslovakia) Jozef Adamec (1989–1991)
- (Czechoslovakia) Jozef Jankech (1991–1992)
- (Slovakia) Jozef Adamec (1992–1993)
- (Slovakia) Ladislav Petráš (1994)
- (Czech Republic) Karel Brückner (1995)
- (Slovakia) Jozef Adamec (1995)
- (Slovakia) Jozef Valovič (1996)
- (Slovakia) Jozef Bubenko (1996–2002)
- (Slovakia) Jozef Valovič (1996)
- (Slovakia) Jozef Bubenko (1996–2002)
- (Slovakia) Jozef Barmoš (2004–2005)
- (Slovakia) Ladislav Jurkemik (2006–2008)
- (Slovakia) Vladimír Koník (2007–2009)
- (Slovakia) Peter Fieber (2009)
- (Slovakia) Jozef Barmoš (2009–2016)
- (Slovakia) Richard Slezák (2016–2017)
- (Slovakia) Jozef Barmoš (2017)
- (Slovakia) Jozef Brezovský (2018)
- (Slovakia) Miroslav Jantek (2018–2019)
- (Slovakia) Michal Pančík (2019–2021)
- (Slovakia) Ladislav Hudec (2022)
- (Slovakia) Andrej Štellár (2023-2025)
- (Slovakia) Marián Šarmír (2025-2026)
- (Slovakia) Vladimír Cifranič (2026-)
