= Partizán Bardejov =

Slovak football team

- Full name: Partizán Bardejov
- Founded: February 12, 1922; 104 years ago (as ŠK Bardejov)
- Ground: Mestský štadión Bardejov, Bardejov
- Capacity: 3,435
- President: Stanislav Soroka
- Head coach: Jozef Kostelník
- League: 3. liga
- 2025–26: 4. liga, 1st (promoted)
- Website: https://www.partizanbj.sk
Home colours	Away colours

Partizán Bardejov is a Slovak professional football team, based in the town of Bardejov. The club was founded in 1922. The club currently plays in the 4. liga, the fourth tier of the Slovak league system, hosting games at the 3,040-capacity Mestský štadión Bardejov.

== History ==
The first club in Bardejov was founded on 12 February 1922 as BSC Bardejov. its first president was Július Grofčík. On 18 June 1922, BSC Bardejov played its first game at their own stadium against ETVE Prešov. BSC Bardejov lost 1 – 4. Mikuláš Chavko was the first player from Bardejov, who started in the highest football level in Czechoslovakia. He played for I.ČsŠK Bratislava. Ján Chavko played for Italian side Palermo since 1947. A World cup 1962 participant Jozef Bomba played in 1964, for choice of Europe.

=== Clubname history ===
1. 1932 – ŠK Bardejov
2. 1949 – Sokol OSK Bardejov
3. 1951 – Sokol ČSSZ Bardejov
4. 1953 – Slavoj Bardejov
5. 1962 – TJ Partizán Bardejov
6. 1992 – BSC JAS Bardejov
7. 2008 – Partizán Bardejov
8. 2019 – NFL Partizán Bardejov
9. 2019 – Partizán Bardejov BŠK

== Honours ==
- Slovak Second Division (1993–)
  - Winners (1): 1993–94

== Stadium ==
The team plays their home games at the Mestský štadión Bardejov which opened in 1966 and holds 3,040 Partizán supporters. In 2012 Partizán Bardejov had renovated the stadium due arrangement final match of 2012 Slovnaft Cup, between FK Senica and MŠK Žilina.

== Recent seasons ==
Slovak League only (1993–present)

Year	Division (Name)	Position	Slovak Cup	Top scorer/Goals
1993–1994	(II) 1. liga	1st (promoted)	Round 3	
1994–1995	(I) Mars superliga	7th	Round 1	(Slovakia) Jozef Urblík (11)
1995–1996	(I) Mars superliga	6th	Round 2	(Slovakia) Jozef Hrivňák (8)
1996–1997	(I) Mars superliga	7th	Round 2	
1997–1998	(I) Mars superliga	14th	Quarter-finals	(Slovakia) Marián Ľalík (5) (Slovakia) Ľubomír Jacko (5)
1998–1999	(I) Mars superliga	16th (relegated)	Quarter-finals	(Slovakia) Marián Ľalík (4)
1999–2000	(II) 1. liga	6th	Round 1	(Slovakia) Ľubomír Pagor (13)
2000–2001	(II) 1. liga	13th (relegated)	Round 1	
2001–2002	(III) 2. liga	–	Semi-finals	
2002–2003	–	–		
2003–2004	–	–		
2004–2005	–	–		
2005–2006	–	–		
2006–2007	–	–		
2007–2008	–	–		
2008–2009	–	–		
2009–2010	(IV) 3. liga	1st (promoted)		
2010–2011	(III) 2. liga	2nd	Round 1	
2011–12	(III) 3. liga	1st (promoted)	Round 1	
2012–13	(II) 2. liga	4th	Round 3	(Slovakia) Marek Seman (8)
2013–14	(II) 2. liga	2nd	Round 2	(Brazil) Dyjan (10)
2014–15	(II) DOXXbet liga	6th	Round 4	(Slovakia) Ján Zápotoka (15)
2015–16	(II) DOXXbet liga	5th	Round 2	(Serbia) Marko Milunović (19)
2016–17	(II) DOXXbet liga	8th	Round 3	(Slovakia) Michal Hamuľak (17)
2017–18	(II) DOXXbet liga	12th	Round 3	(Slovakia) Michal Hamuľak (20)
2018–19	(II) 2. Liga	10th	Round 5	(Serbia) Marko Milunović (7)
2019–20	(II) 2. Liga	11th	Round 4	(Slovakia) Michal Horodník (5)
2020–21	(II) 2. Liga	13th	Round 3	?
2021–2022	(II) 2. Liga	15th (relegated)	Round 2	(Slovakia) Adam Brenkus (4) (Serbia) Mihailo Cmiljanović (4) (Brazil) Lopez Da Silva Junior (4)
2022–23	(III) 3. Liga	8th	Round 2	(Russia) Saveliy Somov (13)
2023–24	(III) 3. Liga	14th	Round 3	(Slovakia) Jakub Štefančin (5) (Slovakia) Šimon Stachura (5) (Slovakia) Michal Berecký (5)
2024–25	(III) 3. Liga	16th (relegated)	Round 4	(Nigeria) Sodiq Aremu (7)
2025–26	(IV) 4. Liga	1st (promoted)	Round 4	(Cameroon) Boris Toube (12) (Slovakia) Samuel Sopko (12)

== Current squad ==
As of 22 June 2023. Note: Flags indicate national team as defined under FIFA eligibility rules; some limited exceptions apply. Players may hold more than one non-FIFA nationality.

No.	Pos.	Nation	Player
—	GK	SVK	Ján Čikoš-Pavličko
—	DF	SVK	Ondrej Elexa
—	DF	SVK	Michal Berecký
—	DF	SVK	Jaroslav Kmec
—	DF	BRA	Pedro Da Silva
—	MF	SVK	Vladimír Pyda

No.	Pos.	Nation	Player
—	MF	SVK	Sebastián Borok
—	MF	SVK	Dávid Haščák
—	MF	RUS	Artem Venediktov
—	MF	SVK	Nikolas Lukáč
—	FW	RUS	Saveliy Somov
—	FW	SVK	Marko Lukáč

For recent transfers, see List of Slovak football transfers winter 2021–22.

=== Out on loan 2021–22 ===
Note: Flags indicate national team as defined under FIFA eligibility rules; some limited exceptions apply. Players may hold more than one non-FIFA nationality.

No.	Pos.	Nation	Player

== Current technical staff ==
As of 11 July 2022

Staff	Job title
(Slovakia) Rastislav Kica	Manager
(Slovakia) Ľubomír Čekan	Assistant manager
(Slovakia) Štefan Tarcala	Team leader
(Slovakia) Bartolomej Majerník	Goalkeeping coach
(Slovakia) Pavol Kendra	Masseur
(Slovakia) Ivan Krukhovskyi	Team doctor

== Notable players ==
Had international caps for their respective countries. Players whose name is listed in bold represented their countries while playing for Partizán.

Past (and present) players who are the subjects of Wikipedia articles can be found here.

- (Czechoslovakia) Bohumil Andrejko
- (Czechoslovakia) Jozef Bomba
- (Slovakia) Juraj Čobej
- (Czechoslovakia) Anton Flešár
- (Curaçao) Quintón Christina
- (Slovakia) Marek Kaščák
- (Czechoslovakia) Mikuláš Komanický
- (Slovakia) Marián Kurty
- (Slovakia) Jozef Pisár
- (Haiti) Emmanuel Sarki
- (Slovakia) Anton Šoltis
- (Slovakia) Marián Šuchančok
- (Slovakia) Blažej Vaščák

== Notable managers ==
- (Slovakia) Bohumil Andrejko
- (Slovakia) Mikuláš Komanický (1997–1998)
- (Slovakia) Jozef Kukulský (2000–2011)
- (Slovakia) Mikuláš Komanický (2011–2012)
- (Slovakia) Jozef Bubenko (2013)
- (Slovakia) Rastislav Kica (2013–2015)
- (Slovakia) Jozef Kukulský (2015–2017)
- (Poland) Ryszard Kuźma (2017–2018)
- (Slovakia) Jozef Danko (2018)
- (Slovakia) Roman Berta (2018–2019)
- (Slovakia) Miroslav Jantek (2019)
- (Slovakia) Branislav Benko (2019)
- (Slovakia) Jozef Kukulský (2020)
- (Belgium) Hajrudin Nuhic (2020)
- (North Macedonia) Bobi Stojkovski (2021)
- (Slovakia) Marián Šarmír (2021–2022)
- (Slovakia) Jaroslav Galko (2022)
- (Slovakia) Rastislav Kica (2022–2024)
- (Slovakia) Jozef Kukulský (2024–2025)
- (Slovakia) Vladislav Palša (2025–2026)
- (Slovakia) Jozef Kostelník (2026–present)

== Women's team ==
The women's team was founded in 2012 and first played in 2012–13. In 2016–17 the team won the Slovak Women's First League. Also the Slovak Women's Cup was won in 2016, 2017 and 2019.
