= MŠK Rimavská Sobota =

Slovak football club

Rimavská Sobota
- Full name: MŠK Rimavská Sobota
- Founded: 1913; 113 years ago
- Ground: Na Zahradkach Stadium, Rimavská Sobota
- Capacity: 5,000
- President: Štefan Szántó
- Head coach: Eugen Bari
- League: 3. Liga "central"
- 2025–26: 3. liga "Stred", 7th
- Website: https://www.mskrimavskasobota.sk/
Home colours	Away colours

MŠK Rimavská Sobota is a Slovak football team, based in the town of Rimavská Sobota. The team currently plays in the 3. liga, the third tier of Slovak football.

== Affiliated clubs ==
The following clubs are affiliated with MŠK Rimavská Sobota:

- (Hungary) Diósgyőri VTK (2018–)

== Honours ==
=== Domestic ===
- Slovak Second Division (1993–)
  - Winners (1): 2003–04
  - Runners-Up (1): 2010–11

== European competition history ==
Season	Competition	Round	Country	Club	Home	Away	Aggregate
1998	Intertoto	1	(Northern Ireland)	Omagh Town F.C.	1–0	2–2	3–2
1998	Intertoto	2	(Italy)	Sampdoria	0–2	1–0	1–2

== Sponsorship ==
Period	Kit manufacturer	Shirt sponsor
1998–2003	Puma	TAURIS
2003–2005	Legea	TAURIS
2005–2007	Uhlsport	TAURIS
2007–2009	Diadora	none
2009–2010	Jako	none
2010–?	Diadora	none
2013–present	Givova	CLIPtec

== Notable players ==
Had international caps for their respective countries. Players whose name is listed in bold represented their countries while playing for MŠK. For full list, see here

- (Slovakia) Martin Dobrotka
- (Slovakia) Krisztián Németh
- (Slovakia) Attila Pinte
- (Slovakia) Jozef Pisár
- (Slovakia) Pavol Sedlák
- (Slovakia) Lukáš Tesák

== Notable managers ==
- (Hungary) Antal Mally (1948)
- (Slovakia) Ladislav Jurkemik (1997–98)
- (Slovakia) František Vas (1998–1999)
- (Slovakia) Vladimír Goffa (2002–2003)
- (Slovakia) Mikuláš Komanický (2005–2007)
- (Slovakia) Karol Praženica (2013–2014)
- (Slovakia) Gergely Geri (2014–2016)
- (Slovakia) Vladimír Goffa (2016)
- (Slovakia) Csaba Csányi (2016–2017)
- (Slovakia) Eugen Bari (2019)
- (Slovakia) Tomáš Boháčik (2019–2021)
- (Slovakia) Eugen Bari (01/2022–05/2024)
- (Ukraine) Volodymyr Vasylyev (05/2024-09/2024)
- (Slovakia) Peter Petrán (09/2024-)
