= TJ OFC Gabčíkovo =

OFC Russel Gabčíkovo
- Full name: OFC Russel Gabčíkovo
- Founded: 1923
- Dissolved: 2016
- Ground: TJ OFC Gabčíkovo, Gabčíkovo
- President: Győrgy Csőrgő
- Head coach: Jozef Olejník
- 2014–15: 3rd
- Website: http://www.ofcrusselgabcikovo.sk

OFC Russel Gabčíkovo was a Slovak football team, based in the town of Gabčíkovo. The club was founded in 1923. In February 2013, the club was renamed OFK Russel Gabčíkovo, due to the club's new sponsor.

In 2016, the club was dissolved due to financial problems.

== Notable managers ==
- (Slovakia) Marián Süttö (−2013)
- (Slovakia) Tibor Szaban (2013)
- (Slovakia) Ľubomír Luhový (2013–2015)
- (Slovakia) Mikuláš Radványi (2015)
- (Slovakia) Jozef Olejník (2015–2016)
