= 2016–17 2. Liga (Slovakia) =

DOXXbet liga
- Season: 2016–17
- Champions: FC VSS Košice
- Promoted: FC Nitra
- Relegated: Spartak Trnava II; Slovan Bratislava II; FK Dukla Banská Bystrica; ŠK Svätý Jur; MŠK Fomat Martin; MŠK Rimavská Sobota; ŠK Odeva Lipany; FK Haniska
- Top goalscorer: Peu (23 goals)

The 2016–17 2. Liga season, named DOXXbet liga due to sponsorship reasons, was the 22nd edition of the second tier Slovak league system football annual competition in Slovakia, since its establishment in 1993.

For the third time in its history (and for now the last time), teams will compete in two groups, with top six sides from each of group advanced to a further round and all other teams played in relegation groups. From the 2017–18 season, 2. Liga will feature 16 teams playing in nationwide group.

== Changes from last season ==
In Eastern group will play only 10 teams.

=== Team changes ===
- 1. FC Tatran Prešov were promoted to the Slovak First Football League after the 2015–16 season.
- MFK Skalica were relegated from the Slovak First Football League after the 2015–16 season.
- ŠK Svätý Jur, FC ŠTK 1914 Šamorín, MŠK Fomat Martin, ŠK Odeva Lipany were promoted from the Slovak Third Football League after the 2015–16 season.
- MFK Dolný Kubín, FK Iskra Borčice, OFK Dunajská Lužná, FK Slovan Duslo Šaľa, ŠK Senec and OFK Teplička nad Váhom were relegated (or withdrew) during or after the 2015–16 season.

== Group West ==
=== Stadium and locations ===
Location of teams in Slovak 2. liga 2016–17

Team	Home city	Stadium	Capacity	2015–16 season
Dukla Banská Bystrica	Banská Bystrica	SNP Stadium	10,000	1st in 2. liga (Play-out West)
FC Nitra	Nitra	Stadium pod Zoborom	11,384	7th in 2. liga
ŠK Svätý Jur	Svätý Jur	Stadium ŠK Svätý Jur	550	1st in 3. liga (Bratislava)
Spartak Trnava juniori	Trnava	Stadium FK Lokomotíva Trnava	1,500	3rd in 2. liga (Play-out West)
FK Pohronie	Dolná Ždaňa	FK Pohronie Stadium	1,500	6th in 2. liga
MFK Skalica	Skalica	Mestský štadión Skalica	3,000	12th in Fortuna Liga
ŠTK 1914 Šamorín	Šamorín	Pomlé Stadium	1,950	1st in 3. liga (West)
ŠKF Sereď	Sereď	Stadium ŠKF Sereď	5,800	10th in 2. liga
AFC Nové Mesto nad Váhom	Nové Mesto nad Váhom	Mestský štadión NMnV	2,500	2nd in 2. liga (Play-out West)
Slovan Bratislava B	Bratislava	Stadium Rapid - Prievoz	5,000	11th in 2. liga
MŠK Žilina B	Žilina	Stadium pod Dubňom	11,181	8th in 2. liga
Fomat Martin	Martin	Stadium Mestský športový	1,200	1st in 3. liga (Middle)

=== Personnel and kits ===
Team	Head coach	Captain	Kit manufacturer	Shirt sponsor
Skalica	(Slovakia) Jozef Kostelník	(Slovakia) Pavol Majerník	Nike	
Martin	(Slovakia) Jozef Šiňo	(Slovakia) Andrej Romančík	Joma	
Nové Mesto nad Váhom	(Slovakia) Dušan Kramlík	(Slovakia) Pavol Šupka	Adidas	Heraldik Slovakia
Šamorín	(Finland) Mika Lönnström	(Slovakia) Csaba Horváth	Adidas	
Žilina II	(Slovakia) Jaroslav Kentoš	(Bosnia and Herzegovina) Nermin Haskić	Nike	Preto
Svätý Jur	(Slovakia) Stanislav Ďuriš	(Slovakia) Stanislav Angelovič	Nike	
Sereď	(Slovakia) Marián Süttö	(Slovakia) Adam Morong	Nike	TT Pharma
Nitra	(Slovakia) Ivan Galád	(Slovakia) Márius Charizopulos	Jako	Mesto Nitra
Spartak Trnava juniori	(Slovakia) Marián Šarmír	(Slovakia) Martin Tóth	Adidas	ŽOS Trnava
Dukla Banská Bystrica	(Slovakia) Dušan Tóth	(Serbia) Saša Savić	Adidas	
Slovan Bratislava juniori	(Slovakia) Ján Kozák	(Slovakia) Adam Laczkó	Adidas	Niké
Pohronie	(Slovakia) Miloš Foltán	(Slovakia) Jozef Sekereš	Adidas	

=== League table ===
Pos	Team	Pld	W	D	L	GF	GA	GD	Pts	Qualification
1	Skalica	22	14	5	3	38	12	+26	47	Qualification for Championship round
2	Sereď	22	14	3	5	50	23	+27	45	Qualification for Championship round
3	Šamorín	22	12	5	5	37	21	+16	41	Qualification for Championship round
4	Žilina B	22	11	6	5	47	26	+21	39	Qualification for Championship round
5	Nitra	22	12	3	7	45	27	+18	39	Qualification for Championship round
6	Pohronie	22	11	3	8	29	30	−1	36	Qualification for Championship round
7	Spartak Trnava juniori	22	10	5	7	39	34	+5	35	Qualification for Relegation round
8	Nové Mesto nad Váhom	22	8	8	6	29	23	+6	32	Qualification for Relegation round
9	Dukla Banská Bystrica	22	3	5	14	19	43	−24	14	Qualification for Relegation round
10	Svätý Jur	22	4	2	16	19	50	−31	14	Qualification for Relegation round
11	Slovan Bratislava B	22	3	5	14	19	48	−29	14	Qualification for Relegation round
12	Martin	22	2	6	14	22	56	−34	12	Qualification for Relegation round

Source: Futbalnet (in Slovak)
Rules for classification: 1) points; 2) goal difference; 3) number of goals scored.

== Group East ==
=== Stadium and locations ===
Location of teams in Slovak DOXXbet liga 2016–17

Team	Home city	Stadium	Capacity	2015–16 season
Partizán Bardejov	Bardejov	Stadium mestský Bardejov	3,040	5th in 2. liga
Rimavská Sobota	Rimavská Sobota	Na Záhradkách Stadium	5,000	5th in 2. liga (Play-out East)
VSS Košice	Košice	Štadión Lokomotívy v Čermeli	9,000	3rd in 2. liga
FK Haniska	Haniska	Stadium FK Haniska	1,000	2nd in 2. liga (Play-out East)
Tatran Liptovský Mikuláš	Liptovský Mikuláš	Stadium Liptovský Mikuláš	1,950	2nd in 2. liga
Zvolen	Zvolen	MFK Lokomotíva Zvolen Stadium	1,870	9th in 2. liga (Championship)
FK Poprad	Poprad	NTC Poprad	5,070	1st in 2. liga (Play out-East)
FK Spišská Nová Ves	Spišská Nová Ves	Stadium Mestský (Lokomotíva)	10,000	4th in 2. liga (Play-out East)
Lokomotíva Košice	Košice	Stadium Družstevná pri Hornáde	600	4th in 2. liga (Championship)
ŠK Odeva Lipany	Lipany	Stadium ŠK Odeva Lipany	4,000	2nd in 3. liga (East)

=== Personnel and kits ===
Team	Head coach	Captain	Kit manufacturer	Shirt sponsor
VSS Košice	(Slovakia) Jozef Majoroš	(Slovakia) František Vancák	Jako	Steel Trans
Lipany	(Slovakia) Emil Jacko	(Slovakia) Ivan Pončák	Zeus	Odeva
Lokomotíva Košice	(Slovakia) Albert Rusnák	(Slovakia) Patrik Zajac	Jako	
Liptovský Mikuláš	(Slovakia) Jozef Majoroš	(Slovakia) Ivan Lišivka	Sportika SA	VEREX
Bardejov	(Slovakia) Jozef Kukulský	(Slovakia) Vladimír Andraščík	Adidas	Bardenergy
Zvolen	(Slovakia) Anton Jánoš	(Slovakia) Jozef Čertík	Luanvi	IKM
Poprad	(Slovakia) Stanislav Šesták	(Slovakia) Vladislav Palša	Adidas	Ritro
Spišská Nová Ves	(Slovakia) Branislav Ondáš	(Slovakia) Radoslav Sirko	Sportika SA	Noves
Rimavská Sobota	(Slovakia) Ladislav Danyi	(Slovakia) Peter Petrán	Givova	
Haniska	(Slovakia) Jaroslav Galko	(Slovakia) Matúš Horváth	Jako	VEMI

=== League table ===
Pos	Team	Pld	W	D	L	GF	GA	GD	Pts	Qualification
1	VSS Košice	18	15	2	1	28	7	+21	47	Qualification for Championship round
2	Lokomotíva Košice	18	10	2	6	41	25	+16	32	Qualification for Championship round
3	Bardejov	18	10	2	6	28	17	+11	32	Qualification for Championship round
4	Liptovský Mikuláš	18	9	4	5	28	17	+11	31	Qualification for Championship round
5	Spišská Nová Ves	18	9	0	9	34	33	+1	27	Qualification for Championship round
6	Zvolen	18	7	5	6	26	23	+3	26	Qualification for Championship round
7	Poprad	18	6	8	4	26	17	+9	26	Qualification for Relegation round
8	Haniska	18	2	6	10	24	49	−25	12	Qualification for Relegation round
9	Rimavská Sobota	18	2	4	12	10	30	−20	10	Qualification for Relegation round
10	Lipany	18	2	3	13	11	38	−27	9	Qualification for Relegation round

Source: Futbalnet (in Slovak)
Rules for classification: 1) points; 2) goal difference; 3) number of goals scored.

== Championship round ==
Teams will carry over all points and goals from regular season, but records against the two last-placed teams in Group West will be excluded.

=== League table ===
Pos	Team	Pld	W	D	L	GF	GA	GD	Pts	Promotion
1	VSS Košice (C)	30	19	4	7	40	27	+13	61	Withdrew from the league (Note: VSS Košice did not meet club license rules and they went into bankruptcy.)
2	Nitra (P)	30	18	5	7	57	32	+25	59	Promotion to Fortuna Liga
3	Skalica	30	17	7	6	45	19	+26	58	
4	Šamorín	30	16	7	7	45	28	+17	55	
5	Žilina B	30	15	6	9	70	44	+26	51	
6	Sereď	30	13	9	8	56	33	+23	48	
7	Lokomotíva Košice	30	13	8	9	56	42	+14	47	
8	Bardejov	30	14	4	12	48	39	+9	46	
9	Pohronie	30	14	4	12	42	44	−2	46	
10	Liptovský Mikuláš	30	13	6	11	43	36	+7	45	
11	Zvolen	30	9	8	13	38	45	−7	35	
12	Spišská Nová Ves	30	9	1	20	36	67	−31	28	

Source: Futbalnet (in Slovak)
Rules for classification: 1) points; 2) goal difference; 3) number of goals scored.
(C) Champions; (P) Promoted

== Relegation round ==
=== Group West ===
==== League table ====
Pos	Team	Pld	W	D	L	GF	GA	GD	Pts	Qualification or relegation
1	Spartak Trnava juniori (R)	30	16	5	9	58	43	+15	53	Qualification for Relegation play-offs
2	Nové Mesto nad Váhom	30	12	9	9	41	27	+14	45	
3	Slovan Bratislava B (R)	30	9	5	16	34	58	−24	32	Relegation to 3. Liga
4	Dukla Banská Bystrica (R)	30	8	6	16	33	55	−22	30	Relegation to 3. Liga
5	Svätý Jur (R)	30	5	4	21	26	65	−39	19	Relegation to 3. Liga
6	Martin (R)	30	2	6	22	26	77	−51	12	Relegation to 3. Liga

Source: Futbalnet (in Slovak)
Rules for classification: 1) points; 2) goal difference; 3) number of goals scored.
(R) Relegated

=== Group East ===
==== League table ====
Pos	Team	Pld	W	D	L	GF	GA	GD	Pts	Qualification or relegation
1	Poprad (O)	25	13	8	4	53	22	+31	47	Qualification for Relegation play-offs
2	Rimavská Sobota (R)	25	5	5	15	22	44	−22	20	Relegation to 3. Liga
3	Lipany (R)	25	5	4	16	23	54	−31	19	Relegation to 3. Liga
4	Haniska (R)	25	2	6	17	27	68	−41	12	Relegation to 3. Liga

Source: Futbalnet (in Slovak)
Rules for classification: 1) points; 2) goal difference; 3) number of goals scored.
(O) Play-off winners; (R) Relegated

== Relegation play-offs ==
Winner of the relegation play-offs remained in 2. Liga, the other relegated to 3. Liga.

=== First leg ===
3 June 2017
17:00 CEST

FK Poprad	4–1	Spartak Trnava juniori
Šesták 7', 65'; Palša 24'; Bilas 27'	Report	Tomovič 90' (pen.)

NTC Poprad, Poprad
Attendance: 1,452
Referee: Michal Očenáš

=== Second leg ===
10 June 2017
17:00 CEST

Spartak Trnava juniori	0–2	FK Poprad
	Report	Maťaš 50'; Šašinka 61'

Štadión TJ Slovan Červeník, Červeník
Attendance: 242
Referee: Ivan Kružliak

== Season statistics ==
=== Top goalscorers ===
Updated through matches played on 14 May 2017.

Rank	Player	Club	Goals
1	(Brazil) Peu	ŠTK 1914 Šamorín	21
2	(Slovakia) Róbert Jano	Lokomotíva Košice	20
2	(Slovakia) Filip Balaj	FC Nitra	20
4	(Slovakia) Michal Hamuľak	Partizán Bardejov	17
5	(Slovakia) Daniel Šebesta	MFK Skalica	16
6	(Brazil) Rômulo Silva Santos	Haniska (11)/Bardejov (4)	15
6	(Slovakia) Marek Frimmel	FK Pohronie	15
8	(Slovakia) Matúš Paukner	Sereď	14
9	(Slovakia) Lukáš Šebek	AFC Nové Mesto n. V.	13
10	(Ukraine) Illya Cherednychenko	Duslo Šala	12
10	(Slovakia) Radoslav Ďanovský	Martin	12

=== Hat-tricks ===
Round	Player	For	Against	Result	Date	Ref
2	(Slovakia) Lukáš Šebek	Nové Mesto n.V	Slovan B	6–2	7 August 2016	
3	(Slovakia) Daniel Rapavý	Nové Mesto n.V	Martin	1–5	13 August 2016	
5	(Slovakia) Róbert Jano^{5}	Lokomotíva	Lipany	8–0	2 September 2016	
13	(Bosnia and Herzegovina) Nermin Haskić^{4}	Žilina B	B.Bystrica	7–0	16 October 2016	
17	(Slovakia) Matúš Paukner	Trnava B	Sv.Jur	7–0	13 November 2016	
19	(Brazil) Peu	Šamorín	Trnava B	1–4	5 March 2017	
18	(Slovakia) Róbert Jano	Lokomotíva	FK Haniska	6–1	26 March 2017	
3 CH	(Slovakia) Michal Klec	MŠK Žilina B	VSS Košice	5–1	15 April 2017	
5 CH	(Brazil) Peu	Šamorín	Zvolen	3–2	29 April 2017	
8 R	(Slovakia) Stanislav Šesták^{4}	FK Poprad	FK Haniska	11–0	20 May 2017	
8 R	(Slovakia) Marko Lukáč	FK Poprad	FK Haniska	11–0	20 May 2017	
11 CH	(Slovakia) Patrik Blahút	FK Pohronie	Partizán Bardejov	5–3	28 May 2017	

Note

^{4} Player scored 4 goals ^{5} Player scored 5 goals

== See also ==
- 2016–17 Slovak First Football League
- 2016–17 3. Liga (Slovakia)

=== Stats ===
- List of transfers summer 2016
- List of transfers winter 2016-17
