= 2014–15 2. Liga (Slovakia) =

DOXXbet liga
- Season: 2014–15
- Champions: MFK Zemplín Michalovce
- Promoted: MFK Zemplín Michalovce; MFK Skalica
- Relegated: FC ŠTK 1914 Šamorín (West); MFK Dubnica (West); MFK Košice B (East); Moldava nad Bodvou (East); FK Slavoj Trebišov (East)
- Top goalscorer: Matúš Paukner (21 goals)

2014–15 2. Liga season, named DOXXbet liga due to sponsorship reasons, was the 22nd edition of the second tier Slovak league system football competition in Slovakia, since its establishment in 1993.

For the first time in history, twenty-four teams would contest in two groups, with top six sides from each of groups will advance to a further round.

== Changes from last season ==
=== Team changes ===
- ŽP Šport Podbrezová were promoted to the Slovak First Football League after the 2013–14 season.
- FC Nitra were relegated from the Slovak First Football League after the 2013–14 season.
- MŠK Žilina B, ŠKF Sereď, MFK Skalica, AFC Nové Mesto nad Váhom, ŠK Slovan Bratislava B, TJ Baník Ružiná, MFK Dolný Kubín, FK Poprad, MFK Košice B, FK Bodva Moldava nad Bodvou, FC Lokomotíva Košice and FK Slavoj Trebišov were promoted from the Slovak Third Football League after the 2013–14 season.

== Teams (Western Group) ==
=== Stadiums and locations ===
Location of teams in Slovak 2. liga 2014–15

Team	Home city	Stadium	Capacity	2013–14 season
FC Nitra	Nitra	Stadium pod Zoborom	5,050	12th in Corgoň Liga
ŠK Senec	Senec	NTC Stadium	3,264	5th in 2. liga
Spartak Trnava juniori	Trnava	Stadium FK Lokomotíva Trnava	1,500	6th in 2. liga
MFK Dubnica	Dubnica nad Váhom	Mestský štadión	5,450	8th in 2. liga
FK Pohronie	Dolná Ždaňa	FK Pohronie Stadium	1,500	9th in 2. liga
Slovan Duslo Šaľa	Šaľa	Šaľa Stadium	1,126	10th in 2. liga
FC Šamorín	Šamorín	Pomlé Stadium	1,950	11th in 2. liga
ŠKF Sereď	Sereď	Stadium ŠKF Sereď	5,800	1st in 3. liga (West)
MFK Skalica	Skalica	Mestský štadión Skalica	2,500	2nd in 3. liga (West)
AFC Nové Mesto nad Váhom	Nové Mesto nad Váhom	Mestský štadión NMnV	2,500	3rd in 3. liga (West)
Slovan Bratislava B	Bratislava	Stadium Rapid - Prievoz	5,000	4th in 3. liga (West)
MŠK Žilina B	Žilina	Stadium pod Dubňom	11,181	2nd in 3. liga (East)

=== Personnel and kits ===
Team	Head coach	Captain	Kit manufacturer	Shirt sponsor
Nitra	(Slovakia) Michal Hipp	(Slovakia) Marek Kostoláni	Jako	Mesto Nitra
Senec	(Slovakia) Andrej Štellár	(Slovakia) Peter Polgár	Jako	Agrisem
Trnava B	(Slovakia) Pavol Bartoš	(Slovakia) Juraj Galba	Adidas	ZOŠ Trnava
Dubnica	(Slovakia) Juraj Bútora	(Slovakia) Adam Cisár	Joma	
Pohronie	(Slovakia) Štefan Zaťko	(Slovakia) Jozef Sekereš	Jako	Remeslo
Duslo Šaľa	(Slovakia) Ladislav Molnár	(Slovakia) Ján Čirik	Givova	DUSLO
Šamorín	(Slovakia) Michal Salenka	(Slovakia) Vladimír Pončák	Givova	
Sereď	(Slovakia) Tibor Meszlényi	(Slovakia) Kamil Vaško	Nike	
Skalica	(Slovakia) Štefan Horný	(Slovakia) Peter Vaško	Adidas	
Nové Mesto nad Váhom	(Slovakia) Vladimír Hyža	(Slovakia) Lukáš Šebek	Adidas	
Slovan B	(Slovakia) Jozef Majoroš	(Slovakia) Marcel Oravec	Adidas	Niké
Zilina B	(Slovakia) Miroslav Nemec	(Slovakia) Tomáš Ďurica	Nike	Preto

=== 2. Liga West ===
Pos	Team	Pld	W	D	L	GF	GA	GD	Pts	Qualification
1	Skalica	22	15	4	3	40	16	+24	49	Qualification for Championship round
2	Žilina B	22	13	2	7	43	33	+10	41	Qualification for Championship round
3	Nitra	22	12	4	6	39	22	+17	40	Qualification for Championship round
4	Sereď	22	11	6	5	39	22	+17	39	Qualification for Championship round
5	Šaľa	22	10	7	5	33	24	+9	37	Qualification for Championship round
6	Senec	22	9	7	6	28	21	+7	34	Qualification for Championship round
7	Pohronie	22	10	3	9	32	35	−3	33	Qualification for Relegation round
8	Slovan Bratislava B	22	7	5	10	18	30	−12	26	Qualification for Relegation round
9	Spartak Trnava juniori	22	5	5	12	20	35	−15	20	Qualification for Relegation round
10	Šamorín	22	4	7	11	21	34	−13	19	Qualification for Relegation round
11	Dubnica	22	3	6	13	25	42	−17	15	Qualification for Relegation round
12	Nové Mesto nad Váhom	22	3	4	15	15	39	−24	13	Qualification for Relegation round

Source: Soccerway
Rules for classification: 1) points; 2) goal difference; 3) number of goals scored.

== Teams (Eastern Group) ==
=== Stadium and locations ===
Location of teams in Slovak 2. liga 2014–15

Team	Home city	Stadium	Capacity	2013–14 season
Partizán Bardejov	Bardejov	Stadium mestský Bardejov	3,040	2nd in 2. liga
MFK Michalovce	Michalovce	Zemplin Stadium	4,440	3rd in 2. liga
Tatran Prešov	Prešov	1. FC Tatran Prešov stadium	5,418	4th in 2. liga
MŠK Rimavská Sobota	Rimavská Sobota	Na Záhradkách Stadium	1,970	7th in 2. liga
Tatran Liptovský Mikuláš	Liptovský Mikuláš	Stadium Liptovský Mikuláš	1,950	12th in 2. liga
Zvolen (merged with TJ Baník Ružiná)	Ružiná	TJ Baník Stadium	1,200	1st in 3. liga (East)
MFK Dolný Kubín	Dolný Kubín	Stadium MUDr. Ivan Chodák	1,950	3rd in 3. liga (East)
FK Poprad	Poprad	NTC Poprad	5,070	4th in 3. liga (East)
MFK Košice B	Košice	Stadium Barca	600	6th in 3. liga (East)
Bodva Moldava	Moldava nad Bodvou	Steel Slovakia aréna	2,500	7th in 3. liga (East)
Lokomotíva Košice	Košice	Stadium Družstevná pri Hornáde	600	8th in 3. liga (East)
Slavoj Trebišov	Trebišov	Stadium Slavoj Trebišov	3,000	9th in 3. liga (East)

=== Personnel and kits ===
Team	Head coach	Captain	Kit manufacturer	Shirt sponsor
Bardejov	(Slovakia) Rastislav Kica	(Slovakia) Vladislav Palša	Colo	Bardenergy
Michalovce	(Czech Republic) František Šturma	(Slovakia) Michal Gallo	Joma	Scorp
Prešov	(Slovakia) Stanislav Varga	(Slovakia) Michal Krajník	ATAK Sportswear	DÚHA
Rimavská Sobota	(Slovakia) Gergely Geri	(Serbia) Milomir Sivčević	Givova	CLIPtec
Liptovský Mikuláš	(Slovakia) Karol Praženica	(Slovakia) Ivan Lišivka	Sportika SA	VEREX
Zvolen	(Slovakia) Anton Jánoš	(Slovakia) Michal Rakovan	Luanvi	
Dolný Kubín	(Slovakia) Jozef Šino	(Slovakia) Michal Drengubiak	Legea	
Poprad	(Slovakia) Vladimír Lajčák	(Slovakia) Matúš Bendík	Adidas	
MFK Košice B	(Slovakia) Marek Fabuľa	(Slovakia) Mikuláš Tóth	Jako	Steel Trans
Moldava nad Bodvou	(Slovakia) Karol Kisel	(Slovakia) Marek Petričko	Jako	Steel Slovakia
Lokomotíva Košice	(Slovakia) Jaroslav Galko	(Slovakia) Jakub Giertl	Jako, Colo	McCarter
Trebišov	(Slovakia) Vladimír Rusnák	(Slovakia) Jaroslav Capko	Colo	ZAPA beton

=== 2. Liga East ===
Pos	Team	Pld	W	D	L	GF	GA	GD	Pts	Qualification
1	Michalovce	22	16	3	3	46	11	+35	51	Qualification for Championship round
2	Zvolen	22	10	9	3	35	14	+21	39	Qualification for Championship round
3	Bardejov	22	10	9	3	36	17	+19	39	Qualification for Championship round
4	Prešov	22	11	5	6	39	22	+17	38	Qualification for Championship round
5	Liptovský Mikuláš	22	11	4	7	31	18	+13	37	Qualification for Championship round
6	Poprad	22	8	4	10	31	37	−6	28	Qualification for Championship round
7	Rimavská Sobota	22	7	7	8	21	28	−7	28	Qualification for Relegation round
8	Lokomotíva Košice	22	6	6	10	30	36	−6	24	Qualification for Relegation round
9	Dolný Kubín	22	7	2	13	21	40	−19	23	Qualification for Relegation round
10	Košice B	22	5	6	11	30	40	−10	21	Qualification for Relegation round
11	Moldava	22	4	7	11	18	37	−19	19	Qualification for Relegation round
12	Trebišov	22	4	4	14	13	51	−38	16	Qualification for Relegation round

Source: Soccerway
Rules for classification: 1) points; 2) goal difference; 3) number of goals scored.

== Play-offs ==
=== Championship round ===
==== League table ====
Pos	Team	Pld	W	D	L	GF	GA	GD	Pts	Promotion
1	Michalovce (C, P)	22	15	6	1	40	11	+29	51	Promotion to Fortuna Liga
2	Skalica (P)	22	15	3	4	32	15	+17	48	Promotion to Fortuna Liga
3	Prešov	22	10	6	6	32	24	+8	36	
4	Liptovský Mikuláš	22	9	6	7	29	23	+6	33	
5	Nitra	22	8	7	7	26	25	+1	31	
6	Bardejov	22	7	7	8	27	24	+3	28	
7	Zvolen	22	7	7	8	23	20	+3	28	
8	Žilina B	22	8	2	12	26	36	−10	26	
9	Senec	22	6	7	9	18	28	−10	25	
10	Sereď	22	6	4	12	27	38	−11	22	
11	Šaľa	22	4	8	10	27	40	−13	20	
12	Poprad	22	5	1	16	26	49	−23	16	

Source: Soccerway
Rules for classification: 1) points; 2) goal difference; 3) number of goals scored.
(C) Champions; (P) Promoted

=== Relegation round ===
==== League table (West) ====
Pos	Team	Pld	W	D	L	GF	GA	GD	Pts	Relegation
1	Pohronie	32	18	4	10	56	45	+11	58	
2	Slovan Bratislava B	32	11	6	15	40	47	−7	39	
3	Spartak Trnava juniori	32	9	7	16	37	49	−12	34	
4	Nové Mesto nad Váhom	32	8	6	18	27	48	−21	30	
5	Šamorín (R)	32	7	8	17	28	52	−24	29	Relegation to 3. Liga
6	Dubnica (Note: MFK Dubnica was docked 6 points for non–payment obligations.) (R)	32	4	9	19	31	62	−31	15	Relegation to 3. Liga

Source: Soccerway
Rules for classification: 1) points; 2) goal difference; 3) number of goals scored.
(R) Relegated

==== League table (East) ====
Pos	Team	Pld	W	D	L	GF	GA	GD	Pts	Relegation
1	Lokomotíva Košice	32	13	7	12	51	46	+5	46	
2	Rimavská Sobota	32	11	8	13	34	39	−5	41	
3	Dolný Kubín	32	12	4	16	36	47	−11	40	
4	Košice B (Note: MFK Košice did not obtain a licence for the 2015–16 season and therefore MFK Košice "B" can not play in the same league) (R)	32	10	7	15	45	50	−5	37	Relegation to 3. Liga
5	Moldava (R)	32	8	9	15	31	52	−21	33	Relegation to 3. Liga
6	Trebišov (R)	32	5	5	22	19	81	−62	20	Relegation to 3. Liga

Source: Soccerway
Rules for classification: 1) points; 2) goal difference; 3) number of goals scored.
(R) Relegated

=== Top goalscorers ===
Updated through matches played on 1. June 2015.

Rank	Player	Club	Goals
1	(Slovakia) Matúš Paukner	FC Nitra	21
2	(Spain) Samuel Bayón	Michalovce	18
3	(Slovakia) Adam Morong	Sered	17
3	(Slovakia) Ľubomír Ulrich	Skalica	17
5	(Slovakia) Tomáš Labun	Lokomotiva Kosice	16
6	(Slovakia) Lukáš Kubus	Poprad	15
6	(Slovakia) Ján Zápotoka	Bardejov	15
6	(Slovakia) Patrik Abrahám	FK Pohronie	15

== See also ==
- 2014–15 Slovak First Football League
- 2014–15 3. Liga (Slovakia)

=== Stats ===
- List of transfers summer 2014
