= 2015–16 2. Liga (Slovakia) =

DOXXbet liga
- Season: 2015–16
- Champions: 1. FC Tatran Prešov
- Promoted: 1. FC Tatran Prešov
- Relegated: OFK Dunajská Lužná; FK Slovan Duslo Šaľa; ŠK Senec
- Top goalscorer: Marko Milunović (19 goals)

The 2015–16 2. Liga (Slovakia) season, named DOXXbet liga due to sponsorship reasons, was the 23rd edition of the second tier Slovak league system annual football competition in Slovakia, since its establishment in 1993.

For the second time in its history, 24 teams contested in two groups, with the top six sides from each of group advanced to the next round.

== Changes from last season ==
=== Team changes ===
- MFK Zemplín Michalovce and MFK Skalica were promoted to the Slovak First Football League after the 2014–15 season.
- MFK Košice and FK Dukla Banská Bystrica were relegated from the Slovak First Football League after the 2014–15 season.
- OFK Dunajská Lužná, TJ Iskra Borčice, OFK Teplička nad Váhom, FK Spišská Nová Ves and FK Haniska were promoted from the Slovak Third Football League after the 2014–15 season.

== Teams (Western Group) ==
=== Stadiums and locations ===
Location of teams in Slovak 2. liga 2015–16

Team	Home city	Stadium	Capacity	2014–15 season
Dukla Banská Bystrica	Banská Bystrica	SNP Stadium	10,000	
FC Nitra	Nitra	Stadium pod Zoborom	11,384	
ŠK Senec	Senec	NTC Stadium	3,264	
Spartak Trnava juniori	Trnava	Stadium FK Lokomotíva Trnava	1,500	
FK Pohronie	Dolná Ždaňa	FK Pohronie Stadium	1,500	
Slovan Duslo Šaľa	Šaľa	Šaľa Stadium	1,126	
ŠKF Sereď	Sereď	Stadium ŠKF Sereď	5,800	
AFC Nové Mesto nad Váhom	Nové Mesto nad Váhom	Mestský štadión NMnV	2,500	
Slovan Bratislava B	Bratislava	Stadium Rapid - Prievoz	5,000	
MŠK Žilina B	Žilina	Stadium pod Dubňom	11,181	
TJ Iskra Borčice	Borčice	Stadium TJ Iskra Borčice	500	
OFK Dunajská Lužná	Dunajská Lužná	NTC Dunajská Lužná	700	

=== Personnel and kits ===
Team	Head coach	Captain	Kit manufacturer	Shirt sponsor
Dukla Banská Bystrica	(Slovakia) Ľubomír Faktor	(Slovakia) Peter Boroš	Adidas	
Nitra	(Slovakia) Róbert Barborík	(Slovakia) Marek Kostoláni	Jako	Mesto Nitra
Senec	(Slovakia) Attila Pinte	(Slovakia) Peter Polgár	Adidas	Kukkonia
Trnava B	(Slovakia) Pavol Bartoš	(Slovakia) Juraj Galba	Adidas	ZOŠ Trnava
Pohronie	(Slovakia) Štefan Zaťko	(Slovakia) Jozef Sekereš	Adidas	Remeslo
Duslo Šaľa	(Slovakia) Peter Gergely	(Slovakia) Ján Čirik	Adidas	DUSLO
Sereď	(Slovakia) Tibor Meszlényi	(Slovakia) Kamil Vaško	Nike	MH SPORT
Nové Mesto nad Váhom	(Slovakia) Vladimír Hyža	(Slovakia) Lukáš Šebek	Uhlsport	
Slovan B	(Slovakia) Ján Kozák jr.	(Slovakia) Marcel Oravec	Adidas	Niké
Žilina B	(Slovakia) Jaroslav Kentoš	(Slovakia) Tomáš Ďurica	Nike	Preto
Borčice	(Slovakia) Alexander Homér	(Slovakia) Jozef Decký	Hummel	Fabuš
Dunajská Lužná	(Slovakia) Peter Fieber	(Slovakia) František Kecskéš	Luanvi	

=== League table ===
Pos	Team	Pld	W	D	L	GF	GA	GD	Pts	Qualification
1	Iskra Borčice	22	13	3	6	40	19	+21	42	Qualification for Championship round
2	Pohronie	22	12	4	6	29	23	+6	40	Qualification for Championship round
3	Nitra	22	11	3	8	42	27	+15	36	Qualification for Championship round
4	Slovan Bratislava B	22	10	3	9	36	37	−1	33	Qualification for Championship round
5	Žilina B	22	8	9	5	36	28	+8	33	Qualification for Championship round
6	Sereď	22	10	3	9	25	28	−3	33	Qualification for Championship round
7	Dukla Banská Bystrica	22	10	3	9	24	25	−1	33	Qualification for Relegation round
8	Nové Mesto nad Váhom	22	9	4	9	25	25	0	31	Qualification for Relegation round
9	Dunajská Lužná	22	9	4	9	27	32	−5	31	Qualification for Relegation round
10	Šaľa	22	8	1	13	24	39	−15	25	Qualification for Relegation round
11	Spartak Trnava juniori	22	7	0	15	16	27	−11	21	Qualification for Relegation round
12	Senec	22	5	3	14	26	40	−14	18	Qualification for Relegation round

Source: Futbalnet (in Slovak)
Rules for classification: 1) points; 2) goal difference; 3) number of goals scored.

== Teams (Eastern Group) ==
=== Stadium and locations ===
Location of teams in Slovak DOXXbet liga 2015–16

Team	Home city	Stadium	Capacity	2014–15 season
Partizán Bardejov	Bardejov	Stadium mestský Bardejov	3,040	
Tatran Prešov	Prešov	Tatran Stadium	5,410	
MŠK Rimavská Sobota	Rimavská Sobota	Na Záhradkách Stadium	5,000	
Tatran Liptovský Mikuláš	Liptovský Mikuláš	Stadium Liptovský Mikuláš	1,950	
MFK Dolný Kubín	Dolný Kubín	Stadium MUDr. Ivan Chodák	1,950	
FK Poprad	Poprad	NTC Poprad	5,070	
Haniska	Haniska	Štadión FK Haniska	1,000	
Lokomotíva Košice	Košice	Stadium Družstevná pri Hornáde	600	
MFK Lokomotíva Zvolen	Zvolen	MFK Lokomotíva Zvolen Stadium	1,500	
FC VSS Košice	Košice	Štadión Lokomotívy v Čermeli	9,000	
OFK Teplička nad Váhom	Teplička nad Váhom	Stadium OFK Teplička nad Váhom	1,000	
FK Spišská Nová Ves	Spišská Nová Ves	Mestský štadión (Lokomotíva)	10,000	

=== Personnel and kits ===
Team	Head coach	Captain	Kit manufacturer	Shirt sponsor
FC VSS Košice	(Slovakia) Ivan Lapšanský	(Slovakia) Peter Šinglár	Jako	Steel Trans
Prešov	(Slovakia) Stanislav Varga	(Slovakia) Dávid Leško	ATAK Sportswear	DÚHA
Liptovský Mikuláš	(Slovakia) Jozef Kostelník	(Slovakia) Ivan Lišivka	Sportika SA	VEREX
Bardejov	(Slovakia) Rastislav Kica	(Slovakia) Vladislav Palša	Adidas	BARDENERGY
Poprad	(Slovakia) Vladimír Lajčák	(Slovakia) Matúš Bendík	Adidas	
Lokomotíva Košice	(Slovakia) Dušan Ujhely	(Slovakia) Martin Hloušek	Jako, Colo	McCarter
Rimavská Sobota	(Slovakia) Vladimír Goffa	(Slovakia) Jozef Čertík	Givova	CLIPtec
Dolný Kubín	(Slovakia) Pavol Bača	(Slovakia) Michal Drengubiak	Legea	
Haniska	(Slovakia) Pavol Mikloš	(Slovakia) Matúš Horváth	Jako	VEMI
Spišská Nová Ves	(Slovakia) Branislav Ondáš	(Slovakia) Karol Sedláček		DEVELOP & REVITAL
Zvolen	(Slovakia) Anton Jánoš	(Slovakia) Andrej Kamendy	Luanvi	
Teplička nad Váhom	(Slovakia) Stanislav Lojdl	(Slovakia) Marek Filo	Nike	El Toro

=== League table ===
Pos	Team	Pld	W	D	L	GF	GA	GD	Pts	Qualification
1	VSS Košice	20	13	3	4	36	15	+21	42	Qualification for Championship round
2	Prešov	20	11	7	2	46	18	+28	40	Qualification for Championship round
3	Liptovský Mikuláš	20	10	6	4	32	18	+14	36	Qualification for Championship round
4	Zvolen	20	10	3	7	25	22	+3	33	Qualification for Championship round
5	Lokomotíva Košice	20	9	5	6	28	22	+6	32	Qualification for Championship round
6	Bardejov	20	9	4	7	30	26	+4	31	Qualification for Championship round
7	Poprad	20	9	4	7	33	24	+9	31	Qualification for Relegation round
8	Haniska	20	7	4	9	20	32	−12	25	Qualification for Relegation round
9	Spišská Nová Ves	20	4	3	13	16	37	−21	15	Qualification for Relegation round
10	Teplička nad Váhom	20	3	4	13	14	38	−24	13	Qualification for Relegation round
11	Rimavská Sobota	20	2	3	15	14	42	−28	9	Qualification for Relegation round
12	Dolný Kubín (R)	0	0	0	0	0	0	0	0	Withdrew from the league (Note: MFK Dolný Kubín withdrew from the league due to financial problems.)

Source: Futbalnet (in Slovak)
Rules for classification: 1) points; 2) goal difference; 3) number of goals scored.
(R) Relegated

== Play-offs ==
=== Championship round ===
==== League table ====
Pos	Team	Pld	W	D	L	GF	GA	GD	Pts	Promotion
1	Prešov (C, P)	30	16	10	4	61	26	+35	58	Promotion to Fortuna Liga
2	Liptovský Mikuláš	30	16	8	6	52	29	+23	56	
3	VSS Košice (Note: VSS Košice was docked 3 points for non–payment obligations.)	30	18	5	7	48	23	+25	56	
4	Lokomotíva Košice	30	16	6	8	50	34	+16	54	
5	Bardejov	30	16	5	9	49	36	+13	53	
6	Pohronie	30	15	6	9	35	33	+2	51	
7	Nitra	30	13	7	10	54	36	+18	46	
8	Žilina B	30	11	8	11	41	36	+5	41	
9	Zvolen	30	11	6	13	30	34	−4	39	
10	Sereď	30	11	5	14	35	44	−9	38	
11	Slovan Bratislava B	30	9	4	17	38	63	−25	31	
12	Iskra Borčice (R)	0	0	0	0	0	0	0	0	Withdrew from the league (Note: Iskra Borčice withdrew from the league.)

Source: Futbalnet (in Slovak)
Rules for classification: 1) points; 2) goal difference; 3) number of goals scored.
(C) Champions; (P) Promoted; (R) Relegated

=== Relegation round ===
==== League table (West) ====
Pos	Team	Pld	W	D	L	GF	GA	GD	Pts	Relegation
1	Dukla Banská Bystrica	32	16	5	11	45	33	+12	53	
2	Nové Mesto nad Váhom	32	14	5	13	41	39	+2	47	
3	Spartak Trnava juniori	32	15	1	16	36	33	+3	46	
4	Dunajská Lužná (R)	32	11	8	13	38	46	−8	41	Relegation to 3. Liga
5	Šaľa (R)	32	10	3	19	37	58	−21	33	Relegation to 3. Liga
6	Senec (R)	32	6	5	21	35	69	−34	23	Relegation to 3. Liga

Source: Futbalnet (in Slovak)
Rules for classification: 1) points; 2) goal difference; 3) number of goals scored.
(R) Relegated

==== League table (East) ====
Pos	Team	Pld	W	D	L	GF	GA	GD	Pts	Relegation
1	Poprad	28	15	6	7	54	32	+22	51	
2	Haniska	28	8	5	15	23	48	−25	29	
3	Teplička nad Váhom (R)	28	7	5	16	27	50	−23	26	Relegation to 3. Liga
4	Spišská Nová Ves	28	7	4	17	33	50	−17	25	
5	Rimavská Sobota (Note: MŠK Rimavská Sobota was docked 3 points for non–payment obligations.)	28	5	4	19	25	58	−33	16	

Source: Futbalnet (in Slovak)
Rules for classification: 1) points; 2) goal difference; 3) number of goals scored.
(R) Relegated

== Season statistics ==
=== Top goalscorers ===
Updated through matches played on 10 June 2016.

Rank	Player	Club	Goals
1	(Serbia) Marko Milunović	Bardejov	19
2	(Slovakia) Matúš Paukner	FC Nitra	17
2	(Slovakia) Lukáš Šebek	Nové Mesto n. V.	17
4	(Slovakia) Dávid Leško	Tatran Prešov	16
5	(Slovakia) Rudolf Bilas	FK Poprad	13
6	(Slovakia) Marko Lukáč	FK Poprad	12
6	(Slovakia) Róbert Ujčík	FK Poprad	12
8	(Slovakia) Peter Katona	Tatran Prešov	11
8	(Slovakia) Šimon Valachovič	Duslo Šaľa	11
10	(Slovakia) Ján Novák	Iskra Borčice	10
10	(Nigeria) Hector Tubonemi	Tatran Prešov	10
10	(Slovakia) Peter Jasenovský	Liptovský Mikuláš	10
10	(Slovakia) Kamil Karaš	VSS Košice	10

=== Hat-tricks ===
Round	Player	For	Against	Result	Date	Ref
2	(Slovakia) Matúš Paukner	FC Nitra	ŠKF Sereď	5–1	8 August 2015	
4	(Slovakia) Dávid Leško	Tatran Prešov	Zvolen	3–0	22 August 2015	
6	(Slovakia) Matúš Paukner	FC Nitra	ŠK Slovan B	6–1	5 September 2015	
6	(Slovakia) Adam Morong	FC Nitra	ŠK Slovan B	6–1	5 September 2015	
6	(Slovakia) Matúš Pekár	FK Haniska	Spišská n. Ves	0–4	5 September 2015	
8	(Slovakia) Adam Morong	FC Nitra	Dunajská Lužná	5–0	15 September 2015	
9	(Slovakia) Rudolf Bilas	FK Poprad	Rimavská Sobota	3–0	19 September 2015	
9	(Slovakia) Alan Kováč	Borčice	ŠK Slovan B	2–3	21 September 2015	
12	(Slovakia) Dárius Vandraško	L. Mikuláš	Rimavská Sobota	3–1	10 October 2015	
14	(Slovakia) Rudolf Bilas	FK Poprad	MFK Dolný Kubín	4–1	24 October 2015	
20	(Nigeria) Hector Tubonemi	Tatran Prešov	FK Haniska	6–0	12 March 2016	
26	(Ivory Coast) Kouakou Privat Yao	Spartak Trnava juniori	ŠK Senec	1–4	23 April 2016	
31	(Slovakia) Kamil Karaš	FC VSS Košice	Slovan Bratislava B	3–1	22 May 2016	

== See also ==
- 2015–16 Slovak First Football League
- 2015–16 3. Liga (Slovakia)

=== Stats ===
- List of transfers summer 2015
- List of transfers winter 2015–16
