= 2017–18 2. Liga (Slovakia) =

2. Liga
- Season: 2017–18
- Champions: ŠKF Sereď
- Promoted: ŠKF Sereď
- Relegated: AFC Nové Mesto nad Váhom; FK Spišská Nová Ves; MFK Lokomotíva Zvolen; FK Železiarne Podbrezová II
- Top goalscorer: Michal Hamuľak (20 goals)

The 2017–18 2. Liga (Slovakia) season was the 25th edition of the second tier 2. Liga football annual tournament in Slovakia, since its establishment in 1993. It began on 28 July 2017 and concluded on 20 May 2018.

== Teams ==
=== Team changes ===
Promoted from 2016–17 3. Liga	Relegated from 2016–17 Slovak First Football League	Promoted to 2017–18 Slovak First Football League	Relegated to 2017–18 3. Liga (Slovakia)	Dissolved
FK Inter Bratislava; KFC Komárno; FK Železiarne Podbrezová B FK Slavoj Trebišov	none	FC Nitra	Spartak Trnava II; Slovan Bratislava II; ŠK Svätý Jur; MŠK Fomat Martin; MŠK Rimavská Sobota; ŠK Odeva Lipany; FK Haniska	FC VSS Košice; FK Dukla Banská Bystrica

=== Stadiums and locations ===
Location of teams in Slovak 2. liga 2017–18

Team	Location	Stadium	Capacity
MFK Skalica	Skalica	Mestský štadión Skalica	3,000
FC ŠTK 1914 Šamorín	Šamorín	Pomlé Stadium	1,950
MŠK Žilina B	Žilina	Štadión pod Dubňom	11,258
ŠKF Sereď	Sereď	Stadium ŠKF Sereď	5,800
FC Lokomotíva Košice	Košice	Stadium Družstevná pri Hornáde	600
Partizán Bardejov	Bardejov	Mestský štadión Bardejov	3,040
FK Pohronie	Žiar nad Hronom	Mestský štadión	2,309
MFK Tatran Liptovský Mikuláš	Liptovský Mikuláš	Stadium Liptovský Mikuláš	1,950
MFK Lokomotíva Zvolen	Zvolen	MFK Lokomotíva Zvolen Stadium	1,870
FK Spišská Nová Ves	Spišská Nová Ves	Mestský štadión (Lokomotíva)	10,000
AFC Nové Mesto nad Váhom	Nové Mesto nad Váhom	Mestský štadión NMnV	2,500
FK Poprad	Poprad	NTC Poprad	5,070
Inter Bratislava	Stupava	Stupavský štadión	1,100
KFC Komárno	Komárno	Mestský štadión Komárno	1,250
FK Železiarne Podbrezová B	Podbrezová	ZELPO Aréna	4,061
FK Slavoj Trebišov	Trebišov	Štadión Slavoj Trebišov	2,000

=== Personnel and kits ===
Team	Head coach	Captain	Kit manufacturer	Shirt sponsor
Skalica	(Slovakia) Jozef Kostelník	(Slovakia) Michal Jakubek	Nike	
Nové Mesto nad Váhom	(Slovakia) Dušan Kramlík	(Slovakia) Lukáš Šebek	Adidas	Heraldik Slovakia
Inter Bratislava	(Slovakia) Jozef Brezovský	(Slovakia) Peter Petráš	hummel	
Šamorín	(Brazil) Gustavo Leal	(Slovakia) Ľubomír Mezovský	Adidas	bitumat
Žilina B	(Slovakia) Jaroslav Kentoš	(Slovakia) Michal Klec	Nike	Preto
Sereď	(Slovakia) Michal Gašparík	(Slovakia) Martin Mečiar	Nike	MH SPORT
Pohronie	(Slovakia) Milan Nemec	(Slovakia) Lukáš Tesák	Erreà	REMESLO
Lokomotíva Košice	(Slovakia) Albert Rusnák	(Slovakia) Patrik Zajac	Jako	BANCO CASINO
Tatran Liptovský Mikuláš	(Slovakia) Jozef Šino	(Slovakia) Ivan Lišivka	Sportika SA	VEREX
Partizán Bardejov	(Poland) Ryszard Kuźma	(Slovakia) Vladimír Andraščík	Adidas	Bardenergy
Lokomotíva Zvolen	(Slovakia) Marián Süttö	(Slovakia) Igor Kotora	Luanvi	IKM
Poprad	(Slovakia) Jaroslav Belejčák	(Slovakia) Vladislav Palša	Adidas	Ritro
Noves Spišská Nová Ves	(Slovakia) Branislav Ondáš	(Slovakia) Karol Sedláček	Sportika SA	Noves
Komárno	(Slovakia) Jozef Olejník	(Slovakia) Michal Podlucký	Adidas	
Slavoj Trebišov	(Slovakia) Karol Kisel sr.	(Slovakia) Jaroslav Kolbas	Adidas	Deva
Železiarne Podbrezová B	(Slovakia) Mário Auxt	(Slovakia) Erik Hric	Adidas	Železiarne Podbrezová

== League table ==
Pos	Team	Pld	W	D	L	GF	GA	GD	Pts	Promotion or relegation
1	Sereď (C, P)	30	20	6	4	73	25	+48	66	Promotion to Fortuna Liga
2	Skalica	30	19	5	6	46	27	+19	62	Qualification for promotion play-offs
3	Poprad	30	15	7	8	45	25	+20	52	
4	Lokomotíva Košice	30	15	6	9	50	35	+15	51	
5	Žilina B	30	15	4	11	71	41	+30	49	
6	Komárno	30	12	7	11	49	58	−9	43	
7	Šamorín	30	12	6	12	38	34	+4	42	
8	Inter Bratislava	30	12	5	13	45	46	−1	41	
9	Pohronie	30	9	11	10	41	35	+6	38	
10	Slavoj Trebišov	30	10	7	13	27	44	−17	37	
11	Tatran Liptovský Mikuláš	30	9	9	12	38	39	−1	36	
12	Partizán Bardejov	30	10	5	15	39	47	−8	35	
13	Nové Mesto n. Váhom (R)	30	9	5	16	33	57	−24	32	Relegation to 3. Liga
14	Noves Spišská Nová Ves (R)	30	8	6	16	32	60	−28	30	Relegation to 3. Liga
15	Lokomotíva Zvolen (R)	30	7	7	16	26	53	−27	28	Relegation to 3. Liga
16	Železiarne Podbrezová B (R)	30	6	8	16	24	51	−27	26	Relegation to 3. Liga

Source: Futbalnet (in Slovak)
Rules for classification: 1) Points; 2) Goal difference; 3) Goals scored
(C) Champions; (P) Promoted; (R) Relegated

== Results ==
Home \ Away	POH	INT	KOM	LKE	ZVO	NMV	PAR	POB	POP	SER	SKA	STV	SNV	LMI	SAM	ZAB
Pohronie		1–0	2–1	2–1	3–0	5–0	1–1	0–1	0–0	2–3	0–2	4–0	1–0	2–1	1–1	2–1
Inter Bratislava	2–1		0–0	0–3	3–1	2–3	5–0	4–1	1–0	2–1	1–2	1–0	2–0	2–1	0–0	1–7
Komárno	3–3	3–2		4–0	3–1	1–2	3–3	1–0	0–4	1–6	1–1	1–0	7–0	1–1	2–1	2–0
Lokomotíva Košice	2–2	2–0	4–1		2–1	3–2	2–0	2–1	0–1	0–0	2–0	0–1	5–0	2–1	0–3	2–0
Lokomotíva Zvolen	1–0	0–3	1–2	1–0		1–1	0–0	0–1	3–2	0–0	1–2	3–0	2–2	0–0	1–0	0–2
Nové Mesto n. Váhom	1–1	1–3	0–1	0–3	0–0		1–2	1–0	0–2	0–3	1–2	1–1	1–2	1–0	1–2	0–2
Partizán Bardejov	1–0	1–2	0–2	1–3	3–0	1–0		7–0	1–0	0–0	2–0	2–1	4–0	3–3	1–3	3–1
Podbrezová B	2–2	1–1	1–1	3–3	1–3	1–1	1–0		0–6	0–1	1–0	1–1	2–3	0–0	0–1	1–1
Poprad	1–1	1–0	1–1	2–0	3–1	2–0	3–1	1–0		1–0	0–0	0–0	3–1	1–1	4–0	1–1
Sereď	2–1	4–1	3–0	2–1	4–1	7–0	6–0	4–2	0–2		5–0	1–0	3–3	3–1	2–1	2–0
Skalica	1–0	2–1	3–1	2–1	3–0	2–0	1–0	2–0	1–0	2–1		2–0	4–0	4–1	2–0	3–2
Slavoj Trebišov	0–0	1–1	0–2	0–1	1–1	2–4	3–1	2–0	3–2	0–3	1–1		2–1	2–1	1–0	1–0
Spišská Nová Ves	2–2	1–0	4–2	1–1	0–1	1–2	2–1	0–1	0–2	1–3	1–0	1–2		2–2	0–2	2–0
Tatran Liptovský Mikuláš	2–0	3–2	4–1	1–2	7–0	1–2	1–0	1–0	1–0	0–0	1–1	0–1	0–0		1–0	1–0
Šamorín	2–1	1–1	3–0	1–1	3–1	1–3	1–0	0–1	3–0	0–0	1–1	2–0	0–2	4–0		2–3
Žilina B	1–1	4–2	8–1	2–2	2–1	3–4	2–0	2–1	5–0	3–4	2–0	7–1	3–0	3–1	4–0	

Source: Futbalnet (in Slovak)
Legend: Blue = home team win; Yellow = draw; Red = away team win.

== Statistics ==
=== Top goalscorers ===
As of 20 May 2018

Rank	Player	Club	Goals
1	(Slovakia) Michal Hamuľak	Partizán Bardejov	20
2	(Slovakia) Stanislav Šesták	Poprad	18
3	(Slovakia) Adam Morong	Sereď	16
3	(Serbia) Samir Nurković	Pohronie(4)/Komárno(12)	16
5	(Slovakia) Rajmund Mikuš	Nové Mesto nad Váhom	15
5	(Czech Republic) Roman Haša	Skalica	15
7	(Slovakia) Kamil Karaš	Lokomotíva Košice	13
7	(Serbia) Goran Matić	Komárno	13
9	(Slovakia) Kamil Zekucia	Noves Spišská Nová Ves	11
10	(Armenia) Vahagn Militosyan	Komárno	10
10	(Serbia) Dragan Andrić	Tatran Liptovský Mikuláš	10
