= 2013–14 3. Liga (Slovakia) =

3. Liga
- Season: 2013–14
- Champions: ŠKF Sereď (West); TJ Baník Ružiná (East)
- Promoted: ŠKF Sereď (West); MFK Skalica; AFC Nové Mesto nad Váhom; Slovan Bratislava B TJ Baník Ružiná (East); Žilina B MFK Dolný Kubín; FK Poprad; FK Bodva Moldava nad Bodvou; MFK Košice B FC Lokomotíva Košice; FK Slavoj Trebišov
- Relegated: FC Petržalka 1898 (West)
- Top goalscorer: Alan Kováč (20 goals) /Western division/ Roman Jurko, Marek Gajdošík (15 goals) /Eastern division/

The 2013–14 season of the 3. Liga (also known as the TIPOS 3. liga for sponsorship reasons) was the twenty-first season of the third-tier football league in Slovakia, since its establishment in 1993.

The league was composed of 32 teams divided into two groups of 16 teams each, whose teams will be divided geographically (Western and Eastern). Teams played only other teams in their own division.

== TIPOS 3. liga Západ ==
Changes from last season

=== Team changes ===
==== To TIPOS 3. liga Západ ====
Promoted from Majstrovstvá regiónu

- FK Rača
- FC Horses Šúrovce
- MFK Skalica

Relegated from 2. liga

- None

==== From TIPOS 3. liga Západ ====
Promoted to 2. liga

- Spartak Trnava juniori

Relegated to Majstrovstvá regiónu

- FC Nitra juniori

Not registered to 3. liga Západ

- LP Domino
- OTJ Moravany nad Váhom (follower FK Púchov bought their license)

=== Locations ===
Location of teams in TIPOS 3. liga západ 2013–14

=== League table ===
Pos	Team	Pld	W	D	L	GF	GA	GD	Pts	Promotion or relegation
1	Sereď (C, P)	30	22	4	4	86	27	+59	70	Promotion to 2. Liga
2	Skalica (P)	30	21	5	4	70	26	+44	68	Promotion to 2. Liga
3	Nové Mesto nad Váhom (P)	30	19	5	6	50	26	+24	62	Promotion to 2. Liga
4	Slovan Bratislava B (P)	30	17	8	5	83	35	+48	59	Promotion to 2. Liga
5	Topoľčany	30	17	5	8	45	22	+23	56	
6	Dunajská Lužná	30	15	6	9	60	35	+25	51	
7	Šúrovce	30	14	4	12	59	49	+10	46	
8	Nemšová	30	12	4	14	36	39	−3	40	
9	Vráble	30	9	10	11	33	38	−5	37	
10	Nové Zámky	30	10	5	15	35	52	−17	35	
11	Vrbové	30	9	7	14	33	47	−14	34	
12	Rača	30	8	5	17	34	48	−14	29	
13	Púchov	30	8	4	18	34	51	−17	28	
14	FC Petržalka 1898 (R)	30	9	5	16	40	52	−12	26 (Note: FC Petržalka 1898 was docked 6 points for non–payment obligations.)	Folded after bankruptcy (Note: Petržalka went bankrupt and folded after financial problems.)
15	Levice	30	6	5	19	30	69	−39	23	
16	Piešťany	30	1	4	25	8	120	−112	7	

Source: TIPOS III. LZ Sezóna 2013/2014/Základná časť
Rules for classification: 1) points; 2) head-to-head points; 3) head-to-head goal difference; 4) head-to-head goals scored; 5) goal difference; 6) number of goals scored.
(C) Champions; (P) Promoted; (R) Relegated

== TIPOS 3. liga Východ ==
Changes from last season

=== Team changes ===
==== To TIPOS 3. liga Východ ====
Promoted from Majstrovstvá regiónu

- MŠK Žilina B
- ŠK Milenium 2000 Bardejovská Nová Ves

Relegated from 2. liga

- MFK Dolný Kubín
- TJ Baník Ružiná

==== From 3. liga Východ ====
Promoted to 2. liga

- FK Pohronie

Relegated to Majstrovstvá regiónu

- FK Spišská Nová Ves

Not registered to 3. liga Východ

- Dukla Banská Bystrica juniori

=== Locations ===
Location of teams in TIPOS 3. liga východ 2013–14

=== League table ===
Pos	Team	Pld	W	D	L	GF	GA	GD	Pts	Promotion or qualification
1	Ružiná (C, P)	30	18	8	4	71	38	+33	62	Promotion to 2. Liga
2	Žilina B (P)	30	19	3	8	60	35	+25	60	Promotion to 2. Liga
3	Dolný Kubín (P)	30	16	6	8	46	30	+16	54	Promotion to 2. Liga
4	Poprad (P)	30	14	7	9	46	31	+15	49	Promotion to 2. Liga
5	Martin	30	12	9	9	43	32	+11	45	
6	Moldava nad Bodvou (P)	30	13	8	9	51	36	+15	44	Promotion to 2. Liga
7	MFK Košice B (P)	30	12	8	10	51	38	+13	44	Promotion to 2. Liga
8	Lokomotíva Košice (P)	30	12	7	11	36	33	+3	43	Promotion to 2. Liga
9	Trebišov (P)	30	14	1	15	38	49	−11	43	Promotion to 2. Liga
10	Humenné	30	12	6	12	37	54	−17	42	Qualification for promotion play-offs
11	Tatran Prešov B	30	10	9	11	32	31	+1	39	
12	Námestovo	30	9	8	13	34	34	0	35	
13	Lipany	30	8	5	17	32	55	−23	29	
14	Kremnička	30	8	6	16	26	40	−14	27	
15	Vranov nad Topľou	30	7	6	17	30	58	−28	27	
16	Bardejovská Nová Ves	30	6	3	21	27	66	−39	21	

Source: TIPOS III. LV Sezóna 2013/2014 / Základná časť
Rules for classification: 1) points; 2) goal difference; 3) number of goals scored.
(C) Champions; (P) Promoted
