= 2014–15 3. Liga (Slovakia) =

3. Liga
- Season: 2014–15
- Champions: Dunajská Lužná (Bratislava); Borčice (West); Teplička nad Váhom (Middle); Spišská Nová Ves (East)
- Promoted: Dunajská Lužná (Bratislava); Borčice (West); Teplička nad Váhom (Middle); Spišská Nová Ves (East); Haniska (East)
- Top goalscorer: Ján Kadera (25 goals) Bratislava; Michal Gašparík, Ladislav Belkovics (15 goals) West, Michal Babic, Emil Le Giang (20 goals) Middle, Matúš Pekár (20 goals) East

The 2014–15 3. Liga was the 22nd 3. liga season and the first one after reorganization in summer 2014. The league was composed by 66 teams divided in four different groups of 16 each and 3. liga Západ (West) included 18 teams. Teams were divided into four divisions: 3. liga Bratislava, 3. liga Západ (West), 3. liga Stred (Central), 3. liga Východ (Eastern), according to geographical separation.

== 3. liga Bratislava ==
=== Locations ===
Location of teams in the 2014–15 3. Liga Bratislava
Greater Bratislava 3. liga football clubs

=== League table ===
Pos	Team	Pld	W	D	L	GF	GA	GD	Pts	Promotion or relegation
1	Dunajská Lužná (C, P)	30	23	5	2	81	22	+59	74	Promotion to 2. Liga
2	Rohožník	30	21	6	3	61	19	+42	69	
3	FK Rača	30	17	6	7	62	29	+33	57	
4	Kráľová pri Senci	30	14	8	8	42	25	+17	50	
5	Most pri Bratislave	30	13	9	8	37	31	+6	48	
6	Inter Bratislava	30	13	8	9	46	41	+5	47	
7	Svätý Jur	30	12	7	11	52	35	+17	43	
8	Rovinka	30	12	6	12	41	41	0	42	
9	Lozorno	30	12	5	13	34	37	−3	41	
10	Tomášov	30	11	8	11	33	38	−5	41	
11	Báhoň	30	10	6	14	33	47	−14	36	
12	Bernolákovo	30	10	5	15	42	57	−15	35	
13	Slovenský Grob	30	6	7	17	36	69	−33	25	
14	Ivanka pri Dunaji	30	5	6	19	19	60	−41	21	
15	Viničné	30	5	6	19	28	67	−39	21	
16	Stupava (R)	30	5	4	21	22	51	−29	19	Relegation to 4. liga

Source: III. LIGA BRATISLAVA
Rules for classification: 1) points; 2) goal difference; 3) number of goals scored.
(C) Champions; (P) Promoted; (R) Relegated

== 3. liga Západ ==
=== Locations ===
Location of teams in the 2014–15 3. Liga Západ (West)

=== League table ===
Pos	Team	Pld	W	D	L	GF	GA	GD	Pts	Promotion or relegation
1	Borčice (C, P)	32	23	6	3	72	18	+54	75	Promotion to 2. Liga
2	Veľký Meder	32	20	10	2	63	19	+44	70	
3	Gabčíkovo	32	16	10	6	63	30	+33	58	
4	Neded	32	15	10	7	40	32	+8	55	
5	Veľké Ludince	32	15	7	10	46	31	+15	52	
6	Palárikovo	32	12	9	11	37	32	+5	45	
7	Vráble	32	12	9	11	32	34	−2	45	
8	Spartak Trnava C	32	11	11	10	51	49	+2	44	
9	Nemšová	32	11	9	12	33	37	−4	42	
10	Topoľčany	32	11	7	14	38	55	−17	40	
11	Komárno	32	10	9	13	39	46	−7	39	
12	Dunajská Streda B	32	11	6	15	38	41	−3	39	
13	Nové Zámky	32	10	7	15	38	51	−13	37	
14	Púchov	32	8	12	12	26	35	−9	36	
15	Lednické Rovne	32	8	5	19	27	59	−32	29	
16	Vrbové (R)	32	6	4	22	20	49	−29	22	Relegation to 4. liga
17	Levice (R)	32	6	3	23	28	73	−45	21	Relegation to 4. liga
18	Piešťany (R)	0	0	0	0	0	0	0	0	Withdrew from the league

Source: III. LIGA
Rules for classification: 1) points; 2) goal difference; 3) number of goals scored.
(C) Champions; (P) Promoted; (R) Relegated

== 3. liga Stred ==
=== Locations ===
Location of teams in the 2014–15 3. Liga Stred (Central)

=== League table ===
Pos	Team	Pld	W	D	L	GF	GA	GD	Pts	Promotion or relegation
1	Teplička nad Váhom (C, P)	28	22	5	1	66	17	+49	71	Promotion to 2. Liga
2	Martin	28	18	6	4	62	22	+40	60	
3	Makov	28	16	3	9	68	33	+35	51	
4	Námestovo	28	14	7	7	42	30	+12	49	
5	Kremnička	28	12	8	8	51	45	+6	44	
6	Kalinovo	28	11	8	9	47	34	+13	41	
7	Liptovský Hrádok	28	13	2	13	48	52	−4	41	
8	Nová Baňa (R)	28	11	3	14	42	48	−6	36	Relegation to 5. liga
9	Rakytovce (R)	28	11	3	14	40	53	−13	36	Relegation to 5. liga
10	Lučenec	28	10	5	13	35	45	−10	35	
11	Bytča	28	9	5	14	47	54	−7	32	
12	Pohronie B	28	8	6	14	34	55	−21	30	
13	Čadca	28	7	4	17	28	39	−11	25	
14	Krásno nad Kysucou	28	6	5	17	27	61	−34	23	
15	Žarnovica	28	6	2	20	37	86	−49	20	
16	Brusno (R)	0	0	0	0	0	0	0	0	Withdrew from the league

Source: III.LIGA
Rules for classification: 1) points; 2) goal difference; 3) number of goals scored.
(C) Champions; (P) Promoted; (R) Relegated

== 3. liga Východ ==
=== Locations ===
Location of teams in the 2014–15 3. Liga Východ (East)

=== League table ===
Pos	Team	Pld	W	D	L	GF	GA	GD	Pts	Promotion or relegation
1	Spišská Nová Ves (C, P)	30	18	2	10	65	30	+35	56	Promotion to 2. Liga
2	Haniska (P)	30	17	4	9	63	35	+28	55	Promotion to 2. Liga
3	Lipany	30	16	4	10	37	30	+7	52	
4	Tatran Prešov juniori	30	16	2	12	47	27	+20	50	
5	Vranov nad Topľou	30	15	5	10	43	30	+13	50	
6	Vyšné Opátske	30	14	5	11	52	44	+8	47	
7	Snina	30	13	8	9	39	34	+5	47	
8	Veľké Revištia	30	13	4	13	40	49	−9	43	
9	Giraltovce	30	13	4	13	31	42	−11	43	
10	Stropkov	30	12	6	12	47	38	+9	42	
11	Plavnica	30	11	6	13	36	38	−2	39	
12	Bardejovská Nová Ves	30	11	6	13	37	52	−15	39	
13	Sabinov	30	10	7	13	42	38	+4	37	
14	Humenné	30	11	3	16	31	60	−29	36	
15	Starý Smokovec - Vysoké Tatry (R)	30	9	6	15	43	45	−2	33	Relegation to 4. liga
16	Michalovce B (R)	30	3	4	23	25	86	−61	13	Relegation to 4. liga

Source: III. LIGA VÝCHOD DOSPELÍ VSFZ
Rules for classification: 1) points; 2) goal difference; 3) number of goals scored.
(C) Champions; (P) Promoted; (R) Relegated
