= Marek Igaz =

Slovak footballer

Personal information
- Full name: Marek Igaz
- Date of birth: 13 September 1986 (age 40)
- Place of birth: Trenčín, Czechoslovakia
- Height: 1.97 m (6 ft 5 1/2 in)
- Position: Goalkeeper

Team information
- Current team: Nové Mesto nad Váhom
- Number: 53

Youth career
- 1993–2004: ZTS Dubnica
- 2004–2006: FC Elseremo Brumov

Senior career*
Years	Team	Apps	(Gls)
2006–2011	Dubnica	16	(0)
2011	Púchov		
2012–2014	GKS Tychy	27	(0)
2015	Iskra Borčice	3	(0)
2015–2020	GKS Tychy	7	(0)
2020–	Nové Mesto nad Váhom		
- * Club domestic league appearances and goals as of 20 April 2024

Marek Igaz (born 13 September 1986) is a Slovak footballer who plays as a goalkeeper for Nové Mesto nad Váhom.

== Career ==
The goalkeeper began his career with FK ZTS Dubnica and moved to Czech club FC Elseremo Brumov in 2004. After two years with Brumov, Igaz returned to ZTS Dubnica in the summer of 2006.

== Personal life ==
Igaz was born in Trenčín and grew up in Bánovce nad Bebravou.
