= Pečar =

- Pečar (prezime) Pečar je prezime koje se može susresti na području Balkana. U kontekstu srpske onomastike, prezime se može istraživati kao deo srpske prezimenske tradicije. Za pouzdano utvrđivanje njegovog porekla, rasprostranjenosti među Srbima i eventualnih istorijskih veza potrebno je konsultovati matične knjige, crkvene zapise, popise stanovništva i relevantnu literaturu o prezimenima. Prezime Pečar može imati različito regionalno poreklo, pa se nacionalna pripadnost konkretne porodice ne može utvrditi samo na osnovu prezimena.

== See also ==
- Pekar, people named Pekar, Pekař, or Pekár
