= Jozef Majoroš (footballer, born 1978) =

Slovak football coach (born 1978)

Personal information
- Date of birth: 21 March 1978 (age 48)
- Place of birth: Šaca, Czechoslovakia
- Height: 1.74 m (5 ft 9 in)
- Position: Midfielder

Senior career*
Years	Team	Apps	(Gls)
1995–1998	1. FC Košice		
1997	→ Lokomotíva Košice (loan)		
1998–2000	Artmedia Petržalka		
2000	→ 1. FC Košice (loan)		
2001–2010	1. FC Košice		
?–2004	Steel TransLičartovce		
2009	→ Bodva Moldava nad Bodvou (loan)		
2009–2010	→ Vyšné Opátske (loan)		
2010–2015	Vyšné Opátske		
2013–2014	→ ŠKO Veľká Ida (loan)		

Managerial career
- 2016–2017: VSS Košice
- 2017–2019: Zemplín Michalovce (assistant)
- 2019–2021: Zemplín Michalovce
- * Club domestic league appearances and goals

Jozef Majoroš (born 21 March 1978) is a Slovak football coach and former player. He spent most of his playing career at clubs in Košice. As a head coach he won the DOXXbet liga with VSS Košice in 2017 and later spent over a year in charge of Zemplín Michalovce.

== Playing career ==
Majoroš was part of the 1. FC Košice squad which won back-to-back Slovak First Football League titles in the late 1990s. He spent two years at Artmedia Petržalka before returning to Košice, where he was part of the side which won promotion from the 2. Liga in 2006. He later played for Lokomotíva Košice and Ličartovce, before joining Bodva Moldava nad Bodvou on loan in 2009 from MFK Košice's B-team. He finished his professional playing career at the age of 31 due to injury.

== Coaching career ==
Majoroš was head coach of VSS Košice in the 2016–17 season. He led the club to the 2016–17 2. Liga title, winning the competition with a game to spare. After the club experienced financial difficulties which resulted in them disbanding, he joined Zemplín Michalovce as an assistant coach in July 2017.

After a period serving as assistant coach to Anton Šoltis at Zemplín Michalovce, Majoroš became head coach of the club in November 2019, starting his tenure with three consecutive wins. He remained in his position until April 2021 when the club announced his departure after a series of poor results.

== Personal life ==
Majoroš married his wife Martina, also a footballer, in 2000. They have two daughters, one of whom played for Slovakia women's national under-16 basketball team.

== Honours ==
=== Manager ===
VSS Košice

- DOXXbet liga: Winners: 2016–17
