= Matúš Horváth =

Matúš Horváth may refer to:

- Matúš Horváth, a victim of the 2022 Bratislava shooting
- Matúš Horváth, captain of the FK Haniska football club
