= 2013–14 2. Liga (Slovakia) =

2. liga
- Season: 2013–14
- Champions: ŽP Šport Podbrezová
- Relegated: none
- Matches: 198
- Goals: 503 (2.54 per match)
- Top goalscorer: Michal Hamuľak (26 goals)
- Biggest home win: Prešov 7–0 Spartak Trnava juniori
- Biggest away win: Dubnica 1–7 Podbrezová
- Highest scoring: Spartak Trnava juniori 4–4 Šaľa; Dubnica 1–7 Podbrezová
- Highest attendance: Michalovce 3–0 Dubnica (1,890)
- Lowest attendance: SFM Senec 1–1 Liptovský Mikuláš (460)

The 2013–14 season of the 2. Liga was the 21st season of the second-tier football league in Slovakia, since its establishment in 1993.

Twelve teams competed in the league, with bottom side will play the relegation play-offs.

== Changes from last season ==
=== Team changes ===
- DAC Dunajská Streda was promoted to the Slovak First Football League after the 2012–13 season.
- 1. FC Tatran Prešov was relegated from the Slovak First Football League after the 2012–13 season.
- Spartak Trnava juniori and FK Pohronie were promoted from the Slovak Third Football League after the 2012–13 season.
- MFK Dolný Kubín and Ružiná were relegated to the Slovak Third Football League after the 2012–13 season.

== Teams ==
=== Stadiums and locations ===
Location of teams in Slovak 2. liga 2013–14

Team	Home city	Stadium	Capacity	2012–13 season
Prešov	Prešov	1. FC Tatran Prešov stadium	5,410	12th in Corgoň Liga
Podbrezová	Podbrezová	Stadium Kolkáreň	4,500	2nd in 2. liga
SFM Senec	Senec	NTC Stadium	3,264	3rd in 2. liga
Bardejov	Bardejov	Stadium mestský Bardejov	3,040	4th in 2. liga
Michalovce	Michalovce	Zemplin Stadium	4,620	5th in 2. liga
Šamorín	Šamorín	Pomlé Stadium	1,950	6th in 2. liga
Šaľa	Šaľa	Šaľa Stadium	1,126	7th in 2. liga
Dubnica	Dubnica	Mestský štadión	5,450	8th in 2. liga
Rimavská Sobota	Rimavská Sobota	Na Záhradkách Stadium	1,970	9th in 2. liga
Liptovský Mikuláš	Liptovský Mikuláš	Stadium Liptovský Mikuláš	1,950	10th in 2. liga
Spartak Trnava juniori	Trnava	Stadium FK Lokomotíva Trnava	1,500	3. liga Champions (West)
FK Pohronie	Dolná Ždaňa	FK Pohronie Stadium	1,500	3. liga Champions (East)

== League table ==
Pos	Team	Pld	W	D	L	GF	GA	GD	Pts	Promotion or qualification
1	Podbrezová (C, P)	33	26	4	3	64	16	+48	82	Promotion to Fortuna Liga
2	Bardejov	33	17	10	6	49	25	+24	61	
3	Michalovce	33	18	7	8	55	28	+27	61	
4	Prešov	33	18	6	9	56	28	+28	60	
5	SFM Senec	33	13	10	10	39	32	+7	49	
6	Spartak Trnava juniori	33	10	9	14	57	64	−7	39	
7	Rimavská Sobota	33	9	11	13	32	39	−7	38	
8	Dubnica	33	10	5	18	30	64	−34	35	
9	Pohronie	33	10	4	19	38	60	−22	34	
10	Šaľa	33	8	8	17	30	45	−15	32	
11	Šamorín	33	8	7	18	33	55	−22	31	
12	Liptovský Mikuláš (O)	33	7	7	19	25	52	−27	28	Qualification for Relegation play-offs

Source: LIGA.cz (in Czech)
Rules for classification: 1) points; 2) goal difference; 3) number of goals scored.
(C) Champions; (O) Play-off winners; (P) Promoted

== Results ==
The schedule consisted of three rounds. The two first rounds consisted of a conventional home and away round-robin schedule. The pairings of the third round were set according to the 2012–13 final standings. Every team played each opponent once for a total of 11 games per team.

=== First and second round ===
Home \ Away	POH	PAR	POD	RIM	ŠAĽ	STJ	LMI	PRE	ZMI	DUB	SAM	SEN
Pohronie		1–1	1–6	1–1	2–1	1–2	0–1	0–2	0–3	2–1	1–1	1–4
Partizán Bardejov	1–0		2–2	0–0	1–0	1–1	5–2	1–0	1–0	4–2	3–0	1–0
Podbrezová	1–0	1–0		2–0	5–2	2–0	1–0	3–0	1–0	4–0	3–0	0–1
Rimavská Sobota	1–0	1–1	1–2		3–1	3–2	2–0	1–0	1–1	1–2	0–0	2–1
Šaľa	2–1	0–0	0–1	1–0		1–2	0–0	0–1	0–0	2–0	2–1	1–1
Spartak Trnava juniori	3–1	0–1	0–2	1–1	2–1		3–0	3–1	3–3	4–0	1–1	2–2
Liptovský Mikuláš	0–3	0–1	1–2	2–3	1–0	2–5		0–2	1–1	1–2	1–1	0–0
Prešov	1–1	1–0	2–0	1–0	3–0	7–0	4–1		1–0	2–0	1–1	0–0
Zemplín Michalovce	6–1	2–1	1–0	3–1	2–0	1–1	1–0	2–0		3–0	3–0	2–0
Dubnica	1–0	1–1	1–1	1–1	1–1	2–3	1–0	0–2	1–2		1–4	0–3
Šamorín	4–1	0–1	0–1	0–0	2–1	2–1	1–0	1–4	2–2	0–1		0–3
SFM Senec	1–3	1–4	1–1	0–0	2–1	2–1	1–1	2–0	2–0	0–0	2–0	

Source: LIGA.cz (in Czech)
Legend: Blue = home team win; Yellow = draw; Red = away team win.

=== Third round ===
Home \ Away	POH	PAR	POD	RIM	ŠAĽ	STJ	LMI	PRE	ZMI	DUB	SAM	SEN
Pohronie				1–0	1–0			3–1	1–3			1–2
Partizán Bardejov	2–1		0–0	0–0	1–2	1–1			2–1			
Podbrezová	2–1			3–1	3–0	2–0			2–0			1–0
Rimavská Sobota					1–1		0–1	1–2	0–2			1–2
Šaľa							0–0	2–0	2–1	0–1		0–1
Spartak Trnava juniori	1–2			2–4	4–4		3–0			1–2		
Liptovský Mikuláš	1–2	2–1	0–4							1–0	3–1	
Prešov		2–1	0–1			4–1	1–1			5–0	4–0	0–0
Zemplín Michalovce						2–1	0–1	1–1		2–1	3–0	2–0
Dubnica	2–1	1–7	1–3	1–2							2–1	
Šamorín	2–3	0–2	0–2	2–0	1–2	4–1						
SFM Senec		0–1				2–2	2–1	1–1		0–1	0–1	

Source: LIGA.cz (in Czech)
Legend: Blue = home team win; Yellow = draw; Red = away team win.

== Relegation play-offs ==
MFK Tatran Liptovský Mikuláš, who finished 12th, faced ŠK Futura Humenné, the 10th-placed 2013–14 3. Liga (East) side for a one-legged play-off.

=== Final leg ===
18 June 2014
17:00 CEST

MFK Tatran Liptovský Mikuláš	0−0 (a.e.t.)	ŠK Futura Humenné
	Report
Penalties
Kuharčík (penalty scored); Latiak (penalty missed); Šavol (penalty missed); Matić (penalty scored); Asanović (penalty missed); Jánošík (penalty missed); Mizera (penalty scored); Balluch (penalty scored); Kubena (penalty scored)	5–4	(penalty scored) Hreško; (penalty scored) Jakubčo; (penalty missed) Šuľák; (penalty missed) Vasiľ; (penalty missed) Ovšianik; (penalty missed) Pillár; (penalty scored) Mihok; (penalty scored) Havrila; (penalty missed) Legdan

NTC Poprad, Poprad
Attendance: 887
Referee: Ivan Kružliak

== Top goalscorers ==
Updated through matches played 31 May 2014.

Rank	Player	Club	Goals
1	(Slovakia) Michal Hamuľak	MFK Zemplín Michalovce	25
2	(Slovakia) Štefan Gerec	ŽP Šport Podbrezová	15
3	(Slovakia) Blažej Vaščák	ŽP Šport Podbrezová	13
4	(Slovakia) Dávid Leško	1. FC Tatran Prešov	11
5	(Brazil) Dyjan	Partizán Bardejov	10
5	(Slovakia) Róbert Richnák	Spartak Trnava juniori	10
7	(Slovakia) Pavol Orolín	ŠK Senec (8)/Pohronie (1)	9
7	(Slovakia) Michal Páleník	FK Pohronie	9
7	(Slovakia) Lukáš Hruška	1. FC Tatran Prešov	9
10	(Slovakia) Matej Kochan	ŽP Šport Podbrezová	8

== See also ==
- 2013–14 Slovak First Football League
- 2013–14 3. Liga (Slovakia)

=== Stats ===
- List of transfers summer 2013
