= Kévin Zonzon =

French footballer (born 1989)

Personal information
- Date of birth: 6 July 1989 (age 37)
- Place of birth: Paris, France
- Position: Midfielder

Team information
- Current team: CO Vincennes

Senior career*
Years	Team	Apps	(Gls)
–2010	Paris FC B		
2010–2012	Zemplín Michalovce	12	(0)
2012	→ Spišská Nová Ves (loan)		
2013–2018	Maccabi Paris	110+	(4+)
2018–2021	Blanc-Mesnil		
2021–	CO Vincennes		

International career
2019–	Saint Martin	4	(0)
- * Club domestic league appearances and goals

Kévin Zonzon (born 6 July 1989) is a footballer who plays as a midfielder for CO Vincennes. Born in Metropolitan France, he plays for Saint Martin team internationally. Besides France, he has played in Slovakia.

== Career ==
In 2010, Zonzon signed for Slovak second-tier side Zemplín Michalovce. Before the second half of 2011–12, he was sent on loan to Spišská Nová Ves in the Slovak third tier. Before the second half of 2012–13, Zonzon signed for French fourth tier club Maccabi Paris, where he suffered relegation to the French sixth tier. In 2018, he signed for Blanc-Mesnil in the French fifth tier. In 2021, Zonzon signed for French sixth tier team CO Vincennes.
