= Ivan Vrabec =

Slovak footballer and coach

Personal information
- Full name: Ivan Vrabec
- Date of birth: 12 October 1962 (age 64)
- Position: Defender

Team information
- Current team: Abha Club (assistant)

Senior career*
Years	Team	Apps	(Gls)
1984–1985	Petržalka	14	(0)
1987–1988	Inter Bratislava	19	(0)
1990–1992	Nitra	7	(0)

Managerial career
- 2010–2011: Nitra
- 2011–2013: Dunajská Lužná
- 2013–2015: Trenčín (assistant)
- 2016: Dunajská Lužná
- 2016–2017: Spartak Trnava (assistant)
- 2017: Senica
- 2017–2019: Slovan Bratislava (assistant)
- 2019–2021: Zagłębie Lubin (assistant)
- 2021–: Abha Club (assistant)
- * Club domestic league appearances and goals

Ivan Vrabec (born 12 October 1962) is a Slovak football coach and former player. He is the assistant manager of Abha Club, under Martin Ševela.

== Honours ==
=== Individual ===
- Fortuna Liga Manager of the season 2014-15
