= Alexander Homér =

Slovak footballer and manager

Personal information
- Full name: Alexander Homér
- Date of birth: 4 October 1970 (age 56)
- Place of birth: Czechoslovakia
- Position: Defender

Team information
- Current team: MŠK Považská Bystrica (assistant)

Youth career
- ZTS Dubnica
- → VTJ Martin (loan)

Senior career*
Years	Team	Apps	(Gls)
–2000	ZTS Dubnica		
2001–2007	Synot Staré Město	37	(0)
2002–2003	→ ZTS Dubnica (loan)	16	(0)
2003–2004	→ Trenčín (loan)	33	(0)
2005–2006	→ FC Brumov (loan)		
2007–2009	Nové Mesto		
2009	TJ Tatran Cementáreň Ladce		

Managerial career
- 2015: Borčice (assistant)
- 2016–2017: Borčice
- 2018–2019: Crystal Lednické Rovne
- 2020–2022: MŠK Považská Bystrica
- 2022–: MŠK Považská Bystrica (assistant)
- * Club domestic league appearances and goals

Alexander Homér (born 4 October 1970) is a Slovak former football player who is currently the assistant manager of MŠK Považská Bystrica.

== Playing career ==
Homér played with Synot Staré Město before returning to ZTS Dubnica in 2002.

== Managerial career ==
In the spring part of the 2015–16 season, Homér became the head coach of Iskra Borčice, after working as an assistant to Jozef Majoroš.

In 2020, Homér became the manager of 3. Liga club, MŠK Považská Bystrica. In 2022, he won the 3rd league with the club, advancing to the second division after 30 years.
