= 2015–16 3. Liga (Slovakia) =

3. Liga
- Season: 2015–16

The 2015–16 3. Liga was the 23rd 3. liga season in Slovakia since its establishment in 1993. The league was composed of 66 teams divided in four different groups of 16 each and 3. liga Západ (West) includes 18 teams. Teams are divided into four divisions: 3. liga Bratislava, 3. liga Západ (West), 3. liga Stred (Central), 3. liga Východ (Eastern), according to geographical separation.

== TIPOS III. liga Bratislava ==
=== Locations ===
2015–16 3. liga Greater Bratislava football clubs

=== League table ===
Pos	Team	Pld	W	D	L	GF	GA	GD	Pts	Promotion or relegation
1	ŠK Svätý Jur (C, P)	30	19	9	2	89	34	+55	66	Promotion to 2. Liga
2	Inter	30	18	6	6	70	21	+49	60	
3	Rohožník	30	19	3	8	65	32	+33	60	
4	FK Rača	30	14	9	7	46	37	+9	51	
5	Báhoň	30	14	9	7	46	37	+9	51	
6	Rovinka	30	15	4	11	46	37	+9	49	
7	Tomášov	30	14	5	11	46	37	+9	47	
8	Pezinok	30	12	7	11	47	46	+1	43	
9	Most pri Bratislave	30	10	10	10	43	41	+2	40	
10	Ivanka pri Dunaji	30	10	7	13	40	47	−7	37	
11	Devínska Nová Ves	30	10	6	14	43	42	+1	36	
12	Kráľová pri Senci	30	7	9	14	38	53	−15	30	
13	Bernolákovo	30	7	8	15	33	62	−29	29	
14	ŠK Lozorno	30	6	8	16	34	72	−38	26	
15	Viničné	30	6	5	19	36	87	−51	23	Relegation to 4. liga
16	Slovenský Grob	30	5	3	22	28	79	−51	18	Relegation to 4. liga

Source: III. LIGA BRATISLAVA
Rules for classification: 1) points; 2) goal difference; 3) number of goals scored.
(C) Champions; (P) Promoted

=== Top goalscorers ===
Updated through matches played on 11 June 2016.

Rank	Player	Club	Goals
1	(Slovakia) Matúš Rybanský	Sv.Jur	19
2	(Slovakia) Róbert Vaniš	Rohožník	18
3	(Slovakia) Stanislav Angelovič	Sv. Jur	17
4	(Slovakia) Marko Lörinczi	Rohožník	16
5	(Slovakia) Marek Ducký	Slovenský Grob	14

== TIPOS III. liga Západ ==
=== Locations ===
Location of teams in the 2015–16 3. Liga Západ (West)

=== League table ===
Pos	Team	Pld	W	D	L	GF	GA	GD	Pts	Promotion or relegation
1	Šamorín (C, P)	32	20	6	6	61	32	+29	66	Promotion to 2. Liga
2	Púchov	32	18	6	8	53	29	+24	60	
3	Spartak Trnava C	32	18	4	10	68	40	+28	58	
4	Veľký Meder	32	16	9	7	25	15	+10	57	
5	Nemšová	32	14	9	9	46	34	+12	51	
6	Dunajská Streda B	32	14	9	9	41	30	+11	51	
7	Horná Nitra	32	14	5	13	51	45	+6	47	
8	Veľké Ludince	32	12	11	9	44	39	+5	47	
9	Komárno	32	13	7	12	51	51	0	46	
10	Nové Zámky	32	11	9	12	43	39	+4	42	
11	Lednické Rovne	32	13	3	16	37	44	−7	42	
12	Galanta	32	12	6	14	51	60	−9	42	
13	Vráble	32	9	9	14	30	45	−15	36	
14	Topoľčany	32	9	7	16	31	55	−24	34	
15	Dubnica	32	6	12	14	27	43	−16	30	
16	Neded	32	6	9	17	40	62	−22	27	Relegation to 4. liga
17	Palárikovo	32	2	9	21	23	62	−39	15	Relegation to 4. liga
18	Gabčíkovo	0	0	0	0	0	0	0	0	Club excluded

Source: III. LIGA ZÁPAD
Rules for classification: 1) points; 2) goal difference; 3) number of goals scored.
(C) Champions; (P) Promoted

=== Top goalscorers ===
Updated through matches played on 15 June 2016.

Rank	Player	Club	Goals
1	(Slovakia) Tomáš Hlavna	Sp.Trnava C	16
2	(Slovakia) Marek Košút	Nové Zámky	15
3	(Slovakia) Ivan Pikulík	Sp.Trnava C	14
3	(Slovakia) Tomáš Farago	Komárno	14
5	(Slovakia) Marek Gajdošík	Púchov	13

== TIPOS III. liga Stred ==
=== Locations ===
Location of teams in the 2015–16 3. Liga Stred (Central)

=== League table ===
Pos	Team	Pld	W	D	L	GF	GA	GD	Pts	Promotion or relegation
1	Martin (C, P)	30	24	4	2	76	17	+59	76	Promotion to 2. Liga
2	Kremnička	30	20	2	8	62	28	+34	62	
3	Liptovský Hrádok	30	19	3	8	62	25	+37	60	
4	Žarnovica	30	19	1	10	61	52	+9	58	
5	Námestovo	30	16	5	9	52	30	+22	53	
6	Makov	30	14	4	12	64	58	+6	46	
7	Kalinovo	30	13	5	12	55	44	+11	44	
8	Podbrezová B	30	12	6	12	49	44	+5	42	
9	Liptovská Štiavnica	30	11	6	13	47	52	−5	39	
10	Čadca	30	13	3	14	45	51	−6	42	
11	Krásno nad Kysucou	30	10	7	13	39	42	−3	37	
12	Detva	30	9	7	14	46	57	−11	34	
13	Lučenec	30	9	5	16	43	55	−12	32	
14	Nová Baňa	30	9	4	17	43	56	−13	31	Relegation to 4. liga
15	Bytča	30	9	2	19	40	84	−44	29	Relegation to 4. liga
16	Pohronie B	30	0	2	28	20	109	−89	2	Relegation to 4. liga

Source: III. LIGA STRED
Rules for classification: 1) points; 2) goal difference; 3) number of goals scored.
(C) Champions; (P) Promoted

=== Top goalscorers ===
Updated through matches played on 15 June 2016.

Rank	Player	Club	Goals
1	(Slovakia) Radoslav Ďanovský	Matin	36
2	(Slovakia) Lukáš Laksík	Kremnička	21
3	(Slovakia) Ivan Šebík	Kys. Lieskovec	18
4	(Slovakia) Jozef Polka	Makov	14
4	(Serbia) Vladimir Pešić	Makov	14
5	(Slovakia) Ján Kostúrik	Kremnička	13
5	(Slovakia) Peter Ďungel	Martin	13
5	(Slovakia) Radoslav Máč	Lučenec	13

== TIPOS III. liga Východ ==
=== Locations ===
Location of teams in the 2015–16 3. Liga Východ (East)

=== League table ===
Pos	Team	Pld	W	D	L	GF	GA	GD	Pts	Promotion or relegation
1	Krásna (C)	30	24	2	4	65	18	+47	74	
2	Lipany (P)	30	20	7	3	54	17	+37	67	Promotion to 2. Liga
3	Vyšné Opátske	30	19	7	4	63	21	+42	64	
4	Stropkov	30	15	2	13	47	48	−1	47	
5	Vranov nad Topľou	30	14	4	12	34	31	+3	46	
6	Trebišov	30	12	5	13	38	53	−15	41	
7	Sabinov	30	11	7	12	38	38	0	40	
8	Bardejovská Nová Ves	30	11	6	13	49	42	+7	39	
9	Veľké Revištia	30	10	9	11	29	31	−2	39	
10	Giraltovce	30	10	8	12	38	43	−5	38	
11	Plavnica	30	10	6	14	28	37	−9	36	
12	ŠK Futura	30	9	6	15	37	44	−7	33	
13	Snina	30	9	6	15	32	42	−10	33	
14	Tatran Prešov juniori	30	10	3	17	36	49	−13	33	
15	Pušovce	30	8	8	14	29	44	−15	32	
16	Moldava nad Bodvou (R)	30	3	4	23	27	86	−59	13	Relegation to 4. liga

Source: III. LIGA VÝCHOD
Rules for classification: 1) points; 2) goal difference; 3) number of goals scored.
(C) Champions; (P) Promoted; (R) Relegated

=== Top goalscorers ===
Updated through matches played on 15 June 2016.

Rank	Player	Club	Goals
1	(Slovakia) Róbert Zeher	Krásna	22
2	(Slovakia) Mojmír Trebuňák	Vyšné Opátske	21
3	(Slovakia) Erik Burcák	Stropkov	14
3	(Slovakia) Tomáš Jusko	Lipany	14
5	(Slovakia) Matúš Lorinčák	Trebišov	13
5	(Slovakia) Radovan Bandžuch	Vyšné Opátske	13
