= Pekar =

Pekař (feminine: Pekařová) is a Czech surname. Pekár (feminine Pekárová) is a Slovak surname. In both languages the surname denotes 'baker'. Notable people with the surname include:

- Harvey Pekar (1939–2010), American underground comic book writer, music critic and media personality
- Josef Pekař (1870–1937), Czech historian
- László Pekár (born 1993), Hungarian footballer
- Matúš Pekár (born 1984), Slovak footballer
- Solomon Pekar (1917–1985), Ukrainian theoretical physicist
- Štefan Pekár (born 1988), Slovak footballer

== See also ==
- Markéta Pekarová Adamová (born 1984), Czech politician
