= Peu (footballer, born 1993) =

Brazilian footballer

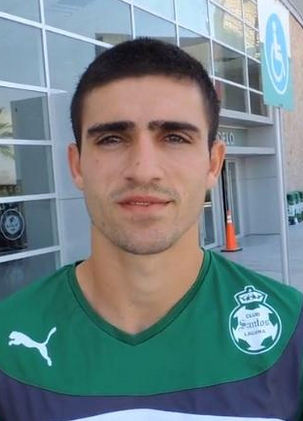
- Peu in 2014 for Santos Laguna

Personal information
- Full name: Peterson Silvino Da Cruz
- Date of birth: 24 April 1993 (age 33)
- Place of birth: Itajaí, Brazil
- Height: 1.78 m (5 ft 10 in)
- Position: Forward

Youth career
- União Navegantes
- Marcílio Dias
- AFEG Guabiruba
- Sampaio Corrêa
- Remo
- Internacional
- Avaí

Senior career*
Years	Team	Apps	(Gls)
2011–2013	Avaí	0	(0)
2013–2019	Fluminense	9	(0)
2013–2014	→ Legia Warsaw II (loan)	15	(6)
2014–2015	→ Santos Laguna (loan)	2	(0)
2016	→ Metropolitano (loan)	0	(0)
2016–2017	→ Šamorín (loan)	32	(23)
2018	→ Paysandu (loan)	0	(0)
2018–2019	→ Šamorín (loan)	19	(5)
2019–2021	Desportivo Aves	2	(0)
2021	Cascavel	7	(0)
2022	Sport Sinop		
2022	Náutico Marcílio Dias	4	(1)
2022	Singida Big Star		
2023–	Náutico Marcílio Dias	8	(0)
- * Club domestic league appearances and goals as of 16:05, 9 November 2023 (UTC)

Peterson Silvino Da Cruz (born 24 April 1993), commonly known as Peu, is a Brazilian footballer who plays as a forward.
