= Igor Kotora =

Slovak footballer

Personal information
- Full name: Igor Kotora
- Date of birth: 13 July 1989 (age 37)
- Place of birth: Nitra, Czechoslovakia
- Height: 1.76 m (5 ft 9 1/2 in)
- Position: Defender

Team information
- Current team: Zvolen
- Number: 6

Youth career
- FC Nitra
- 2005–2006: → ČFK Nitra (loan)

Senior career*
Years	Team	Apps	(Gls)
2009–2016	FC Nitra	82	(3)
2013	→ Ružiná (loan)		
2014	→ Gabčíkovo (loan)		
2016	→ Sereď (loan)	15	(0)
2016–	Zvolen	4	(0)
- * Club domestic league appearances and goals as of 29 August 2016

Igor Kotora (born 13 July 1989 in Nitra) is a Slovak football defender who currently plays for the 2. liga club MFK Lokomotíva Zvolen.
