= Ján Čirik =

Slovak footballer

Personal information
- Full name: Ján Čirik
- Date of birth: 30 December 1982 (age 43)
- Place of birth: Czechoslovakia
- Height: 1.80 m (5 ft 11 in)
- Positions: Left back; left midfielder

Team information
- Current team: FK Slovan Duslo Šaľa
- Number: 11

Youth career
- Šaľa

Senior career*
Years	Team	Apps	(Gls)
?–2008	Šaľa		
2008–2009	→Inter Bratislava loan		
2009–2010	→Trenčín loan	16	(1)
2010–	Šaľa	26	(4)
2011–2012	→Nitra loan	20	(0)
- * Club domestic league appearances and goals as of 21 July 2012

Ján Čirik (born 30 December 1982) is a Slovak football defender who currently plays for FK Slovan Duslo Šaľa. His former club was the Corgoň Liga club FC Nitra.
