= Tomáš Ďurica =

Slovak footballer

Personal information
- Date of birth: 29 January 1979 (age 47)
- Place of birth: Czechoslovakia
- Height: 1.78 m (5 ft 10 in)
- Position: Midfielder

Youth career
- Žilina

Senior career*
Years	Team	Apps	(Gls)
1996–2002	Žilina	137	(9)
2003	Dynamo Moscow	0	(0)
2004	Žilina	15	(1)
2005	Dubnica	7	(0)
2005–2006	Púchov	11	(1)
2006–2007	Močenok	14	(0)
2007–2009	Třinec	36	(2)
2009–2011	TJ Kotrčina Lúčka		
2011–?	Žilina B - Kotrčina Lúčka		
- * Club domestic league appearances and goals

Tomáš Ďurica (born 29 January 1979) is a Slovak former professional football who played as a midfielder.
