= Jaroslav Galko =

Slovak footballer manager (born 1961)

Personal information
- Date of birth: 7 January 1961 (age 65)
- Place of birth: Prešov, Czechoslovakia
- Position: Striker

Team information
- Current team: Tatran Prešov (Manager)

Youth career
- Tatran Prešov

Senior career*
Years	Team	Apps	(Gls)
- Sabinov
- Humenné
1986–1988	Prešov	30	(2)
- VSŽ Košice
- Siegendorf
	Ličartovce	0	(0)

Managerial career
- Ličartovce
- MFK Košice
- Lokomtíva Košice
- 2012–2013: MFK Košice (assistant manager)
- 2013: MFK Košice
- 2013–2014: Lokomtíva Košice
- 2014: Ružiná
- 2015: Slovan Sabinov
- 2016: VSS Košice
- 2017–2018: FK Haniska
- 2019: Tatran Prešov
- 2022-: Partizán Bardejov
- * Club domestic league appearances and goals

Jaroslav Galko (born 7 January 1961) is a Slovak football manager and former player who manages Partizán Bardejov.
