= Matúš Pekár =

Slovak footballer

Personal information
- Full name: Matúš Pekár
- Date of birth: March 16, 1984 (age 42)
- Place of birth: Bojnice, Czechoslovakia
- Height: 2.00 m (6 ft 6 1/2 in)
- Position: Striker

Team information
- Current team: Hitra FK

Youth career
- FK Junior Kanianka

Senior career*
Years	Team	Apps	(Gls)
2001–2004	Baník Prievidza		
2004–2007	Olomouc	0	(0)
2006	→ Ústí nad Labem (loan)		
2007	→ Bohemians Praha (loan)		
2007–2015	1. FC Tatran Prešov	27	(3)
2009	→ Prievidza (loan)		
2010	→ Vranov nad Topľou (loan)		
2011	→ Rimavská Sobota (loan)	29	(6)
2012	→ Veľký Šariš (loan)		
2012	→ FK Junior Kanianka (loan)		
2013–2015	→ Haniska (loan)		
2016	Haniska	26	(9)
2016–	Hitra FK		
- * Club domestic league appearances and goals as of 16 August 2016

Matúš Pekár (born 16 March 1984 in Bojnice) is a Slovak football striker who currently plays for Hitra FK in Norway.
