= FK Iskra Borčice =

Slovak football club

- Full name: FK Iskra Borčice
- Nickname(s): Mäsiari (The Butchers)
- Founded: 1951; 74 years ago
- Ground: Stadium FK Iskra Borčice, Borčice, Slovakia
- Capacity: 450
- Owner: Anton Fabuš
- President: Štefan Bobot
- Head coach: Alexander Homér
- League: 4. liga SZ Middle-West
- 2015–16: 3. liga (West), (withdrew)
- Website: http://www.iskraborcice.sk/
| Home colours | Away colours |

FK Iskra Borčice is a Slovak association football club located in Borčice. It plays in 4. liga (4th level).

== Colors and badge ==
Its colors are red and white.

== Honours ==
=== Domestic ===
- Slovak Third League (1993–)
  - Winners (1): 2014–15 (Promotion)
- Slovak Cup (1961–)
  - Quarter–finals 2017–18

== Current squad ==
As of 25 February 2018 Note: Flags indicate national team as defined under FIFA eligibility rules; some limited exceptions apply. Players may hold more than one non-FIFA nationality.

| No. | Pos. | Nation | Player |
|---|---|---|---|
| 1 | GK | (Slovakia) SVK | Peter Kosa |
| 2 | DF | (Slovakia) SVK | Marek Kočka |
| 3 | DF | (Slovakia) SVK | Jozef Decký (captain) |
| 4 | DF | (Slovakia) SVK | Róbert Petruš |
| 6 | DF | (Slovakia) SVK | Mário Machara |
| 8 | MF | (Slovakia) SVK | Martin Suchý |
| 10 | MF | (Slovakia) SVK | Miroslav Barčík |
| 11 | MF | (Slovakia) SVK | Patrik Mačina |
| 12 | FW | (Slovakia) SVK | Dominik Hasidlo |

| No. | Pos. | Nation | Player |
|---|---|---|---|
| 14 | DF | (Slovakia) SVK | Lukáš Mravec |
| 15 | DF | (Slovakia) SVK | Marek Púpala |
| 17 | DF | (Slovakia) SVK | Matej Siva |
| 20 | MF | (Slovakia) SVK | Dominik Ujlaky |
| 21 | MF | (Slovakia) SVK | Róbert Gábor |
| 29 | DF | (Slovakia) SVK | Ľuboš Hanzel |
| 30 | GK | (Slovakia) SVK | Jozef Bobot |
| 33 | GK | (Slovakia) SVK | Dominik Huňa |

For recent transfers, see List of Slovak football transfers winter 2015–16.

== Notable players ==
Had international caps for their respective countries. Players whose name is listed in bold represented their countries while playing for FK Iskra Borčice.

- (Slovakia) Miroslav Barčík
- (Slovakia) Juraj Halenár
- (Slovakia) Ľuboš Hanzel
- (Slovakia) Ján Novák

== Former coaches ==
- (Slovakia) Róbert Novák (2013 – May 2014)
- (Slovakia) Anton Dragúň (June 2014 – September 2014)
- (Slovakia) Róbert Novák (October 2014 – December 2014)
- (Slovakia) Štefan Grendel (March 2015 – July 2015)
- (Slovakia) Jozef Majoroš (July 2015–31 December 2015)
- (Slovakia) Alexander Homér (5 Jan 2016–3 March 2016)
- (Slovakia) Ivan Galád (3 March 2016 – 19 April 2016)
- (Slovakia) Alexander Homér (19 April 2016)
