= Jaroslav Kentoš =

Slovak footballer and manager

Personal information
- Full name: Jaroslav Kentoš
- Date of birth: 14 May 1974 (age 52)
- Place of birth: Vranov nad Topľou, Czechoslovakia
- Height: 1.86 m (6 ft 1 in)
- Position: Centre back

Team information
- Current team: Slovakia U21 (manager)

Senior career*
Years	Team	Apps	(Gls)
1992–1995	Tatran Prešov		
1995–1997	Maccabi Haifa		
1997	Bohemians Prague	14	(0)
1998	Slovan Bratislava		
1998–1999	Dukla Banská Bystrica		
1999–2000	Hapoel Kfar Saba	26	(1)
2000–2005	Dukla Banská Bystrica		
2001	Chemlon Humenné		
2005–2007	ŽP Šport Podbrezová		

Managerial career
- 2007–2009: ŽP Šport Podbrezová B
- 2009–2010: Dukla Banská Bystrica juniori
- 2011–2015: ŽP Šport Podbrezová
- 2015–2018: Žilina B
- 2018–2019: Žilina
- 2019–: Slovakia U21
- * Club domestic league appearances and goals

Jaroslav Kentoš (born 14 May 1974) is a former football player from Slovakia and current manager of Slovakia U21. He spent successful period of coaching as a manager of ŽP Šport Podbrezová. He played in the Gambrinus liga for Bohemians Prague.

== Honours ==
=== Manager ===
ŽS Podbrezová

- DOXXbet liga: Winners: 2013–14 (Promoted)
