= TJ Slovan Viničné =

Slovak football club

- Full name: TJ Slovan Viničné
- Founded: 1939
- Ground: Stadium Slovan Viničné, Viničné, Slovakia
- Head coach: Pavel Galambos
- League: 3. Liga
- 2013–2014: 1st (promoted)
- Website: http://www.slovanmostpribratislave.sk/

TJ Slovan Viničné is a Slovak association football club located in Viničné. It currently plays in 3. liga (3rd tier in Slovak football system). The club was founded in 1939.

== Colors and badge ==
Its colors are blue and white.
