= Vladislav Palša =

Slovak footballer

Personal information
- Full name: Vladislav Palša
- Date of birth: 8 October 1981 (age 45)
- Place of birth: Bardejov, Czechoslovakia
- Height: 1.83 m (6 ft 0 in)
- Position: Centre back

Youth career
- 1991–: JAS Bardejov

Senior career*
Years	Team	Apps	(Gls)
–2000	Bardejov		
2000–2001	Dukla Banská Bystrica		
2001–2003	Prešov		
2003–2006	Trenčín		
2006–2007	Kladno	5	(0)
2007	→ Ústí nad Labem (loan)		
2007–2009	Dukla Prague		
2009–2015	Bardejov		
2015–2019	Poprad	79	(11)

Managerial career
- 2022-: 1. FK Svidník
- * Club domestic league appearances and goals as of 29 June 2019 ‡ National team caps and goals as of 3 April 2011

Vladislav Palša (born 8 October 1981 in Bardejov) is a retired Slovak football defender.
