= OFK Dunajská Lužná =

Slovak football club

- Full name: Obecný Futbalový Klub Dunajská Lužná
- Founded: 1921; 104 years ago as FC Schildern
- Ground: NTC Dunajská Lužná
- Capacity: 500
- Chairman: Juraj Jánošík
- Head coach: Martin Vadovič
- League: 3. liga
- 2021–22: 3. liga, 9th (Bratislava)
- Website: https://www.ofkdulu.sk/
| Home colours | Away colours |

OFK Dunajská Lužná is a Slovak football team, based in the town of Dunajská Lužná. The club was founded in 1921.

== History ==
From the club's establishment in 1921, they played in various regional competitions. In 2015 they were promoted to the Slovak Second Division.

=== Events timeline ===
- 1921 – Founded as FC Schildern
- 1946 – Renamed to Jánošík Schilnder
- 1950s – Renamed to Jánošíková-Koširiská
- 2006 – Renamed to OFK Dunajská Lužná

== Current squad ==
As of 30th March 2023 Note: Flags indicate national team as defined under FIFA eligibility rules; some limited exceptions apply. Players may hold more than one non-FIFA nationality.

| No. | Pos. | Nation | Player |
|---|---|---|---|
| 1 | GK | (Slovakia) SVK | Michal Vojtech (captain) |
| 3 | DF | (Slovakia) SVK | Denis Suchánek |
| 4 | DF | (Slovakia) SVK | Michal Kmiť |
| 5 | DF | (Slovakia) SVK | Štefan Lukács |
| 6 | DF | (Slovakia) SVK | Dávid Duduc |
| 7 | MF | (Slovakia) SVK | Vojtech Bokor |
| 8 | MF | (Argentina) ARG | Leandro Pereyra |
| 9 | FW | (Georgia (country)) GEO | Hennadii Katsadze |
| 10 | MF | (Slovakia) SVK | Nino Obert |
| 11 | DF | (Slovakia) SVK | Richard Krč |
| 12 | FW | (Slovakia) SVK | Alexander Molnár |
| 13 | FW | (Slovakia) SVK | Martin Murcko |
| 15 | DF | (Slovakia) SVK | Lukáš Beňo |
| 16 | MF | (Slovakia) SVK | Rastislav Jendruš |
| 17 | MF | (Slovakia) SVK | Jakub Herzán |
| 19 | FW | (Slovakia) SVK | Erik Reindl |
| 27 | MF | (Slovakia) SVK | Jakub Kertis |
| 31 | GK | (Slovakia) SVK | Imrich Gutléber |
| 69 | FW | (Poland) POL | Tomáš Solotruk |
| 99 | GK | (Slovakia) SVK | Adam Janikovics |

== Notable managers ==
- (Slovakia) Ivan Vrabec (2011–2013)
- (Slovakia) Peter Fieber (2015–2016)
- (Slovakia) Ivan Vrabec (2016–2017)
- (Slovakia) Karol Brezík (2017–2020)
- (Slovakia) Jozef Nespešný (2020)
- (Slovakia) Marián Janšák (2020–2022)
- (Slovakia) Martin Vadovič (2022-)
