= Lukáš Šebek =

Slovak footballer

Personal information
- Full name: Lukáš Šebek
- Date of birth: 10 October 1988 (age 38)
- Place of birth: Trenčín, Czechoslovakia
- Height: 1.77 m (5 ft 10 in)
- Position: Striker

Team information
- Current team: Nové Mesto
- Number: 10

Youth career
- ?–2003: Nové Mesto
- 2003–2006: AS Trenčín

Senior career*
Years	Team	Apps	(Gls)
2005–2009	AS Trenčín	18	(0)
2009–2012	→ Nové Mesto (loan)		
2012	Spartak Myjava	10	(0)
2013	SV Leobendorf	14	(5)
2013	SC Pyhra		
2014–2017	Nové Mesto	72	(39)
2017–2018	SC Apetlon	15	(12)
2018–	Nové Mesto	38	(2)

International career
- Slovakia U-15
- Slovakia U-16
- Slovakia U-17
- Slovakia U-18
- Slovakia U-19
- Slovakia U-20
- * Club domestic league appearances and goals as of 21:29, 25 October 2020 (UTC)

Lukáš Šebek (born 10 October 1988 in Trenčín) is a Slovak football striker who currently plays for Nové Mesto.
