= FK Bodva Moldava nad Bodvou =

- Full name: Futbalový klub Bodva Moldava nad Bodvou
- Founded: 1919
- Dissolved: 2016
- Ground: Štadión Steel Slovakia aréna, Moldava nad Bodvou
- Capacity: 1,944
- 2015–16: 3. liga (East), 16th (relegated)
- Website: http://www.fkmoldava.sk
Home colours	Away colours

FK Bodva Moldava nad Bodvou was a Slovak football team, based in the town of Moldava nad Bodvou. The club was founded in 1919.

In 2016, the club was dissolved due to financial problems.

== History ==
FK Bodva Moldava nad Bodvou was initially founded in 1919. The founding members were the first club: Štefan Kocsor, Štefan Eperjesi, Štefan Pózmán, Gejza Benke, Viliam Öschläger, Ladislav Hübs, Juraj Lucz and others dedicated officers in pre-war years, such as: Štefan Dittel, Štefan Szmolnický, Gregor Bakacsi, Dr. Schürger. The first chairman was then chemist Július Blum and the first coach was the local Roman Catholic priest Štefan Eperjesi since 1925–1938. The first start in the competition organized football: 2 August 1937 PTVE Prešov – SZSC Moldava nad Bodvou 1:1. Team was accepted into the union and included in the competition for championship fights in the northern district MLSZ – Magyar Labdarúgó Szövetség. 29 April 1946 was founded a new club called "Športový klub Moldava nad Bodvou". Club plays its home games at the stadium Steel Slovakia aréna with a capacity of 2.500 seats. Before the 2. liga season 2012–13 Moldava checked out from the competition due to financial problems.

== Previous names ==
- Szepsi Testedző kör
- Moldavský telovýchovný spolok
- Szepsi Sport Club
- ŠK Moldava
- Sokol NV Moldava
- Slovan Moldava
- Traktor Moldava
- Dukla Moldava
- Jednota Moldava
- Jednota STS Moldava
- TJ Jednota Moldava
- 1. FC Moldava
- TJ Tesla Moldava
- TJ FC MSS Moldava
- ŠK Bodva Moldava nad Bodvou
- FK Bodva Moldava nad Bodvou
