= Sportika =

Italian sports equipment manufacturer

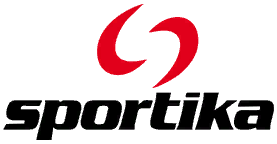
- Company type: Private
- Industry: Textile
- Founded: 1982; 44 years ago
- Founder: Carlo Crosio
- Headquarters: Ovada, Italy
- Area served: Europe
- Products: Sportswear
- Website: sportika.it

Sportika is an Italian sports equipment manufacturing company based in Ovada. The company produces sportswear, mainly football kits, t-shirts, jackets, leggins, among other products.

== History ==
Sportika was founded in 1982 by Carlo Crosio who is a sports and sportswear enthusiast from Ovada. Over the years it grew to eventually supply kits for clubs at all levels of Italian football, the Albanian Premier League, and lower-level European football clubs.
