= Luanvi =

Spanish sportswear manufacturer

- Type: Private
- Industry: Sportswear
- Founded: 1970s
- Headquarters: Paterna, Spain
- Key people: Luis, Antonio, and Vicente Tarancón
- Products: Football, basketball, equipment and apparel
- Website: Luanvi.com

Luanvi is a Spanish sportswear manufacturer, which currently produces equipment and apparel for football, basketball, handball and volleyball. Its headquarters are located in the city of Paterna, Spain.

It was founded in the early 1970s with 3 founders.

== Sponsorship ==
Luanvi has sponsored several Spanish teams from first, second and third divisions, as well as teams from Kuwait.

=== National teams ===
- None

=== Club teams ===
- (Kuwait) Al-Shabab SC
- (Kuwait) Kazma SC

=== Former teams ===
- (Spain) RCD Mallorca (1990-1992)
- (Spain) Valencia CF (1993-2000)
- (Spain) Villarreal CF (1997-1999)
- (Spain) Deportivo Alavés (1999-2002)
- (Spain) Real Zaragoza (1999-2001)
- (Spain) Levante UD (2004-2012)
- (Spain) CD Tenerife (2010-2013)
