= Stadium Družstevná pri Hornáde =

Football stadium in Slovakia

- Interactive map of Stadium Družstevná pri Hornáde
- Location: Družstevná pri Hornáde, Slovakia
- Coordinates: 48.8001°N 21.2462°E
- Owner: SIPOX, s.r.o.
- Capacity: 1000 (656 seats)
- Surface: Grass
- Field size: 105 x 68m

Construction
- Opened: 1972
- Renovated: 2014–

Tenant
- FC Lokomotíva Košice (2010–2021)

Stadium Družstevná pri Hornáde (Slovak: Štadión Družstevná pri Hornáde) is a football stadium near Košice, Slovakia, and is the home stadium of the FC Lokomotíva Košice. The stadium's capacity is 1,000 (656 seats ), including 204 seats for away fans and 50 VIP seats.
