= Adam Morong =

Slovak footballer

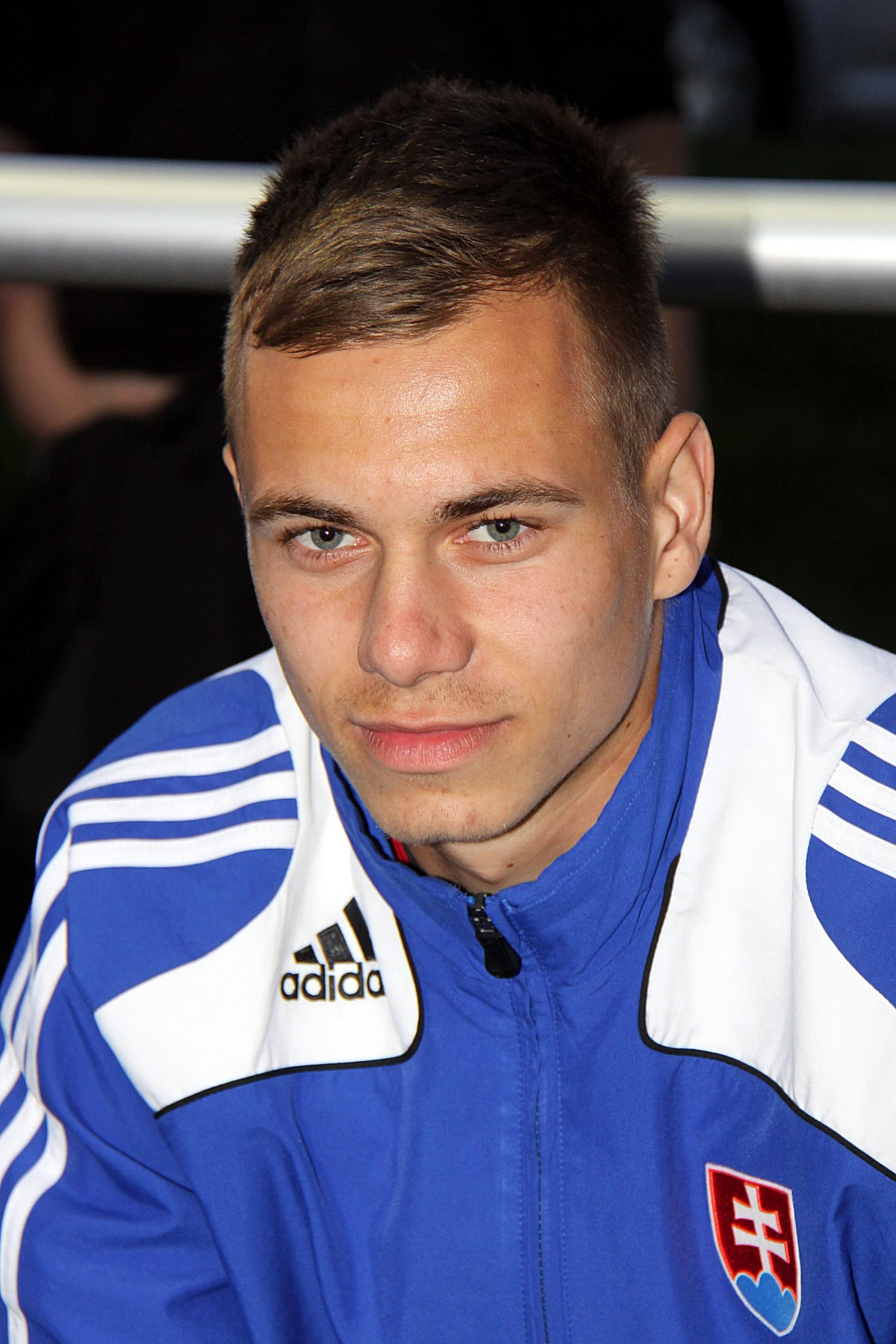

Personal information
- Full name: Adam Morong
- Date of birth: 16 June 1993 (age 33)
- Place of birth: Galanta, Slovakia
- Height: 1.78 m (5 ft 10 in)
- Position: Right midfielder

Team information
- Current team: MFK Skalica
- Number: 9

Youth career
- –2011: AS Trenčín

Senior career*
Years	Team	Apps	(Gls)
2011–2013	AS Trenčín	5	(0)
2012–2013	→ Tatran Liptovský Mikuláš (loan)	25	(2)
2013–2015	→ Sereď (loan)	30	(18)
2015	Nitra	18	(8)
2016	Senica	14	(0)
2016–2022	Orion Tip Sereď	154	(38)
2022	Ružomberok	12	(0)
2023–	MFK Skalica	99	(11)

International career
- Slovakia U18
2012	Slovakia U19	1	(0)
- * Club domestic league appearances and goals as of 21 September 2026

Adam Morong (born 16 June 1993) is a Slovak professional footballer who currently plays for MFK Skalica.

== AS Trenčín ==
He made his debut for AS Trenčín against Rimavská Sobota on 21 May 2011. In Corgoň Liga, Morong debuted on 19 November 2011 against DAC Dunajská Streda.
