= NTC Poprad =

Football stadium in Poprad, Slovakia

- Národné tréningové centrum Poprad
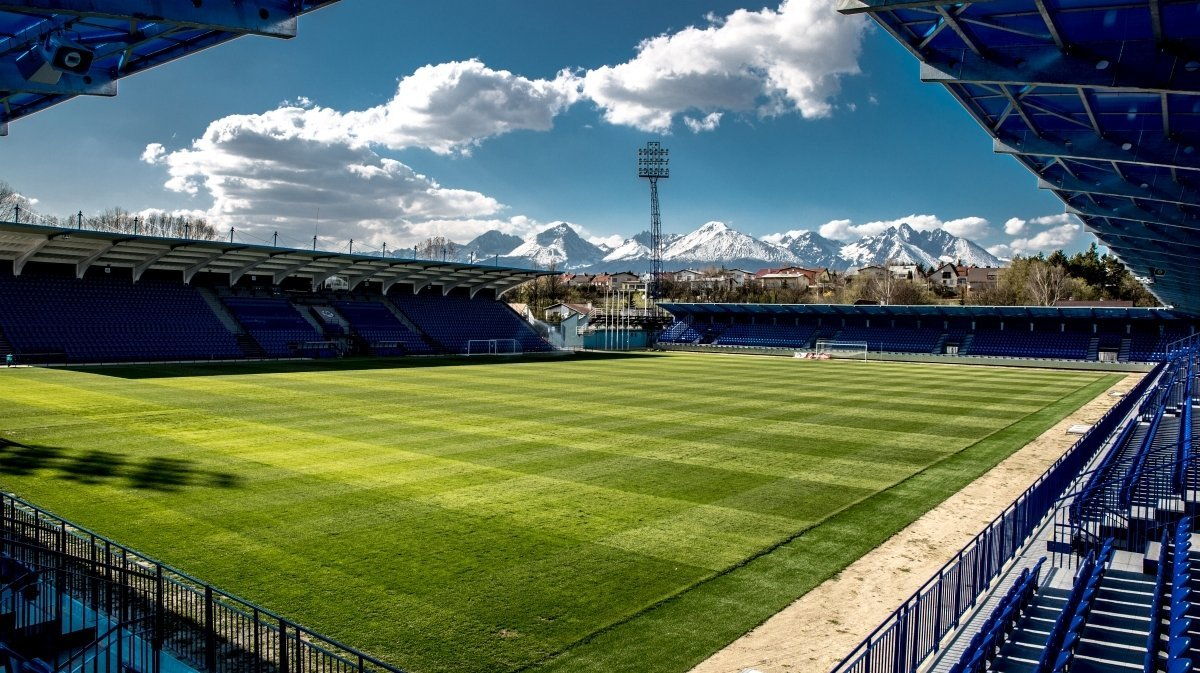
- UEFA
- Interactive map of NTC Poprad
- Full name: National Training Centre Poprad
- Location: Športová 2, Poprad, Slovakia
- Coordinates: 49°3′43″N 20°18′29″E
- Owner: Slovak football association
- Operator: SEDA
- Capacity: 5,700
- Field size: 105 x 64 m

Construction
- Opened: December 11, 2014
- Renovated: 2013–2014
- Cost: Expansion 3,34 million € in 2014

Tenants
- FK Poprad; MFK Ružomberok (2015); 1. FC Tatran Prešov (2017–2018); MFK Zemplín Michalovce (2017); Slovakia U-21 (2015–present); MFK Tatran Liptovský Mikuláš (2021–)

Website
- Official Website

National Training Centre Poprad (Slovak: Národné tréningové centrum Poprad) is a football stadium in Poprad, Slovakia. It serves as home stadium for football club FK Poprad and Slovak national football youth teams. NTC is also used by football teams for camps and international matches. The stadium has an all-seated capacity of 5,700.

== History ==
Construction of the stadium began in its in 2011, when the original stand of the Poprad stadium was completely renovated. A heated lawn was built in the area, which is heated by geothermal water from a nearby aqua park. The stadium was officially opened in 2014.

== Image gallery ==
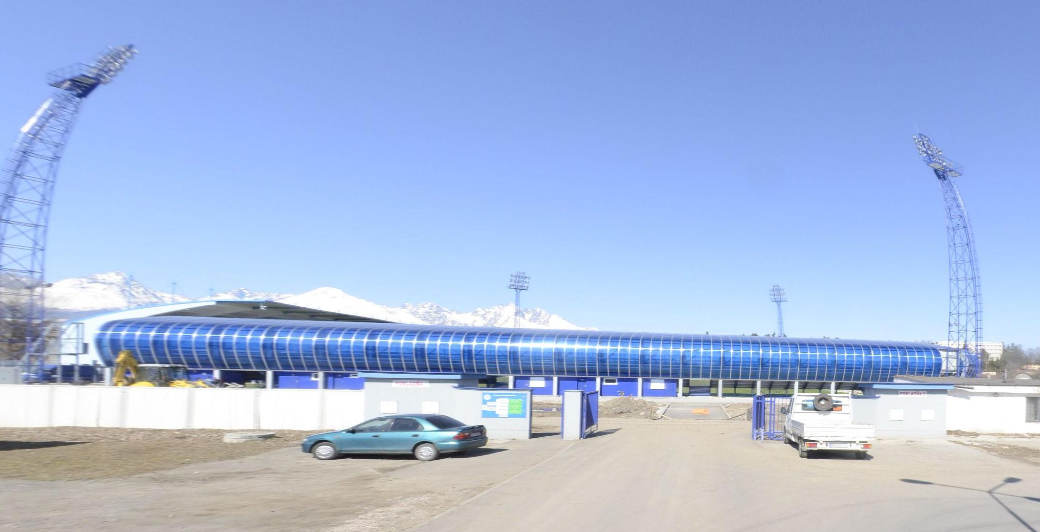
