= MŠK Fomat Martin =

Slovak football club

- Full name: Mestský športový klub Fomat Martin
- Nickname: FOMAT
- Founded: 1994; 32 years ago
- Ground: Areál Pltníky
- Capacity: 1,200
- Head coach: Pavol Šuhaj
- League: TIPOS III. liga stred
- 2025–26: 3. liga (Stred) 6th
- Website: http://www.msk.fomat.sk/
Home colours	Away colours

MŠK Fomat Martin is a Slovak football team, based in the town of Martin. The club was founded in 1994.
