= FK Slovan Duslo Šaľa =

Slovak football club

Slovan Šaľa
- Full name: FK Slovan Duslo Šaľa
- Nickname: Chemici
- Founded: 1921; 105 years ago
- Ground: Šaľa Stadium, Šaľa
- Capacity: 1,126
- President: Marián Krištof
- Manager: Miloš Foltán
- League: 3. liga
- 2025-26: 12th
- Website: http://www.fkduslosala.sk
Home colours	Away colours

FK Slovan Duslo Šaľa is a Slovak football team, based in the town of Šaľa.

== History ==
=== Early years: 1921–1946 ===
The club was founded in 1921. In 1939, the town of Šaľa belonged to Hungary and so Duslo had to play their games in the western group of the Hungarian league. In the spring of 1945, the club’s stadium was targeted by bombing and was significantly destroyed. Šaľa was liberated on March 30, 1945. Šaľa rebuilt its war-damaged sports stadium in 1946.

=== Later years ===
During the existence of Czechoslovakia, the club's greatest success was promotion to the Czechoslovak Second League, where it played from 1988 to 1993. In the 2011/2012 season, Duslo Šaľa was promoted to the Slovak Second League, having been relegated the previous season. On 6 October 2021, the club celebrated its 100th year of existence.

=== Historic names ===
- 1921 – Šaľská RTJ (Šaľská robotnícka telovýchovná jednota)
- 1921 – Šaliansky ŠK (Šaliansky športový klub)
- 1926 – Vágsellyei SC (Vágsellyei Sport Club)
- 1945 – ŠK Šaľa (Športový klub Šaľa)
- 195? – ČH Šaľa (Červená hviezda Šaľa)
- 1967 – TJ Duslo Šaľa (Telovýchovná jednota Duslo Šaľa)
- 1971 – TJ Slovan Duslo Šaľa (Telovýchovná jednota Slovan Duslo Šaľa)
- 1992 – FK Slovan Duslo Šaľa (Futbalový klub Slovan Duslo Šaľa)

== Stadium ==
Duslo Šaľa plays its home matches at the Šaľa Football Stadium, located in Šaľa. The stadium has a capacity of 8,000 spectators of which 1,126 are seated.

== Youth department ==
In 2025, the U11 category of Šaľa won the Močenok cup. Twelve teams from the districts of Nitra participated. First, they were divided into two basic groups. The final order was decided by the matches for placement. Šaľa only conceded one goal throughout the tournament.

== Notable managers ==
- (Slovakia) Vladimír Goffa (2014)
- (Slovakia) Ladislav Molnár (2014–2015)
- (Slovakia) Libor Fašiang (2015)
- (Slovakia) Peter Gergely (2015–2016)
- (Slovakia) Marián Šarmír (2023-2024)

== Women team ==
FK Slovan Duslo Šaľa
