= Stadium Liptovský Mikuláš =

Football stadium in Liptovský Mikuláš, Slovakia

- Interactive map of Stadium Liptovský Mikuláš
- Location: Liptovský Mikuláš, Slovakia
- Coordinates: 49°04.65′N 19°38.95′E
- Operator: MFK Tatran Liptovský Mikuláš
- Capacity: 1,898
- Surface: Grass
- Field size: 105 x 68 m

Construction
- Opened: 1985
- Renovated: 2018-2019
- Cost: Expansion 1,25 million € in 2018

Tenant
- MFK Tatran Liptovský Mikuláš

Stadium Liptovský Mikuláš is a home football stadium in Liptovský Mikuláš, Slovakia. It serves as home stadium for football club MFK Tatran Liptovský Mikuláš. The stadium has a capacity of 1,898. Previously has 1,950 (610 seats).
