= FK Haniska =

Slovak football club

- Full name: FK Haniska
- Founded: 1991; 35 years ago
- Ground: Štadión FK Haniska, Haniska
- Capacity: 1,000 (500 seats)
- Chairman: Daniel Mikloš
- Head coach: Jaroslav Galko
- League: 5. liga
- 2016–17: 2. liga Play-out round, 4th (relegated)

FK Haniska is a Slovak football team, based in the town of Haniska. The club was founded in 1991.

Haniska is mostly known for its time playing in the Slovak Second Division, the second highest tier of football in the country.

== History ==
The club played in regional competitions for a few years, but for most of its existence it only played in the lowest district competitions of the ObFZ Prešov, except for the years 1966-1991, when football was not even played competitively in the village at all. After advancing from the regional competitions of the Eastern Slovak Football Association (VsFZ), Haniska played in the second highest Slovak competition for two seasons. Haniska was promoted to the 4. Liga in 2011. In 2015, the club played in the Slovak Second Division. In the ended 2016/17 season, FK Haniska took last place in the relegation play-off, but its relegation was decided earlier due to the reorganization of the competition.

== Notable players ==
Had international caps for their respective countries. Players whose name is listed in bold represented their countries and playing for FK Haniska.

- (Slovakia) Jaroslav Kolbas
- (Slovakia) Robert Cicman
