= FK Spišská Nová Ves =

Slovak football club

- Full name: FK NOVES Spišská Nová Ves
- Founded: 1914; 112 years ago as ISE Igló
- Ground: Mestský štadión (Lokomotíva); Spišská Nová Ves
- Capacity: 4,000
- President: -
- Head coach: Branislav Ondáš
- League: 3. liga
- 2025–26: 3. liga, 2nd
- Website: http://www.fksnv.sk
Home colours	Away colours

FK Spišská Nová Ves is a Slovak association football team, based in the town of Spišská Nová Ves.

The club was founded in 1914 as ISE (Iglói Sport Egyesület, in Slovak translation Spišský atletický club). The club's home ground is the Municipal Stadium known as Lokomotíva with a capacity of 4,000 spectators.

== History ==
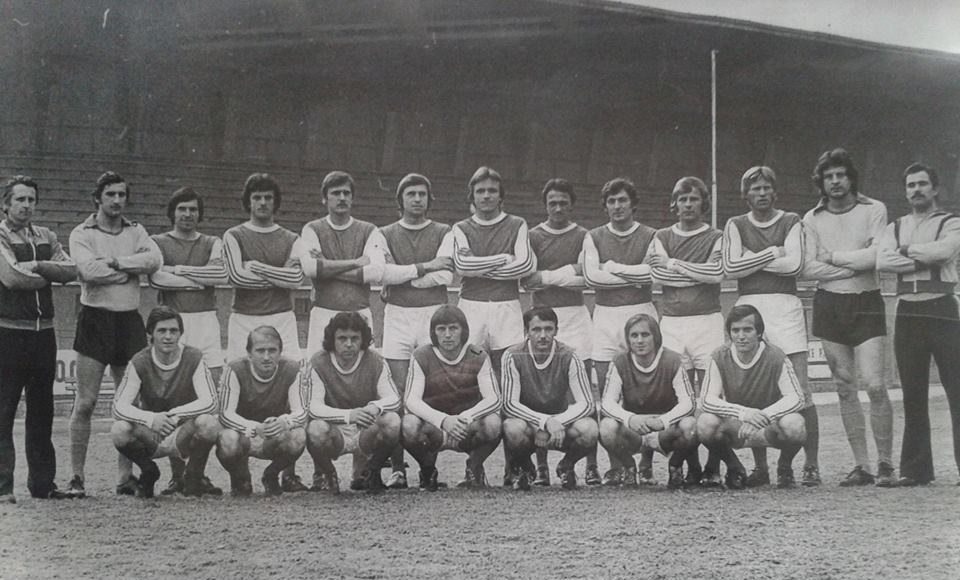
Spišská Nová Ves players in the second half of the 1970s.

The first written mention of a football match in the territory of Spišská Nová Ves dates back to May 28, 1914. Spišský atletický klub played against Lőcsei Football Sereg. Later, the AC club was founded on January 10, 1922, by merging the Hungarian ISE and the original Slovak club ŠK Tatran. This date is considered to be the founding of the first organized football club in Spiš, although no more reliable written documents have been preserved. The first football field was under Blaumont at the military training ground, the first chairman was Béla Forberger. Later, the club operated under the names ŠK Tatran, AC (ACN was founded on January 10, 1922, by merging the Hungarian ISE and the original Slovak ŠK Tatran), Sokol, Lokomotíva, Lokomotíva-Bane, AC LB, MFK Lokomotíva VTJ, FK VTJ, and now FK Spišská Nová Ves.

== Stadium ==
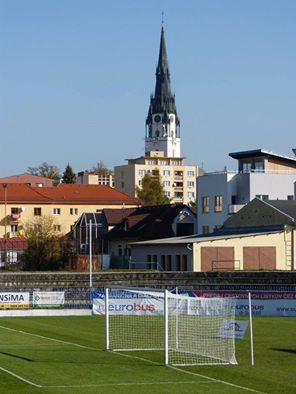
Pitch and stands in 2016.

Spišská Nová Ves hosts its home games at the Metsky stadium, which was previously known as Lokomotíva and originally had a capacity of 10,000 seats. Currently, the stadium accommodates 4,000 spectators, including 759 covered seats that were added during the 2016 renovation. Managed by the city's subsidized organization STEZ, the stadium is situated near the Hornád River and features a field with artificial turf. The existing grandstand was finished in 1968. The city's first football field was located below Blaumont (ISE). On the initiative of Václav Hollý, a sports enthusiast who later became the city's mayor, ŠK Tatran constructed its then-current field close to Hornád, adjacent to the present FK stadium. This field was originally oriented towards the city, but in 1937, the playing field was rotated 180 degrees to its current alignment.

== Previous names ==
- 1914 - ISE Igló - (Iglói Sport Egyesület) (Hungarian) (1914)
- ŠK Tatran Spišská Nová Ves (1919)
- AC (Atletický club Spišská Nová Ves) (1922)
- Sokol Spišská Nová Ves (1948)
- TJ Sokol Lokomotíva Spišská Nová Ves (1950)
- TJ Lokomotíva Spišská Nová Ves (1953)
- TJ Lokomotíva - Bane Spišská Nová Ves (1965)
- TJ AC Lokomotíva - Bane Spišská Nová Ves (1990)
- FK AC Lokomotíva - Bane Spišská Nová Ves (1993)
- MFK Lokomotíva VTJ Spišská Nová Ves (1994)
- FK VTJ Spišská Nová Ves (1998)
- FK Spišská Nová Ves (2002)
- FK NOVES Spišská Nová Ves (2017)
- FK Spišská Nová Ves (2022)

== Notable players ==
Had international caps for their respective countries. Players whose name is listed in bold represented their countries while playing for the club.. For a more exhaustive list, see Category:FK Spišská Nová Ves players.

- (Czechoslovakia) Ján Kozák
- (Czechoslovakia) František Kunzo
- (Slovakia) Jaroslav Mihalík
- (Slovakia) Erik Pačinda
- (Slovakia) Martin Polaček
- (Slovakia) Tomáš Suslov
- (Collectivity of Saint Martin) Kévin Zonzon
- (Slovakia) Vladislav Zvara
