= FK Poprad =

Slovak football club

- Full name: FK Poprad
- Founded: 1906; 120 years ago as Sport Egylet
- Ground: NTC Poprad, Poprad
- Capacity: 5,700
- Head coach: Michal Mičko
- League: 3 . liga
- 2025–26: 3. liga, 5th
- Website: http://fkpoprad.sk/
Home colours	Away colours

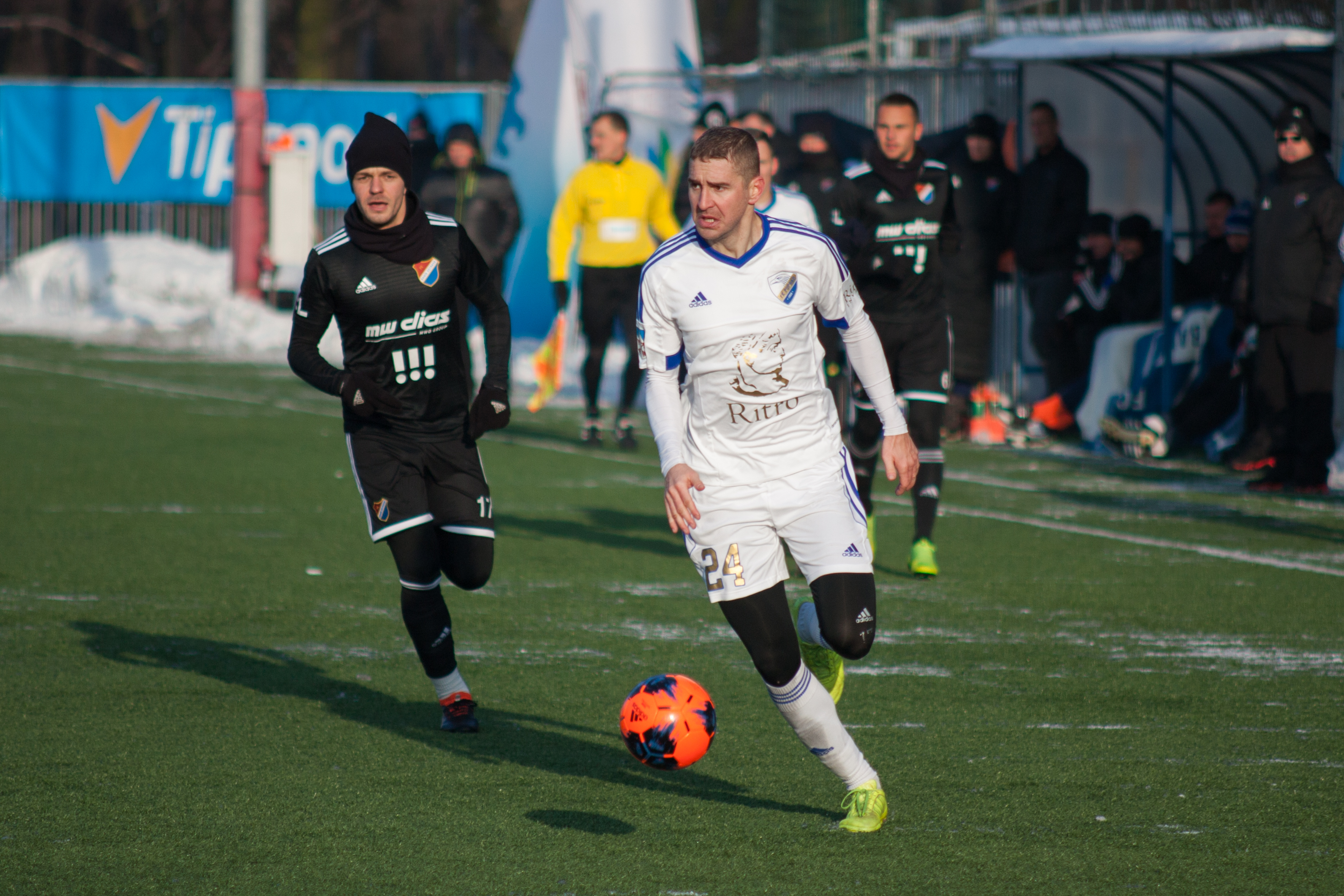
Defender Peter Maslo with FK Poprad

FK Poprad is a Slovak football team, based in the town of Poprad. The club was founded in 1906. The team plays in the 3 . liga, the third tier of Slovak football, after promotion from the 4. liga 2023-24 season. The club have played home matches at the NTC Poprad.

== History ==
FK Poprad was founded in 1906 as Poprádi Sport Egylet (Poprad Sports Club). After World War I, the club was renamed Matejov Athletic Club (MAC). In the following years, the club underwent several drastic name changes, such as: Spartak, LVS, Vagónka or 1. FC.

In the 1964/65 season, it won the Regional Championship and was promoted to the 2 Division, all under the name LVS Poprad (Lokomotíva-Vagónka-Stavbár). The club stayed in the division for four years, then was promoted to the 1. SNFL (specifically in the 1979/80 season). The Poprad team was relegated from it in the 1984/85 season. The club then experienced its later years only at the regional level.

In 2001, the club was in a difficult financial situation, which was only averted by a merger with TJ Tatramat Matejovce. The team entered the 2001/02 season under the new name 1. PFC Tatramat Poprad. Two years later, Tatramat ended its sponsorship of Poprad football. These steps put Poprad football in a very difficult situation. It was only resolved in 2004 after the merge with FC Tatran Poprad-Veľká. In the 2013/14 season, they were promoted to the 2nd Slovak League. The club currently plays in the 3rd division of Slovakia.

=== Historic names ===
- 1906 – Founded as Sport Egylet
- 1909 – Renamed Matejovský atletický klub (MAC)
- 1939 – Renamed Slovenský atletický klub – SAC
- 1945 – Renamed ŠK SSM
- 1951 – Renamed Spartak Poprad
- 1974 – Renamed TJ Tatramat Poprad
- 1975 – Renamed TJ Vagónka Poprad
- 2001 – merged with PFC Poprad into 1. PFC Tatramat
- 2004 – Renamed 1. PFC Poprad
- 2005 – merged with FC Tatran Poprad-Veľká into MFK Poprad
- 2008 – Renamed FK Aquacity Poprad
- 2010 – Renamed FK Poprad

== Rivals ==
FK Poprad’s biggest rival is the neighboring club 1. MFK Kežmarok. Matches between the teams are called the Podtatranské derby and is considered one of the biggest matches in the lower leagues.

== Honours ==
- Slovak Cup (1961–Present)
  - Semi-finals (1): 2016–17

== Sponsorship ==
Period	Kit manufacturer	Shirt sponsor
2007-08	Legea	AquaCity
2008-2010	Adidas	AquaCity
2010–2016	Adidas	none
2016-	Adidas	Ritro

== Players ==
=== Current squad ===
Updated 21 November 2021 Note: Flags indicate national team as defined under FIFA eligibility rules; some limited exceptions apply. Players may hold more than one non-FIFA nationality.

No.	Pos.	Nation	Player
21	GK	SVK	Ivan Rehák
30	GK	SVK	Ján Malec
31	GK	SVK	Filip Dlubáč
81	GK	SVK	Dávid Straka
2	DF	SVK	Matej Grešák
6	DF	SVK	Patrik Gajan
14	DF	SVK	Milan Ondruš
16	DF	SVK	Roman Pazúr
17	DF	SVK	René Paraj (on loan from Železiarne Podbrezová)
18	DF	POL	Jakub Zabawa
18	DF	SVK	Nicolas Šikula
20	DF	SVK	Tomáš Lajčák
2	MF	SVK	Vladimír Barbora
2	MF	SVK	Dávid Legnavský
3	MF	SVK	Patrik Živčák
6	MF	SVK	Tobias Raffay (on loan from Železiarne Podbrezová)
7	MF	SVK	Adam Matalík

No.	Pos.	Nation	Player
8	MF	POL	Krzysztof Wojtanek
10	MF	SVK	Andrej Pollák
11	MF	SVK	Pavol Bryndza
12	MF	NGA	Usman Adekunle Issa (on loan from Železiarne Podbrezová)
13	MF	SVK	Patrik Vaščák
15	MF	POL	Marek Kapral
16	MF	SVK	Samuel Aurel Kopáč
16	MF	SVK	Patrik Hanes
16	MF	SVK	Sebastián Kuzár
17	MF	SVK	Ľubomír Kubis
18	MF	SVK	Dávid Weiss
19	MF	SVK	Marián Dzurjo
5	FW	GEO	Davit Natchkebia (on loan from Železiarne Podbrezová)
6	FW	RUS	Ivan Timoshenko (on loan from Železiarne Podbrezová)
9	FW	SVK	Marek Barnáš
11	FW	SVK	Timotej Zummer

==== Out on loan ====
Note: Flags indicate national team as defined under FIFA eligibility rules; some limited exceptions apply. Players may hold more than one non-FIFA nationality.

No.	Pos.	Nation	Player
—	MF	SVK	Samuel Kuba (on loan to Slavoj Trebišov)
—	DF	SVK	Sebastián Jurčišin (on loan to Slavoj Trebišov)

No.	Pos.	Nation	Player
—	MF	SVK	Sven Jurčišin (on loan to Dukla Banská Bystrica)

=== Notable players ===
Had international caps for their respective countries. Players whose name is listed in bold represented their countries while playing for FK.

Past (and present) players who are the subjects of Wikipedia articles can be found here.

- (Cyprus) Alekos Alekou
- (Czechoslovakia) Koloman Gögh
- (Slovakia) Kamil Kopúnek
- (Slovakia) Tomáš Rigo
- (Czechoslovakia) Juraj Szikora
- (Trinidad and Tobago) Kathon St. Hillaire
- (Slovakia) Stanislav Šesták

== Reserve team ==
FK Poprad B was the reserve team of FK Poprad. They last played in the third-level football league in Slovakia 3. Liga (East).

== Staff ==
=== Current technical staff ===
Updated 25 May 2019

Staff	Job title
(Slovakia) Vladimír Lajčák	Manager
(Slovakia) Milan Ondruš	Assistant manager
(Slovakia) Ján Malec	Goalkeeping coach
(Slovakia) Juraj Kšenzakovič	Team Leader
(Slovakia) MUDr. Jaroslav Južanin	Team Doctor
(Slovakia) Dárius Kolodzej	Masseur

=== Managers ===
- (Slovakia) Vladimír Lajčák (2010–2015)
- (Slovakia) Pavol Mlynár (2015–2016)
- (Czech Republic) František Šturma (2016–2017)
- (Slovakia) Jaroslav Belejčák (2017–2019)
- (Slovakia) Marek Petruš (11/2019)
- (Slovakia) Peter Ďuriš (11/2019-01/2020) (interim)
- (Slovakia) Jaroslav Belejčák (01/2020-07/2020)
- (Slovakia) Stanislav Ďuriš (07/2020-11/2020)
- (Slovakia) Jaroslav Rybár (12/2020)
- (Slovakia) Ján Guziar (01/2021-05/2021)
- (Slovakia) Vladimír Lajčák (07/2021-)
