= AFC Nové Mesto nad Váhom =

Slovak football club

- Full name: AFC Nové Mesto nad Váhom
- Founded: 1922; 104 years ago
- Ground: Areál AFC Považan, Nové Mesto nad Váhom
- Capacity: 4,500
- Chairman: Dušan Današ
- Head coach: Miroslav Karhan
- League: 3. liga
- 2017–18: 2. liga, 13th (relegated)
- Website: http://afcpovazan.sklub.eu/
Home colours	Away colours

AFC Nové Mesto nad Váhom is a Slovak football team, based in the town of Nové Mesto nad Váhom. The club was founded in 1922.

== Notable players ==
The following AFC Nové Mesto players had international caps for their respective countries. Players whose name is listed in bold represented their countries while playing for Slovan.

Past (and present) players who are the subjects of Wikipedia articles can be found here.

- (Central African Republic) Alias Lembakoali
