= List of Slovak football transfers summer 2014 =

Notable Slovak football transfers in the summer transfer window 2014 by club. Only transfers of the Fortuna Liga and 2. liga are included.

== Fortuna Liga ==
=== ŠK Slovan Bratislava ===
In: Note: Flags indicate national team as defined under FIFA eligibility rules; some limited exceptions apply. Players may hold more than one non-FIFA nationality.

No.	Pos.	Nation	Player
—	DF	CZE	Tomáš Jablonský (from (Czech Republic) FK Baumit Jablonec)
—	DF	SVK	Erik Čikoš (loan return from (Scotland) Ross County F.C.)
—	GK	SVK	Matúš Putnocký (loan return from FC Nitra)
—	MF	SVK	Matej Jakúbek (loan return from FK DAC 1904 Dunajská Streda)
—	MF	SVK	Richard Lásik (from (Italy) Brescia Calcio)
—	MF	SVK	Samuel Štefánik (from (Netherlands) N.E.C. Nijmegen)
—	FW	SVK	František Kubík (from FK AS Trenčín)
—	DF	SVK	Kornel Saláta (from (Russia) Tom Tomsk)

Out: Note: Flags indicate national team as defined under FIFA eligibility rules; some limited exceptions apply. Players may hold more than one non-FIFA nationality.

No.	Pos.	Nation	Player
—	MF	SVK	Patrik Sabo (on loan to FC ViOn Zlaté Moravce)
—	MF	CZE	Jiří Kladrubský (to (Czech Republic) SK Dynamo České Budějovice)
—	FW	SVK	Alan Kováč (on loan to FK DAC 1904 Dunajská Streda)
—	MF	SVK	Filip Hlohovský (to FK Senica)
—	DF	SVK	Kornel Saláta (on loan to FC DAC 1904 Dunajská Streda)

=== FK AS Trenčín ===
In: Note: Flags indicate national team as defined under FIFA eligibility rules; some limited exceptions apply. Players may hold more than one non-FIFA nationality.

No.	Pos.	Nation	Player
—	FW	SVK	František Kubík (from (Greece) Ergotelis F.C.)
—	MF	SVK	Stanislav Lobotka (loan return from (Netherlands) AFC Ajax)
—	GK	SVK	Adrián Chovan (loan return from AFC Nové Mesto nad Váhom)
—	MF	NGA	Rabiu Ibrahim (from (Scotland) Kilmarnock F.C.)
—	MF	ENG	James Lawrence (from (Netherlands) RKC Waalwijk)
—	FW	NGA	Emmanuel Edmond (from (Nigeria) GBS Academy)
—	FW	SVK	Dávid Guba (on loan from MŠK Žilina)

Out: Note: Flags indicate national team as defined under FIFA eligibility rules; some limited exceptions apply. Players may hold more than one non-FIFA nationality.

No.	Pos.	Nation	Player
—	FW	NED	Gino van Kessel (loan return to (Netherlands) AFC Ajax)
—	FW	SVK	Roman Sabler (loan return to ŠK SFM Senec)
—	DF	SVK	Mário Tóth (loan return to ŠK SFM Senec)
—	MF	SVK	Lukáš Ďuriška (to (Czech Republic) MFK Frýdek-Místek)
—	MF	SVK	Marek Frimmel (on loan to FK Slovan Nemšová)
—	FW	SVK	Gabriel Bezák (to TBA)
—	FW	SVK	Martin Jurica (on loan to ŠKF Sereď)
—	DF	SVK	Michal Ranko (on loan to FK Slovan Nemšová)
—	MF	ARG	Aldo Baéz (to (Czech Republic) SK Slavia Prague)
—	FW	SVK	Tomáš Malec (to (Norway) Rosenborg BK)
—	FW	SVK	František Kubík (to ŠK Slovan Bratislava)
—	GK	SVK	Miloš Volešák (to MŠK Žilina)
—	MF	SVK	Damián Bariš (on loan to AFC Nové Mesto nad Váhom)

=== FC Spartak Trnava ===
In: Note: Flags indicate national team as defined under FIFA eligibility rules; some limited exceptions apply. Players may hold more than one non-FIFA nationality.

No.	Pos.	Nation	Player
—	DF	SVK	Matúš Čonka (from (Czech Republic) SK Slavia Prague)
—	DF	SVK	Matej Siva (from Spartak Myjava)
—	DF	SVK	Milan Bortel (from (Czech Republic) SK Slavia Prague)
—	DF	SVK	Martin Klabník (loan return from FK DAC 1904 Dunajská Streda)
—	MF	SVK	Miroslav Kasaj (from ŠKF Sereď)
—	MF	SVK	Nikolas Špalek (from FC Nitra)
—	MF	SVK	Tomáš Mikinič (loan return from (Czech Republic) SK Slovan Varnsdorf)
—	MF	ESP	José Casado (from TJ OFC Gabčíkovo)
—	MF	BRA	Cléber Nascimento da Silva (from FC Nitra)
—	FW	SRB	Stefan Durić (from (Serbia) FK Sloboda Užice)
—	DF	SVK	Lukáš Greššák (from MFK Ružomberok)
—	FW	SVK	Erik Jendrišek (from (Germany) FC Energie Cottbus)
—	FW	MLT	Jean Paul Farrugia (on loan from (Malta) Hibernians F.C.)

Out: Note: Flags indicate national team as defined under FIFA eligibility rules; some limited exceptions apply. Players may hold more than one non-FIFA nationality.

No.	Pos.	Nation	Player
—	MF	SVK	Roman Procházka (loan return to (Bulgaria) PFC Levski Sofia)
—	MF	SVK	Radoslav Ciprys (to Spartak Myjava)
—	MF	SVK	Peter Kuračka (Released)
—	FW	SVK	Andrej Hodek (to (Austria) ASK Mannersdorf)
—	FW	NGA	Peter Nworah (to FO ŽP Šport Podbrezová)
—	DF	SVK	Michal Habánek (to MFK Ružomberok)
—	MF	SVK	Michal Gašparík (Released)
—	MF	SVK	Oliver Augustíni (Released)
—	GK	SVK	Miroslav Filipko (Released)
—	DF	SVK	Martin Klabník (on loan to TJ OFC Gabčíkovo)
—	MF	SVK	Tomáš Mikinič (on loan to FC ViOn Zlaté Moravce)
—	MF	SVK	Ján Chovanec (on loan to (Poland) Ruch Chorzów)

=== MFK Ružomberok ===
In: Note: Flags indicate national team as defined under FIFA eligibility rules; some limited exceptions apply. Players may hold more than one non-FIFA nationality.

No.	Pos.	Nation	Player
—	FW	SVK	Boris Turčák (from ŠK Slovan Bratislava)
—	GK	SVK	Matej Šavol (on loan from MFK Tatran Liptovský Mikuláš)
—	MF	SVK	Erik Liener (from (Czech Republic) 1. SC Znojmo)
—	MF	SVK	Róbert Vaniš (from ŠK Slovan Bratislava)
—	DF	SVK	Michal Habánek (from FC Spartak Trnava)
—	DF	SVK	Martin Mečiar (on loan from FC Spartak Trnava)
—	MF	SVK	Lukáš Janič (on loan from MFK Zemplín Michalovce)
—	GK	SVK	Matúš Putnocký (on loan from ŠK Slovan Bratislava)
—	FW	CRO	Armando Mance (from (Croatia) HNK Rijeka)

Out: Note: Flags indicate national team as defined under FIFA eligibility rules; some limited exceptions apply. Players may hold more than one non-FIFA nationality.

No.	Pos.	Nation	Player
—	DF	SVK	Peter Maslo (to (Poland) Termalica Bruk-Bet Nieciecza)
—	GK	SVK	Pavel Kováč (to FC ViOn Zlaté Moravce)
—	GK	SRB	Milorad Nikolić (Released)
—	MF	SVK	Tomáš Ďubek (to (Czech Republic) FC Slovan Liberec)
—	DF	SRB	Goran Adamović (Released)
—	MF	CMR	Léandre Tawamba (to (Libya) Al-Ahly Benghazi SC)
—	MF	SVK	Štefan Zošák (to (Libya) Al-Ahly Benghazi SC)
—	FW	SVK	Filip Serečin (to TBA)
—	DF	SVK	Lukáš Greššák (to FC Spartak Trnava)

=== MFK Košice ===
In: Note: Flags indicate national team as defined under FIFA eligibility rules; some limited exceptions apply. Players may hold more than one non-FIFA nationality.

No.	Pos.	Nation	Player
—	FW	SVN	Ajdin Redzić (from (Slovenia) NK Triglav Kranj)
—	GK	BIH	Nikola Stijaković (from (Bosnia and Herzegovina) NK Zvijezda Gradačac)
—	FW	SVK	Dávid Škutka (on loan from (Czech Republic) SK Slavia Prague)

Out: Note: Flags indicate national team as defined under FIFA eligibility rules; some limited exceptions apply. Players may hold more than one non-FIFA nationality.

No.	Pos.	Nation	Player

=== FK Senica ===
In: Note: Flags indicate national team as defined under FIFA eligibility rules; some limited exceptions apply. Players may hold more than one non-FIFA nationality.

No.	Pos.	Nation	Player
—	DF	SVK	Róbert Pillár (loan return from FC Nitra)
—	MF	SVK	Filip Hlohovský (from ŠK Slovan Bratislava)
—	MF	CZE	Luboš Hušek (from (Czech Republic) FC Slovan Liberec)
—	FW	SVK	Tomáš Majtán (from (Poland) Górnik Zabrze)
—	FW	COD	Mulumba Mukendi (from (Russia) FC Volga Nizhny Novgorod)

Out: Note: Flags indicate national team as defined under FIFA eligibility rules; some limited exceptions apply. Players may hold more than one non-FIFA nationality.

No.	Pos.	Nation	Player
—	GK	SVK	Pavel Kamesch (Released)
—	MF	BRA	Cristovam (loan return to (Brazil) Arapongas Esporte Clube)
—	DF	UKR	Andriy Slinkin (loan return to (Ukraine) FC Chornomorets Odesa)
—	FW	BRA	Hiago de Oliveira Ramiro (loan return to (Brazil) Arapongas Esporte Clube)
—	MF	CZE	Milan Jirásek (loan return to (Czech Republic) AC Sparta Prague)
—	FW	SVK	Milan Ferenčík (Released)
—	FW	NGA	Christian Irobiso (Released)
—	FW	URU	Sebastián Sosa (loan return to (Italy) U.S. Città di Palermo)

=== Spartak Myjava ===
In: Note: Flags indicate national team as defined under FIFA eligibility rules; some limited exceptions apply. Players may hold more than one non-FIFA nationality.

No.	Pos.	Nation	Player
—	MF	SVK	Radoslav Ciprys (from FC Spartak Trnava)
—	DF	SVK	Peter Jánošík (from ŠK Slovan Bratislava)
—	FW	SVK	Marek Kuzma (from ŠK Slovan Bratislava)
—	FW	SVK	Peter Sládek (loan return from (Belgium) K.V. Oostende)
—	GK	SVK	Lukáš Urminský (from MFK Dubnica)
—	DF	SVK	Ivan Múdry (from MFK Dubnica)
—	DF	SVK	Denis Švec (from MFK Dubnica)
—	DF	SVK	Richard Čiernik (from MFK Dubnica)
—	FW	SVK	Roman Sirota (on loan from TJ Záhoran Kostolište)
—	DF	SVK	Jakub Kastelovič (from (Czech Republic) FC Slovan Liberec)
—	FW	SVK	Arnold Šimonek (on loan from (Czech Republic) FC Vysočina Jihlava)

Out: Note: Flags indicate national team as defined under FIFA eligibility rules; some limited exceptions apply. Players may hold more than one non-FIFA nationality.

No.	Pos.	Nation	Player
—	GK	SVK	Erik Jurica (Released)
—	DF	SVK	Lukáš Bruško (Released)
—	DF	SVK	Ondrej Neoveský (Released)
—	MF	SVK	Matej Kováč (Released)
—	FW	SVK	Ľubomír Urgela (Released)
—	DF	SVK	Matej Siva (to FC Spartak Trnava)
—	DF	SVK	Peter Kumančík (End of professional career due to health problems)
—	MF	SVK	Peter Šulek (to (Czech Republic) FC Vysočina Jihlava)

=== FK Dukla Banská Bystrica ===
In: Note: Flags indicate national team as defined under FIFA eligibility rules; some limited exceptions apply. Players may hold more than one non-FIFA nationality.

No.	Pos.	Nation	Player
—	MF	CZE	Nicolas Šumský (from (Czech Republic) Bohemians 1905)
—	FW	SVK	Jozef Dolný (on loan from 1. FC Tatran Prešov)
—	MF	CZE	Petr Wojnar (on loan from (Czech Republic) FK Mladá Boleslav)
—	DF	SVK	Patrik Banovič (on loan from FC Spartak Trnava)
—	MF	SVK	Peter Lipták (on loan from 1. FC Tatran Prešov)
—	FW	SVK	Peter Mazan (from FK AS Trenčín)

Out: Note: Flags indicate national team as defined under FIFA eligibility rules; some limited exceptions apply. Players may hold more than one non-FIFA nationality.

No.	Pos.	Nation	Player
—	MF	SVK	Martin Chrien (to (Czech Republic) FC Viktoria Plzeň)
—	MF	SVK	Jakub Považanec (to (Czech Republic) FK Dukla Prague)
—	DF	SVK	Ján Nosko (loan return to ŽP Šport Podbrezová)
—	MF	CZE	Jan Kliment (loan return to (Czech Republic) FC Vysočina Jihlava)
—	DF	SVK	Dionatan Teixeira (to (England) Stoke City F.C.)
—	DF	SVK	Matej Podstavek (to (Czech Republic) SK Dynamo České Budějovice)
—	FW	SVK	Fabián Slančík (to (Czech Republic) FC Zbrojovka Brno)

=== FC ViOn Zlaté Moravce ===
In: Note: Flags indicate national team as defined under FIFA eligibility rules; some limited exceptions apply. Players may hold more than one non-FIFA nationality.

No.	Pos.	Nation	Player
—	MF	SVK	Patrik Sabo (on loan from ŠK Slovan Bratislava)
—	MF	SVK	Július Szöke (on loan from ŽP Šport Podbrezová)
—	MF	SRB	Miloš Nikolić (from (Serbia) FK Sloga Kraljevo)
—	MF	SRB	Dušan Đuričić (from (Serbia) FK IMT Novi Beograd)
—	GK	SVK	Pavel Kováč (from MFK Ružomberok)
—	FW	COD	Elvis Mashike Sukisa (on loan from MFK Lokomotíva Zvolen)
—	DF	SVK	Marián Štrbák (on loan from (Czech Republic) FK MAS Táborsko)
—	DF	SVK	Milan Mujkoš (on loan from FK Slovan Duslo Šaľa)
—	MF	SVK	Róbert Valenta (from FK DAC 1904 Dunajská Streda)
—	MF	SVK	Peter Ďurica (from (Thailand) Sisaket F.C.)
—	DF	SVK	Juraj Pilát (loan return from FK Púchov)
—	MF	SRB	Branislav Stanić (from (Kyrgyzstan) FC Dordoi Bishkek)
—	MF	SVK	Patrik Gregora (from (Norway) Stord Sunnhordland FK)
—	MF	SVK	Tomáš Mikinič (on loan from FC Spartak Trnava)

Out: Note: Flags indicate national team as defined under FIFA eligibility rules; some limited exceptions apply. Players may hold more than one non-FIFA nationality.

No.	Pos.	Nation	Player
—	GK	SVK	Martin Kuciak (Released)
—	MF	SVK	Martin Pribula (loan return to 1. FC Tatran Prešov)
—	FW	SVK	Lukáš Szabo (loan return to (Czech Republic) FC Slovan Liberec)
—	DF	SVK	Peter Chrappan (to (Germany) 1. FC Saarbrücken)
—	DF	SVK	Pavol Majerník (to MFK Skalica)
—	MF	BRA	Bolinha (loan return to FK Senica)
—	MF	SVK	Martin Babic (Released)
—	DF	SVK	Adrián Candrák (to (Austria) UFC St. Georgen/Eisenstadt)
—	FW	SVK	Ladislav Žák (on loan to ŠK Svätý Jur)
—	FW	BIH	Irfan Hadžić (to (Serbia) )

=== MŠK Žilina ===
In: Note: Flags indicate national team as defined under FIFA eligibility rules; some limited exceptions apply. Players may hold more than one non-FIFA nationality.

No.	Pos.	Nation	Player
—	DF	BIH	Bojan Letić (from (Bosnia and Herzegovina) FK Velež Mostar)
—	GK	SVK	Miloš Volešák (from FK AS Trenčín)

Out: Note: Flags indicate national team as defined under FIFA eligibility rules; some limited exceptions apply. Players may hold more than one non-FIFA nationality.

No.	Pos.	Nation	Player
—	FW	SVK	Pavol Jurčo (Released)
—	MF	BEN	Bello Babatounde (to (Czech Republic) FC Vysočina Jihlava)
—	FW	SVK	Dávid Guba (on loan to FK AS Trenčín)

=== FC DAC 1904 Dunajská Streda ===
In: Note: Flags indicate national team as defined under FIFA eligibility rules; some limited exceptions apply. Players may hold more than one non-FIFA nationality.

No.	Pos.	Nation	Player
—	DF	SVK	Mário Tóth (from ŠK SFM Senec)
—	FW	SVK	Roman Sabler (from ŠK SFM Senec)
—	FW	SVK	Roland Černák (from FK Slavoj Trebišov)
—	MF	SVK	Vojtech Horváth (from (Poland) LKS Nieciecza)
—	DF	SVK	Peter Struhár (from (Hungary) Lombard-Pápa TFC)
—	MF	SVK	Goran Antunovič (on loan from KFC Komárno)
—	DF	SVK	Kornel Saláta (on loan from ŠK Slovan Bratislava)
—	MF	SVK	Peter Štepanovský ( (Armenia) from FC Banants)
—	MF	SRB	Miroslav Stanić (on loan from ŠK Senec)

Out: Note: Flags indicate national team as defined under FIFA eligibility rules; some limited exceptions apply. Players may hold more than one non-FIFA nationality.

No.	Pos.	Nation	Player
—	DF	SVK	Martin Klabník (loan return to FC Spartak Trnava)
—	MF	SVK	Matej Jakúbek (loan return to ŠK Slovan Bratislava)
—	MF	SVK	Roman Gergel (loan return to MŠK Žilina)
—	MF	SVK	Róbert Valenta (loan return to FC Nitra)
—	FW	SVK	Martin Matúš (loan return to FK REaMOS Kysucký Lieskovec)
—	DF	CRO	Andrej Čaušić (Released)
—	MF	CMR	Paul Boya (Released)
—	FW	TUN	Nizar Ben Nasra (Released)
—	DF	AUT	Taner Ari (Released)
—	FW	SRB	Samir Nurković (loan return to MFK Košice)
—	MF	SVK	Tamás Lénárth (on loan to ŠK SFM Senec)
—	DF	SVK	Zoltán Ágh (on loan to ŠK SFM Senec)
—	FW	SVK	Alan Kováč (on loan to ŠK SFM Senec)

=== ŽP Šport Podbrezová ===
In: Note: Flags indicate national team as defined under FIFA eligibility rules; some limited exceptions apply. Players may hold more than one non-FIFA nationality.

No.	Pos.	Nation	Player
—	DF	SVK	Ján Nosko (loan return from FK Dukla Banská Bystrica)
—	FW	SVK	Dominik Kunca (on loan from MFK Zemplín Michalovce)
—	GK	SVK	Andrej Maťašovský (on loan from MFK Dubnica)
—	MF	SVK	Juraj Hovančík (from MFK Košice)
—	FW	NGA	Peter Nworah (from FC Spartak Trnava)
—	MF	SVK	Peter Gál-Andrezly (from MFK Košice)
—	MF	SVK	Kamil Karaš (from (Czech Republic) SK Sigma Olomouc)

Out: Note: Flags indicate national team as defined under FIFA eligibility rules; some limited exceptions apply. Players may hold more than one non-FIFA nationality.

No.	Pos.	Nation	Player
—	FW	NGA	Hector Tubonemi (on loan to MFK Zemplín Michalovce)
—	MF	SVK	Július Szöke (on loan to FC ViOn Zlaté Moravce)
—	FW	SVK	Michal Mózer (on loan to MFK Tatran Liptovský Mikuláš)
—	DF	SVK	Ivan Očenáš (on loan to FK Pohronie)
—	DF	SVK	Stanislav Morháč (Released)
—	FW	SVK	Tomáš Čekovský (to TBA)
—	FW	SVK	Dominik Kunca (early loan return to MFK Zemplín Michalovce)

== DOXXbet liga ==
=== West ===
==== FC Nitra ====
In: Note: Flags indicate national team as defined under FIFA eligibility rules; some limited exceptions apply. Players may hold more than one non-FIFA nationality.

No.	Pos.	Nation	Player
—	MF	SVK	Marek Kostoláni (from (Austria) ASK Mannersdorf)
—	DF	SVK	Marián Kolmokov (loan return from FK Slovan Duslo Šaľa)
—	FW	SVK	Matúš Paukner (loan return from TJ OFC Gabčíkovo)
—	DF	SVK	Igor Kotora (loan return from TJ OFC Gabčíkovo)
—	DF	SVK	Lukáš Zelenický (loan return from TJ OFC Gabčíkovo)
—	GK	SVK	Patrik Hipp (loan return from MFK Vrbové)
—	DF	SVK	Pavol Grman (from (Greece) Agrotikos Asteras F.C.)

Out: Note: Flags indicate national team as defined under FIFA eligibility rules; some limited exceptions apply. Players may hold more than one non-FIFA nationality.

No.	Pos.	Nation	Player
—	MF	SVK	Nikolas Špalek (to FC Spartak Trnava)
—	GK	SVK	Matúš Putnocký (loan return to ŠK Slovan Bratislava)
—	DF	SVK	Róbert Pillár (loan return to FK Senica)
—	MF	SVK	Radoslav Augustín (loan return to ŠK Slovan Bratislava)
—	DF	SVK	Jaroslav Kolbas (loan return to 1. FC Tatran Prešov)
—	DF	SVK	Jaroslav Kostelný (Released)
—	DF	SVK	Martin Husár (Released)
—	DF	GHA	John Mensah (Released)
—	MF	GNB	Vladimir Soares Forbs (Released)
—	FW	CZE	Jiří Böhm (Released)
—	MF	BRA	Cléber Nascimento (to FC Spartak Trnava)
—	FW	SVK	Matúš Mikuš (to (Czech Republic) Bohemians 1905)
—	MF	SVK	Denis Čery (Released)
—	MF	SVK	Patrik Kemlage (Released)
—	DF	SVK	Ján Harbuľák (Released)
—	MF	NGA	Franklin Igwe (Released)

==== ŠK SFM Senec ====
In: Note: Flags indicate national team as defined under FIFA eligibility rules; some limited exceptions apply. Players may hold more than one non-FIFA nationality.

No.	Pos.	Nation	Player
—	MF	SVK	Tamás Lénárth (on loan from FK DAC 1904 Dunajská Streda)
—	DF	SVK	Zoltán Ágh (on loan from FK DAC 1904 Dunajská Streda)
—	FW	SRB	Nikola Gavrilović (on loan from FK DAC 1904 Dunajská Streda)
—	MF	SVK	Erik Ľupták (on loan from FTC Fiľakovo)
—	DF	SVK	Igor Paldan (loan return from FC Spartak Trnava)
—	MF	SVK	Filip Tomovič (on loan from FC Spartak Trnava)

Out: Note: Flags indicate national team as defined under FIFA eligibility rules; some limited exceptions apply. Players may hold more than one non-FIFA nationality.

No.	Pos.	Nation	Player

==== FK Slovan Duslo Šaľa ====
In: Note: Flags indicate national team as defined under FIFA eligibility rules; some limited exceptions apply. Players may hold more than one non-FIFA nationality.

No.	Pos.	Nation	Player
—	FW	SRB	Samir Nurković (on loan from MFK Košice)
—	MF	SVK	Andrej Urban (on loan from MFK Dubnica)
—	MF	SRB	Goran Matić (on loan from MFK Tatran Liptovský Mikuláš)
—	FW	SVK	Lukáš Szabo (on loan from FC Slovan Liberec)

Out: Note: Flags indicate national team as defined under FIFA eligibility rules; some limited exceptions apply. Players may hold more than one non-FIFA nationality.

No.	Pos.	Nation	Player
—	DF	SVK	Milan Mujkoš (on loan to FC ViOn Zlaté Moravce)
—	DF	SVK	Marián Kolmokov (loan return to FC Nitra)
—	FW	SVK	Marek Košút (loan return to FC Nitra)
—	FW	FRA	Fabrice Numéric (Released)
—	FW	CGO	Lewis Mukalenga (Released)

=== East ===
==== Partizán Bardejov ====
In: Note: Flags indicate national team as defined under FIFA eligibility rules; some limited exceptions apply. Players may hold more than one non-FIFA nationality.

No.	Pos.	Nation	Player
—	FW	FRA	Loic Guilvic Gagnon (from (France) Villemomble Sports)
—	DF	SVK	Michal Kutlík (on loan from MFK Ružomberok)
—	MF	SVK	René Revák (on loan from MŠK Žilina)

Out: Note: Flags indicate national team as defined under FIFA eligibility rules; some limited exceptions apply. Players may hold more than one non-FIFA nationality.

No.	Pos.	Nation	Player
—	MF	ARM	Gevorg Badalyan (Released)
—	MF	CAN	Andrew Kliment (loan return to MFK Dolný Kubín)
—	FW	SRB	Dragan Andrić (loan return to TJ Rozvoj Pušovce)
—	MF	SVK	Juraj Kuhajdík (on loan to OTJ Palárikovo)

==== MFK Zemplín Michalovce ====
In: Note: Flags indicate national team as defined under FIFA eligibility rules; some limited exceptions apply. Players may hold more than one non-FIFA nationality.

No.	Pos.	Nation	Player
—	FW	SVK	Erik Streňo (on loan from Partizán Bardejov)
—	MF	CZE	Jiří Rabiňák (on loan from (Czech Republic) FC MAS Táborsko)
—	FW	NGA	Hector Tubonemi (on loan from ŽP Šport Podbrezová)
—	MF	ESP	Miguel Cobo Calvo (from (Spain) Granada CF)
—	MF	SVK	Martin Koscelník (on loan from ŠK Futura Humenné)
—	MF	SVK	Erik Micovčák (on loan from KAC Jednota Košice)
—	FW	SVK	Dominik Kunca (early loan return from ŽP Šport Podbrezová)

Out: Note: Flags indicate national team as defined under FIFA eligibility rules; some limited exceptions apply. Players may hold more than one non-FIFA nationality.

No.	Pos.	Nation	Player
—	FW	SVK	Michal Hamuľak (on loan to (Czech Republic) FC Slovan Liberec)
—	MF	SVK	Vladimír Janočko (End of professional career)
—	DF	SVK	Stanislav Smrek (Released)
—	MF	SVK	Lukáš Janič (Released)
—	FW	SVK	Dominik Kunca (on loan to ŽP Šport Podbrezová)
—	MF	SVK	Ján Micka (loan return to (Czech Republic) FK Dukla Prague)
—	FW	SVK	Pavel Čapek (loan return to (Czech Republic) FK Dukla Prague)

==== 1. FC Tatran Prešov ====
In: Note: Flags indicate national team as defined under FIFA eligibility rules; some limited exceptions apply. Players may hold more than one non-FIFA nationality.

No.	Pos.	Nation	Player
—	FW	SVK	Lukáš Eliáš (on loan from TJ Rozvoj Pušovce)
—	DF	SVK	Richard Kačala (loan return from (Poland) Sandecja Nowy Sącz)

Out: Note: Flags indicate national team as defined under FIFA eligibility rules; some limited exceptions apply. Players may hold more than one non-FIFA nationality.

No.	Pos.	Nation	Player
—	DF	SVK	Ján Papaj (Released)
—	DF	SVK	Peter Petráš (Released)
—	MF	SVK	Peter Lipták (on loan to FK Dukla Banská Bystrica)
—	MF	SVK	Martin Pribula (on loan to (Czech Republic) MFK Frýdek-Místek)

==== MFK Tatran Liptovský Mikuláš ====
In: Note: Flags indicate national team as defined under FIFA eligibility rules; some limited exceptions apply. Players may hold more than one non-FIFA nationality.

No.	Pos.	Nation	Player
—	DF	SVK	Ján Papaj (from 1. FC Tatran Prešov)
—	GK	SVK	Miloslav Bréda (on loan from MFK Zemplín Michalovce)
—	FW	SVK	Ján Kostúrik (on loan from ŽP Šport Podbrezová)
—	MF	SVK	Martin Válovčan (on loan from MFK Tatran Liptovský Mikuláš)

Out: Note: Flags indicate national team as defined under FIFA eligibility rules; some limited exceptions apply. Players may hold more than one non-FIFA nationality.

No.	Pos.	Nation	Player
—	MF	SRB	Goran Matić (to FK Slovan Duslo Šaľa)

== See also ==
- 2014–15 Fortuna Liga
- 2014–15 DOXXbet liga
