= 2014–15 FC ViOn Zlaté Moravce season =

FC ViOn
- Full name: FC ViOn Zlaté Moravce
- Founded: 1995
- Ground: Štadión FC ViOn, Zlaté Moravce
- Capacity: 4,000
- Owner: Viliam Ondrejka
- Chairman: Karol Škula
- Manager: Branislav Mráz
- League: Fortuna Liga
- 2013–14: Corgoň Liga, 10th
- Website: http://www.fcvion.sk
Home colours	Away colours	Third colours

FC ViOn Zlaté Moravce is a Slovak football team, based in the town of Zlaté Moravce. The club was founded on 22 January 1995. During the 2014/15 campaign they will be competing in the Slovak Super Liga.

== Competitions ==
At the end of the 2014–15 season, Zlate Moravce would finish in 10th place altogether, getting 32 points from 33 games. The club’s top goal scorer would be Márius Charizopulos and Martin Juhar, both with 4 goals. That season, Zlate Moravce’s most successful result would be in a 2–1 win against FC Spartak Trnava.

=== Slovak Super Liga ===
==== League table ====
Pos	Team	Pld	W	D	L	GF	GA	GD	Pts	Qualification or relegation
8	DAC Dunajská Streda	33	9	12	12	32	44	−12	39	
9	Spartak Myjava	33	11	6	16	38	53	−15	39	
10	ViOn Zlaté Moravce	33	8	8	17	27	54	−27	32	
11	Podbrezová	33	7	8	18	32	54	−22	29	
12	Dukla Banská Bystrica (R)	33	4	10	19	29	57	−28	22	Relegation to 2. Liga

Source: Niké liga (in Slovak)
Rules for classification: 1) Points; 2) Head-to-head points; 3) Head-to-head goal difference; 4) Head-to-head away goals scored; 5) Play-off.
(R) Relegated

==== Matches ====
13 July 2014 Match 1	Spartak Trnava	3–0	FC ViOn	Trnava
17:30	Mikovič 5'; Vlasko 40' (pen.) 58'	Summary	Kováč (red card) 35'; Nikolić (yellow card) 45'	Stadium: Štadión Antona Malatinského; Attendance: 2,733; Referee: (Slovakia) Jan Valasek

19 July 2014 Match 2	FC ViOn	1–1	MFK Ružomberok	Zlaté Moravce
19:30	Carizopulos (yellow card) 25'; Pavlenda (yellow card) 42'; Sabo 43'	Summary	Greššák (yellow card) 30'; Almaský (yellow card) 37'; Turčák 65'; Nagy (yellow card) 90'	Stadium: Štadión FC ViOn; Attendance: 1,048; Referee: (Slovakia) Filip Glova

27 July 2014 Match 3	MFK Košice	1–3	FC ViOn	Košice
17:30	Haskić 37'; Ružinský (yellow card) 38'	Summary	Štrbák (yellow card) 6' (goal) 11'; Carizopulos 27'; Ďurica 39' (pen.); Szöke (yellow card) 87'	Stadium: Lokomotíva Stadium; Attendance: 1,135; Referee: (Slovakia) Marek Mastiš

2 August 2014 Match 4	FC ViOn	0–0	FK Senica	Zlaté Moravce
19:30	Nikolić (yellow card) 52'; Sabo (yellow card) 53'	Summary	Hušek (yellow card) 87'	Stadium: Štadión FC ViOn; Attendance: 1,248; Referee: (Slovakia) Roland Weiss

9 August 2014 Match 5	FC ViOn	1–0	Spartak Myjava	Zlaté Moravce
19:30	Pavlenda 20'	Summary		Stadium: Štadión FC ViOn

15 August 2014 Match 6	FC ViOn	1–1	FK Dukla Banská Bystrica	Zlaté Moravce
18:30	Orávik 32' (pen.); Sabo (yellow card) 74'; Pavelka (yellow card) 84' (yellow-red card)	Summary	Ľupták (yellow card) 31'; Střihavka 37'	Stadium: Štadión FC ViOn; Attendance: 1,200; Referee: (Slovakia) Pavol Suniar

23 August 2014 Match 7	MŠK Žilina	4–0	FC ViOn	Žilina
19:30	Škriniar 24' (pen.); Lupčo 28'; Škvarka 83'; Pečovský 90+2'	Summary	Ďurica (yellow card) 41'; Chren (yellow card) 78'; Valenta (yellow card) 81'	Stadium: Štadión pod Dubňom; Attendance: 1,751; Referee: (Slovakia) Július Straka

30 August 2014 Match 8	Podbrezová	0–0	FC ViOn	Podbrezová
16:00		Summary	Mujkoš (yellow card) 27' (yellow-red card); Orávik (yellow card) 71'	Stadium: Stadium Kolkáreň; Attendance: 2,125; Referee: (Slovakia) Štefan Leško

13 September 2014 Match 9	FC ViOn	1–1	DAC	Zlaté Moravce
17:30	Nikolić (yellow card) 51'; Đuričić 54' (yellow card) 74'; Charizopoulos (yellow card) 82'	Summary	Saláta 5'; Szabó (yellow card) 45'; Brašeň (yellow card) 45'; Jurčo (yellow card) 58'; Turňa (yellow card) 66'	Stadium: Štadión FC ViOn; Attendance: 1,320; Referee: (Slovakia) Lubomir Samotný

16 September 2014 Match 10	Slovan Bratislava	-	FC ViOn	Bratislava
17:30				Stadium: Štadión Pasienky

20 September 2014 Match 11	FC ViOn	0–1	Trenčín	Zlaté Moravce
17:30	Pintér (yellow card) 17'	Summary	Jairo (yellow card) 19'; Rundić (yellow card) 33'; Mišák (yellow card) 35' (goal) 54'; Lawerence (yellow card) 86'	Stadium: Štadión FC ViOn; Attendance: 1,128; Referee: (Slovakia) Boris Marhefka

27 September 2014 Match 12	FC ViOn	2–1	Spartak Trnava	Zlaté Moravce
17:30	Sabo 29'; Nikolić 51'; Kováč (yellow card) 90'	Summary	Sabo 86' (pen.)	Stadium: Štadión FC ViOn; Attendance: 1,768; Referee: (Slovakia) Július Straka

4 October 2014 Match 13	MFK Ružomberok	3–0	FC ViOn	Ružomberok
14:30	Kružliak (yellow card) 57'; Janič 63'; Zreľák 68'; Turčák 83'	Summary	Pavlenda (yellow card) 37'; Pintér (yellow card) 53'; Nikolić (yellow card) 59'	Stadium: Štadión MFK Ružomberok; Attendance: 1,312; Referee: (Slovakia) Ivan Kružliak

18 October 2014 Match 14	FC ViOn	3–0	MFK Košice	Zlaté Moravce
17:30	Pavelka 53'; Charizopulos 57' 86'; Ďurica (yellow card) 83'	Summary	Bašista (red card) 6'; Sekulić (yellow card) 83'; Kavka (yellow card) 85'; Diaby (yellow card) 90'	Stadium: Štadión FC ViOn; Attendance: 958; Referee: (Slovakia) Kamil Horvath

25 October 2014 Match 15	FK Senica	2–0	FC ViOn	Senica
17:30	Kalabiška 26' 54'; Mazáň (yellow card) 87'	Report	Pintér (yellow card) 71'	Stadium: Štadión FK Senica; Attendance: 1,005; Referee: (Slovakia) Boris Marhefka

1 November 2014 Match 16	Spartak Myjava	2–0	FC ViOn	Myjava
17:00	Beňo (yellow card) 21'; Marček (yellow card) 47'; Kuzma 70' 87'	Summary	Sabo (yellow card) 62'	Stadium: Stadium Myjava; Attendance: 983; Referee: (Slovakia) Vladimir Vnuk

8 November 2014 Match 17	FK Dukla Banská Bystrica	2–0	FC ViOn	Banská Bystrica
14:30	Vajda 65' (pen.); Ľupták (yellow card) 73'; Dolný 79' (yellow card) 80'	Summary	Nikolić (yellow card) 55'	Stadium: SNP Stadium; Attendance: 893; Referee: (Slovakia) Michal Smolak

21 November 2014 Match 18	FC ViOn	1–6	MŠK Žilina	Zlaté Moravce
18:30	Pavelka (yellow card) 54' (goal) 69'; Mujkoš (yellow card) 55'	Summary	Paur 18'; Jelić 42' 49' 59'; Mihalík 57' 65'	Stadium: Štadión FC ViOn; Attendance: 1,142; Referee: (Slovakia) Patrik Hrcka

29 November 2014 Match 19	FC ViOn	1–0	Podbrezová	Zlaté Moravce
16:00	Sabo (yellow card) 59'; Pavelka 72'	Summary	Pančík (yellow card) 37'	Stadium: Štadión FC ViOn; Attendance: 860; Referee: (Slovakia) Pavol Chmura

3 December 2014 Match 10	Slovan Bratislava	2–1	FC ViOn	Bratislava
16:30	Milinković 5' 19' (pen.); Peltier (yellow card) 87'	Summary	Pintér (yellow card) 33'; Szöke (yellow card) 50'; Charizopoulos 85'	Stadium: Štadión Pasienky; Attendance: 635; Referee: (Slovakia) Jan Valasek

1 March 2015 Match 20	DAC	1–1	FC ViOn	Dunajská Streda
19:00 CET	Majerník (yellow card) 44'; Sarr (yellow card) 52'; Ljubičić 57'; Šnirc (yellow card) 59'; Michalík (yellow card) 90'	Summary	Pavlenda (red card) 1'; Orávik (yellow card) 54'; Chren (yellow card) 60'; Mazan 67' (yellow card) 72'; Mance (yellow card) 82'; Karaš (yellow card) 85'; Tipurić (yellow card) 90'	Stadium: DAC Stadion; Attendance: 3,483; Referee: (Slovakia) Richard Trutz

7 March 2015 Match 21	FC ViOn	0–2	Slovan Bratislava	Zlaté Moravce
17:30 CET	Pavelka (yellow card) 41'; Mance (yellow card) 79'	Summary	Peltier 44' (yellow card) 63'; Jablonský (yellow card) 69'; Zreľák 87'	Stadium: Štadión FC ViOn; Attendance: 2,126; Referee: (Slovakia) Petár Kralovic

13 March 2015 Match 22	Trenčín	2–0	FC ViOn	Trenčín
19:00 CET	Jairo 34' (yellow card) 34'; Bero 77'	Summary	Ungar (yellow card) 73'	Stadium: Štadión na Sihoti; Attendance: 2,150; Referee: (Slovakia) Lubomir Samotný

21 March 2015 Match 23	Spartak Trnava	3–0	FC ViOn	Trnava
14:30	Sabo 5'; Cléber 48' 67'; Kelava (yellow card) 83'	Summary	Charizopoulos (yellow card) 36'; Pavelka (yellow card) 54'; Pintér (yellow card) 63'; Chren (yellow card) 85'	Stadium: Štadión Antona Malatinského; Attendance: 2,803; Referee: (Slovakia) Marek Mastiš

4 April 2015 Match 24	FC ViOn	0–2	MFK Ružomberok	Zlaté Moravce
14:30	Mikinič (yellow card) 24'; Charizopulos (yellow card) 44'; Pavlenda (yellow card) 69'; Ungar (yellow card) 79'	Summary	Maslo 28' (yellow card) 30' (yellow-red card); Tipurić 35' (o.g.); Lupták (yellow card) 81'	Stadium: Štadión FC ViOn; Attendance: 1,015; Referee: (Slovakia) Filip Glova

11 April 2015 Match 25	MFK Košice	1–2	FC ViOn	Košice
14:30	Sekulić (yellow card) 14'; Haskić 66'; Ostojić (yellow card) 81'; Šinglár (yellow card) 90'	Summary	Karaš 56'; Juhar 87'	Stadium: Lokomotíva Stadium; Attendance: 948; Referee: (Slovakia) Lubomir Samotný

18 April 2015 Match 26	FC ViOn	3–2	FK Senica	Zlaté Moravce
19:00 CET	Juhar 18' (pen.) 26' 89'; Tipurić (yellow card) 37'; Pavlenda (yellow card) 83'	Summary	Chren 9' (o.g.); Marek Pittner (yellow card) 18'; Hušek (yellow card) 27'; Pavlík (yellow card) 45'; Kalabiška (yellow card) 47'; Charizopulos 84' (o.g.)	Stadium: Štadión FC ViOn; Attendance: 1,048; Referee: (Slovakia) Kamil Horvath

25 April 2015 Match 27	Spartak Myjava	2–2	FC ViOn	Myjava
19:00 CET	Duga 52'; Pintér 61' (o.g.); Pekár (yellow card) 79'	Summary	Karaš 34'; Tipurić (yellow card) 71'; Szöke (yellow card) 73'; Mikinič 81'	Stadium: Stadium Myjava; Attendance: 1,286; Referee: (Slovakia) Pavol Šuniar

5 May 2015 Match 28	FC ViOn	0–1	FK Dukla Banská Bystrica	Zlaté Moravce
19:00 CET	Szöke (yellow card) 14'; Tipurić (yellow card) 26'; Pavlenda (yellow card) 62'	Summary	Willwéber (yellow card) 2'; Vajda (yellow card) 45'; Kapor (yellow card) 50'; Rejdovian 52'; Miroslav Gálik (yellow card) 65'; Savić (yellow card) 73'	Stadium: Štadión FC ViOn; Attendance: 810; Referee: (Slovakia) Pavol Chmura

9 May 2015 Match 29	MŠK Žilina	4–1	FC ViOn	Žilina
20:15 CET	Lupčo 4'; Mihalík 20'; Káčer 22' 66'; Bénes (yellow card) 76'	Summary	Mikinič 61'; Kovjenić (yellow card) 64'; Szöke (yellow card) 87'	Stadium: Štadión pod Dubňom; Attendance: 1,037; Referee: (Slovakia) Peter Kralović

16 May 2015 Match 30	Podbrezová	0–2	FC ViOn	Podbrezová
16:30 CET	Vaščák (yellow card) 47'	Summary	Pintér 59'; Charizopulos (yellow card) 63'; Tipurić (yellow card) 65'; Mance 84'	Stadium: Stadium Kolkáreň; Attendance: 1,475; Referee: (Slovakia) Dusan Sedlák

19 May 2015 Match 31	FC ViOn	0–0	DAC	Zlaté Moravce
19:00	Orávik (yellow card) 72'; Mikinič (yellow card) 80'	Summary	Straka (yellow card) 23'; Sarr (yellow card) 72'; Szarka (yellow card) 90'; Michalík (yellow card) 90'	Stadium: Štadión FC ViOn; Attendance: 922; Referee: (Slovakia) Jozef Pavlik

23 May 2015 Match 32	Slovan Bratislava	1–0	FC ViOn	Bratislava
17:15 CET	Mészáros 55' (yellow card) 77'; Kubík (yellow card) 70'; Niňaj (yellow card) 89'	Summary	Mazan (yellow card) 34'; Karaš (yellow card) 63'; Szöke (yellow card) 69'; Mance (yellow card) 84'	Stadium: Štadión Pasienky; Attendance: 485; Referee: (Slovakia) Peter Kralović

30 May 2015 Match 33	FC ViOn	1–3	Trenčín	Zlaté Moravce
17:15 CET	Mikinič (yellow card) 68'; Tipurić (yellow card) 88'; Orávik 90'	Summary	Jairo 12'; Madu 53'; Skovajsa 82' (yellow card) 90'	Stadium: Štadión FC ViOn; Attendance: 840; Referee: (Slovakia) Lubomír Samotný

=== Slovak Cup ===
12 August 2014 Round 2	ŠK Slovan Šimonovany	0–3	FC ViOn
16:30		Summary	M Sukisa 24'; Szöke 32'; Pavelka 83'

9 September 2014 Round 3	KFC Kalná nad Hronom	1–4	FC ViOn	Kalná nad Hronom
16:00	Richard Lackó 51'	Summary	Charizopulos 22' 81'; Toma Mikinič 77'; Orávik 86'	Stadium: Futbalový štadión KFC Kalná nad Hronom; Attendance: 600; Referee: (Slovakia) Gabriel Michlian

14 October 2014 Last 32	MFK Zemplín Michalovce	0–3	FC ViOn	Michalovce
15:30	Miguel Cobo Calvo (yellow card) 54'; Martin Regáli (red card) 66'; Gallo (yellow card) 70'	Summary	Sabo 14'; Orávik 18' (yellow card) 65'; Charizopulos (yellow card) 50'; Nikolić (yellow card) 54'; Stanić (yellow card) 56'; Pintér (yellow card) 71'; Valenta 72'	Stadium: Zemplin Stadium; Attendance: 925; Referee: (Slovakia) Patrik Hrcka

12 November 2014 Last 16	FC ViOn	1–3	AS Trenčín	Zlaté Moravce
17:30	Pavelka (yellow card) 38'; Charizopulos 39'; Mujkoš (yellow card) 40'	Summary	Hajradinović 7'; Jairo 15'; Simon 84'	Stadium: Štadión FC ViOn; Attendance: 386; Referee: (Slovakia) Marek Mastiš
