= List of Slovak football transfers winter 2014–15 =

This is a list of Slovak football transfers in the winter transfer window 2014–15 by club. Only transfers of the Fortuna Liga are included.

== Fortuna Liga ==
=== MŠK Žilina ===
In: Note: Flags indicate national team as defined under FIFA eligibility rules; some limited exceptions apply. Players may hold more than one non-FIFA nationality.

| No. | Pos. | Nation | Player |
|---|---|---|---|
| — | MF | SVK | Nikolas Špalek (from FC Spartak Trnava) |
| — | FW | SVK | Dávid Guba (loan return from AS Trenčín) |
| — | MF | SVK | László Bénes (from (Hungary) Győri ETO FC) |

Out: Note: Flags indicate national team as defined under FIFA eligibility rules; some limited exceptions apply. Players may hold more than one non-FIFA nationality.

| No. | Pos. | Nation | Player |
|---|---|---|---|
| — | GK | SVK | Martin Krnáč (to ŠK Slovan Bratislava) |
| — | FW | SVK | Dávid Guba (to AS Trenčín) |

=== FK AS Trenčín ===
In: Note: Flags indicate national team as defined under FIFA eligibility rules; some limited exceptions apply. Players may hold more than one non-FIFA nationality.

| No. | Pos. | Nation | Player |
|---|---|---|---|
| — | MF | SUR | Ryan Koolwijk (from Free agent) |
| — | FW | NED | Gino van Kessel (from (France) AC Arles-Avignon) |
| — | GK | SVK | Matej Vozár (from Free agent) |
| — | FW | BRA | Wesley (from TBA) |

Out: Note: Flags indicate national team as defined under FIFA eligibility rules; some limited exceptions apply. Players may hold more than one non-FIFA nationality.

| No. | Pos. | Nation | Player |
|---|---|---|---|
| — | MF | BIH | Haris Hajradinović (to (Belgium) K.A.A. Gent) |
| — | FW | NGA | Moses Simon (to (Belgium) K.A.A. Gent) |
| — | MF | SVK | Patrik Mišák (to (Czech Republic) FC Baník Ostrava) |

=== FK Senica ===
In: Note: Flags indicate national team as defined under FIFA eligibility rules; some limited exceptions apply. Players may hold more than one non-FIFA nationality.

| No. | Pos. | Nation | Player |
|---|---|---|---|
| 8 | DF | SVK | Pavel Čermák (loan return from (Czech Republic) FC Hradec Králové) |
| 10 | MF | SVK | Jozef Dolný (from 1. FC Tatran Prešov) |

Out: Note: Flags indicate national team as defined under FIFA eligibility rules; some limited exceptions apply. Players may hold more than one non-FIFA nationality.

| No. | Pos. | Nation | Player |
|---|---|---|---|
| 8 | DF | SVK | Zdenko Filípek (on loan to TJ OFC Gabčíkovo) |
| 22 | DF | BRA | Vitor Gava (Released) |
| 21 | DF | SVK | Róbert Mazáň (to (Poland) Podbeskidzie Bielsko-Biała) |
| 2 | DF | SVK | Juraj Chvátal (on loan to (Czech Republic) AC Sparta Prague) |
| 10 | FW | COD | Mulumba Mukendi (End of contract) |
| 33 | MF | SVK | Juraj Piroska (to (Kazakhstan) FC Kaisar Kyzylorda) |

=== Spartak Myjava ===
In: Note: Flags indicate national team as defined under FIFA eligibility rules; some limited exceptions apply. Players may hold more than one non-FIFA nationality.

| No. | Pos. | Nation | Player |
|---|---|---|---|
| — | MF | SVK | Ľuboš Kolár (on loan from (Czech Republic) FC Slovan Liberec) |
| — | FW | SVK | Michal Peňaška (on loan from ŠK Slovan Bratislava) |
| — | GK | SVK | Matúš Hruška (on loan from FK Púchov) |
| — | FW | SVK | Martin Janco (on loan from FK Raven Považská Bystrica) |

Out: Note: Flags indicate national team as defined under FIFA eligibility rules; some limited exceptions apply. Players may hold more than one non-FIFA nationality.

| No. | Pos. | Nation | Player |
|---|---|---|---|
| — | GK | SVK | Tomáš Belic (Released) |
| — | MF | SVK | Tomáš Bruško (Released) |
| — | FW | SVK | Roman Sirota (Released) |
| — | FW | SVK | Roland Šmahajčík (on loan to FC Senec) |
| — | FW | SVK | Filip Oršula (to ŠK Slovan Bratislava) |
| — | FW | SVK | Peter Sládek (on loan to FC Spartak Trnava) |
| — | FW | SVK | Arnold Šimonek (Released) |

=== ŠK Slovan Bratislava ===
In: Note: Flags indicate national team as defined under FIFA eligibility rules; some limited exceptions apply. Players may hold more than one non-FIFA nationality.

| No. | Pos. | Nation | Player |
|---|---|---|---|
| — | DF | SVK | Martin Dobrotka (from (Czech Republic) SK Slavia Prague) |
| — | DF | SVK | Kornel Saláta (loan return from FC DAC 1904 Dunajská Streda) |
| — | FW | SVK | Michal Peňaška (loan return from FK Dukla Banská Bystrica) |
| — | FW | SVK | Filip Oršula (from Spartak Myjava) |
| — | MF | SRB | Slobodan Simović (from (Belarus) FC Dinamo Minsk) |
| — | GK | SVK | Martin Krnáč (from MŠK Žilina) |
| — | FW | SVK | Adam Zreľák (from MFK Ružomberok) |
| — | DF | SVK | Timotej Záhumenský (loan return from FO ŽP Šport Podbrezová) |

Out: Note: Flags indicate national team as defined under FIFA eligibility rules; some limited exceptions apply. Players may hold more than one non-FIFA nationality.

| No. | Pos. | Nation | Player |
|---|---|---|---|
| — | FW | CZE | Pavel Fořt (to (Czech Republic) 1. FK Příbram) |
| — | DF | SRB | Miloš Josimov (Released and joined (Serbia) FK Donji Srem) |
| — | DF | CIV | Mamadou Bagayoko (Released and joined (Belgium) Sint-Truiden) |
| — | FW | SVK | Juraj Halenár (to (Hungary) Nyíregyháza) |
| — | MF | SVK | Igor Žofčák (to (Hungary) Nyíregyháza) |
| — | DF | SVK | Kristián Kolčák (to (Poland) Podbeskidzie Bielsko-Biała) |
| — | DF | SVK | Dávid Hudák (on loan to (Hungary) Újpest FC) |
| — | DF | SVK | Martin Vrablec (on loan to FC ViOn Zlaté Moravce) |
| — | DF | SVK | Timotej Záhumenský (on loan to FO ŽP Šport Podbrezová) |
| — | GK | SVK | Martin Poláček (to FK DAC 1904 Dunajská Streda) |
| — | MF | SVK | Erik Grendel (to (Poland) Górnik Zabrze) |
| — | FW | SVK | Michal Peňaška (on loan to Spartak Myjava) |
| — | MF | SVK | Tomáš Bagi (on loan to (Armenia) FC Banants) |
| — | FW | SVK | Róbert Matejka (on loan to FK DAC 1904 Dunajská Streda) |
| — | DF | CZE | Tomáš Jablonský (Released) |

=== FC Spartak Trnava ===
In: Note: Flags indicate national team as defined under FIFA eligibility rules; some limited exceptions apply. Players may hold more than one non-FIFA nationality.

| No. | Pos. | Nation | Player |
|---|---|---|---|
| — | DF | SRB | Miloš Nikolić (from FC ViOn Zlaté Moravce) |
| — | FW | SVK | Peter Sládek (on loan from Spartak Myjava) |
| — | GK | SVK | Adam Jakubech (from 1. FC Tatran Prešov) |
| — | GK | CRO | Ivan Kelava (on loan from (Spain) Granada CF) |
| — | MF | SVK | Ján Chovanec (loan return from (Poland) Ruch Chorzów) |
| — | FW | SVK | Jakub Vojtuš (from Free agent) |
| — | MF | SVK | Marek Hlinka (on loan from (Czech Republic) FK Dukla Prague) |

Out: Note: Flags indicate national team as defined under FIFA eligibility rules; some limited exceptions apply. Players may hold more than one non-FIFA nationality.

| No. | Pos. | Nation | Player |
|---|---|---|---|
| — | GK | SVK | Dobrivoj Rusov (to (Poland) Piast Gliwice) |
| — | MF | SVK | Nikolas Špalek (to MŠK Žilina) |
| — | FW | SVK | Erik Jendrišek (to (Poland) KS Cracovia) |
| — | DF | SVK | Matej Siva (Released) |
| — | FW | MLT | Jean Paul Farrugia (loan return (Malta) Hibernians) |
| — | FW | SVK | Ivan Schranz (on loan to (Czech Republic) AC Sparta Praha) |

=== MFK Košice ===
In: Note: Flags indicate national team as defined under FIFA eligibility rules; some limited exceptions apply. Players may hold more than one non-FIFA nationality.

| No. | Pos. | Nation | Player |

Out: Note: Flags indicate national team as defined under FIFA eligibility rules; some limited exceptions apply. Players may hold more than one non-FIFA nationality.

| No. | Pos. | Nation | Player |
|---|---|---|---|
| — | FW | SVK | Dávid Škutka (loan return to (Czech Republic) SK Slavia Prague) |
| — | DF | SRB | Ivan Ostojić (End of contract) |
| — | DF | SRB | Boris Sekulić (End of contract) |
| — | DF | SVK | Peter Kavka (End of contract) |
| — | MF | SVK | Ľubomír Korijkov (Released) |
| — | DF | SVK | Peter Bašista (Released) |
| — | FW | SVK | Ján Novák (Released) |

=== FO ŽP Šport Podbrezová ===
In: Note: Flags indicate national team as defined under FIFA eligibility rules; some limited exceptions apply. Players may hold more than one non-FIFA nationality.

| No. | Pos. | Nation | Player |
|---|---|---|---|
| — | DF | SVK | Lukáš Migaľa (from MŠK Rimavská Sobota) |
| — | MF | SVK | Róbert Richnák (on loan from FC Spartak Trnava) |
| — | DF | SVK | Timotej Záhumenský (on loan from ŠK Slovan Bratislava) |
| — | FW | SVK | Dávid Škutka (on loan from (Czech Republic) SK Slavia Prague) |
| — | FW | CZE | Martin Šlapák (from (Czech Republic) 1. FK Příbram) |
| — | GK | SVK | Pavol Penksa (from FC DAC 1904 Dunajská Streda) |

Out: Note: Flags indicate national team as defined under FIFA eligibility rules; some limited exceptions apply. Players may hold more than one non-FIFA nationality.

| No. | Pos. | Nation | Player |
|---|---|---|---|
| — | GK | SVK | Andrej Maťašovský (loan return to MFK Dubnica) |
| — | MF | SVK | Kamil Karaš (Released) |
| — | FW | SVK | Štefan Gerec (loan return to MFK Ružomberok) |
| — | DF | SVK | Gabriel Snitka (on loan to FK Dukla Banská Bystrica) |
| — | MF | SVK | Lukáš Kožička (on loan to MFK Lokomotíva Zvolen) |
| — | DF | SVK | Timotej Záhumenský (loan return to ŠK Slovan Bratislava) |

=== FC DAC 1904 Dunajská Streda ===
In: Note: Flags indicate national team as defined under FIFA eligibility rules; some limited exceptions apply. Players may hold more than one non-FIFA nationality.

| No. | Pos. | Nation | Player |
|---|---|---|---|
| — | DF | SVK | Ľubomír Michalík (from (Kazakhstan) FC Kairat) |
| — | MF | CRO | Marin Ljubičić (from Free agent) |
| — | MF | BIH | Ivan Sesar (from Free agent) |
| — | GK | SVK | Martin Poláček (from SK Slovan Bratislava) |
| — | MF | SVK | Branislav Ľupták (from FK Dukla Banská Bystrica) |
| — | MF | SEN | Pape Macou Sarr (from (France) Angers SCO) |
| — | FW | SVK | Róbert Matejka (on loan from SK Slovan Bratislava) |

Out: Note: Flags indicate national team as defined under FIFA eligibility rules; some limited exceptions apply. Players may hold more than one non-FIFA nationality.

| No. | Pos. | Nation | Player |
|---|---|---|---|
| — | DF | SVK | Kornel Saláta (loan return to ŠK Slovan Bratislava) |
| — | DF | SVK | Peter Struhár (Released) |
| — | MF | SVK | Goran Antunovič (loan return to KFC Komarno) |
| — | MF | SVK | Miroslav Stanić (Released) |
| — | MF | CMR | Jean Paul Ntsogo Boya (Released) |
| — | GK | SVK | Pavol Penksa (to FO ŽP Šport Podbrezová) |

=== FC ViOn Zlaté Moravce ===
In: Note: Flags indicate national team as defined under FIFA eligibility rules; some limited exceptions apply. Players may hold more than one non-FIFA nationality.

| No. | Pos. | Nation | Player |
|---|---|---|---|
| — | FW | SVK | Peter Mazan (from FK AS Trenčín) |
| — | DF | AUT | Toni Tipurić (from (Estonia) FC Levadia Tallinn) |
| — | MF | SVK | Kamil Karaš (from FO ŽP Šport Podbrezová) |
| — | GK | SRB | Milorad Nikolić (from MFK Ružomberok) |
| — | FW | CRO | Armando Mance (from MFK Ružomberok) |
| — | MF | SVK | Martin Juhar (from Free agent) |
| — | DF | SVK | Martin Vrablec (on loan from SK Slovan Bratislava) |

Out: Note: Flags indicate national team as defined under FIFA eligibility rules; some limited exceptions apply. Players may hold more than one non-FIFA nationality.

| No. | Pos. | Nation | Player |
|---|---|---|---|
| — | DF | SRB | Miloš Nikolić (to FC Spartak Trnava) |
| — | DF | SVK | Milan Mujkoš (loan return to FK Slovan Duslo Šaľa) |
| — | MF | SVK | Patrik Gregora (Released) |
| — | DF | SVK | Marián Štrbák (Released) |
| — | DF | SVK | Juraj Pilát (Released) |
| — | MF | SVK | Peter Ďurica (Released) |
| — | FW | COD | Elvis Mashike Sukisa (Released) |

=== MFK Ružomberok ===
In: Note: Flags indicate national team as defined under FIFA eligibility rules; some limited exceptions apply. Players may hold more than one non-FIFA nationality.

| No. | Pos. | Nation | Player |
|---|---|---|---|
| — | FW | SVK | Štefan Gerec (loan return from FO ŽP Šport Podbrezová) |
| — | GK | SVK | Štefan Senecký (from ŠKF Sereď) |
| — | DF | SVK | Martin Boszorád (from FC Nitra) |
| — | FW | SVK | Pavol Masaryk (from Free agent) |
| — | MF | SVK | Marek Sapara (on loan from (Turkey) Osmanlıspor) |
| — | DF | ARM | Gagik Daghbashyan (from (Armenia) FC Banants) |
| — | DF | SVK | Ján Maslo (from (Kazakhstan) FC Shakhter Karagandy) |
| — | DF | SVK | Antonín Rosa (on loan from (Czech Republic) FK Mladá Boleslav) |
| — | FW | SVK | Patrik Laco (on loan from MFK Tatran Liptovský Mikuláš) |

Out: Note: Flags indicate national team as defined under FIFA eligibility rules; some limited exceptions apply. Players may hold more than one non-FIFA nationality.

| No. | Pos. | Nation | Player |
|---|---|---|---|
| — | DF | SVK | Martin Nosek (Released and joined (Czech Republic) FC Hradec Králové) |
| — | DF | SVK | Martin Mečiar (Released) |
| — | FW | CRO | Armando Mance (Released) |
| — | MF | SVK | Róbert Vaniš (Released) |
| — | GK | SVK | Libor Koníček (Released) |
| — | FW | SVK | Adam Zreľák (to ŠK Slovan Bratislava) |
| — | GK | SVK | Matúš Putnocký (to (Poland) Ruch Chorzów) |
| — | MF | SVK | Erik Liener (on loan to MFK Lokomotíva Zvolen) |
| — | MF | SVK | Miroslav Almaský (on loan to ŠKM Liptovský Hrádok) |
| — | DF | SVK | Michal Habánek (Released) |

=== FK Dukla Banská Bystrica ===
In: Note: Flags indicate national team as defined under FIFA eligibility rules; some limited exceptions apply. Players may hold more than one non-FIFA nationality.

| No. | Pos. | Nation | Player |
|---|---|---|---|
| — | DF | SVK | Marián Had (from Free agent) |
| — | DF | SUI | Stefan Marinković (from (Finland) FC Inter Turku) |
| — | DF | CAN | Milovan Kapor (on loan from PFK Piešťany) |
| — | FW | BIH | Armel Berbić (from (Croatia) NK Stupnik) |
| — | MF | CRO | Belmin Mazić (from (Croatia) NK Stupnik) |
| — | MF | SVK | Tomáš Zázrivec (from (England) Aston Villa F.C.) |
| — | DF | SVK | Gabriel Snitka (on loan from FO ŽP Šport Podbrezová) |
| — | DF | SVK | Miroslav Gálik (loan return from MŠK Rimavská Sobota) |
| — | MF | SVK | Tomáš Fajčík (loan return from MFK Lokomotíva Zvolen) |

Out: Note: Flags indicate national team as defined under FIFA eligibility rules; some limited exceptions apply. Players may hold more than one non-FIFA nationality.

| No. | Pos. | Nation | Player |
|---|---|---|---|
| — | MF | SVK | Branislav Ľupták (to FC DAC 1904 Dunajská Streda) |
| — | FW | SVK | Michal Peňaška (loan return to ŠK Slovan Bratislava) |
| — | DF | SVK | Jozef Adámik (loan return to KFC Komárno) |
| — | FW | SVK | Peter Mazan (loan return to FK AS Trenčín) |
| — | FW | SVK | Jozef Dolný (loan return to 1. FC Tatran Prešov) |
| — | MF | CZE | Petr Wojnar (Released) |
| — | MF | CZE | Nicolas Šumský (Released) |
| — | FW | CZE | David Střihavka (Released) |
| — | GK | SVK | Viktor Budinský (Released) |
| — | FW | SVK | Mouhamadou Seye (to (Hungary) Lombard-Pápa TFC) |

== See also ==
- 2014–15 Fortuna Liga
