= List of Slovak football transfers summer 2016 =

Notable Slovak football transfers in the summer transfer window 2016 by club. Only transfers of the Fortuna Liga and DOXXbet liga are included.

== Fortuna Liga ==
=== FK AS Trenčín ===
In: Note: Flags indicate national team as defined under FIFA eligibility rules; some limited exceptions apply. Players may hold more than one non-FIFA nationality.

No.	Pos.	Nation	Player
—	FW	CUW	Rangelo Janga (from (Netherlands) FC Dordrecht)
—	FW	NED	Jamarro Diks (from (Netherlands) WSV Apeldoorn)
—	DF	BRA	Rafael Martins Vieira da Silva (from (Brazil) Macaé Esporte Futebol Clube)
—	DF	SVK	Dominik Rolinec (from FK AS Trenčín youth)
—	FW	SVK	Erik Prekop (from FK AS Trenčín youth)
—	FW	SVK	Erik Mikeš (from FK AS Trenčín youth)
—	MF	SVK	Dávid Richtárech (loan return from FK Inter Bratislava)
—	DF	NED	Jeffrey Ket (from (Netherlands) FC Oss)
—	MF	ARG	Aldo Baéz (from (Czech Republic) SK Slavia Prague)
—	MF	BRA	Pedro Colina (from (Brazil) Itaboraí Profute Futebol Clube)
—	FW	NED	Chisom Leonard Johnson (from (Italy) A.S.D. Roccella)
—	MF	SVK	Jakub Paur (from MŠK Žilina)
—	MF	NGA	Reuben Gabriel (from Free agent)
—	FW	NGA	Uche Nwofor (from Free agent)

Out: Note: Flags indicate national team as defined under FIFA eligibility rules; some limited exceptions apply. Players may hold more than one non-FIFA nationality.

No.	Pos.	Nation	Player
—	MF	NED	Mitchell Schet (Released and joined ŠK Slovan Bratislava)
—	MF	NED	Ryan Koolwijk (End of contract - joined (Netherlands) Excelsior)
—	MF	SVK	Dávid Guba (to (Poland) LKS Nieciecza)
—	MF	AUT	Stefan Maierhofer (End of contract)
—	DF	SRB	Milan Rundić (to ŠK Slovan Bratislava)
—	FW	CUW	Gino van Kessel (to (Czech Republic) SK Slavia Prague)
—	MF	SVK	Matúš Bero (to (Turkey) Trabzonspor)
—	FW	SVK	Tomáš Malec (to (Norway) Lillestrøm SK)
—	MF	SVK	Jakub Holúbek (to MŠK Žilina)
—	DF	NGA	Kingsley Madu (to (Belgium) Zulte Waregem)
—	MF	NGA	Rabiu Ibrahim (to (Belgium) K.A.A. Gent)

=== ŠK Slovan Bratislava ===
In: Note: Flags indicate national team as defined under FIFA eligibility rules; some limited exceptions apply. Players may hold more than one non-FIFA nationality.

No.	Pos.	Nation	Player
—	GK	SVK	Martin Krnáč (loan return from MFK Skalica)
—	MF	NED	Lesly de Sa (from Free Agent)
—	DF	NED	Lorenzo Burnet (from Free Agent)
—	MF	NED	Mitchell Schet (from Free Agent)
—	DF	NED	Ruben Ligeon (from (Netherlands) AFC Ajax)
—	DF	SRB	Milan Rundić (from AS Trenčín)
—	MF	SVK	Richard Lásik (loan return from (Czech Republic) FC Baník Ostrava)
—	MF	GUI	Seydouba Soumah (loan return from (Kuwait) Qadsia SC)
—	MF	BRA	Cléber (from FC Spartak Trnava)
—	FW	SVK	Patrik Pinte (loan return from ŠK Slovan Bratislava youth)
—	DF	SVK	Samuel Antálek (loan return from ŠK Slovan Bratislava youth)
—	DF	ARG	Vernon (on loan from MFK Zemplín Michalovce)
—	FW	SRB	Aleksandar Čavrić (from (Belgium) K.R.C. Genk)

Out: Note: Flags indicate national team as defined under FIFA eligibility rules; some limited exceptions apply. Players may hold more than one non-FIFA nationality.

No.	Pos.	Nation	Player
—	MF	SRB	Marko Milinković (to (Turkey) Gençlerbirliği S.K.)
—	DF	CZE	Jakub Podaný (Released and joined (Czech Republic) Dukla Prague)
—	MF	SRB	Slobodan Simović (Released and joined (Israel) Hapoel Kfar Saba)
—	GK	CZE	Karel Hrubeš (loan return to (Czech Republic) SK Slavia Prague)
—	DF	FRA	Claude Dielna (loan return to (England) Sheffield Wednesday F.C.)
—	DF	FRA	Moise Adilehou (loan return to (France) AS Vitré)
—	MF	ARG	Mauro González (loan return to (Argentina) Boca Juniors)
—	MF	BIH	Nermin Crnkić (Released and joined (Bosnia and Herzegovina) FK Sarajevo)
—	MF	SVK	Matej Jakúbek (Released and joined MFK Nová Dubnica)
—	MF	SVK	Patrik Sabo (Released and joined (Austria) FC Andau)
—	MF	SVK	Samuel Štefánik (to (Poland) LKS Nieciecza)
—	MF	SVK	Adrián Čermák (to (Czech Republic) České Budějovice)
—	DF	SVK	Dávid Hudák (to (Hungary) Mezőkövesd-Zsóry SE)
—	FW	SVK	Róbert Vittek (End of contract - joined (Hungary) Debreceni VSC)
—	MF	SVK	Richard Lásik (to (Italy) Avellino)
—	MF	SVK	Adrián Kopičár (to FK Senica)
—	FW	SVK	Adam Zreľák (to (Czech Republic) FK Jablonec)

=== Spartak Myjava ===
In: Note: Flags indicate national team as defined under FIFA eligibility rules; some limited exceptions apply. Players may hold more than one non-FIFA nationality.

No.	Pos.	Nation	Player
—	DF	SVK	Richard Čiernik (loan return from ŠK LR Crystal Lednické Rovne)
—	DF	SVK	Peter Egri (loan return from AFC Nové Mesto nad Váhom)
—	DF	BIH	Adi Mehremić (from FK Senica)
—	DF	CZE	Petr Pavlík (from FK Senica)
—	MF	SVK	Patrik Abrahám (from ŠKF Sereď)
—	MF	SVK	Vladimír Kukoľ (from (Czech Republic) FC Vysočina Jihlava)
—	MF	SVK	Erik Vávra (loan return from AFC Nové Mesto nad Váhom)
—	FW	SVK	Dominik Ferenčič (loan return from FC Rohožník)
—	MF	SVK	Šimon Šmehýl (from FK Senica)
—	FW	SVK	Roman Sabler (on loan from FC DAC 1904 Dunajská Streda)
—	MF	SVK	Tomáš Brigant (on loan from (Czech Republic) FC Zbrojovka Brno)
—	MF	SVK	Štefan Holiš (from FK Slovan Nemšová)

Out: Note: Flags indicate national team as defined under FIFA eligibility rules; some limited exceptions apply. Players may hold more than one non-FIFA nationality.

No.	Pos.	Nation	Player
—	DF	SVK	Ján Chovanec (Released and joined FC Nitra)
—	FW	SVK	Dávid Škutka (Released and joined MFK Zemplín Michalovce)
—	MF	CZE	Erik Daniel (to MFK Ružomberok)

=== FC Spartak Trnava ===
In: Note: Flags indicate national team as defined under FIFA eligibility rules; some limited exceptions apply. Players may hold more than one non-FIFA nationality.

No.	Pos.	Nation	Player
—	DF	SVK	Ivan Hladík (from FK Senica)
—	FW	SVK	Matúš Paukner (from (Hungary) Békéscsaba 1912 Előre)
—	DF	SVK	Peter Čögley (from (Czech Republic) Bohemians 1905)
—	MF	BRA	Éder (from (Brazil) Esporte Clube São Bento)
—	MF	FRA	Loïc Gagnon (from Partizán Bardejov)
—	MF	SVK	Anton Sloboda (from (Poland) Podbeskidzie Bielsko-Biała)
—	FW	ITA	Edoardo Ceria (on loan from (Italy) Atalanta)

Out: Note: Flags indicate national team as defined under FIFA eligibility rules; some limited exceptions apply. Players may hold more than one non-FIFA nationality.

No.	Pos.	Nation	Player
—	GK	SVK	Ľuboš Kamenár (End of contract - joined (Poland) Śląsk Wrocław)
—	DF	SRB	Miloš Nikolić (End of contract - joined (Czech Republic) 1. FK Příbram)
—	MF	BRA	Cléber (End of contract - joined ŠK Slovan Bratislava)
—	FW	SVK	Tomáš Majtán (End of contract - joined (Czech Republic) 1. FK Příbram)
—	DF	ARG	Aldo Baéz (loan return to (Czech Republic) SK Slavia Prague)
—	MF	SVK	Róbert Jež (End of career)
—	FW	SVK	David Depetris (End of contract - joined (Argentina) Huracán)
—	MF	BRA	Éder (Released)

=== MŠK Žilina ===
In: Note: Flags indicate national team as defined under FIFA eligibility rules; some limited exceptions apply. Players may hold more than one non-FIFA nationality.

No.	Pos.	Nation	Player
—	MF	GER	Christopher Mandiangu (from Free Agent)
—	MF	COL	Joan Jaramillo (from FK Iskra Borčice)
—	FW	NGA	Yusuf Otubanjo (from (Austria) FC Blau-Weiß Linz)
—	DF	CZE	Filip Kaša (from (Czech Republic) Baník Ostrava)
—	MF	SVK	Michal Klec (loan return from FK Senica)
—	GK	SVK	Martin Leško (from MŠK Žilina II)
—	FW	GAM	Momodou Ceesay (from (Israel) Maccabi Netanya F.C.)
—	MF	SVK	Jakub Holúbek (from FK AS Trenčín)
—	MF	MDA	Eugeniu Cociuc (from (Moldova) FC Dacia Chișinău)

Out: Note: Flags indicate national team as defined under FIFA eligibility rules; some limited exceptions apply. Players may hold more than one non-FIFA nationality.

No.	Pos.	Nation	Player
—	MF	SVK	László Bénes (to (Germany) Borussia Mönchengladbach)
—	GK	SVK	Patrik Le Giang (End of contract)
—	DF	CZE	Ondřej Švejdík (loan return to (Czech Republic) AC Sparta Prague)
—	DF	SVK	Tomáš Hučko (on loan to (Czech Republic) FC Baník Ostrava)
—	MF	SVK	Jakub Paur (to FK AS Trenčín)
—	FW	GAM	Momodou Ceesay (Released)

=== MFK Ružomberok ===
In: Note: Flags indicate national team as defined under FIFA eligibility rules; some limited exceptions apply. Players may hold more than one non-FIFA nationality.

No.	Pos.	Nation	Player
—	DF	SVK	Šimon Kupec (from FC ViOn Zlaté Moravce)
—	MF	SVK	Martin Chrien (on loan from (Czech Republic) FC Viktoria Plzeň)
—	MF	CZE	Jakub Mareš (from (Czech Republic) FK Dukla Prague)
—	MF	SVK	Jozef Menich (from MŠK Fomat Martin)
—	GK	SVK	Matúš Macík (from MFK Tatran Liptovský Mikuláš)
—	MF	CZE	Erik Daniel (from Spartak Myjava)
—	MF	SVK	Kristián Kolčák (from (Poland) Podbeskidzie Bielsko-Biała)

Out: Note: Flags indicate national team as defined under FIFA eligibility rules; some limited exceptions apply. Players may hold more than one non-FIFA nationality.

No.	Pos.	Nation	Player
—	FW	SVK	Martin Jakubko (End of career)
—	MF	SVK	Štefan Zošák (End of contract - joined (Kazakhstan) FC Shakhter Karagandy)
—	GK	MKD	Darko Tofiloski (End of contract - joined Dunajská Streda)
—	MF	CZE	Antonín Rosa (loan return to (Czech Republic) FK Mladá Boleslav)
—	DF	SVK	Lukáš Lupták (End of contract - joined (Czech Republic) FC Baník Ostrava)
—	DF	ARM	Gagik Daghbashyan (End of contract - joined (Armenia) Alashkert FC)
—	DF	SVK	Martin Boszorád (End of contract - joined FC ViOn Zlaté Moravce)
—	MF	SVK	Ivan Kotora (Released and joined MFK Zemplín Michalovce)

=== FC DAC 1904 Dunajská Streda ===
In: Note: Flags indicate national team as defined under FIFA eligibility rules; some limited exceptions apply. Players may hold more than one non-FIFA nationality.

No.	Pos.	Nation	Player
—	DF	HUN	Gergő Kocsis (from (Hungary) Puskás Akadémia FC)
—	FW	LVA	Valērijs Šabala (on loan from (Belgium) Club Brugge KV)
—	FW	HUN	Kristopher Vida (from (Netherlands) De Graafschap)
—	GK	MKD	Darko Tofiloski (from MFK Ružomberok)
—	FW	SVK	Ladislav Almási (from FK Senica)

Out: Note: Flags indicate national team as defined under FIFA eligibility rules; some limited exceptions apply. Players may hold more than one non-FIFA nationality.

No.	Pos.	Nation	Player
—	MF	PAN	Alfredo Stephens (loan return to (Panama) Chorrillo F.C.)
—	GK	SVK	Tomáš Tujvel (loan return to (Hungary) Videoton FC)
—	FW	SVK	Roman Sabler (on loan to FC DAC 1904 Dunajská Streda)

=== FO ŽP Šport Podbrezová ===
In: Note: Flags indicate national team as defined under FIFA eligibility rules; some limited exceptions apply. Players may hold more than one non-FIFA nationality.

No.	Pos.	Nation	Player
—	MF	SVK	Michal Breznaník (from Free Agent)
—	FW	NED	Endy Opoku Bernadina (from FK Dukla Banská Bystrica)
—	MF	SVK	Peter Szczepaniak (from FO ŽP Šport Podbrezová juniori)
—	MF	SVK	Kamil Kuzma (from FC VSS Košice)

Out: Note: Flags indicate national team as defined under FIFA eligibility rules; some limited exceptions apply. Players may hold more than one non-FIFA nationality.

No.	Pos.	Nation	Player
—	DF	SRB	Nikola Andrić (to (Serbia) FK Mladost Lučani)
—	FW	SVK	Roman Sabler (loan return to FC DAC 1904 Dunajská Streda)
—	DF	CZE	Václav Ježdík (Released)
—	DF	CAN	Milovan Kapor (to FC ViOn Zlaté Moravce)
—	MF	SVK	Blažej Vaščák (Released and joined FC Lokomotíva Košice)

=== FC ViOn Zlaté Moravce ===
In: Note: Flags indicate national team as defined under FIFA eligibility rules; some limited exceptions apply. Players may hold more than one non-FIFA nationality.

No.	Pos.	Nation	Player
—	DF	CAN	Milovan Kapor (from FO ŽP Šport Podbrezová)
—	DF	SVK	Jakub Kastelovič (from FK Slovan Duslo Šaľa)
—	MF	SVK	Miroslav Pastva (from MFK Tatran Liptovský Mikuláš)
—	MF	MKD	Tihomir Kostadinov (from FK Dukla Banská Bystrica)
—	DF	SVK	Miroslav Sedlák (from FK Slovan Duslo Šaľa)
—	FW	GUI	Pepe Guilavogui (from Spartak Trnava juniori)
—	DF	SVK	Martin Boszorád (from MFK Ružomberok)
—	DF	SVK	Denis Švec (from MFK Nová Dubnica)
—	DF	SVK	Michal Ranko (on loan from FK AS Trenčín)
—	FW	SVK	Martin Válovčan (on loan from MFK Žarnovica)
—	MF	SVK	Michal Obročník (on loan from (Czech Republic) FC Slovan Liberec)
—	FW	CTA	Jésus Konnsimbal (from FC VSS Košice)

Out: Note: Flags indicate national team as defined under FIFA eligibility rules; some limited exceptions apply. Players may hold more than one non-FIFA nationality.

No.	Pos.	Nation	Player
—	MF	CRO	Dejan Školnik (Released and joined (Italy) Mantova F.C.)
—	DF	SVK	Šimon Kupec (to MFK Ružomberok)
—	MF	BIH	Marko Perišić (Released and joined (Austria) Kapfenberger SV)
—	MF	CIV	Mouroukou Farras Bamba (Released)
—	MF	CRO	Josip Krznarić (Released)
—	DF	AUT	Toni Tipurić (Released)
—	DF	BIH	Danijel Majkić (Released)
—	DF	CAN	Stefan Cebara (Released)
—	DF	BRA	Marques de Souza (Released)
—	FW	SVK	Fabián Slančík (loan return to (Czech Republic) FC Zbrojovka Brno)
—	FW	SVK	Marek Kuzma (to (Bulgaria) PFC Cherno More Varna)

=== FK Senica ===
In: Note: Flags indicate national team as defined under FIFA eligibility rules; some limited exceptions apply. Players may hold more than one non-FIFA nationality.

No.	Pos.	Nation	Player
—	DF	CZE	Pavel Košťál (from (Czech Republic) FC Zbrojovka Brno)
—	DF	UKR	Ihor Honchar (from (Ukraine) FC Shakhtar Donetsk)
—	FW	CZE	Daniel Turyna (on loan from (Czech Republic) AC Sparta Prague)
—	DF	ESP	Alberto Delgado Quintana (from Free Agent)
—	DF	GHA	Paul Quaye (from (Spain) Elche CF Ilicitano)
—	MF	CZE	Miloš Kratochvíl (on loan from (Czech Republic) FC Viktoria Plzeň)
—	FW	ESP	Guille (from (Spain) Celta de Vigo B)
—	MF	ESP	Pedro Astray (from (Spain) Getafe CF B)
—	MF	ESP	José Pirulo (from (Spain) CE Sabadell FC)
—	DF	CZE	Dávid Březina (on loan from AC Sparta Prague)
—	MF	SVK	Filip Blažek (from FK Senica youth)
—	FW	CMR	Alain Richard Ebwelle (from (Spain) CD Castellón)
—	MF	SVK	Adrián Kopičár (from ŠK Slovan Bratislava)

Out: Note: Flags indicate national team as defined under FIFA eligibility rules; some limited exceptions apply. Players may hold more than one non-FIFA nationality.

No.	Pos.	Nation	Player
—	DF	CZE	Petr Pavlík (to Spartak Myjava)
—	DF	SVK	Ivan Hladík (to FC Spartak Trnava)
—	MF	SVK	Tomáš Komara (Released)
—	DF	SVK	Marek Pittner (Released)
—	MF	SVK	Denis Ventura (Released)
—	DF	BIH	Adi Mehremić (to Spartak Myjava)
—	FW	SVK	Jakub Hromada (loan return to (Italy) U.C. Sampdoria)
—	MF	SVK	Dávid Leško (to 1. FC Tatran Prešov)
—	DF	SVK	Zoltán Kontár (loan return to FC Petržalka akadémia)
—	DF	SVK	Jakub Čunta (to (Poland) KS Cracovia)
—	MF	SVK	Šimon Šmehýl (to Spartak Myjava)
—	FW	SVK	Ladislav Almási (to FC DAC 1904 Dunajská Streda)
—	DF	CZE	Pavel Košťál (on loan to (Czech Republic) MFK Karviná)
—	FW	SVK	Jozef Dolný (to (Poland) Podbeskidzie Bielsko-Biała)

=== MFK Zemplín Michalovce ===
In: Note: Flags indicate national team as defined under FIFA eligibility rules; some limited exceptions apply. Players may hold more than one non-FIFA nationality.

No.	Pos.	Nation	Player
—	MF	SVK	Adrián Leško (loan return from FC Lokomotíva Košice)
—	GK	CZE	Patrik Macej (loan return from FC Lokomotíva Košice)
—	DF	SVK	Michal Gallo (loan return from FC Lokomotíva Košice)
—	MF	GHA	Emmanuel Mensah (from (Czech Republic) MFK Frýdek-Místek)
—	MF	SVK	Igor Žofčák (from (Hungary) Nyíregyháza Spartacus FC)
—	FW	SVK	Dávid Škutka (from Spartak Myjava)
—	DF	SVK	Michal Sipľak (from Partizán Bardejov)
—	DF	ALB	Kristi Qose (on loan from (Greece) PAOK FC)
—	FW	ALB	Kristian Kushta (on loan from (Greece) PAOK FC)
—	MF	SVK	Ivan Kotora (from MFK Ružomberok)

Out: Note: Flags indicate national team as defined under FIFA eligibility rules; some limited exceptions apply. Players may hold more than one non-FIFA nationality.

No.	Pos.	Nation	Player
—	GK	SVK	Marián Kelemen (to (Poland) Jagiellonia Białystok)
—	MF	ESP	Samuel Bayón (Released)
—	MF	SRB	Nikola Lukić (Released and joined (Serbia) FK Voždovac)
—	FW	RUS	Maxim Votinov (Released and joined (Russia) FC Sibir Novosibirsk)
—	DF	GEO	Akaki Khubutia (Released and joined (Georgia (country)) FC Dinamo Tbilisi)
—	DF	BLR	Aleksandr Sverchinskiy (Released and joined (Belarus) Dinamo Minsk)
—	FW	SVK	Filip Serečin (Released and joined (Kazakhstan) FC Shakhter Karagandy)
—	DF	SVK	Michal Gallo (Released)
—	MF	GRE	Kyriakos Savvidis (loan return to (Greece) PAOK FC)
—	FW	SVK	Michal Hamuľak (on loan to Partizán Bardejov)
—	DF	ARG	Vernon (on loan to ŠK Slovan Bratislava)

=== 1. FC Tatran Prešov ===
In: Note: Flags indicate national team as defined under FIFA eligibility rules; some limited exceptions apply. Players may hold more than one non-FIFA nationality.

No.	Pos.	Nation	Player
—	FW	SVK	Lukáš Kubus (from (Poland) Wisła Płock)
—	MF	SVK	Dávid Leško (from FK Senica)
—	DF	SVK	Emil Haladej (from 1. FC Tatran Prešov youth)
—	FW	SVK	Erik Streňo (from FK Poprad)
—	MF	SVK	Jakub Straka (from MFK Zemplín Michalovce youth)
—	GK	SVK	Pavol Penksa (from Free Agent)
—	FW	CZE	Jakub Rolinc (from (Czech Republic) SK Sigma Olomouc)
—	MF	NGA	Musefiu Ashiru (from (Denmark) Skive IK)

Out: Note: Flags indicate national team as defined under FIFA eligibility rules; some limited exceptions apply. Players may hold more than one non-FIFA nationality.

No.	Pos.	Nation	Player
—	MF	SVK	Lukáš Hruška (to MFK Skalica)
—	MF	SVK	Viliam Macko (Released)
—	FW	SVK	Pavol Cicman (Released)
—	FW	BIH	Nermin Hadžić (Released)
—	DF	SVK	Filip Voda (Released)
—	GK	SVK	Alex Fojtíček (to (England) Manchester United F.C.)

== DOXXbet liga ==
=== MFK Skalica ===
In: Note: Flags indicate national team as defined under FIFA eligibility rules; some limited exceptions apply. Players may hold more than one non-FIFA nationality.

No.	Pos.	Nation	Player
—	MF	SVK	Lukáš Hruška (from 1. FC Tatran Prešov)
—	MF	SVK	Radoslav Človečko (from FC Lokomotíva Košice)
—	FW	SRB	Marko Milunović (from Partizán Bardejov)

Out: Note: Flags indicate national team as defined under FIFA eligibility rules; some limited exceptions apply. Players may hold more than one non-FIFA nationality.

No.	Pos.	Nation	Player
—	DF	SVK	Dávid Hudák (loan return to ŠK Slovan Bratislava)
—	GK	SVK	Martin Krnáč (loan return to ŠK Slovan Bratislava)
3	DF	SVK	Martin Dobrotka (to (Czech Republic) FC Baník Ostrava)
—	DF	SVK	Marek Hlinka (to (Czech Republic) FC Baník Ostrava)
—	FW	SVK	Juraj Piroska (Released)
—	FW	SVK	Pavol Masaryk (Released)

=== FC ŠTK 1914 Šamorín ===
In: Note: Flags indicate national team as defined under FIFA eligibility rules; some limited exceptions apply. Players may hold more than one non-FIFA nationality.

No.	Pos.	Nation	Player
—	DF	SVK	Csaba Králik (from MŠK - Thermál Veľký Meder)
—	GK	GER	Philip Poser (from (United States) Houston Dutch Lions)
—	DF	EIR	Nick Edginton (from (United States) Des Moines Menace)
—	DF	SVK	Draško Matej Marič Bjekič (from TJ Rovinka)
—	MF	BRA	Luiz Fernando (on loan from (Brazil) Fluminense FC)
—	MF	BRA	Lucas Henrique (on loan from (Brazil) Fluminense FC)
—	MF	BRA	Chagas (on loan from (Brazil) Fluminense FC)
—	FW	BRA	Peterson (on loan from (Brazil) Fluminense FC)
—	FW	BRA	Teixeira Lima (from (Brazil) Fluminense FC)
—	FW	BRA	Danilo Mariotto (on loan from (Brazil) Fluminense FC)

Out: Note: Flags indicate national team as defined under FIFA eligibility rules; some limited exceptions apply. Players may hold more than one non-FIFA nationality.

No.	Pos.	Nation	Player
—	FW	SVK	Lukáš Hutta (to (Austria) ASK Klingenbach)
—	FW	SVK	Juraj Kuba (to FK Zlaté Klasy)
—	DF	SVK	Radomír Mida (loan return to FC VSS Košice)
—	GK	SVK	Michal Sedlák (loan return to ŠK Vrakuňa Bratislava)
—	DF	SVK	Roland Csölle (to ŠK 1923 Gabčíkovo)
—	DF	BRA	Soares Pinto (loan return to (Brazil) Fluminense FC)
—	MF	BRA	Kassiano (loan return to (Brazil) Fluminense FC)
—	FW	BRA	Ze Lucas (to (Poland) Stal Mielec)

=== FC VSS Košice ===
In: Note: Flags indicate national team as defined under FIFA eligibility rules; some limited exceptions apply. Players may hold more than one non-FIFA nationality.

No.	Pos.	Nation	Player
—	MF	SVK	Nikola Đorđević (from (Serbia) FK Sloga Petrovac na Mlavi)
—	MF	SVK	Roman Begala (from FC VSS Košice youth)
—	DF	SVK	Dávid Želinský (from FC VSS Košice youth)
—	FW	SVK	Jakub Bavoľár (from FC VSS Košice youth)
—	GK	SVK	Patrik Krupa (from FC VSS Košice youth)
—	MF	SVK	Ivan Betík (from FC VSS Košice youth)
—	FW	SVK	Kristián Kuták (from FC VSS Košice youth)
—	MF	SVK	Patrik Grega (from FC VSS Košice youth)
—	GK	CZE	Jakub Kotěra (from (Germany) FC Oberlausitz Neugersdorf)
—	MF	SRB	Stefan Čikić (from (Serbia) Železničar Pančevo)
—	DF	CRO	Karlo Bilić (from (Croatia) NK Orkan Dugi Rat)
—	FW	RUS	Nikita Andreyev (on loan from (Russia) FC Zenit Saint Petersburg)
—	MF	RUS	Sergei Ivanov (on loan from (Russia) FC Zenit Saint Petersburg)

Out: Note: Flags indicate national team as defined under FIFA eligibility rules; some limited exceptions apply. Players may hold more than one non-FIFA nationality.

No.	Pos.	Nation	Player
—	MF	SVK	Milan Dimun (to (Poland) Cracovia)
—	FW	SVK	Pavol Jurčo (loan return to FC DAC 1904 Dunajská Streda and joined (Czech Republic) MFK OKD Karviná)
—	MF	SVK	Lukáš Janič (to (Austria) SC Melk)
—	MF	SVK	Kamil Kuzma (to FO ŽP Šport Podbrezová)
—	MF	SVK	Kamil Karaš (to FC Lokomotíva Košice)
—	MF	SVK	Samuel Dancák (to (Czech Republic) FK Dukla Prague)
—	MF	SVK	Juraj Hovančík (to TBD)
—	GK	SVK	Marián Kello (to TBD)
—	MF	SVK	Michal Horodník (to Partizán Bardejov)
—	FW	CTA	Jésus Konnsimbal (to FC ViOn Zlaté Moravce)
—	DF	SVK	Filip Vaško (to (Italy) Udinese Calcio)

=== Partizán Bardejov ===
In: Note: Flags indicate national team as defined under FIFA eligibility rules; some limited exceptions apply. Players may hold more than one non-FIFA nationality.

No.	Pos.	Nation	Player
—	FW	SVK	Michal Hamuľak (on loan from MFK Zemplín Michalovce)
—	GK	SVK	Richard Novák (from FK Košice – Krásna)
—	DF	SVK	Richard Nemergut (loan return from MŠK Rimavská Sobota)
—	MF	POL	Mateusz Gora (from Partizán Bardejov youth)
—	FW	SVK	Jozef Sova (from Partizán Bardejov youth)
—	MF	SVK	Michal Horodník (from FC VSS Košice)
—	MF	BLR	Valery Potorocha (from (Belarus) FC Khimik Svetlogorsk)

Out: Note: Flags indicate national team as defined under FIFA eligibility rules; some limited exceptions apply. Players may hold more than one non-FIFA nationality.

No.	Pos.	Nation	Player
—	FW	SRB	Marko Milunović (to MFK Skalica)
—	GK	SVK	Ján Čikoš-Pavličko (to MFK Skalica)
—	MF	FRA	Loïc Gagnon (to FC Spartak Trnava)
—	DF	SVK	Michal Sipľak (to MFK Zemplín Michalovce)
—	DF	SVK	Jakub Bialončík (to OFK SIM Raslavice)

=== FC Lokomotíva Košice ===
In: Note: Flags indicate national team as defined under FIFA eligibility rules; some limited exceptions apply. Players may hold more than one non-FIFA nationality.

No.	Pos.	Nation	Player
—	MF	SVK	Boris Gáll (from FC VSS Košice)
—	DF	SVK	Róbert Cicman (from FK Haniska)
—	GK	SVK	Miloslav Bréda (from MFK Skalica)
—	MF	SVK	Róbert Dický (from MFK Snina)
—	FW	SVK	Ľubomír Slinčák (from TJ FK Veľké Revištia)
—	FW	SVK	Marcel Jass (from FK Bodva Moldava nad Bodvou)
—	FW	SVK	Róbert Jano (from FC VSS Košice)
—	GK	SVK	Matej Fabini (from 1. FC Tatran Prešov)
—	MF	SVK	Kamil Karaš (from FC VSS Košice)

Out: Note: Flags indicate national team as defined under FIFA eligibility rules; some limited exceptions apply. Players may hold more than one non-FIFA nationality.

No.	Pos.	Nation	Player
—	MF	SVK	Radoslav Človečko (to MFK Skalica)
—	MF	SVK	Jakub Kinský (loan return to MFK Goral Stará Ľubovňa)
—	MF	SVK	Adrián Leško (loan return to MFK Zemplín Michalovce)
—	GK	SVK	Matúš Kira (loan return to MFK Zemplín Michalovce)
—	GK	CZE	Patrik Macej (loan return to MFK Zemplín Michalovce)
—	DF	SVK	Michal Gallo (loan return to MFK Zemplín Michalovce)
—		SVK	Dávid Šipoš (loan return to KAC Jednota Košice)

=== FC Nitra ===
In: Note: Flags indicate national team as defined under FIFA eligibility rules; some limited exceptions apply. Players may hold more than one non-FIFA nationality.

No.	Pos.	Nation	Player

Out: Note: Flags indicate national team as defined under FIFA eligibility rules; some limited exceptions apply. Players may hold more than one non-FIFA nationality.

No.	Pos.	Nation	Player

=== FK Poprad ===
In: Note: Flags indicate national team as defined under FIFA eligibility rules; some limited exceptions apply. Players may hold more than one non-FIFA nationality.

No.	Pos.	Nation	Player
—	MF	SVK	Miroslav Poliaček (from FK Pohronie)
—	MF	SVK	Peter Lupčo (on loan from MŠK Žilina)
—	FW	SVK	Viktor Maťaš (from FK Košická Nová Ves)
—	DF	SVK	Ján Hatok (from FK Pohronie)
—	MF	SVK	Miroslav Daško (from MFK Lokomotíva Zvolen)
—	FW	SVK	Samuel Lipták (from FK Spišská Nová Ves)
—	MF	SVK	Mário Kurák (from TJ Jednota Málinec)
—	FW	CRO	Pëllumb Jusufi (from (Finland) Musan Salama)
—	FW	CYP	Alekos Alekou (from (Finland) Kotkan Työväen Palloilijat)

Out: Note: Flags indicate national team as defined under FIFA eligibility rules; some limited exceptions apply. Players may hold more than one non-FIFA nationality.

No.	Pos.	Nation	Player
—	FW	SVK	Erik Streňo (to 1. FC Tatran Prešov)
—	MF	SVK	Ján Zápotoka (loan return to FK Drustav - SK Hrabovčík)
—	MF	SVK	Filip Palutka (on loan to FK Spišská Nová Ves)
—	DF	SVK	Martin Biskup (on loan to ŠK Štrba)
—	FW	SVK	Arnold Šimonek (to OFK 1948 Veľký Lapáš)
—	DF	SVK	Lukáš Janigloš (on loan to FK Svit)

=== MŠK Rimavská Sobota ===
In: Note: Flags indicate national team as defined under FIFA eligibility rules; some limited exceptions apply. Players may hold more than one non-FIFA nationality.

No.	Pos.	Nation	Player
—	MF	SVK	Peter Vasilko (from MFK Vranov nad Topľou)
—	FW	GEO	Valeri Kuridze (from FK Bodva Moldava nad Bodvou)
—	MF	SRB	Nemanja Spasojević (from (Serbia) FK Radnički 1923)
—	MF	SRB	Dejan Lačarak (on loan from TJ Družstevník Malá Mača)
—	FW	SVK	Tomáš Trabalík (on loan from MFK Lokomotíva Zvolen)
—	FW	SVK	Patrik Husaník (from FTC Fiľakovo)

Out: Note: Flags indicate national team as defined under FIFA eligibility rules; some limited exceptions apply. Players may hold more than one non-FIFA nationality.

No.	Pos.	Nation	Player

=== FK Dukla Banská Bystrica ===
In: Note: Flags indicate national team as defined under FIFA eligibility rules; some limited exceptions apply. Players may hold more than one non-FIFA nationality.

No.	Pos.	Nation	Player
—	FW	CRO	Ivan Jakov Džoni (from (Croatia) NK Rudeš)
—	FW	CZE	Josef Čtvrtníček (on loan from (Czech Republic) FC Zbrojovka Brno)
—	MF	SVK	Tomáš Bagi (from TJ Iskra Borčice)
—	MF	SVK	Vladimír Fuják (on loan from MŠK Žilina)
—	MF	CRO	Emil Hamzagić (from (Croatia) GŠNK Mladost Petrinja)
—	DF	CRO	Marko Barišić (from NK Croatia Zmijavci)
—	DF	SVK	Marián Jarabica (on loan from FK Čadca)
—	MF	CRO	Muhamed Nurediny (from (North Macedonia) FK Shkupi)

Out: Note: Flags indicate national team as defined under FIFA eligibility rules; some limited exceptions apply. Players may hold more than one non-FIFA nationality.

No.	Pos.	Nation	Player
—	MF	MKD	Tihomir Kostadinov (to FC ViOn Zlaté Moravce)
—	FW	NED	Endy Opoku Bernadina (to FO ŽP Šport Podbrezová)
—	MF	SVK	Michal Pančík (loan return to FO ŽP Šport Podbrezová and joined MFK Detva)
—	MF	SVK	Ľubomír Willwéber (loan return to JUPIE Podlavice Badín and joined (Czech Republic) MFK Frýdek-Místek)
—	DF	GRE	Nikos Pantidos (to (Cyprus) Aris Limassol F.C.)
—	FW	SVK	Martin Válovčan (loan return to MFK Žarnovica and joined FC ViOn Zlaté Moravce - Vráble)
—	MF	SVK	Mário Kurák (loan return to TJ Jednota Málinec and joined FK Poprad)
—	FW	BIH	Belmin Vila (to TBA)
—	FW	AUT	Haris Garagić (to TBA)
—	MF	SVK	Pavol Poliaček (to TBA)
—	MF	BIH	Eldar Bašović (to TBA)
—	GK	SVK	Peter Boroš (Retired)
