= Taner Ari =

Turkish footballer

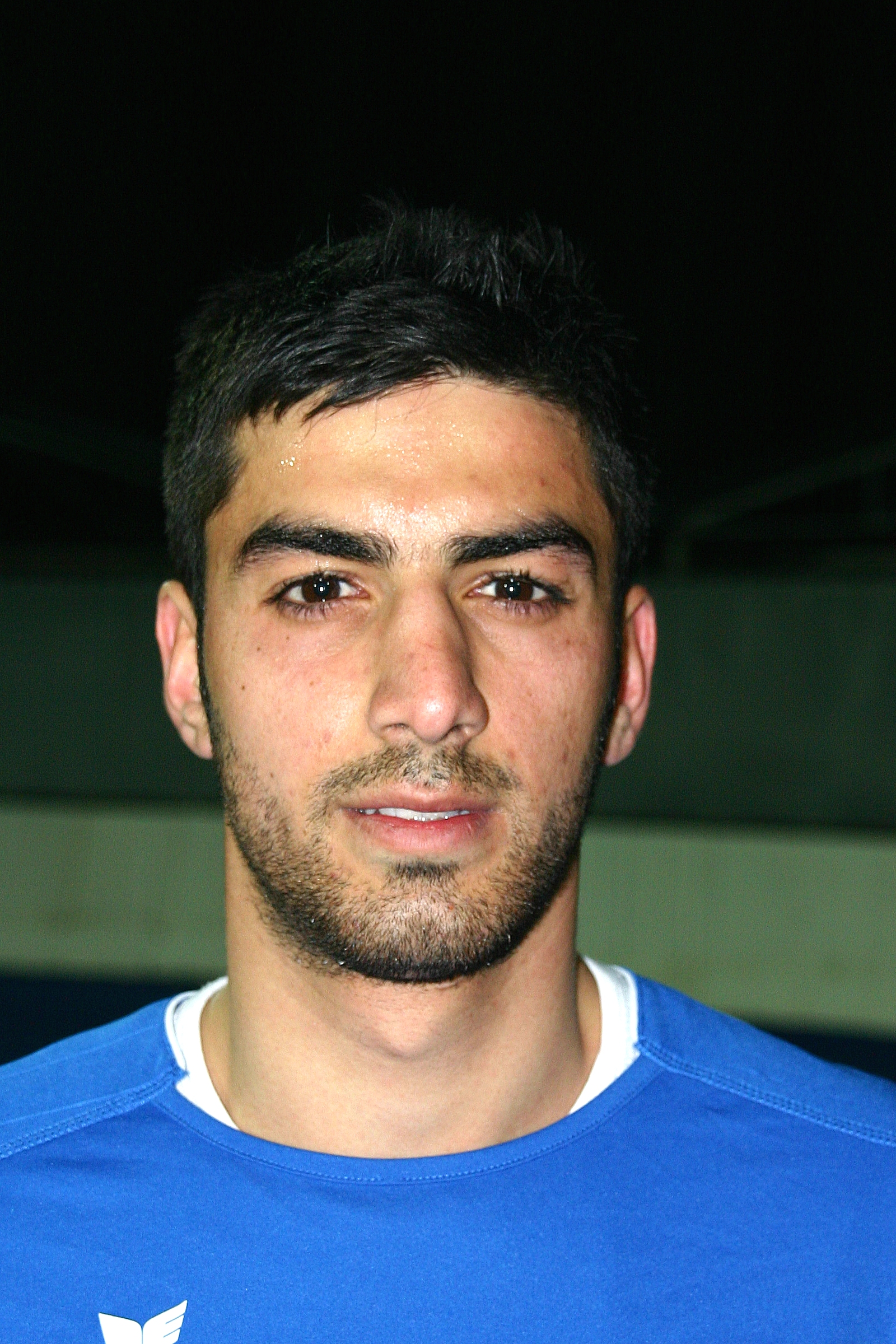

Personal information
- Full name: Taner Ari
- Date of birth: 29 May 1987 (age 39)
- Place of birth: Erzincan, Turkey
- Height: 1.81 m (5 ft 11 in)
- Position: Defender

Team information
- Current team: Batman Petrolspor
- Number: 24

Youth career
- 1995: Blau-Weiß Linz
- 1998: Ebelsberg Linz
- 1998–2003: Blau-Weiß Linz
- 2003–2004: Fenerbahçe Istanbul

Senior career*
Years	Team	Apps	(Gls)
2004–2005	Blau-Weiß Linz	44	(2)
2005–2006	UD Norte	9	(0)
2006–2007	Fuerteventura	2	(0)
2007–2008	Schwanenstadt	26	(0)
2008–2010	Wiener Neustadt	22	(1)
2010–2011	Orduspor	1	(0)
2011	Tavşanlı Linyitspor	4	(0)
2012	Ünyespor	17	(0)
2012	Denizlispor	0	(0)
2013	SKN St. Pölten	8	(0)
2014	DAC Dunajská Streda	0	(0)
2014–2015	Sivas Belediye Spor	14	(0)
2015	Batman Petrolspor	14	(2)
2015–2016	Kastamonuspor	16	(0)
2016	Batman Petrolspor	10	(0)
2016	Dersimspor		
2017-2018	Gmunden	25	(0)
2018	Esternberg	13	(0)
2019-	Gmunden	13	(0)
- * Club domestic league appearances and goals as of 3 June 2019

Taner Ari (born 29 May 1987) is a Turkish footballer who plays for Batman Petrolspor as a defender.

== Football career ==
After a brief youth spell in the country of his ancestors with Fenerbahçe SK, Ari returned to Austria and started his career with amateurs FC Blau-Weiß Linz, where he also had started his football formation. In the same level of football, he then played two years in Spain, with UD Norte and UD Fuerteventura.

Ari's first taste of professional football came in 2007, when he played in the Austrian second division for SC Schwanenstadt. Staying in the country, he made his Bundesliga debuts with SC Wiener Neustadt; in early January 2010, however, he switched back to Turkey, signing for second level club Orduspor.
