= Karol Pavelka =

Slovak footballer

Personal information
- Full name: Karol Pavelka
- Date of birth: 31 July 1983 (age 43)
- Place of birth: Partizánske, Czechoslovakia
- Height: 1.95 m (6 ft 5 in)
- Position: Forward

Team information
- Current team: FC Slovan Galanta
- Number: 10

Youth career
- FK Partizánske

Senior career*
Years	Team	Apps	(Gls)
- FK Partizánske
- FK Kysucký Lieskovec
2005–2006	FK Holýšov		
2006	→ Strakonice (loan)		
2006–2008	Vráble		
2009–2011	Zlaté Moravce	72	(24)
2012–2013	Spartak Trnava	24	(1)
2013	Karviná	13	(2)
2014–2015	Zlaté Moravce	20	(4)
2015	→ SFM Senec (loan)	8	(4)
2016–2018	SC Schwanenstadt 08		
2018	Galanta	6	(2)
- * Club domestic league appearances and goals as of 6 September 2016

Karol Pavelka (born 31 July 1983) is a Slovak football striker who currently plays for FC Slovan Galanta.
