= Martin Klabník =

Slovak footballer

Personal information
- Full name: Martin Klabník
- Date of birth: 22 November 1991 (age 34)
- Place of birth: Ilava, Czechoslovakia
- Height: 1.90 m (6 ft 3 in)
- Position: Centre-back

Team information
- Current team: SCU Günther St. Georgen/Y.
- Number: 18

Youth career
- Dubnica

Senior career*
Years	Team	Apps	(Gls)
2010–2012	Dubnica	23	(1)
2013–2014	Spartak Trnava	8	(1)
2014	→ Dunajská Streda (loan)	3	(0)
2014–2015	Gabčíkovo	0	(0)
2015	Iskra Borčice	7	(0)
2016–2017	Frýdek-Místek	41	(1)
2017–2020	Radomiak Radom	62	(2)
2020–2021	Chojniczanka Chojnice	33	(1)
2021–2022	Bełchatów	20	(2)
2022	Pohronie	27	(3)
2023	Rača	8	(0)
2023	Púchov	14	(1)
2024–	SCU Günther St. Georgen/Y.	28	(6)
- * Club domestic league appearances and goals as of 23:51, 21 November 2024 (UTC)

Martin Klabník (born 22 November 1991) is a Slovak professional footballer who last played as a defender for Austrian club SCU Günther St. Georgen am Ybbsfelde.

== Career ==
=== Club career ===
He came to Spartak Trnava in January 2013.

On 5 July 2017 he came to Polish team Radomiak Radom. He played for the club until January 2020, when he moved to Chojniczanka Chojnice. In July 2021, Klabník moved to GKS Bełchatów.

== Honours ==
Radomiak Radom

- II liga: 2018–19
