= Róbert Matejka =

Slovak footballer

Personal information
- Full name: Róbert Matejka
- Date of birth: 30 May 1996 (age 30)
- Place of birth: Bratislava, Slovakia
- Height: 1.84 m (6 ft 0 in)
- Position: Forward

Youth career
- Slovan Bratislava

Senior career*
| Years | Team | Apps | (Gls) |
| 2014– | Slovan Bratislava | 5 | (0) |
| 2014–2016 | → Slovan Bratislava II (loan) | 17 | (9) |
| 2015 | → Dunajská Streda (loan) | 0 | (0) |
| 2017 | → Petržalka akadémia (loan) | 4 | (1) |
| 2017–2018 | → TJ Rovinka (loan) | ? | (?) |
| 2020–2021 | TJ Trstená na Ostrove | | |
| 2023 | Admira Wacker | | |

International career
| 2014 | Slovakia U18 | 3 | (1) |
| 2014 | Slovakia U19 | 1 | (0) |
- * Club domestic league appearances and goals

Róbert Matejka (born 30 May 1996) was a Slovak football forward who is most known for playing with Slovan Bratislava.

== Club career ==
=== Slovan Bratislava ===
He is a graduate of the Slovan Bratislava academy. At the age of 17, Matejka made his professional debut for ŠK Slovan Bratislava against FK DAC 1904 Dunajská Streda on 22 March 2014. Coming on off the bench as a substitute in the 77th minute, he would not make an impact in the final 2–1 win for Slovan. Matejka started his first match in a 2–1 win against Spartak Trnava in the Traditional Derby, playing 54 minutes of the game. He helped Slovan win the 2013–14 Slovak League, winning his first trophy. Gradually, due to several injuries, he would lose his place in the Slovan squad and would go on multiple loans.

== International career ==
After his debut in the league, Matejka was called up to the Slovakia national under-18 team by head coach Milan Malatinský ahead of a double friendly match against Macedonia U18. He played in both matches, scoring one goal. In 2014, due to an injury just before the international break, Matejka was ruled out of the Slovakia U19 squad ahead of UEFA Under-16 Championship qualifiers.

== Honors ==
Slovan Bratislava

- Slovak First Football League: 2013–14
