= Jésus Konnsimbal =

Central African Republic footballer

Personal information
- Full name: Jésus Konnsimbal
- Date of birth: 3 March 1992 (age 34)
- Place of birth: Bozoum, Central African Republic
- Height: 1.83 m (6 ft 0 in)
- Position: Forward

Team information
- Current team: Boulogne-Péguilhan
- Number: 14

Youth career
- FC Stade Centrafricain

Senior career*
Years	Team	Apps	(Gls)
2011	Tocages		
2011–2012	Pélican		
2012	Tocages		
2013–2014	Vegetarianos		
2014	FC LM-Palúdzka		
2014–2015	Senec	17	(7)
2015–2016	VSS Košice	13	(0)
2016	ViOn Zlaté Moravce	10	(1)
2017	Saint-Priest	2	(0)
2018–2020	Montchat Lyon		
2020–2021	Tarbes Pyrénées		
2022	Toulouse Rodéo		
2022–	Boulogne-Péguilhan		

International career^{‡}
- Central African Republic U16
- Central African Republic U20
2014–2016	Central African Republic	2	(0)
- * Club domestic league appearances and goals ‡ National team caps and goals as of 21:45, 5 January 2025 (UTC)

Jésus Konnsimbal (born 3 March 1992) is a Central African football forward who currently plays for Boulogne-Péguilhan.

== Club career ==
=== FC ViOn Zlaté Moravce - Vráble ===
Konnsimbal made his professional Fortuna Liga debut for ViOn Zlaté Moravce - Vráble against Tatran Prešov on 20 August 2016.
