= Mário Tóth =

Slovak footballer

Personal information
- Full name: Mario Toth
- Date of birth: 6 April 1995 (age 31)
- Place of birth: Bratislava, Slovakia
- Height: 1.89 m (6 ft 2 in)
- Position: Centre back

Team information
- Current team: SC Grün Weiss Lassee
- Number: 21

Youth career
- –2010: SFM Senec
- 2010–2014: → AS Trenčín (loan)

Senior career*
Years	Team	Apps	(Gls)
2013	AS Trenčín	0	(0)
2014	SFM Senec	5	(0)
2014–2017	Dunajská Streda	15	(0)
2015	→ Karviná (loan)	0	(0)
2016	→ SFM Senec (loan)	13	(1)
2016–2017	→ Zvolen (loan)	15	(0)
2017	Mosta	15	(0)
2017–2018	TJ Sokol Lanžhot		
2019	SC Apetlon	12	(7)
2019	Slovan Galanta		
2020–2022	ASKÖ Klingenbach		
2022–	SC Grün Weiss Lassee		
- * Club domestic league appearances and goals as of 21:21, 1 June 2020 (UTC)

Mário Tóth (born 6 April 1995) is a Slovak football defender who currently plays for Austrian club SC Grün Weiss Lassee.

== Early life ==
Tóth was born on April 6, 1995 in Bratislava, but later relocated to Senec, where he started playing football at the age of seven.

== Club career ==
At the age of 15, Tóth went on loan to Trenčín, where he became the youth champion and winner of the Czechoslovak Cup in the U19 category. In 2014, he transferred to FC DAC 1904 Dunajská Streda. He made his professional Fortuna Liga debut for DAC Dunajská Streda against MFK Ružomberok on 26 July 2014, playing the full match of a 1–1 draw.

== International career ==
In 2015, Tóth was nominated for the Slovakia national under-21 football team ahead of matches against Norway and Ukraine in the youth Challenge Trophy.
