= Pavol Grman =

Slovak footballer

Personal information
- Full name: Pavol Grman
- Date of birth: 10 February 1992 (age 34)
- Place of birth: Czechoslovakia
- Position: Right back

Team information
- Current team: OFK Hrušovany
- Number: 27

Youth career
- Nitra

Senior career*
Years	Team	Apps	(Gls)
2012–2013	Nitra	6	(0)
2013–2014	Agrotikos Asteras	0	(0)
2014–2015	Nitra	4	(0)
2015	Vrbové		
2015	OFK Hrušovany		

International career^{‡}
2010–2011	Slovakia U-19	3	(0)
- * Club domestic league appearances and goals as of 24 January 2019 ‡ National team caps and goals as of 9 March 2012

Pavol Grman (born 10 February 1992) is a Slovak football defender who currently plays for the low division OFK Hrušovany.

== Career ==
=== FC Nitra ===
He made his debut for FC Nitra against MŠK Žilina on 9 March 2012.
