= Stanislav Smrek =

Slovak footballer (born 1986)

Personal information
- Date of birth: 1 December 1986 (age 39)
- Place of birth: Košice, Czechoslovakia
- Height: 1.81 m (5 ft 11 in)
- Position: Left-back

Youth career
- Košice

Senior career*
Years	Team	Apps	(Gls)
2005–2010	Košice	27	(0)
2006–2007	→ Michalovce (loan)	15	(0)
2010–2011	Moldava	17	(0)
2012	Táborsko	15	(1)
2013–2014	Michalovce	19	(1)
- * Club domestic league appearances and goals

Stanislav Smrek (born 1 December 1986) is a Slovak former professional footballer who played as a left-back.
