= Michal Horodník =

Slovak footballer

Personal information
- Full name: Michal Horodník
- Date of birth: 29 October 1996 (age 30)
- Place of birth: Humenné, Slovakia
- Height: 1.80 m (5 ft 11 in)
- Positions: Attacking midfielder; left winger

Team information
- Current team: KFC Komárno
- Number: 11

Youth career
- –2012: TJ Družstevník Papín
- 2012–2014: Košice

Senior career*
| Years | Team | Apps | (Gls) |
| 2014–2016 | VSS Košice | 23 | (1) |
| 2016–2017 | Partizán Bardejov | 24 | (3) |
| 2017–2019 | Poprad | 22 | (1) |
| 2018–2019 | → Partizán Bardejov (loan) | 19 | (4) |
| 2019-2020 | Partizán Bardejov | 17 | (6) |
| 2020–2021 | Skalica | 25 | (4) |
| 2021–2025 | Komárno | 62 | (2) |
| 2025– | Gabčicovo | | |
- * Club domestic league appearances and goals as of 22 June 2024

Michal Horodník (born 29 October 1996) is a Slovak footballer who plays as a midfielder for ŠK 1923 Gabčíkovo.

During his career, he had also played for the Slovakia national under-19 football team.

== Club career ==
=== Košice ===
While playing for the Košice reserves, Horodník broke a record for scoring the fastest goal, scoring in the 10th second of a match against MŠK Rimavská Sobota. He made his first league debut for Košice on 20 May 2014 against Ružomberok, entering in as a substitute in place of a future Slovak international Erik Pačinda, in the 71st minute of the game.

=== Later career ===
On 21st July 2020, it was announced that Horodník would be joining MFK Skalica.
