= Miroslav Pastva =

Slovak footballer

Personal information
- Full name: Miroslav Pastva
- Date of birth: 15 April 1992 (age 34)
- Place of birth: Liptovský Mikuláš, Czechoslovakia
- Height: 1.80 m (5 ft 11 in)
- Position: Midfielder

Youth career
- –2011: Liptovský Mikuláš
- 2007–2010: → Ružomberok (loan)

Senior career*
Years	Team	Apps	(Gls)
2011–2016	Tatran Liptovský Mikuláš	128	(1)
2016–2017	ViOn Zlaté Moravce	25	(0)
2017–2018	Pogoń Siedlce	5	(0)
2018–2022	Ibach	63	(8)
- * Club domestic league appearances and goals

Miroslav Pastva (born 15 April 1992) is a Slovak former professional footballer who played as a midfielder.

== Club career ==
Pastva made his professional Fortuna Liga debut for ViOn Zlaté Moravce - Vráble against Spartak Myjava on 16 July 2016.
