= Radoslav Ciprys =

Slovak football midfielder

Personal information
- Full name: Radoslav Ciprys
- Date of birth: 24 June 1987 (age 39)
- Place of birth: Malacky, Czechoslovakia
- Height: 1.75 m (5 ft 9 in)
- Positions: Winger; left back

Team information
- Current team: TJ Baník Brodské
- Number: 17

Youth career
- TJ Slavoj Moravský Svätý Ján
- 2003–2004: ŠKP
- 2004–2005: ŠK Malacky
- 2005–2006: Slovan Bratislava

Senior career*
Years	Team	Apps	(Gls)
2006–2007	SC Obersiebenbrunn		
2007–2010	ŠK Malacky		
2009–2010	→ Plavecký Štvrtok (loan)		
2010	Hlučín		
2011–2014	Spartak Trnava	59	(3)
2014–2015	Spartak Myjava	29	(1)
2015–2017	Skalica	20	(0)
2017–2018	USV Herrnbaumgarten		
2018–2019	TJ Sokol Lanžhot		
2019	Spartak Trnava B		
2019–	TJ Baník Brodské		
- * Club domestic league appearances and goals as of 17:59, 7 June 2019 (UTC)

Radoslav Ciprys (born 24 June 1987) is a Slovak football midfielder who plays for the TJ Baník Brodské.

== Career ==
He came to Spartak Trnava in January 2011 and made his debut against Dubnica on 16 April 2011.

In September 2017, Ciprys joined Austrian club USV Herrnbaumgarten.
