= Tamás Lénárth =

Slovak footballer

Personal information
- Date of birth: 7 June 1990 (age 36)
- Place of birth: Dunajská Streda, Czechoslovakia
- Height: 1.75 m (5 ft 9 in)
- Position: Midfielder

Team information
- Current team: Dorog
- Number: 88

Youth career
- Dunajská Streda

Senior career*
Years	Team	Apps	(Gls)
2008–2016	Dunajská Streda	52	(0)
2014–2015	→ ŠK Senec (loan)	30	(1)
2015	→ ŠK 1923 Gabčíkovo (loan)		
2016	Győr		
2016–2017	ŠK 1923 Gabčíkovo		
2017–	Dorog	185	(21)
- * Club domestic league appearances and goals as of 30 May 2023

Tamás Lénárth (Slovak: Tomas Lenarth, born 7 June 1990) is a Slovak football midfielder of Hungarian ethnicity who plays for Hungarian club Dorog.
