= Roman Sabler =

Slovak footballer

Personal information
- Date of birth: 4 September 1995 (age 31)
- Place of birth: Slovakia
- Position: Forward

Team information
- Current team: Sokol Lanžhot

Youth career
- –2014: SFM Senec
- 2012–2014: AS Trenčín

Senior career*
Years	Team	Apps	(Gls)
2014	AS Trenčín	0	(0)
2014–	DAC Dunajská Streda	27	(3)
2015–2016	→ ŽP Šport Podbrezová (loan)	23	(3)
2016	→ Spartak Myjava (loan)	6	(0)
2017–2018	→ ŠTK Šamorín (loan)	27	(2)
2018–2019	ŠTK Šamorín	14	(3)
2019	FC Stadlau		
2019–2020	ASV Spratzern		
2020–2022	Sokol Lanžhot		
2022–2025	Pamhagen		

International career
- Slovakia U19
2015	Slovakia U21	2	(0)
- * Club domestic league appearances and goals as of 2 January 2026

Roman Sabler (born 4 September 1995) is a Slovak football player who plays as a forward.

He has played 2 matches for the Slovakia national under-21 football team.

== Club career ==
=== Early career ===
Sabler started playing football at the age of seven in his hometown of Sládkovičov. Three years later, he moved to FC Senec, and when the Senec club moved to Dunajská Streda after merging with DAC, he moved to SFM Senec. At sixteen, he headed to AS Trenčín. Where he played until 2014.

=== Dunajská Streda ===
Sabler joined DAC Dunajska Streda from Trenčín in the summer of 2014 with the tag of the best scorer in the highest youth competition, signing a three-year contract with a one-year option. Sabler made his professional debut for FK DAC 1904 Dunajská Streda against his former club FK AS Trenčín on 12 July 2014. He scored his first goal for the club two weeks later, scoring in the 45th minute of a 1–1 draw against MFK Ružomberok. Sabler scored again in the next match, scoring the winning goal in a 3–1 win against FC VSS Košice. His last goal of the season would come in a 1–1 draw against Košice, scoring in the 86th minute to equalize the game after coming on off the bench a few minutes prior. Sabler played a total of 26 games in his first season for DAC.

==== Spartak Myjava (loan) ====
In 2016, Sabler joined Spartak Myjava on a loan alongside Šimon Šmehyl. He would play a total of 6 games before the results of Myjava were annulled after the club’s withdrawal from the Slovak First Football League.

=== Later career ===
In 2021, Sabler played for Czech club Sokol Lanžhot.

== International career ==
Sabler got nominated for the U21 team in 2015 for matches against Norway and Ukraine. While playing with Železiarne Podbrezová, Sabler got another call-up from the Slovakia national under-21 football team ahead of friendly fixtures against the youth teams of Jeonbuk Hyundai Motors and Lokomotiv Tashkent.
