= Tomáš Mikinič =

Slovak footballer

Personal information
- Full name: Tomáš Mikinič
- Date of birth: 22 November 1992 (age 33)
- Place of birth: Trnava, Czechoslovakia
- Height: 1.73 m (5 ft 8 in)
- Position: Winger

Team information
- Current team: Odra Opole II (player-assistant)

Youth career
- Spartak Trnava

Senior career*
Years	Team	Apps	(Gls)
2010–2017	Spartak Trnava	27	(0)
2013–2014	→ Varnsdorf (loan)	27	(5)
2014–2015	→ Zlaté Moravce (loan)	25	(2)
2015–2016	→ Podbrezová (loan)	2	(0)
2016–2017	→ Sereď (loan)	27	(3)
2017–2018	Lokomotíva Zvolen	14	(4)
2018–2024	Odra Opole	185	(21)
2024–2026	Polonia Nysa	20	(13)
2026–	Odra Opole II	0	(0)

International career
	Slovakia U17	1	(0)
	Slovakia U18	9	(2)
2011	Slovakia U19	8	(1)
- * Club domestic league appearances and goals as of 21:45, 3 June 2026 (UTC)

Tomáš Mikinič (born 22 November 1992) is a Slovak professional footballer who plays as a winger for Odra Opole II, where he also serves as an assistant coach.

== Club areer ==
=== Spartak Trnava ===
He made his debut for Spartak Trnava on 17 April 2010 against Košice.

Mikinič made his league debut in a 0–1 home loss against Slovan Bratislava on 5 August 2012, coming on as a substitute for Michal Gašparík in the 83rd minute.

On 3 July 2014, Mikinič scored a goal in the UEFA Europa League first qualifying round match against Maltese side Hibernians to set the score at 4–2, after coming on as a substitute for Martin Mikovič in the 74th minute.

In 2014, he went on loan to ViOn Zlaté Moravce.

Mikinič left Spartak in 2017, after not being able to find regular game time in a time period of over seven years.

On 7 January 2018, it was announced that Mikinič would be joining Polish side Odra Opole.
