= Michal Gallo =

Slovak footballer (born 1988)

Personal information
- Full name: Michal Gallo
- Date of birth: 2 June 1988 (age 38)
- Place of birth: Ružomberok, Czechoslovakia
- Height: 1.85 m (6 ft 1 in)
- Position: Defender

Team information
- Current team: Liptovská Štiavnica

Youth career
- 2001–2007: MFK Ružomberok

Senior career*
Years	Team	Apps	(Gls)
2007–2012	Ružomberok	66	(1)
2012–2013	Táborsko	16	(0)
2013–2016	Michalovce	74	(1)
2016	→ Lokomotíva Košice (loan)	22	(2)
2016–2017	Liptovský Hrádok		
2017–2019	MFK Ružomberok B		
2019–	Liptovská Štiavnica		

International career
- Slovakia U-19
- Slovakia U-20
- Slovakia U-21
- * Club domestic league appearances and goals as of 8 March 2017

Michal Gallo (born 2 June 1988 in Ružomberok) is a Slovak of Peruvian ascendence football defender who currently plays for TJ Družstevník Liptovská Štiavnica.
