= Patrik Mišák =

Slovak footballer (born 1991)

Personal information
- Full name: Patrik Mišák
- Date of birth: 29 March 1991 (age 35)
- Place of birth: Trenčín, Czechoslovakia
- Height: 1.84 m (6 ft 0 in)
- Position: Midfielder

Team information
- Current team: Kalwarianka Kalwaria; Hutnik Kraków (youth coach)
- Number: 15

Youth career
- Trenčín

Senior career*
Years	Team	Apps	(Gls)
2010–2011	Trenčín	4	(0)
2011	Slavoj Předměřice		
2011–2012	Bohemians Prague	10	(1)
2012–2013	Nové Mesto	30	(30)
2013–2014	Trenčín	43	(7)
2015	Baník Ostrava	22	(1)
2016–2021	Termalica Nieciecza	108	(10)
2018	→ Mezőkövesd (loan)	8	(0)
2021	Zagłębie Sosnowiec	16	(3)
2021–2024	Wieczysta Kraków	43	(24)
2024–2025	Hutnik Kraków	32	(3)
2025–	Kalwarianka Kalwaria	0	(0)

International career
- Slovakia U17
2017	Slovakia (unofficial)	1	(0)
- * Club domestic league appearances and goals as of 09:46, 15 June 2026 (UTC)

Patrik Mišák (born 29 March 1991) is a Slovak professional footballer who played as a midfielder for Polish club Kalwarianka Kalwaria Zebrzydowska. He also serves as a youth coach for Hutnik Kraków.

== International career ==
Mišák was called up for two unofficial friendly fixtures held in Abu Dhabi, UAE, in January 2017, against Uganda (1–3 loss) and Sweden. He made his debut against Sweden playing the second half of the match, when he substituted Filip Hlohovský. Slovakia lost the game 0–6.

== Honours ==
Wieczysta Kraków

- III liga, group IV: 2023–24
- IV liga Lesser Poland West: 2021–22
- Polish Cup Lesser Poland regionals: 2021–22, 2022–23
