= Miroslav Stanić =

Serbian footballer

Personal information
- Full name: Miroslav Stanić
- Date of birth: 11 December 1993 (age 32)
- Place of birth: Smederevo, SFR Yugoslavia
- Height: 1.84 m (6 ft 0 in)
- Position: Midfielder

Youth career
- FK Smederevo

Senior career*
Years	Team	Apps	(Gls)
2013–2014	Rudar Kostolac		
2013–2014	Metalac GM	14	(1)
2014	Dunajská Streda	2	(0)
2015	Leotar		
2015–2016	Smederevo		
2017	Pobeda	32	(4)
2018-2019	Sloga Požega		
2019-2020	Budućnost Krušik		
2021-2022	Smederevo		
2022-2023	Mladi Radnik		
2023	Jagodina		
- * Club domestic league appearances and goals as of 26 March 2018

Miroslav Stanić (Serbian Cyrillic: Мирослав Станић; born 11 December 1993) is a Serbian football midfielder who most recently played for Jagodina.

== Career ==
=== FC DAC 1904 Dunajská Streda ===
He made his professional debut for FC DAC 1904 Dunajská Streda against FC ViOn Zlaté Moravce on 13 September 2014.
