= Martin Juhar =

Slovak footballer

Personal information
- Full name: Martin Juhar
- Date of birth: 9 March 1988 (age 38)
- Place of birth: Košice, Czechoslovakia
- Height: 1.82 m (6 ft 0 in)
- Position: Right midfielder

Youth career
- Lokomotíva Košice

Senior career*
Years	Team	Apps	(Gls)
2008–2011	Košice	53	(3)
2011–2012	Sparta Prague	13	(1)
2012–2014	Slavia Prague	67	(9)
2015	Zlaté Moravce	9	(4)
2015–2017	Termalica	33	(3)
2017	FSV Zwickau	2	(0)
2017–2018	Brno	15	(1)
2018–2019	Diósgyőr	27	(1)
2022–2025	Spartak Medzev		
2025	Lokomotíva Košice		

International career
2006–2007	Slovakia U19	10	(1)
2009–2010	Slovakia U21	5	(1)
2013	Slovakia	1	(0)

Managerial career
- 2025–2026: Lokomotíva Košice
- * Club domestic league appearances and goals as of 9 March 2024

Martin Juhar (born 9 March 1988) is a former Slovak footballer who is currently the manager of 3. Liga club FC Lokomotíva Košice. He was a universal midfielder who played at the right or left side.

== Club career ==
Juhar made his Corgoň Liga debut in a 1–1 draw against Slovan Bratislava on 10 May 2008. He scored his first goal in a 1–1 draw against Senica on 22 April 2011.

Juhar signed a three-year contract for AC Sparta Prague on 14 June 2011, debuting in a pre-season friendly match against 1860 Munich at pre-season training camp on 23 June. He made his league debut against České Budějovice on 31 July and scored his first goal against Žižkov on 12 September.

== International career ==
On 19 November 2013, Juhar became one of the debutants for the Slovakia national football team in a goalless draw against Gibraltar.

== Managerial career ==
On 22 November 2025, it was announced that Juhar would be the manager of 3. Liga club FC Lokomotíva Košice after previously playing there.

== Personal life ==
After retiring from professional football, Juhar became an interior designer who created wooden furniture.

== Career statistics ==
As of matches played 24 December 2025

Appearances and goals by club, season and competition
Club	Season	League		Cup		Europe		Total	
Club	Season	Apps	Goals	Apps	Goals	Apps	Goals	Apps	Goals
Košice	2007–08	5	0	0	0	–	–	5	0
Košice	2008–09	9	0	3	0	–	–	12	0
Košice	2009–10	16	0	2	0	2	0	20	0
Košice	2010–11	23	3	1	0	–	–	24	3
Košice	Total	53	3	6	0	2	0	61	3
Sparta Prague	2011–12	13	1	2	0	4	0	19	1
Sparta Prague	Total	13	1	2	0	4	0	19	1
Slavia Prague	2012–13	24	3	0	0	–	–	24	3
Slavia Prague	2013–14	27	6	5	0	–	–	32	6
Slavia Prague	2014–15	14	0	0	0	–	–	14	0
Slavia Prague	Total	65	9	5	0	0	0	70	9
Zlaté Moravce	2014–15	9	4	0	0	–	–	9	4
Zlaté Moravce	Total	9	4	0	0	0	0	9	4
Termalica	2015–16	24	2	0	0	–	–	24	2
Termalica	2016–17	9	1	1	0	–	–	10	1
Termalica	Total	33	3	1	0	0	0	34	3
Zwickau	2016–17	2	0	0	0	–	–	2	0
Zwickau	Total	2	0	0	0	0	0	2	0
Brno	2017–18	15	1	0	0	–	–	15	1
Brno	Total	15	1	0	0	0	0	15	1
Diósgyőr	2018–19	25	1	2	0	–	–	27	1
Diósgyőr	2019–20	2	0	0	0	–	–	2	0
Diósgyőr	Total	27	1	2	0	0	0	29	1
Spartak Medzev	2024–25	—							
FC Lokomotíva Košice	2024–25	—							
Career total		217	22	16	0	6	0	239	22

== Honours ==
MFK Košice

- Slovak Cup: 2008–09
