= Richard Lásik =

Slovak footballer (born 1992)

Personal information
- Full name: Richard Lásik
- Date of birth: 18 August 1992 (age 34)
- Place of birth: Bratislava, Czechoslovakia
- Height: 1.84 m (6 ft 0 in)
- Position: Midfielder

Team information
- Current team: Andau
- Number: 18

Youth career
- Slovan Bratislava
- 2004–2007: Jozef Vengloš Academy
- 2007–2012: Brescia

Senior career*
Years	Team	Apps	(Gls)
2012–2014	Brescia	43	(1)
2012	→ Ružomberok (loan)	11	(1)
2014–2016	Slovan Bratislava	28	(1)
2015–2016	→ Baník Ostrava (loan)	19	(1)
2016–2018	Avellino	35	(2)
2019–2021	Teramo	20	(0)
2021	Pohronie	8	(0)
2022	Košice	10	(0)
2022	Petržalka	14	(2)
2023-	Andau	26	(0)

International career^{‡}
2010	Slovakia U18	4	(0)
2011	Slovakia U19	5	(1)
2012–2014	Slovakia U21	15	(1)
2013	Slovakia	3	(1)
- * Club domestic league appearances and goals as of 13:26, 10 January 2024 (UTC) ‡ National team caps and goals as of 10:24, 30 September 2021 (UTC)

Richard Lásik (born 18 August 1992) is a Slovak football midfielder who plays for Andau.

== Club career ==
=== Early career ===
Born in Bratislava, Lásik began his career at Slovan Bratislava before departing in 2004 for the Jozef Vengloš Academy. Lásik spent three years at the club before being spotted by renowned Brescia. On 25 January 2012, Richard joined MFK Ružomberok on loan until the end of the season. He made his MFK Ružomberok debut in the Slovak Corgoň Liga against Spartak Trnava on 9 March 2012.

On 25 August 2016, he moved to Italy and joined Avellino.

After not playing in the 2018–19 season, on 6 August 2019 he signed a 2-year contract with Serie C club Teramo.

=== FK Pohronie ===
In late September 2021, Lásik signed a deal with Pohronie of the Fortuna Liga until the end of the year, with both parties having the option to extend. At the time, Pohronie was ranked last in the league table. Upon his arrival, Lásik admitted a burden of responsibility to elevate the team in the rankings and praised the conditions in the club. He went on to be released during the winter break after competing in 8 games.

== International career ==
Lásik was a Slovakia Under-21 international and made his debut for the full Slovakia national football team on 6 February 2013 in an international friendly against Belgium in Bruges, Jan Breydel Stadium, the game ended in a 2–1 loss for Slovakia. In this match he scored equalizing goal to make the score 1–1.

== Career statistics ==
=== International ===
Appearances and goals by national team and year
National team	Year	Apps	Goals
Slovakia	2013	3	1
Total		3	1

Scores and results list Belgium's goal tally first, score column indicates score after each Lásik goal.

List of international goals scored by Richard Lásik
No.	Date	Venue	Opponent	Score	Result	Competition
1	6 February 2013	Jan Breydel Stadium, Bruges, Belgium	Belgium	1–1	1–2	Friendly
