= Pape Macou Sarr =

Senegalese footballer

Personal information
- Date of birth: 25 July 1991 (age 35)
- Place of birth: Thiès, Senegal
- Height: 1.78 m (5 ft 10 in)
- Position: Winger

Senior career*
Years	Team	Apps	(Gls)
2009–2013	ASC Diaraf	34	(5)
2013–2014	Angers	1	(0)
2015–2017	DAC Dunajská Streda	64	(7)
2017–2018	Laval B	10	(1)
2017–2018	Laval	10	(3)
2018	→ L'Entente SSG (loan)	0	(0)
2019	Olympia Radotín	11	(4)
2021	ASC Diaraf	?	(?)

International career
- Senegal U23
- * Club domestic league appearances and goals

Pape Macou Sarr (born 25 July 1991) is a Senegalese professional footballer who last played in his home country for ASC Diaraf.

== Club career ==
He started his career in Senegal with ASC Diaraf, before joining Angers in the summer of 2013. In February 2015 Sarr signed a deal with Slovak side DAC Dunajská Streda. He returned to France, to Laval in June 2017. After one season in Laval he was loaned to L'Entente SSG, but quit this arrangement without playing a game, after less than a month, and subsequently left Laval after termination of this contract.
