= Peter Lupčo =

Slovak footballer

Personal information
- Full name: Peter Lupčo
- Date of birth: 21 April 1995 (age 31)
- Place of birth: Vranov nad Topľou, Slovakia
- Height: 1.83 m (6 ft 0 in)
- Position: Midfielder

Team information
- Current team: Tatran Prešov
- Number: 17

Youth career
- Žilina

Senior career*
Years	Team	Apps	(Gls)
2012–2015	Žilina	31	(3)
2015–2016	Karviná	4	(0)
2016	Poprad (loan)	7	(0)
2017	Nitra (loan)	11	(0)
2017–2019	Lokomotíva Zvolen (loan)	?	(?)
2019	Komárno (loan)	6	(0)
2019–	Tatran Prešov (loan)	17	(3)

International career
2011	Slovakia U17	3	(0)
2013–2014	Slovakia U18		
2015	Slovakia U21	3	(0)
- * Club domestic league appearances and goals as of 8 January 2020

Peter Lupčo (born 21 April 1995) is a Slovak football midfielder who currently plays for Tatran Prešov.

== MŠK Žilina ==
He made his Corgoň Liga debut for Žilina against Spartak Trnava on 21 October 2012.
