= Marián Štrbák =

Slovak footballer

Personal information
- Full name: Marián Štrbák
- Date of birth: 13 February 1986 (age 40)
- Place of birth: Czechoslovakia
- Height: 1.87 m (6 ft 1 1/2 in)
- Position: Centre back

Team information
- Current team: Blansko
- Number: 13

Senior career*
Years	Team	Apps	(Gls)
–2005	Prievidza		
2004–2005	→ Diviacka Nová Ves (loan)		
2005–2009	Diviacka Nová Ves		
2007	→ MFK Nováky (loan)		
2007–2009	→ Borčice (loan)		
2009	Zlaté Moravce	5	(0)
2010–2012	Bánovce nad Bebravou		
2012	→ Senica (loan)	3	(0)
2012	Ústí nad Labem	12	(0)
2013	Opava	14	(0)
2013–2014	Táborsko	16	(0)
2014–2016	Zlaté Moravce	5	(1)
2015	→ Rimavská Sobota (loan)	14	(0)
2015	→ Veľký Meder (loan)		
2016	→ Borčice (loan)	7	(0)
2016–2017	Komárno		
2017–2019	ŠTK Šamorín	52	(2)
2019–	Blansko	17	(0)
- * Club domestic league appearances and goals as of 21:08, 24 November 2019 (UTC)

Marián Štrbák (born 13 February 1986) is a Slovak football defender.

== Career ==
Štrbák made his first Corgoň Liga appearance against FC Nitra.

Ahead of the 2019–20 season, Štrbák joined Czech club FK Blansko.
