= Armando Mance =

Croatian footballer

Personal information
- Full name: Armando Mance
- Date of birth: 27 October 1992 (age 34)
- Place of birth: Rijeka, Croatia
- Height: 1.87 m (6 ft 2 in)
- Position: Forward

Youth career
- Rijeka

Senior career*
Years	Team	Apps	(Gls)
2010–2014	Rijeka	10	(1)
2010	→ Grobničan (loan)	6	(0)
2012–2013	→ Pomorac Kostrena (loan)	20	(2)
2014	→ Solin (loan)	11	(2)
2014	Ružomberok	4	(0)
2015	ViOn Zlaté Moravce	22	(2)
2016	Borac Banja Luka	6	(1)
2017	Inter Bratislava	12	(2)
2019–2020	OŠK Omišalj		
2020-	NK Vinodol		

International career
2008–2009	Croatia U17	2	(0)
2009–2010	Croatia U18	9	(1)
2010–2011	Croatia U19	15	(7)
2011	Croatia U20	5	(1)
- * Club domestic league appearances and goals as of 3 April 2018

Armando Mance (born 27 October 1992) is a Croatian professional footballer.

== Club career ==
=== MFK Ružomberok ===
He made his professional debut for Ružomberok on 18 October 2014 against Dunajská Streda.

=== OŠK Omišalj ===
Mance left Inter Bratislava at the end of 2017 and was without club until September 2019, where he joined NK OŠK Omišalj.

== Personal life ==
An older brother of Antonio Mance, Armando also works as his brother's agent.
