= Toni Tipurić =

Bosnian-born Austrian footballer (born 1990)

Personal information
- Full name: Toni Tipurić
- Date of birth: 10 September 1990 (age 36)
- Place of birth: Sarajevo, SFR Yugoslavia
- Height: 1.88 m (6 ft 2 in)
- Position: Centre back

Youth career
- Post Wien

Senior career*
Years	Team	Apps	(Gls)
2006–2008	Simmering		
2008–2009	Essling		
2009–2010	Katzelsdorf		
2010–2011	Admira II		
2011–2013	Austria Lustenau	29	(0)
2011	→ Dornbirner SV (loan)		
2013–2014	Sportfreunde Siegen	14	(0)
2014	Levadia	18	(5)
2015–2016	Zlaté Moravce	42	(1)
2017	Cibalia	7	(0)
2017	Concordia Chiajna	8	(0)
2018–2019	Shkupi	33	(2)
- * Club domestic league appearances and goals as of 31 March 2019

Toni Tipurić (born 10 September 1990) is a Bosnia and Herzegovina-born Austrian professional footballer who plays as a defender.

== International career ==
Tipurić was part of the Bosnia and Herzegovina U19 squad at the 2014 UEFA European Under-19 Championship qualifying round but remained on the bench in all three games.

== Honours ==
Levadia Tallinn

- Meistriliiga: 2014
