= Milan Mujkoš =

Slovak footballer

Personal information
- Full name: Milan Mujkoš
- Date of birth: 28 May 1986 (age 40)
- Place of birth: Lehota pod Vtáčnikom, Czechoslovakia
- Height: 1.89 m (6 ft 2 1/2 in)
- Position: Centre back

Team information
- Current team: ŠKF Sereď
- Number: 5

Youth career
- OFK Baník Lehota pod Vtáčnikom
- Dubnica

Senior career*
Years	Team	Apps	(Gls)
2006–2009	Dubnica	8	(0)
2007–2008	→Žiar nad Hronom (loan)		
2008–2009	→Rimavská Sobota (loan)		
2010–	Šaľa		
2014	→ Zlaté Moravce (loan)	13	(0)
2015–	→ Sereď (loan)	16	(1)
- * Club domestic league appearances and goals as of 25 June 2015

Milan Mujkoš (born 28 May 1986) is a Slovak football defender who currently plays for the DOXXbet liga club ŠKF Sereď.
