= Peter Ďurica =

Slovak footballer

Personal information
- Full name: Peter Ďurica
- Date of birth: 3 May 1986 (age 40)
- Place of birth: Harmanec, Czechoslovakia
- Height: 1.83 m (6 ft 0 in)
- Position: Midfielder

Team information
- Current team: FC Mönchhof,

Youth career
- FK Dukla Banská Bystrica

Senior career*
Years	Team	Apps	(Gls)
2005–	FK Dukla Banská Bystrica	10	(1)
2006–2007	→ FK LAFC Lučenec (loan)	–	(-)
2008–2010	→ FK LAFC Lučenec (loan)	–	(-)
2010	FK Dukla Banská Bystrica	6	(1)
2011	TJ Baník Ružiná		
2011–2012	Viktoria Žižkov	0	(0)
2012	→Rimavská Sobota (loan)	32	(7)
2013–2014	Sisaket FC	2	(0)
2014	Zlaté Moravce	19	(1)
- * Club domestic league appearances and goals as of 3 December 2014

Peter Ďurica (born 3 May 1986) is a Slovak footballer, who plays for FC Mönchhof.

== Career ==
The midfielder played professional for the Slovak Corgoň Liga club FK Dukla Banská Bystrica.

== External sources ==
- Eurofotbal profile
- Peter Ďurica at Soccerway (archived)
