= Miloš Nikolić (footballer, born 1989) =

Serbian footballer

Personal information
- Full name: Miloš Nikolić
- Date of birth: 22 February 1989 (age 37)
- Place of birth: Svilajnac, SFR Yugoslavia
- Height: 1.82 m (6 ft 0 in)
- Position: Centre back

Team information
- Current team: Sileks
- Number: 26

Youth career
- Partizan

Senior career*
Years	Team	Apps	(Gls)
2007–2008	Teleoptik	21	(1)
2008–2010	Jagodina	11	(1)
2009	→ Dinamo Vranje (loan)	9	(0)
2010–2011	Srem	9	(0)
2010–2011	→ Metalac GM (loan)	9	(0)
2011–2012	Radnički Svilajnac	23	(2)
2012	Smederevo	11	(1)
2013	Manama Club		
2013	Radnički Svilajnac	20	(1)
2014	Sloga Kraljevo	4	(0)
2014	Zlaté Moravce	18	(1)
2015–2016	Spartak Trnava	30	(2)
2016	Příbram	2	(0)
2017–2018	Zlaté Moravce	27	(0)
2019	Zvijezda 09	10	(0)
2019	Urartu	11	(1)
2020-2021	Dubočica	23	(1)
2021-2022	Vršac	3	(1)
2022-	Sileks	89	(4)
- * Club domestic league appearances and goals as of 18 June 2026

Miloš Nikolić (Serbian Cyrillic: Милош Николић; born 22 February 1989) is a Serbian footballer who plays as a centre back for Sileks in Macedonian First Football League.

== Club career ==
Nikolić was signed by Spartak Trnava in January 2015. He made his league debut for them against Spartak Myjava on 28 February 2015.
