= Cabaj-Čápor =

Village and municipality in Slovakia

Cabaj-Čápor Cabajcsápor
- Municipality
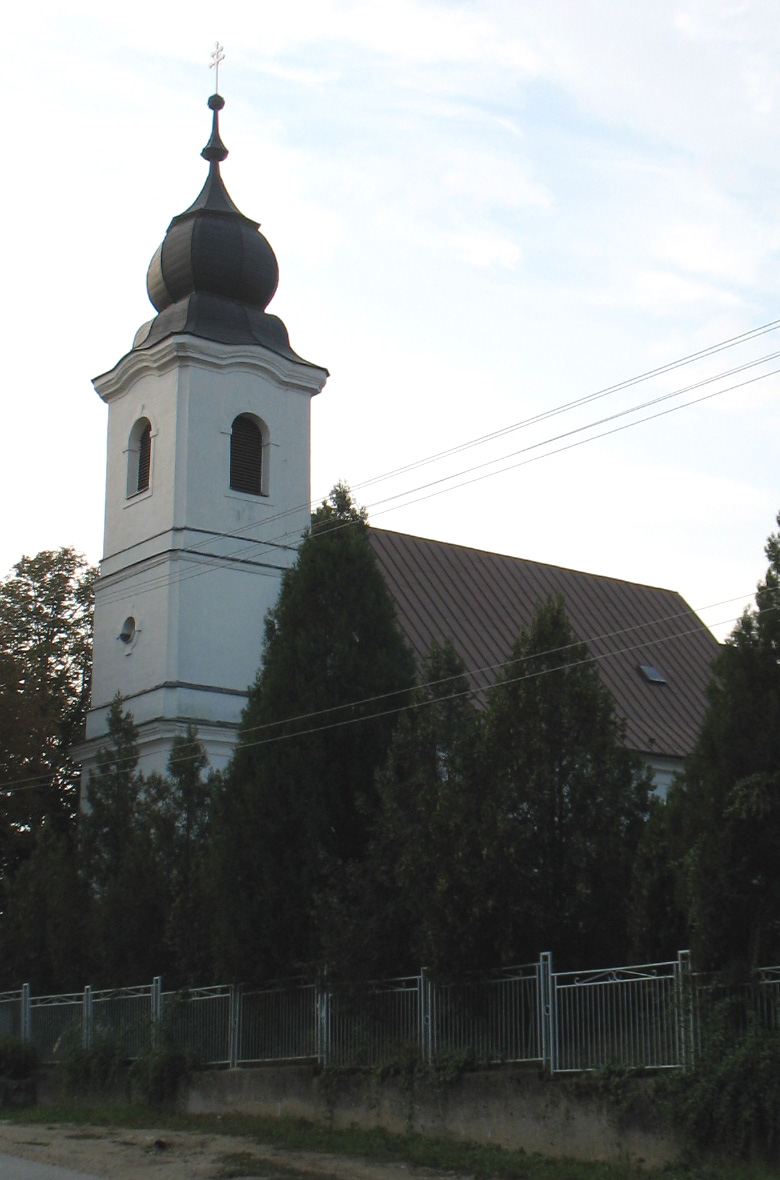

- Flag

- Location of Cabaj-Čápor in the Nitra Region Location of Cabaj-Čápor in Slovakia
- Coordinates: 48.25°N 18.03°E
- Country: Slovakia
- Region: Nitra Region
- District: Nitra District
- First mentioned: 1156

Area
  - Total: 34.42 km^{2} (13.29 sq mi)
- Elevation: 159 m (522 ft)

Population (2025)
  - Total: 4,403
- Time zone: UTC+1 (CET)
  - Summer (DST): UTC+2 (CEST)
- Postal code: 951 17
- Area code: +421 37
- Vehicle registration plate (until 2022): NR
- Website: www.cabajcapor.sk

Cabaj-Čápor (Hungarian: Cabajcsápor) is a village and municipality in the Nitra District in western central Slovakia, in the Nitra Region.

== History ==
The village was first mentioned in 1156 in historical records.

== Geography ==
The municipality lies at an altitude of 159 metres (522 ft) and covers an area of 34.42 km^{2} (13.29 sq mi) (2025).

== Population ==
Population statistic (10 years)
Year	1995	2005	2015	2025
Count	3310	3626	4118	4403
Difference		+9.54%	+13.56%	+6.92%

Population statistic
Year	2024	2025
Count	4358	4403
Difference		+1.03%

It has a population of 4403 people (31 December 2025).

=== Ethnicity ===
Census 2021 (1+%)
Ethnicity	Number	Fraction
Slovak	3925	91.38%
Not found out	364	8.47%
Total	4295	

In year 2021 was 4295 people by ethnicity 3925 as Slovak, 364 as Not found out, 20 as Czech, 13 as Hungarian, 8 as Romani, 8 as Russian, 7 as Other, 4 as Italian, 3 as Chinese, 3 as Austrian, 3 as Moravian, 3 as Croatian, 2 as Polish, 1 as Ukrainian, 1 as Rusyn, 1 as German and 1 as French.

Note on population: The difference values of population numbers in the table "Population statistic" and in the sections "Ethnicity" & "Religion" is caused by the use of various statistical methods.

=== Religion ===
Census 2021 (1+%)
Religion	Number	Fraction
Roman Catholic Church	2919	67.96%
None	872	20.3%
Not found out	356	8.29%
Total	4295	

In year 2021 was 4295 people by religion 2919 from Roman Catholic Church, 872 from None, 356 from Not found out, 30 from Greek Catholic Church, 29 from Evangelical Church, 21 from Christian Congregations in Slovakia, 19 from Ad hoc movements, 11 from Calvinist Church, 10 from Other and not ascertained christian church, 7 from Other, 5 from Eastern Orthodox Church, 3 from Seventh-day Adventist Church, 3 from Buddhism, 2 from Old Catholic Church, 2 from Paganism and natural spirituality, 2 from Hinduism, 1 from Jehovah's Witnesses, 1 from United Methodist Church, 1 from Church of Jesus Christ of Latter-day Saints and 1 from Apostolic Church.

== Facilities ==
The village has a public library and football pitch.

== See also ==
- List of municipalities and towns in Slovakia

== Genealogical resources ==
The records for genealogical research are available at the state archive in Nitra (Slovak: Štátny archív v Nitre).

- Roman Catholic church records (births/marriages/deaths): 1763–1899 (parish A)
- Lutheran church records (births/marriages/deaths): 1887–1954 (parish B)
