= Žitavce =

Žitavce Zsitvagyarmat
- Municipality
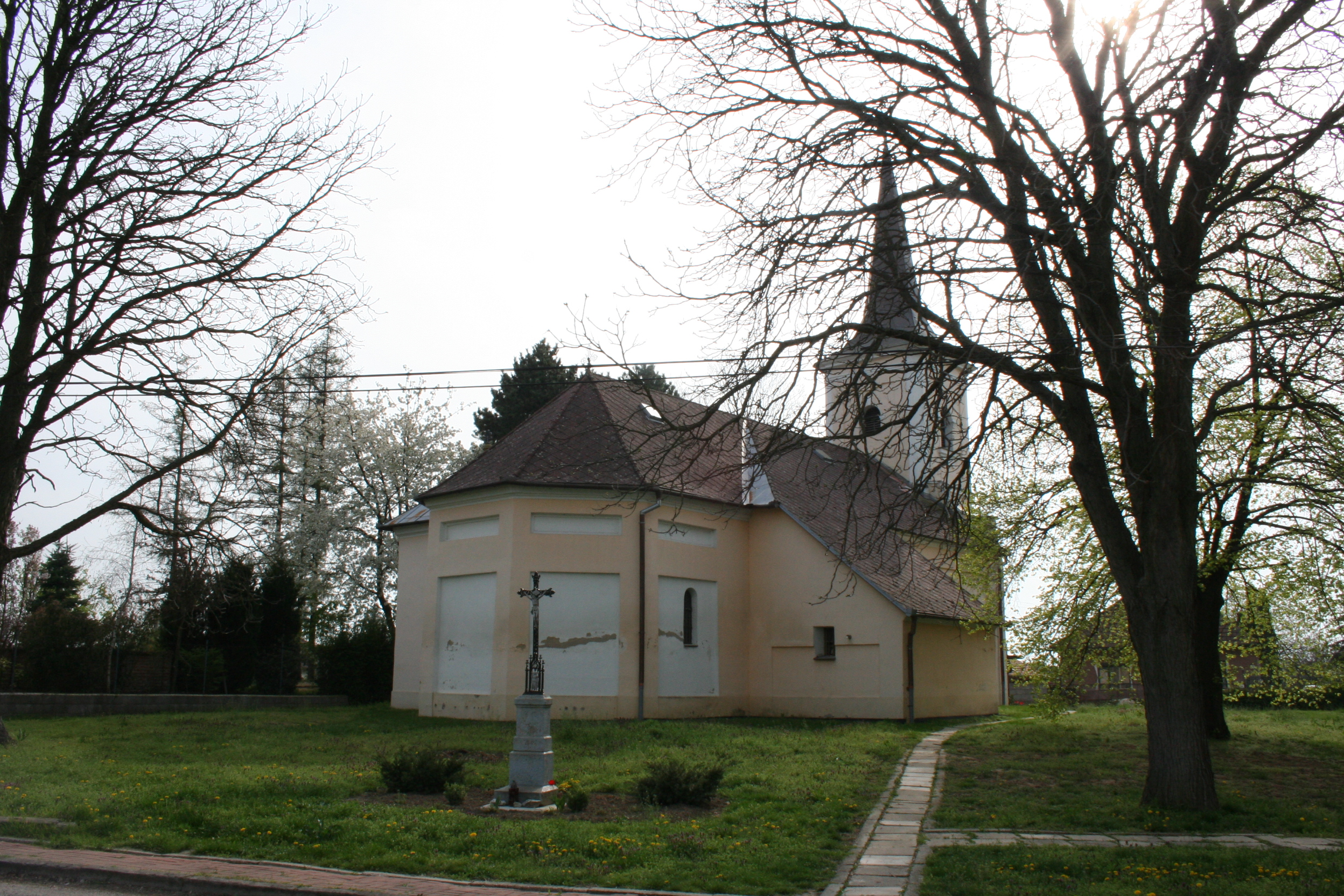
- Catholic church

- Flag

- Location of Žitavce in the Nitra Region Location of Žitavce in Slovakia
- Coordinates: 48.20°N 18.30°E
- Country: Slovakia
- Region: Nitra Region
- District: Nitra District
- First mentioned: 1232

Area
  - Total: 8.28 km^{2} (3.20 sq mi)
- Elevation: 141 m (463 ft)

Population (2025)
  - Total: 397
- Time zone: UTC+1 (CET)
  - Summer (DST): UTC+2 (CEST)
- Postal code: 952 01
- Area code: +421 37
- Vehicle registration plate (until 2022): NR
- Website: www.zitavce.sk

Žitavce, formerly Žitavské Ďarmoty (Hungarian: Zsitvagyarmat) is a village and municipality in the Nitra District in western central Slovakia, in the Nitra Region.

== History ==
In historical records the village was first mentioned in 1232.

== Geography ==
The municipality lies at an altitude of 141 metres (463 ft) and covers an area of 8.28 km^{2} (3.20 sq mi) (2025).

== Population ==
Population statistic (10 years)
Year	1995	2005	2015	2025
Count	324	341	378	397
Difference		+5.24%	+10.85%	+5.02%

Population statistic
Year	2024	2025
Count	396	397
Difference		+0.25%

It has a population of 397 people (31 December 2025).

=== Ethnicity ===
Census 2021 (1+ %)
Ethnicity	Number	Fraction
Slovak	386	93.68%
Not found out	22	5.33%
Total	412	

In year 2021 was 412 people by ethnicity 386 as Slovak, 22 as Not found out, 3 as Hungarian, 1 as Czech, 1 as Ukrainian, 1 as Polish and 1 as Greek.

Note on population: The difference values of population numbers in the table "Population statistic" and in the sections "Ethnicity" & "Religion" is caused by the use of various statistical methods.

=== Religion ===
Census 2021 (1+ %)
Religion	Number	Fraction
Roman Catholic Church	261	63.35%
None	119	28.88%
Not found out	22	5.34%
Total	412	

In year 2021 was 412 people by religion 261 from Roman Catholic Church, 119 from None, 22 from Not found out, 2 from Evangelical Church, 2 from Ad hoc movements, 1 from Calvinist Church, 1 from Eastern Orthodox Church, 1 from Christian Congregations in Slovakia, 1 from Islam, 1 from Other and 1 from Greek Catholic Church.
