= Telince =

Village in Nitra Region, Slovakia

Telince Tild
- Municipality
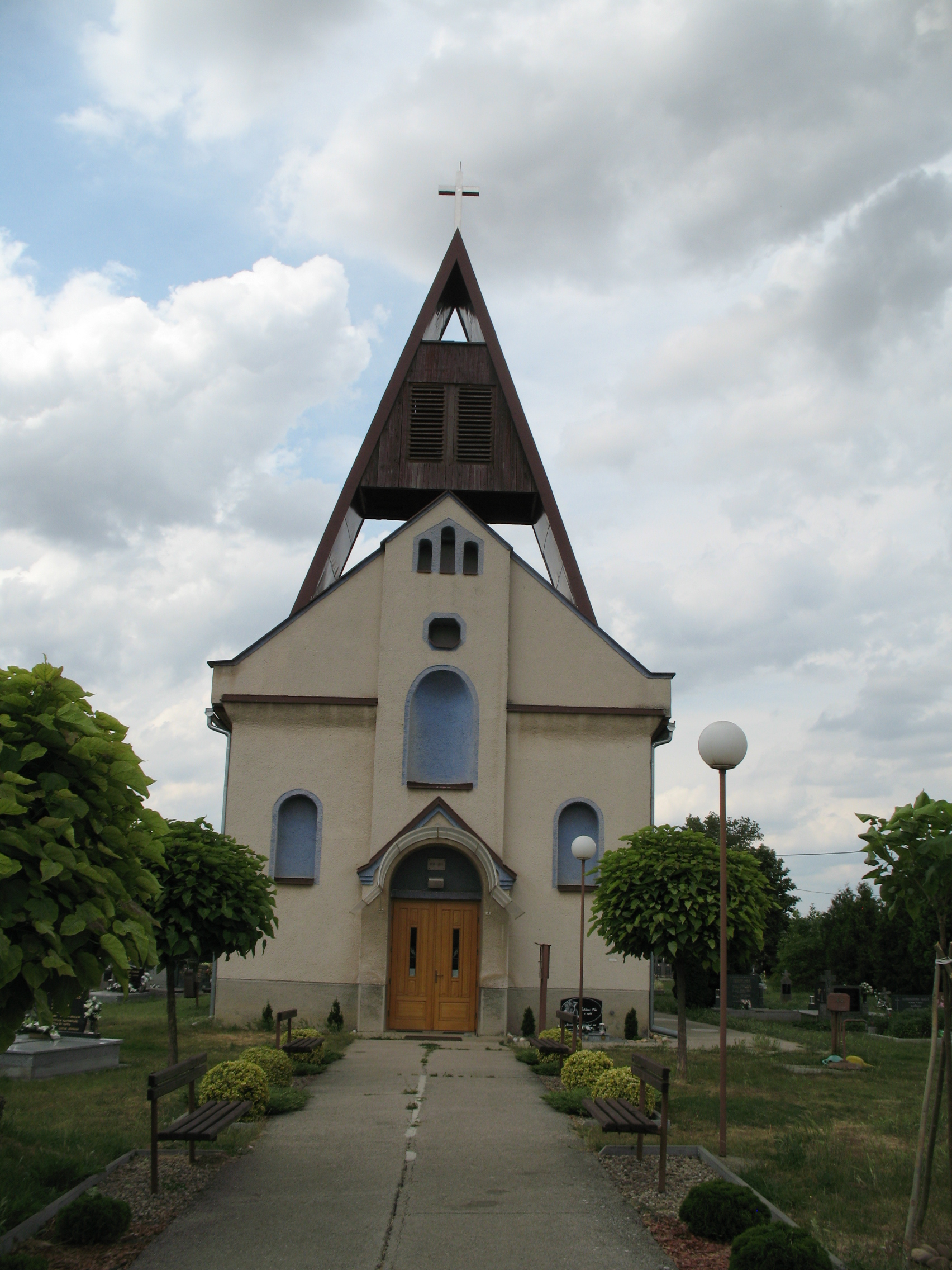

- Flag

- Location of Telince in the Nitra Region Location of Telince in Slovakia
- Coordinates: 48.23°N 18.37°E
- Country: Slovakia
- Region: Nitra Region
- District: Nitra District
- First mentioned: 1297

Area
  - Total: 6.84 km^{2} (2.64 sq mi)
- Elevation: 162 m (531 ft)

Population (2025)
  - Total: 429
- Time zone: UTC+1 (CET)
  - Summer (DST): UTC+2 (CEST)
- Postal code: 951 61
- Area code: +421 37
- Vehicle registration plate (until 2022): NR
- Website: www.telince.sk

Telince (Hungarian: Tild) is a village and municipality in the Nitra District in western central Slovakia, in the Nitra Region.

== History ==
In historical records the village was first mentioned in 1297.

== Geography ==
The municipality lies at an altitude of 162 metres (531 ft) and covers an area of 6.84 km^{2} (2.64 sq mi) (2025).

== Population ==
Population statistic (10 years)
Year	1995	2005	2015	2025
Count	279	341	409	429
Difference		+22.22%	+19.94%	+4.88%

Population statistic
Year	2024	2025
Count	437	429
Difference		−1.83%

It has a population of 429 people (31 December 2025).

=== Ethnicity ===
Census 2021 (1+ %)
Ethnicity	Number	Fraction
Slovak	360	85.71%
Not found out	39	9.28%
Hungarian	27	6.42%
Total	420	

In year 2021 was 420 people by ethnicity 360 as Slovak, 39 as Not found out, 27 as Hungarian, 3 as Czech, 2 as Romanian and 1 as Russian.

Note on population: The difference values of population numbers in the table "Population statistic" and in the sections "Ethnicity" & "Religion" is caused by the use of various statistical methods.

=== Religion ===
Census 2021 (1+ %)
Religion	Number	Fraction
Roman Catholic Church	292	69.52%
None	69	16.43%
Not found out	39	9.29%
Evangelical Church	9	2.14%
Total	420	

In year 2021 was 420 people by religion 292 from Roman Catholic Church, 69 from None, 39 from Not found out, 9 from Evangelical Church, 3 from Calvinist Church, 3 from Greek Catholic Church, 1 from Old Catholic Church, 1 from Paganism and natural spirituality, 1 from Christian Congregations in Slovakia, 1 from Other and 1 from Buddhism.
