= Štitáre =

Štitáre Alsócsitár
- Municipality
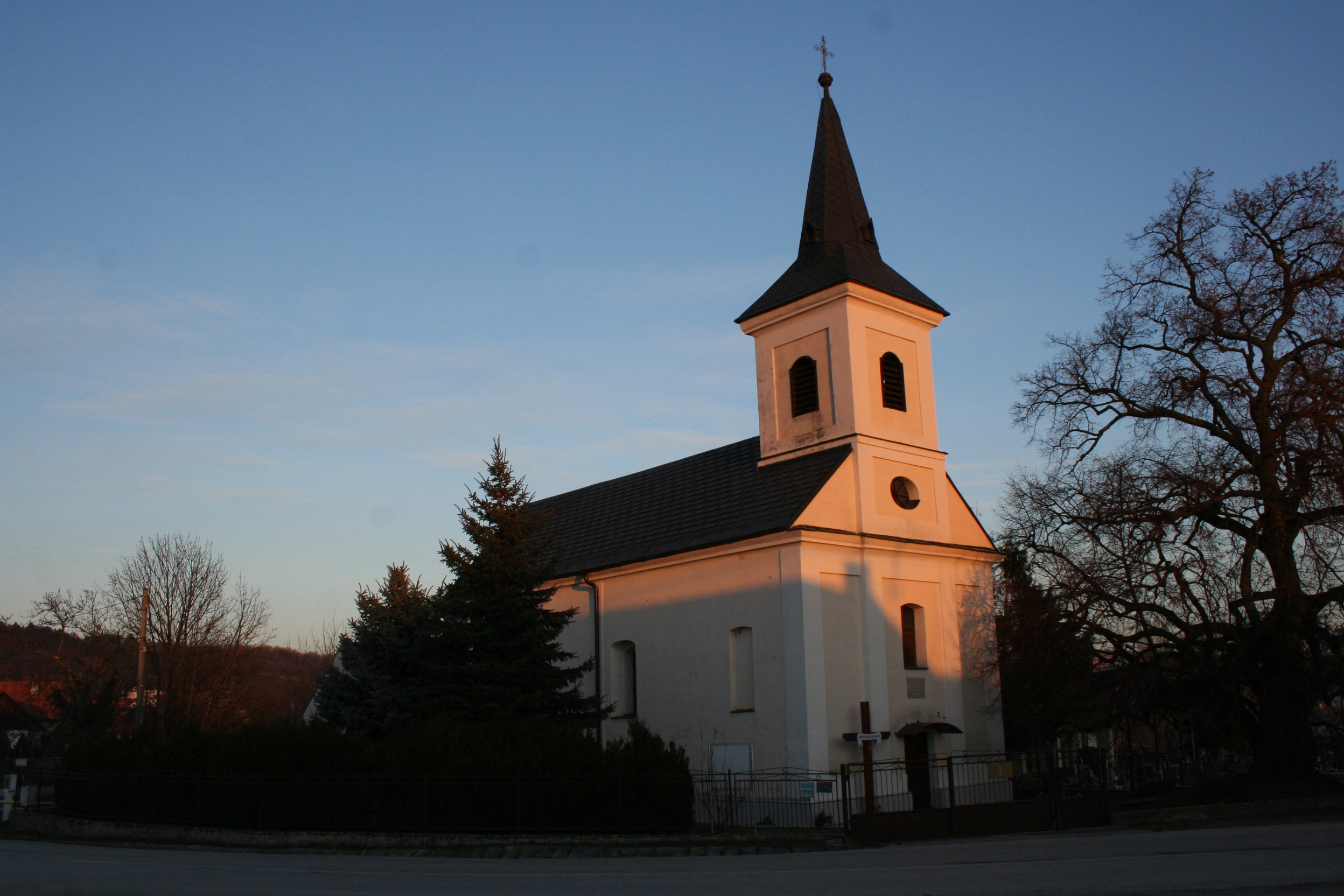

- Flag

- Location of Štitáre in the Nitra Region Location of Štitáre in Slovakia
- Coordinates: 48.35°N 18.16°E
- Country: Slovakia
- Region: Nitra Region
- District: Nitra District
- First mentioned: 1113

Area
  - Total: 0.00 km^{2} (0 sq mi)
- Elevation: 244 m (801 ft)

Population (2025)
  - Total: 1,289
- Time zone: UTC+1 (CET)
  - Summer (DST): UTC+2 (CEST)
- Postal code: 951 01
- Area code: +421 37
- Vehicle registration plate (until 2022): NR

Štitáre (Hungarian: Alsócsitár) is a village and municipality in the Nitra District in western central Slovakia, in the Nitra Region.

== Geography ==
The municipality lies at an altitude of 244 metres (801 ft) and covers an area of 0.00 km^{2} (0 sq mi) (2025). It lies 7 km north-east to the historic city of Nitra. It is surrounded by Zobor mountain range in the north and agricultural fields in the south.

== Population ==
Population statistic (10 years)
Year	1995	2005	2015	2025
Count	0	623	837	1289
Difference		–	+34.34%	+54.00%

Population statistic
Year	2024	2025
Count	1263	1289
Difference		+2.05%

It has a population of 1289 people (31 December 2025).

=== Ethnicity ===
Census 2021 (1+ %)
Ethnicity	Number	Fraction
Slovak	853	82.97%
Hungarian	171	16.63%
Not found out	31	3.01%
Czech	12	1.16%
Total	1028	

In year 2021 was 1028 people by ethnicity 853 as Slovak, 171 as Hungarian, 31 as Not found out, 12 as Czech, 6 as Russian, 6 as Other, 5 as Ukrainian, 1 as Rusyn, 1 as Romanian, 1 as Polish, 1 as Greek and 1 as French.

Note on population: The difference values of population numbers in the table "Population statistic" and in the sections "Ethnicity" & "Religion" is caused by the use of various statistical methods.

=== Religion ===
Census 2021 (1+ %)
Religion	Number	Fraction
Roman Catholic Church	678	65.95%
None	262	25.49%
Not found out	30	2.92%
Evangelical Church	20	1.95%
Total	1028	

In year 2021 was 1028 people by religion 678 from Roman Catholic Church, 262 from None, 30 from Not found out, 20 from Evangelical Church, 10 from Ad hoc movements, 9 from Eastern Orthodox Church, 7 from Greek Catholic Church, 2 from Calvinist Church, 2 from Jehovah's Witnesses, 2 from Other, 1 from Paganism and natural spirituality, 1 from Other and not ascertained christian church, 1 from Christian Congregations in Slovakia, 1 from Islam, 1 from Church of Jesus Christ of Latter-day Saints and 1 from Buddhism.
