= Čifáre =

Village and municipality in Slovakia

Čifáre Csiffár
- Municipality
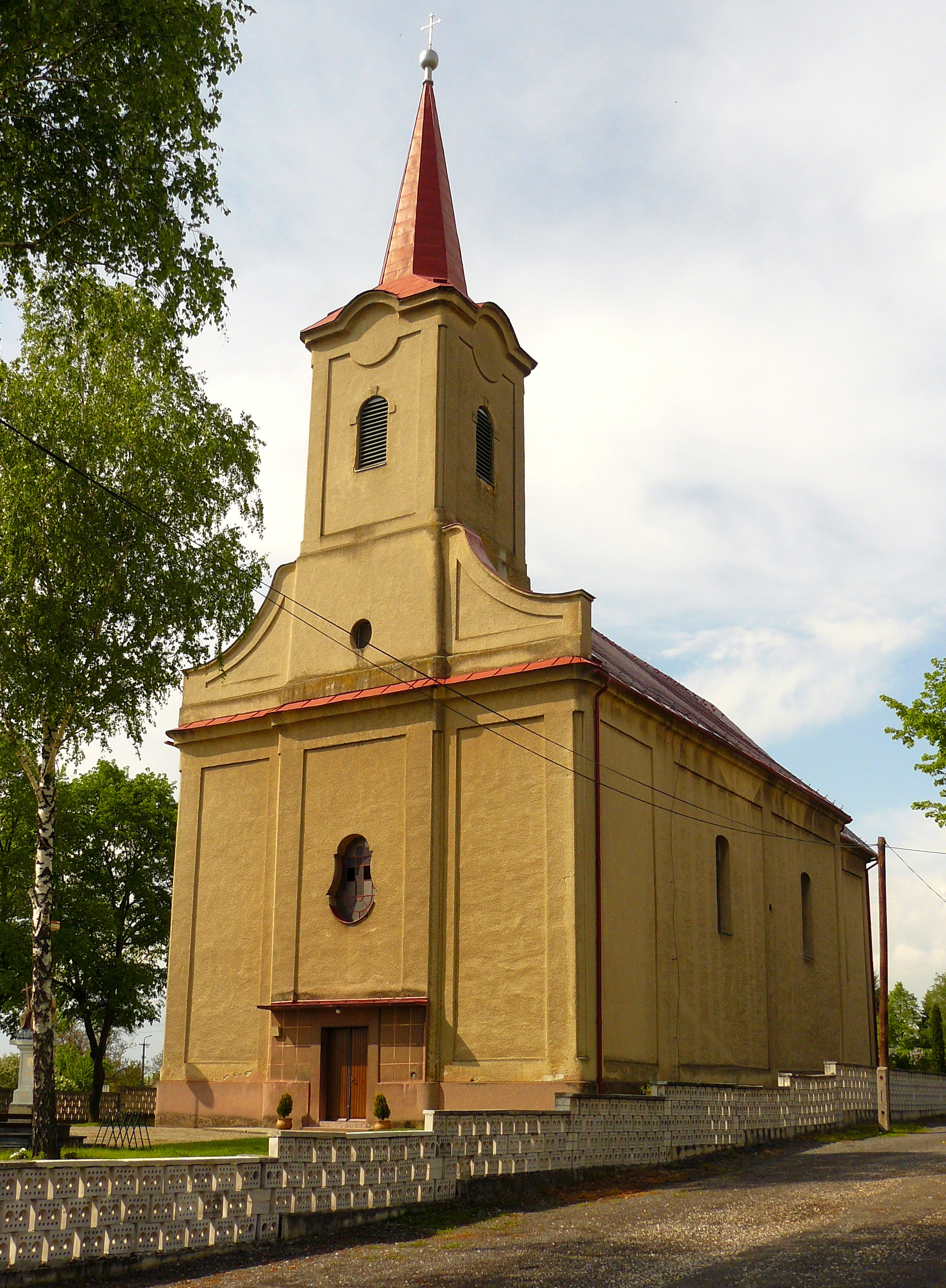

- Flag

- Location of Čifáre in the Nitra Region Location of Čifáre in Slovakia
- Coordinates: 48.23°N 18.40°E
- Country: Slovakia
- Region: Nitra Region
- District: Nitra District
- First mentioned: 1209

Area
  - Total: 15.33 km^{2} (5.92 sq mi)
- Elevation: 170 m (560 ft)

Population (2025)
  - Total: 586
- Time zone: UTC+1 (CET)
  - Summer (DST): UTC+2 (CEST)
- Postal code: 951 61
- Area code: +421 37
- Vehicle registration plate (until 2022): NR
- Website: www.cifare.sk

Čifáre (Hungarian: Csiffár) is a village and municipality in the Nitra District in western central Slovakia, in the Nitra Region.

== History ==
In historical records the village was first mentioned in 1209.

== Geography ==
The municipality lies at an altitude of 170 metres (560 ft) and covers an area of 15.33 km^{2} (5.92 sq mi) (2025).

== Population ==
Population statistic (10 years)
Year	1995	2005	2015	2025
Count	590	629	606	586
Difference		+6.61%	−3.65%	−3.30%

Population statistic
Year	2024	2025
Count	591	586
Difference		−0.84%

It has a population of 586 people (31 December 2025).

=== Ethnicity ===
Census 2021 (1+ %)
Ethnicity	Number	Fraction
Slovak	478	80.2%
Hungarian	115	19.29%
Not found out	25	4.19%
Total	596	

In year 2021 was 596 people by ethnicity 478 as Slovak, 115 as Hungarian, 25 as Not found out, 2 as Czech, 2 as Other, 1 as Ukrainian, 1 as Romani, 1 as Rusyn and 1 as Russian.

Note on population: The difference values of population numbers in the table "Population statistic" and in the sections "Ethnicity" & "Religion" is caused by the use of various statistical methods.

=== Religion ===
Census 2021 (1+ %)
Religion	Number	Fraction
Roman Catholic Church	443	74.33%
None	101	16.95%
Not found out	23	3.86%
Greek Catholic Church	11	1.85%
Christian Congregations in Slovakia	6	1.01%
Total	596	

In year 2021 was 596 people by religion 443 from Roman Catholic Church, 101 from None, 23 from Not found out, 11 from Greek Catholic Church, 6 from Christian Congregations in Slovakia, 5 from Ad hoc movements, 2 from Calvinist Church, 1 from Old Catholic Church, 1 from Jehovah's Witnesses, 1 from Other, 1 from United Methodist Church and 1 from Evangelical Church.

== Facilities ==
The village has a football pitch.

== Genealogical resources ==
The records for genealogical research are available at the state archive "Statny Archiv in Nitra, Slovakia"

- Roman Catholic church records (births/marriages/deaths): 1711-1937 (parish A)
- Lutheran church records (births/marriages/deaths): 1845-1898 (parish B)
- Reformated church records (births/marriages/deaths): 1827-1895 (parish B)

== See also ==
- List of municipalities and towns in Slovakia
