= Malé Chyndice =

Village and municipality in Slovakia

Malé Chyndice Kishind
- Municipality
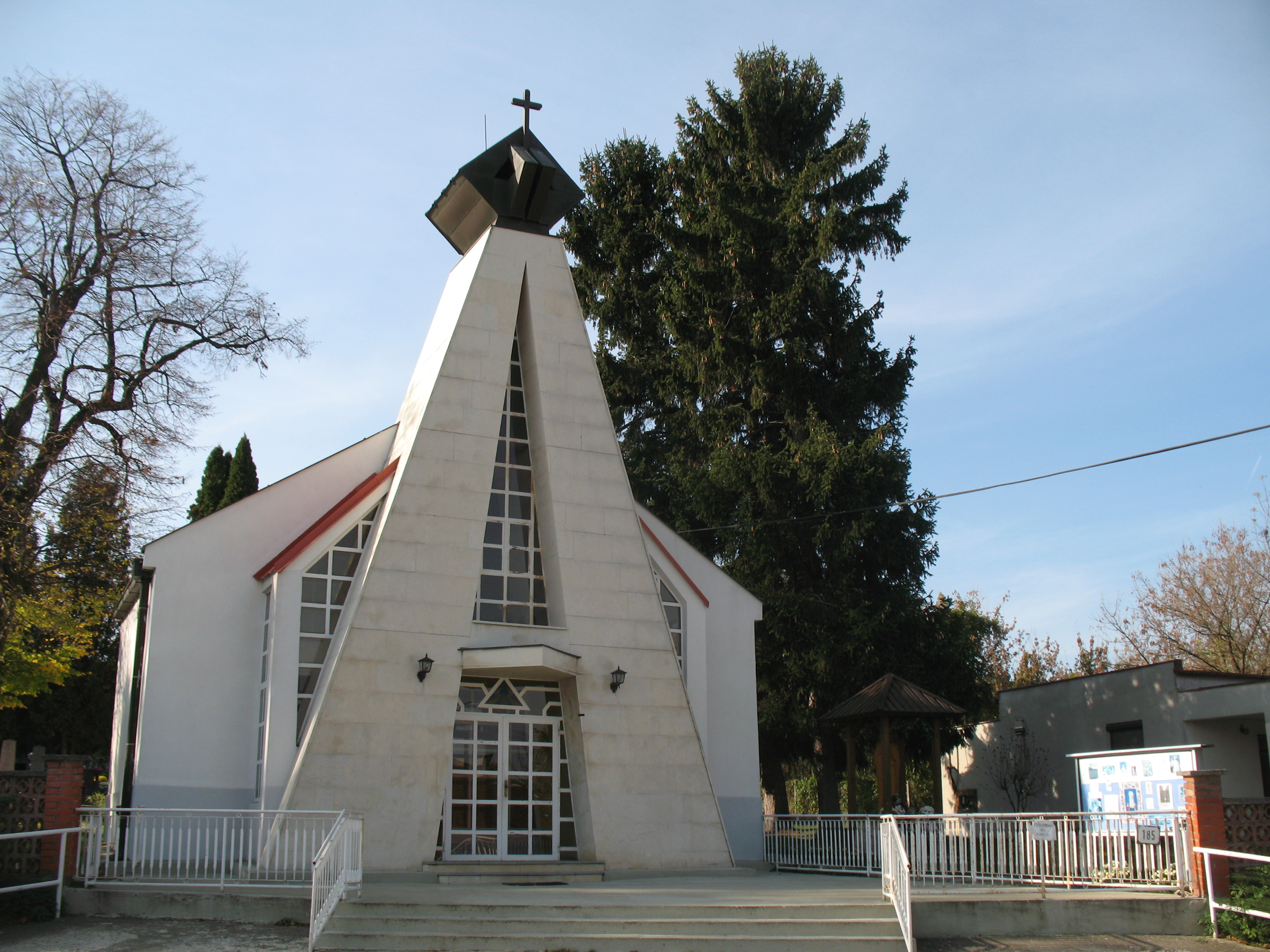

- Flag

- Location of Malé Chyndice in the Nitra Region Location of Malé Chyndice in Slovakia
- Coordinates: 48.30°N 18.28°E
- Country: Slovakia
- Region: Nitra Region
- District: Nitra District
- First mentioned: 1264

Area
  - Total: 7.88 km^{2} (3.04 sq mi)
- Elevation: 188 m (617 ft)

Population (2025)
  - Total: 394
- Time zone: UTC+1 (CET)
  - Summer (DST): UTC+2 (CEST)
- Postal code: 951 54
- Area code: +421 37
- Vehicle registration plate (until 2022): NR
- Website: www.malechyndice.sk

Malé Chyndice (Hungarian: Kishind) is a village and municipality in the Nitra District in western central Slovakia, in the Nitra Region.

== History ==
In historical records the village was first mentioned in 1113.

== Geography ==
The municipality lies at an altitude of 188 metres (617 ft) and covers an area of 7.88 km^{2} (3.04 sq mi) (2025).

== Population ==
Population statistic (10 years)
Year	1995	2005	2015	2025
Count	394	396	387	394
Difference		+0.50%	−2.27%	+1.80%

Population statistic
Year	2024	2025
Count	389	394
Difference		+1.28%

It has a population of 394 people (31 December 2025).

=== Ethnicity ===
Census 2021 (1+ %)
Ethnicity	Number	Fraction
Slovak	364	94.3%
Not found out	16	4.14%
Total	386	

In year 2021 was 386 people by ethnicity 364 as Slovak, 16 as Not found out, 3 as Czech, 2 as Austrian, 1 as Russian, 1 as German and 1 as Hungarian.

Note on population: The difference values of population numbers in the table "Population statistic" and in the sections "Ethnicity" & "Religion" is caused by the use of various statistical methods.

=== Religion ===
Census 2021 (1+ %)
Religion	Number	Fraction
Roman Catholic Church	276	71.5%
None	82	21.24%
Not found out	18	4.66%
Total	386	

In year 2021 was 386 people by religion 276 from Roman Catholic Church, 82 from None, 18 from Not found out, 3 from Christian Congregations in Slovakia, 3 from Greek Catholic Church, 3 from Evangelical Church and 1 from Calvinist Church.

== Facilities ==
The village has a public library a gym and football pitch.
