= Hruboňovo =

Municipality of Slovakia

Hruboňovo Szulányvicsáp
- Municipality
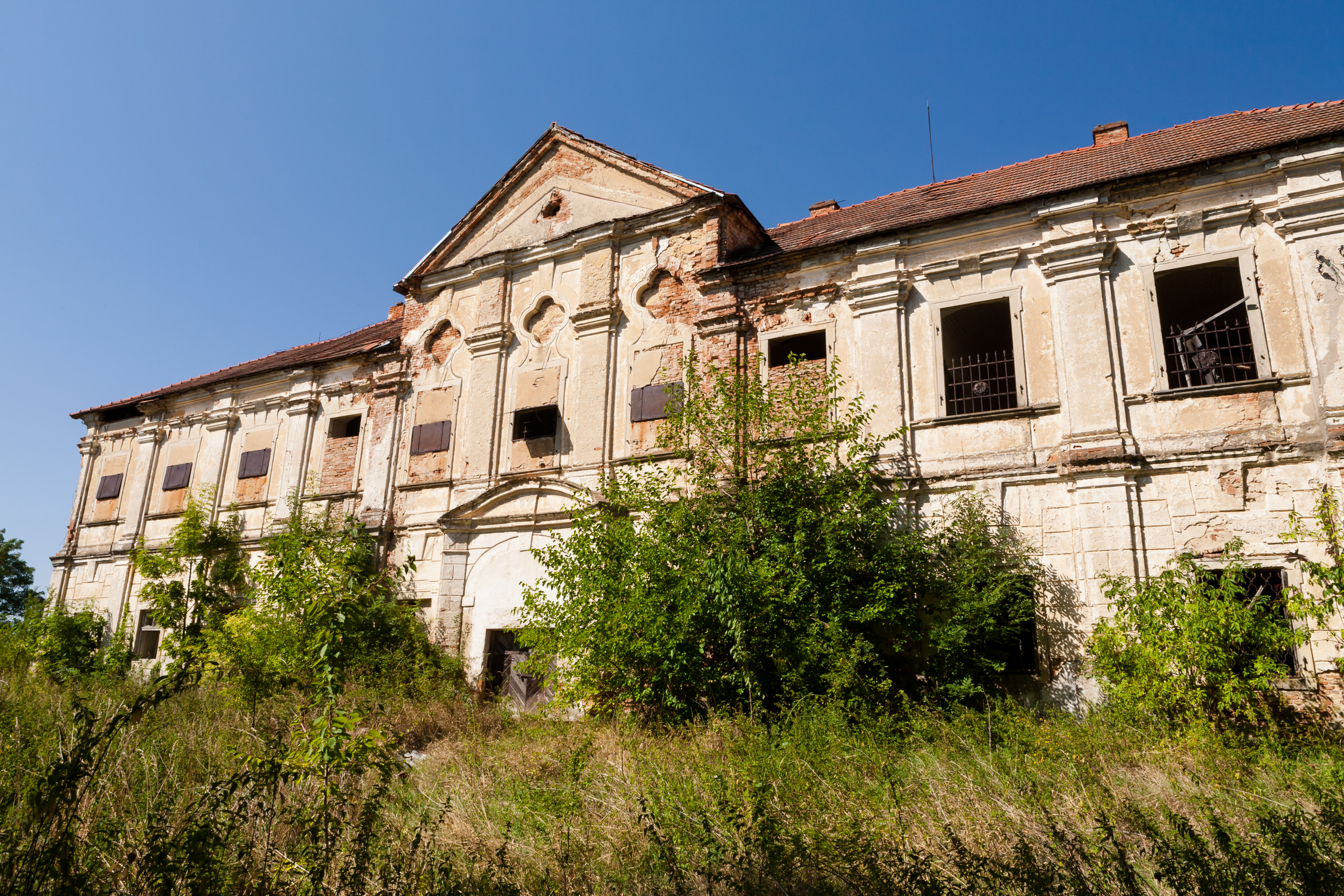

- Flag

- Location of Hruboňovo in the Nitra Region Location of Hruboňovo in Slovakia
- Coordinates: 48.45°N 18.02°E
- Country: Slovakia
- Region: Nitra Region
- District: Nitra District
- First mentioned: 1247

Area
  - Total: 11.55 km^{2} (4.46 sq mi)
- Elevation: 162 m (531 ft)

Population (2025)
  - Total: 591
- Time zone: UTC+1 (CET)
  - Summer (DST): UTC+2 (CEST)
- Postal code: 951 25
- Area code: +421 37
- Vehicle registration plate (until 2022): NR
- Website: www.hrubonovo.sk

Hruboňovo (Hungarian: Szulányvicsáp) is a village and municipality in the Nitra District in western central Slovakia, in the Nitra Region.

== History ==
In historical records the village was first mentioned in 1247.

== Geography ==
The municipality lies at an altitude of 162 metres (531 ft) and covers an area of 11.55 km^{2} (4.46 sq mi) (2025).

== Population ==
Population statistic (10 years)
Year	1995	2005	2015	2025
Count	466	476	510	591
Difference		+2.14%	+7.14%	+15.88%

Population statistic
Year	2024	2025
Count	588	591
Difference		+0.51%

It has a population of 591 people (31 December 2025).

=== Ethnicity ===
Census 2021 (1+ %)
Ethnicity	Number	Fraction
Slovak	502	95.43%
Not found out	20	3.8%
Other	7	1.33%
Total	526	

In year 2021 was 526 people by ethnicity 502 as Slovak, 20 as Not found out, 7 as Other, 2 as Czech and 1 as Russian.

Note on population: The difference values of population numbers in the table "Population statistic" and in the sections "Ethnicity" & "Religion" is caused by the use of various statistical methods.

=== Religion ===
Census 2021 (1+ %)
Religion	Number	Fraction
Roman Catholic Church	391	74.33%
None	96	18.25%
Not found out	25	4.75%
Total	526	

In year 2021 was 526 people by religion 391 from Roman Catholic Church, 96 from None, 25 from Not found out, 5 from Ad hoc movements, 2 from Eastern Orthodox Church, 2 from Christian Congregations in Slovakia, 2 from Greek Catholic Church, 2 from Evangelical Church and 1 from Old Catholic Church.

== Facilities ==
The village has a public library and football pitch.

== See also ==
- List of municipalities and towns in Slovakia

== Genealogical resources ==
The records for genealogical research are available at the state archive "Statny Archiv in Nitra, Slovakia"
