= Pohranice =

Pohranice Pográny
- Municipality
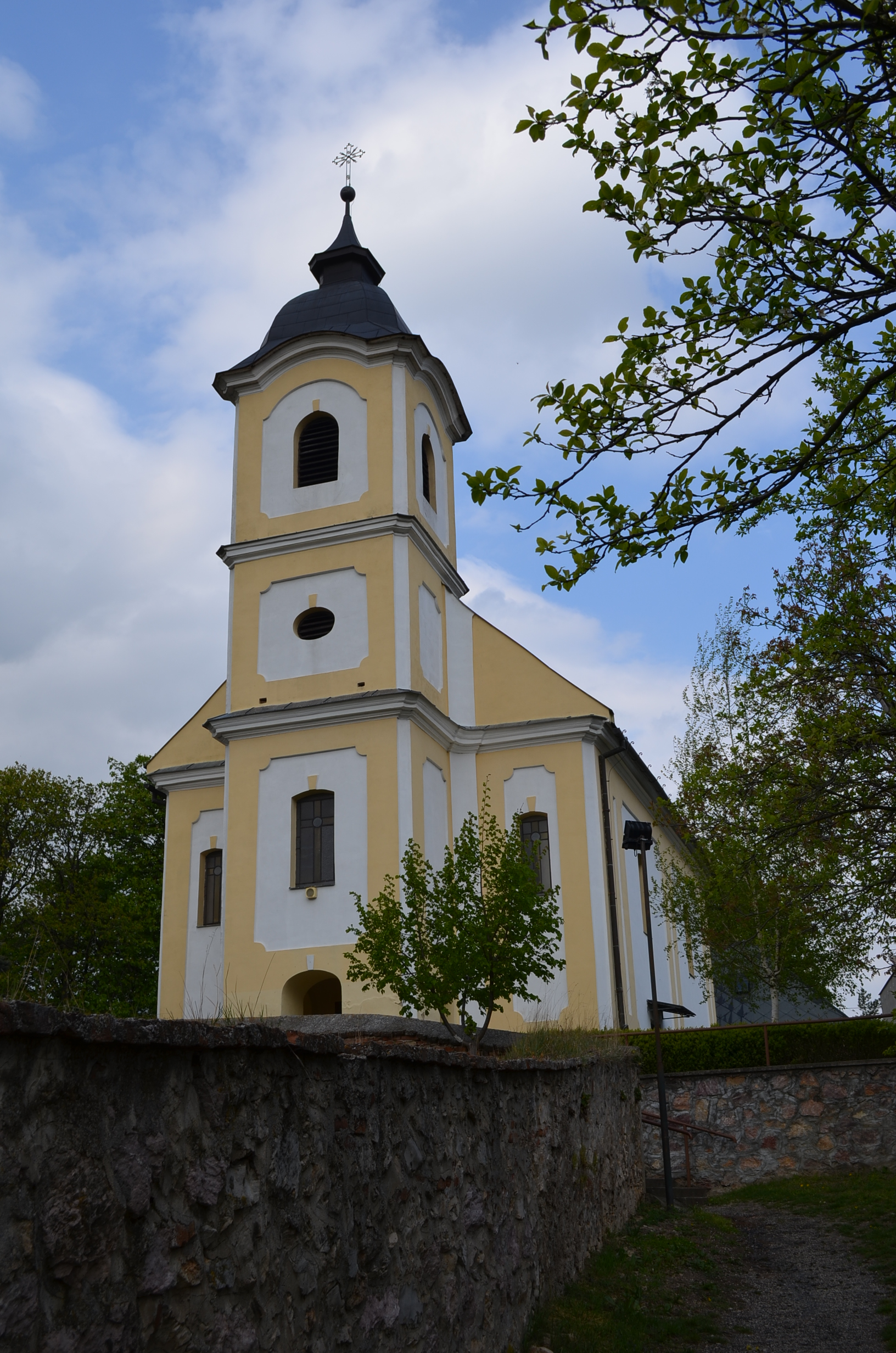

- Flag

- Location of Pohranice in the Nitra Region Location of Pohranice in Slovakia
- Coordinates: 48.33°N 18.18°E
- Country: Slovakia
- Region: Nitra Region
- District: Nitra District
- First mentioned: 1075

Area
  - Total: 12.08 km^{2} (4.66 sq mi)
- Elevation: 189 m (620 ft)

Population (2025)
  - Total: 1,150
- Time zone: UTC+1 (CET)
  - Summer (DST): UTC+2 (CEST)
- Postal code: 951 02
- Area code: +421 37
- Vehicle registration plate (until 2022): NR
- Website: www.pohranice.sk

Pohranice (Hungarian: Pográny) is a village and municipality in the Nitra District in western central Slovakia, in the Nitra Region.

== History ==
In historical records the village was first mentioned in 1075.

== Geography ==
The municipality lies at an altitude of 189 metres (620 ft) and covers an area of 12.08 km^{2} (4.66 sq mi) (2025).

== Population ==
Population statistic (10 years)
Year	1995	2005	2015	2025
Count	1075	1078	1075	1150
Difference		+0.27%	−0.27%	+6.97%

Population statistic
Year	2024	2025
Count	1103	1150
Difference		+4.26%

It has a population of 1150 people (31 December 2025).

=== Ethnicity ===
Census 2021 (1+ %)
Ethnicity	Number	Fraction
Slovak	684	61.51%
Hungarian	449	40.37%
Not found out	42	3.77%
Total	1112	

In year 2021 was 1112 people by ethnicity 684 as Slovak, 449 as Hungarian, 42 as Not found out, 5 as Czech, 4 as Rusyn, 1 as Italian, 1 as Polish, 1 as Other and 1 as Bulgarian.

Note on population: The difference values of population numbers in the table "Population statistic" and in the sections "Ethnicity" & "Religion" is caused by the use of various statistical methods.

=== Religion ===
Census 2021 (1+ %)
Religion	Number	Fraction
Roman Catholic Church	905	81.38%
None	140	12.59%
Not found out	38	3.42%
Total	1112	

In year 2021 was 1112 people by religion 905 from Roman Catholic Church, 140 from None, 38 from Not found out, 10 from Christian Congregations in Slovakia, 6 from Greek Catholic Church, 4 from Other and not ascertained christian church, 4 from Evangelical Church, 2 from Ad hoc movements, 1 from Calvinist Church, 1 from Other and 1 from Buddhism.
