= Tajná =

Tajná Tajnasári
- Municipality
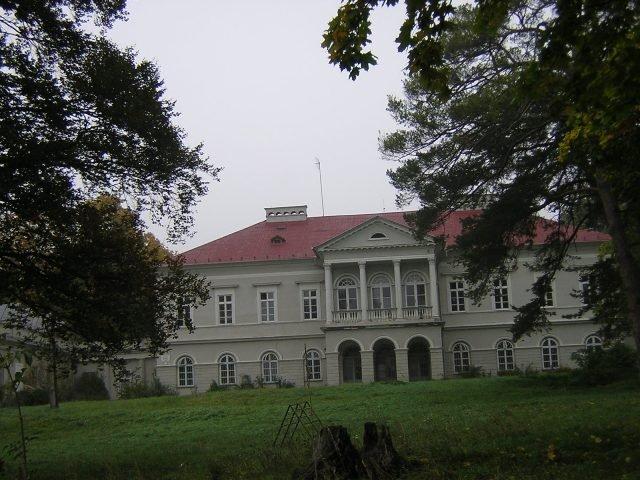
- Révay's manor

- Flag

- Location of Tajná in the Nitra Region Location of Tajná in Slovakia
- Coordinates: 48.27°N 18.37°E
- Country: Slovakia
- Region: Nitra Region
- District: Nitra District
- First mentioned: 1075

Government
  - Mayor: Jozef Füle (Independent)

Area
  - Total: 8.48 km^{2} (3.27 sq mi)
- Elevation: 162 m (531 ft)

Population (2025)
  - Total: 282
- Time zone: UTC+1 (CET)
  - Summer (DST): UTC+2 (CEST)
- Postal code: 952 01
- Area code: +421 37
- Vehicle registration plate (until 2022): NR
- Website: www.tajna.sk

Tajná (Hungarian: Tajnasári) is a village and municipality in the Nitra District in western central Slovakia, in the Nitra Region.

== History ==
In historical records the village was first mentioned in 1075.

== Geography ==
The municipality lies at an altitude of 162 metres (531 ft) and covers an area of 8.48 km^{2} (3.27 sq mi) (2025).

== Population ==
Population statistic (10 years)
Year	1995	2005	2015	2025
Count	277	284	285	282
Difference		+2.52%	+0.35%	−1.05%

Population statistic
Year	2024	2025
Count	281	282
Difference		+0.35%

It has a population of 282 people (31 December 2025).

=== Ethnicity ===
Census 2021 (1+ %)
Ethnicity	Number	Fraction
Slovak	260	94.54%
Not found out	11	4%
Other	3	1.09%
Total	275	

In year 2021 was 275 people by ethnicity 260 as Slovak, 11 as Not found out, 3 as Other, 2 as Russian, 2 as German, 1 as Serbian and 1 as Hungarian.

Note on population: The difference values of population numbers in the table "Population statistic" and in the sections "Ethnicity" & "Religion" is caused by the use of various statistical methods.

=== Religion ===
Census 2021 (1+ %)
Religion	Number	Fraction
Roman Catholic Church	207	75.27%
None	44	16%
Not found out	11	4%
Greek Catholic Church	6	2.18%
Evangelical Church	3	1.09%
Total	275	

In year 2021 was 275 people by religion 207 from Roman Catholic Church, 44 from None, 11 from Not found out, 6 from Greek Catholic Church, 3 from Evangelical Church, 1 from Eastern Orthodox Church, 1 from Christian Congregations in Slovakia, 1 from Other and 1 from Ad hoc movements.
