= Kapince =

Kapince Káp
- Municipality
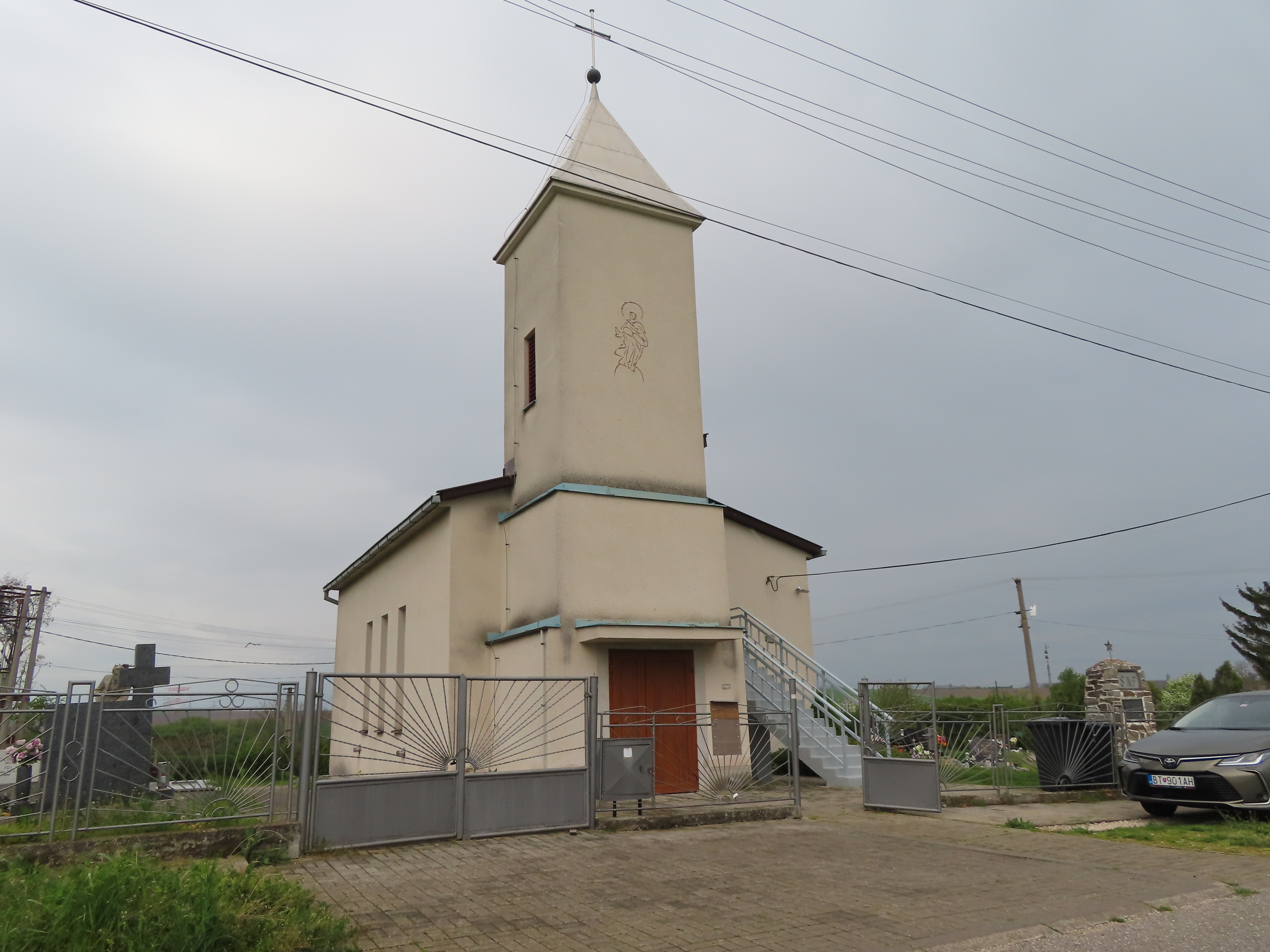

- Flag

- Location of Kapince in the Nitra Region Location of Kapince in Slovakia
- Coordinates: 48.45°N 17.98°E
- Country: Slovakia
- Region: Nitra Region
- District: Nitra District
- First mentioned: 1261

Area
  - Total: 5.83 km^{2} (2.25 sq mi)
- Elevation: 169 m (554 ft)

Population (2025)
  - Total: 169
- Time zone: UTC+1 (CET)
  - Summer (DST): UTC+2 (CEST)
- Postal code: 951 24
- Area code: +421 37
- Vehicle registration plate (until 2022): NR

Kapince (Hungarian: Káp) is a village and municipality in the Nitra District in western central Slovakia, in the Nitra Region.

== History ==
In historical records the village was first mentioned in 1261.

== Geography ==
The municipality lies at an altitude of 169 metres (554 ft) and covers an area of 5.83 km^{2} (2.25 sq mi) (2025).

== Population ==
Population statistic (10 years)
Year	1995	2005	2015	2025
Count	187	196	177	169
Difference		+4.81%	−9.69%	−4.51%

Population statistic
Year	2024	2025
Count	172	169
Difference		−1.74%

It has a population of 169 people (31 December 2025).

=== Ethnicity ===
Census 2021 (1+ %)
Ethnicity	Number	Fraction
Slovak	182	98.91%
Hungarian	2	1.08%
Total	184	

In year 2021 was 184 people by ethnicity 182 as Slovak, 2 as Hungarian, 1 as Rusyn and 1 as English.

Note on population: The difference values of population numbers in the table "Population statistic" and in the sections "Ethnicity" & "Religion" is caused by the use of various statistical methods.

=== Religion ===
Census 2021 (1+ %)
Religion	Number	Fraction
Roman Catholic Church	134	72.83%
None	40	21.74%
Eastern Orthodox Church	3	1.63%
Evangelical Church	3	1.63%
Total	184	

In year 2021 was 184 people by religion 134 from Roman Catholic Church, 40 from None, 3 from Eastern Orthodox Church, 3 from Evangelical Church, 1 from Not found out, 1 from Christian Congregations in Slovakia, 1 from Greek Catholic Church and 1 from Ad hoc movements.

== Facilities ==
The village has a public library and football pitch.

== See also ==
- List of municipalities and towns in Slovakia

== Genealogical resources ==
The records for genealogical research are available at the state archive "Statny Archiv in Bratislava, Nitra, Slovakia"

- Roman Catholic church records (births/marriages/deaths): 1823-1897 (parish B)
