= Malý Lapáš =

Village and municipality in Slovakia

Malý Lapáš Kislapás
- Municipality
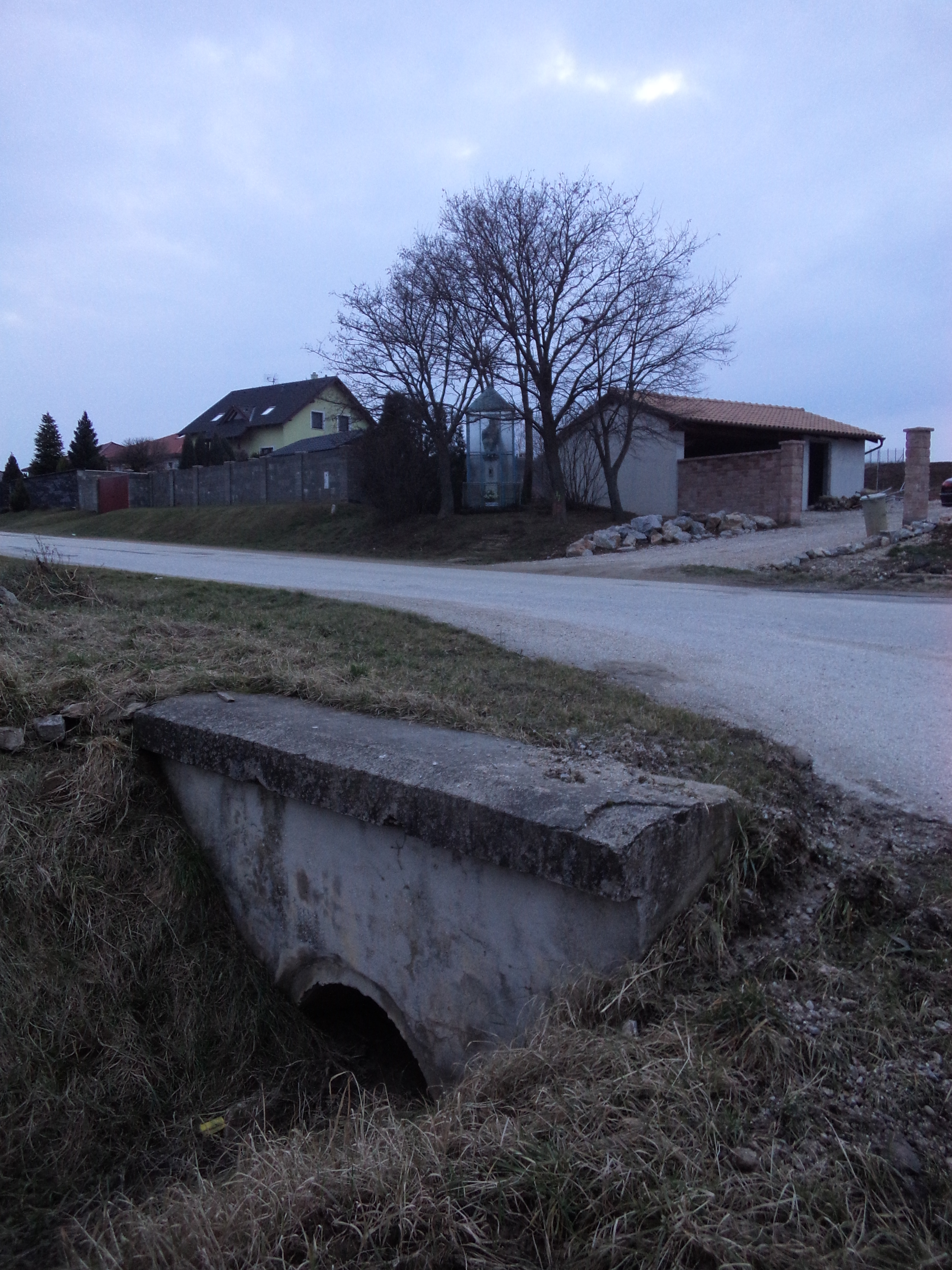

- Flag

- Location of Malý Lapáš in the Nitra Region Location of Malý Lapáš in Slovakia
- Coordinates: 48.30°N 18.18°E
- Country: Slovakia
- Region: Nitra Region
- District: Nitra District
- First mentioned: 1394

Area
  - Total: 3.21 km^{2} (1.24 sq mi)
- Elevation: 176 m (577 ft)

Population (2025)
  - Total: 1,534
- Time zone: UTC+1 (CET)
  - Summer (DST): UTC+2 (CEST)
- Postal code: 951 04
- Area code: +421 37
- Vehicle registration plate (until 2022): NR
- Website: www.malylapas.sk

Malý Lapáš (Hungarian: Kislapás) is a village and municipality in the Nitra District in western central Slovakia, in the Nitra Region.

== History ==
In historical records the village was first mentioned in 1394.

== Geography ==
The municipality lies at an altitude of 176 metres (577 ft) and covers an area of 3.21 km^{2} (1.24 sq mi) (2025).

== Population ==
Population statistic (10 years)
Year	1995	2005	2015	2025
Count	335	412	758	1534
Difference		+22.98%	+83.98%	+102.37%

Population statistic
Year	2024	2025
Count	1514	1534
Difference		+1.32%

It has a population of 1534 people (31 December 2025).

=== Ethnicity ===
Census 2021 (1+ %)
Ethnicity	Number	Fraction
Slovak	1175	97.42%
Not found out	18	1.49%
Hungarian	16	1.32%
Total	1206	

In year 2021 was 1206 people by ethnicity 1175 as Slovak, 18 as Not found out, 16 as Hungarian, 10 as Czech, 5 as Russian, 2 as Rusyn, 2 as Other, 1 as Ukrainian, 1 as Serbian and 1 as Polish.

Note on population: The difference values of population numbers in the table "Population statistic" and in the sections "Ethnicity" & "Religion" is caused by the use of various statistical methods.

=== Religion ===
Census 2021 (1+ %)
Religion	Number	Fraction
Roman Catholic Church	859	71.23%
None	264	21.89%
Evangelical Church	19	1.58%
Christian Congregations in Slovakia	17	1.41%
Not found out	15	1.24%
Total	1206	

In year 2021 was 1206 people by religion 859 from Roman Catholic Church, 264 from None, 19 from Evangelical Church, 17 from Christian Congregations in Slovakia, 15 from Not found out, 7 from Eastern Orthodox Church, 7 from Greek Catholic Church, 5 from Jehovah's Witnesses, 4 from Apostolic Church, 3 from Ad hoc movements, 2 from Old Catholic Church, 1 from Calvinist Church, 1 from Paganism and natural spirituality, 1 from Other and not ascertained christian church and 1 from Other.

== Facilities ==
The village has a public library.
