= Poľný Kesov =

- Municipality
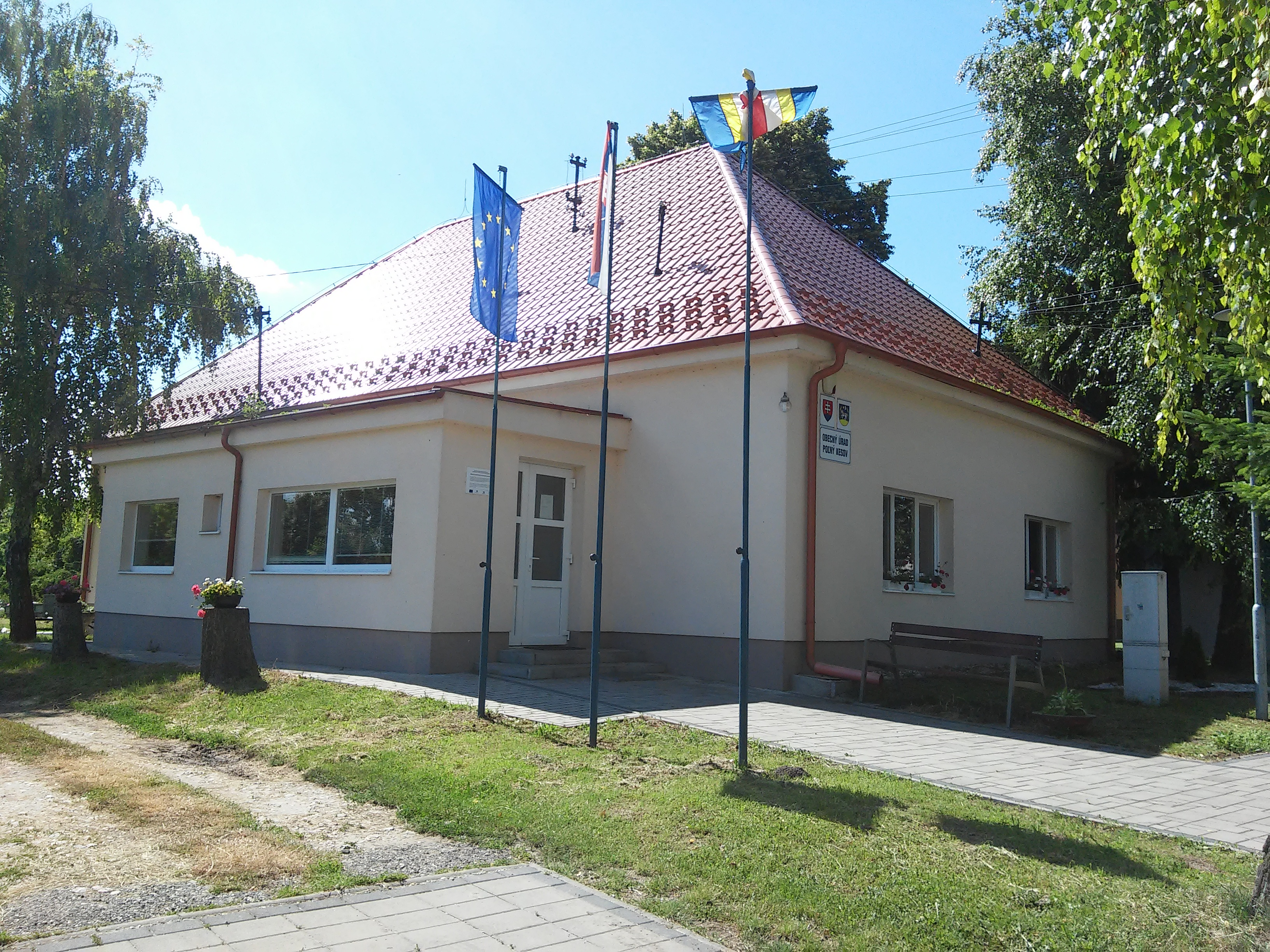
- Municipal Office

- Flag

- Location of Poľný Kesov in the Nitra Region Location of Poľný Kesov in Slovakia
- Coordinates: 48.17°N 18.07°E
- Country: Slovakia
- Region: Nitra Region
- District: Nitra District
- First mentioned: 1113

Area
  - Total: 10.22 km^{2} (3.95 sq mi)
- Elevation: 126 m (413 ft)

Population (2025)
  - Total: 635
- Time zone: UTC+1 (CET)
  - Summer (DST): UTC+2 (CEST)
- Postal code: 951 14
- Area code: +421 37
- Vehicle registration plate (until 2022): NR
- Website: www.polnykesov.eu

Poľný Kesov (Hungarian: Mezőkeszi) is a village and municipality in the Nitra District in western central Slovakia, in the Nitra Region.

== History ==
In historical records the village was first mentioned in 1113.

== Geography ==
The municipality lies at an altitude of 126 metres (413 ft) and covers an area of 10.22 km^{2} (3.95 sq mi) (2025).

== Population ==
Population statistic (10 years)
| Year | 1995 | 2005 | 2015 | 2025 |
|---|---|---|---|---|
| Count | 592 | 625 | 642 | 635 |
| Difference | | +5.57% | +2.72% | −1.09% |

Population statistic
| Year | 2024 | 2025 |
|---|---|---|
| Count | 632 | 635 |
| Difference | | +0.47% |

It has a population of 635 people (31 December 2025).

=== Ethnicity ===
Census 2021 (1+ %)
| Ethnicity | Number | Fraction |
|---|---|---|
| Slovak | 613 | 93.73% |
| Not found out | 37 | 5.65% |
| Czech | 7 | 1.07% |
| Total | 654 | |

In year 2021 was 654 people by ethnicity 613 as Slovak, 37 as Not found out, 7 as Czech, 3 as Hungarian, 3 as Other, 2 as Russian, 1 as Polish and 1 as Bulgarian.

Note on population: The difference values of population numbers in the table "Population statistic" and in the sections "Ethnicity" & "Religion" is caused by the use of various statistical methods.

=== Religion ===
Census 2021 (1+ %)
| Religion | Number | Fraction |
|---|---|---|
| Roman Catholic Church | 439 | 67.13% |
| None | 157 | 24.01% |
| Not found out | 35 | 5.35% |
| Evangelical Church | 13 | 1.99% |
| Total | 654 | |

In year 2021 was 654 people by religion 439 from Roman Catholic Church, 157 from None, 35 from Not found out, 13 from Evangelical Church, 3 from Greek Catholic Church, 2 from Ad hoc movements, 1 from Jewish community, 1 from Eastern Orthodox Church, 1 from Christian Congregations in Slovakia, 1 from Islam and 1 from United Methodist Church.
