= Melek, Nitra District =

Melek Mellek
- Municipality
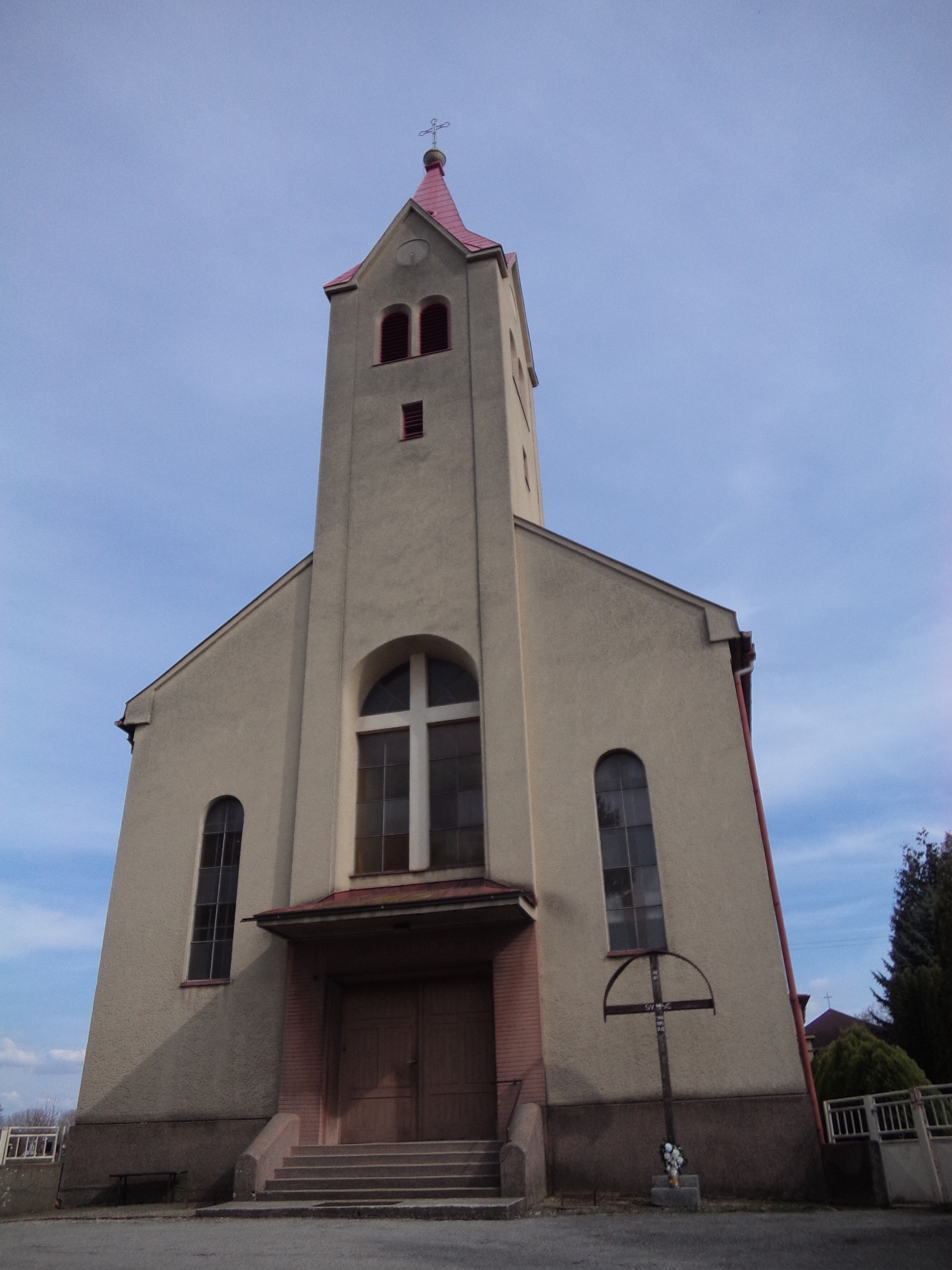

- Flag

- Location of Melek in the Nitra Region Location of Melek in Slovakia
- Coordinates: 48°12′N 18°20′E
- Country: Slovakia
- Region: Nitra Region
- District: Nitra District
- First mentioned: 1332

Area
  - Total: 6.19 km^{2} (2.39 sq mi)
- Elevation: 165 m (541 ft)

Population (2025)
  - Total: 564
- Time zone: UTC+1 (CET)
  - Summer (DST): UTC+2 (CEST)
- Postal code: 952 01
- Area code: +421 37
- Vehicle registration plate (until 2022): NR
- Website: www.melek.sk

Melek (Hungarian: Mellek) is a municipality and village in the Nitra District of the south-west of Slovakia, in the Nitra Region.

== Population ==
Population statistic (10 years)
Year	1995	2005	2015	2025
Count	440	451	452	564
Difference		+2.5%	+0.22%	+24.77%

Population statistic
Year	2024	2025
Count	562	564
Difference		+0.35%

It has a population of 564 people (31 December 2025).

=== Ethnicity ===
Census 2021 (1+ %)
Ethnicity	Number	Fraction
Slovak	463	93.15%
Not found out	31	6.23%
Ukrainian	6	1.2%
Total	497	

In year 2021 was 497 people by ethnicity 463 as Slovak, 31 as Not found out, 6 as Ukrainian, 1 as Czech, 1 as Romani and 1 as Other.

Note on population: The difference values of population numbers in the table "Population statistic" and in the sections "Ethnicity" & "Religion" is caused by the use of various statistical methods.

=== Religion ===
Census 2021 (1+ %)
Religion	Number	Fraction
Roman Catholic Church	384	77.26%
None	73	14.69%
Not found out	27	5.43%
Total	497	

In year 2021 was 497 people by religion 384 from Roman Catholic Church, 73 from None, 27 from Not found out, 4 from Greek Catholic Church, 3 from Eastern Orthodox Church, 2 from Other, 2 from Evangelical Church, 1 from Christian Congregations in Slovakia and 1 from Ad hoc movements.
