= Čechynce =

Village and municipality in Slovakia

Čechynce Nyitracsehi
- Municipality
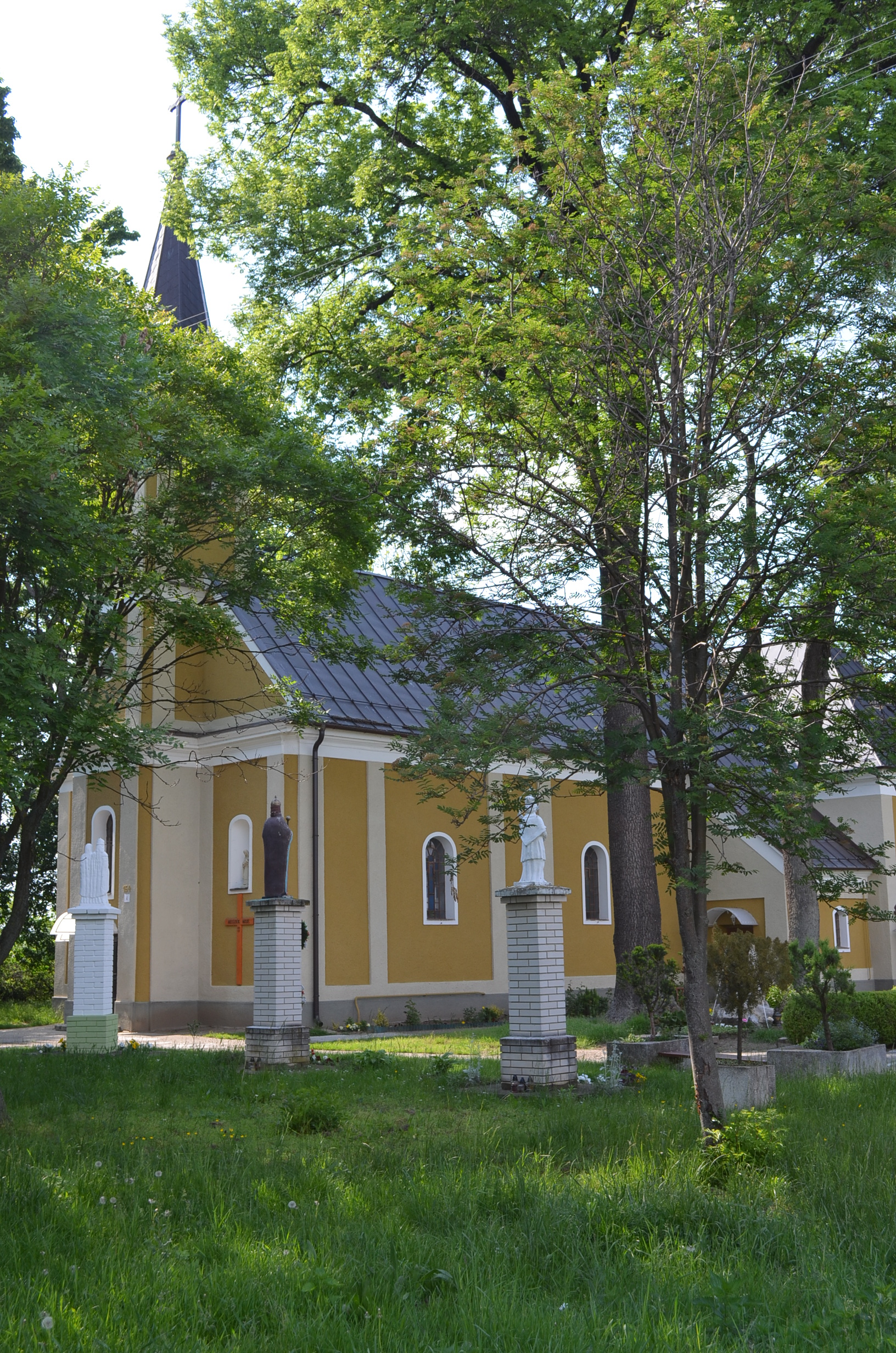

- Flag

- Location of Čechynce in the Nitra Region Location of Čechynce in Slovakia
- Coordinates: 48.25°N 18.17°E
- Country: Slovakia
- Region: Nitra Region
- District: Nitra District
- First mentioned: 1248

Area
  - Total: 5.86 km^{2} (2.26 sq mi)
- Elevation: 133 m (436 ft)

Population (2025)
  - Total: 1,287
- Time zone: UTC+1 (CET)
  - Summer (DST): UTC+2 (CEST)
- Postal code: 951 07
- Area code: +421 37
- Vehicle registration plate (until 2022): NR
- Website: www.cechynce.eu

Čechynce (Hungarian: Nyitracsehi) is a village and municipality in the Nitra District in western central Slovakia, in the Nitra Region.

== History ==
In historical records the village was first mentioned in 1248.

== Geography ==
The municipality lies at an altitude of 133 metres (436 ft) and covers an area of 5.86 km^{2} (2.26 sq mi) (2025).

== Population ==
Population statistic (10 years)
Year	1995	2005	2015	2025
Count	1020	1018	1124	1287
Difference		−0.19%	+10.41%	+14.50%

Population statistic
Year	2024	2025
Count	1273	1287
Difference		+1.09%

It has a population of 1287 people (31 December 2025).

=== Ethnicity ===
Census 2021 (1+ %)
Ethnicity	Number	Fraction
Slovak	877	69.88%
Hungarian	435	34.66%
Not found out	17	1.35%
Total	1255	

In year 2021 was 1255 people by ethnicity 877 as Slovak, 435 as Hungarian, 17 as Not found out, 3 as German, 1 as Czech and 1 as English.

Note on population: The difference values of population numbers in the table "Population statistic" and in the sections "Ethnicity" & "Religion" is caused by the use of various statistical methods.

=== Religion ===
Census 2021 (1+ %)
Religion	Number	Fraction
Roman Catholic Church	1009	80.4%
None	198	15.78%
Not found out	13	1.04%
Total	1255	

In year 2021 was 1255 people by religion 1009 from Roman Catholic Church, 198 from None, 13 from Not found out, 12 from Evangelical Church, 8 from Greek Catholic Church, 4 from Other, 3 from Christian Congregations in Slovakia, 2 from Paganism and natural spirituality, 2 from Jehovah's Witnesses, 1 from Calvinist Church, 1 from Other and not ascertained christian church, 1 from Buddhism and 1 from Ad hoc movements.

== Facilities ==
The village has a public library and football pitch.

== Genealogical resources ==
The records for genealogical research are available at the state archive "Statny Archiv in Nitra, Slovakia"

- Roman Catholic church records (births/marriages/deaths): 1701-1902 (parish B)
- Lutheran church records (births/marriages/deaths): 1887-1954 (parish B)

== See also ==
- List of municipalities and towns in Slovakia
