= Bádice =

Village and municipality in Slovakia

Bádice Béd
- Municipality
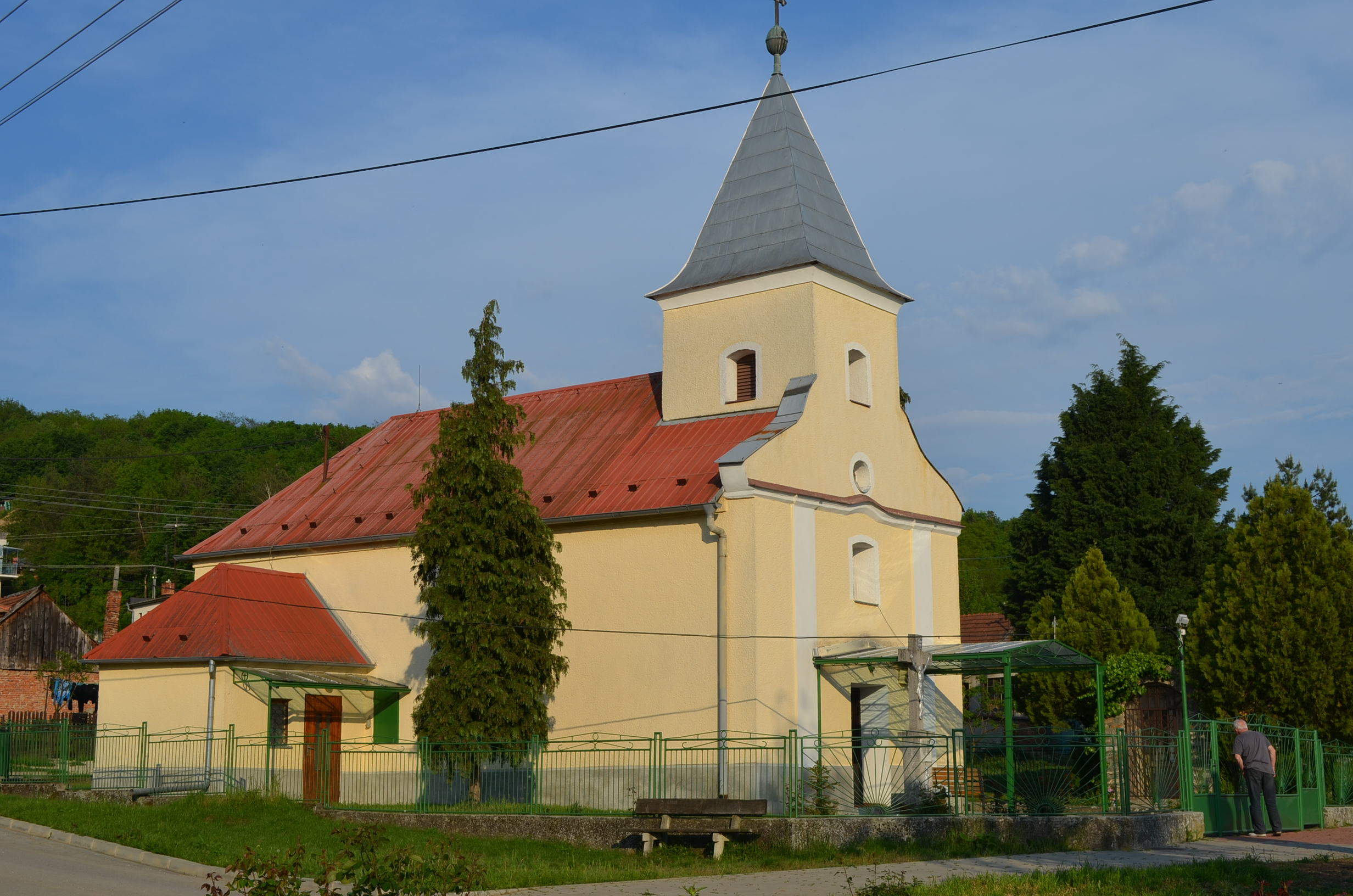

- Flag

- Location of Bádice in the Nitra Region Location of Bádice in Slovakia
- Coordinates: 48.40°N 18.13°E
- Country: Slovakia
- Region: Nitra Region
- District: Nitra District
- First mentioned: 1291

Area
  - Total: 0.00 km^{2} (0 sq mi)
- Elevation: 187 m (614 ft)

Population (2025)
  - Total: 399
- Time zone: UTC+1 (CET)
  - Summer (DST): UTC+2 (CEST)
- Postal code: 951 46
- Area code: +421 37
- Vehicle registration plate (until 2022): NR
- Website: www.badice.sk

Bádice (Hungarian: Béd) is a village and municipality in the Nitra District in western central Slovakia, in the Nitra Region.

== Geography ==
The municipality lies at an altitude of 187 metres (614 ft) and covers an area of 0.00 km^{2} (0 sq mi) (2025).

== Population ==
Population statistic (10 years)
Year	1995	2005	2015	2025
Count	0	334	321	399
Difference		–	−3.89%	+24.29%

Population statistic
Year	2024	2025
Count	399	399
Difference		+0%

It has a population of 399 people (31 December 2025).

=== Ethnicity ===
Census 2021 (1+ %)
Ethnicity	Number	Fraction
Slovak	369	94.61%
Hungarian	12	3.07%
Not found out	9	2.3%
Czech	6	1.53%
Total	390	

In year 2021 was 390 people by ethnicity 369 as Slovak, 12 as Hungarian, 9 as Not found out, 6 as Czech, 3 as Serbian, 1 as Vietnamese, 1 as Silesian, 1 as Romanian, 1 as Austrian, 1 as Polish, 1 as Moravian and 1 as Greek.

Note on population: The difference values of population numbers in the table "Population statistic" and in the sections "Ethnicity" & "Religion" is caused by the use of various statistical methods.

=== Religion ===
Census 2021 (1+ %)
Religion	Number	Fraction
Roman Catholic Church	260	66.67%
None	100	25.64%
Not found out	11	2.82%
Christian Congregations in Slovakia	5	1.28%
Evangelical Church	5	1.28%
Jehovah's Witnesses	4	1.03%
Total	390	

In year 2021 was 390 people by religion 260 from Roman Catholic Church, 100 from None, 11 from Not found out, 5 from Christian Congregations in Slovakia, 5 from Evangelical Church, 4 from Jehovah's Witnesses, 2 from Other, 2 from Ad hoc movements and 1 from Greek Catholic Church.

== Genealogical resources ==
The records for genealogical research are available at the state archive in Nitra (Slovak: Štátny archív v Nitre).

- Roman Catholic church records (births/marriages/deaths): 1696-1895
- Census records 1869 of Badice are not available at the state archive.

== See also ==
- List of municipalities and towns in Slovakia
