= Malé Zálužie =

Village and municipality in Slovakia

Malé Zálužie Újlacska
- Municipality
- Flag

- Location of Malé Zálužie in the Nitra Region Location of Malé Zálužie in Slovakia
- Coordinates: 48.43°N 17.98°E
- Country: Slovakia
- Region: Nitra Region
- District: Nitra District
- First mentioned: 1390

Area
  - Total: 5.90 km^{2} (2.28 sq mi)
- Elevation: 160 m (520 ft)

Population (2025)
  - Total: 272
- Time zone: UTC+1 (CET)
  - Summer (DST): UTC+2 (CEST)
- Postal code: 951 24
- Area code: +421 37
- Vehicle registration plate (until 2022): NR
- Website: www.malezaluzie.sk

Malé Zálužie (Hungarian: Újlacska) is a village and municipality in the Nitra District in western central Slovakia, in the Nitra Region.

== History ==
In historical records the village was first mentioned in 1390.

== Geography ==
The municipality lies at an altitude of 160 metres (520 ft) and covers an area of 5.90 km^{2} (2.28 sq mi) (2025).

== Population ==
Population statistic (10 years)
Year	1995	2005	2015	2025
Count	289	252	275	272
Difference		−12.80%	+9.12%	−1.09%

Population statistic
Year	2024	2025
Count	285	272
Difference		−4.56%

It has a population of 272 people (31 December 2025).

=== Ethnicity ===
Census 2021 (1+ %)
Ethnicity	Number	Fraction
Slovak	252	94.73%
Not found out	15	5.63%
Total	266	

In year 2021 was 266 people by ethnicity 252 as Slovak, 15 as Not found out, 1 as Polish and 1 as Other.

Note on population: The difference values of population numbers in the table "Population statistic" and in the sections "Ethnicity" & "Religion" is caused by the use of various statistical methods.

=== Religion ===
Census 2021 (1+ %)
Religion	Number	Fraction
Evangelical Church	106	39.85%
Roman Catholic Church	105	39.47%
None	37	13.91%
Not found out	13	4.89%
Other and not ascertained christian church	3	1.13%
Total	266	

In year 2021 was 266 people by religion 106 from Evangelical Church, 105 from Roman Catholic Church, 37 from None, 13 from Not found out, 3 from Other and not ascertained christian church, 1 from Old Catholic Church and 1 from Apostolic Church.

== Facilities ==
The village has a public library and also a gym, football pitch and table tennis tables.
