= Veľké Chyndice =

Village and municipality in Slovakia

Veľké Chyndice Nagyhind
- Municipality
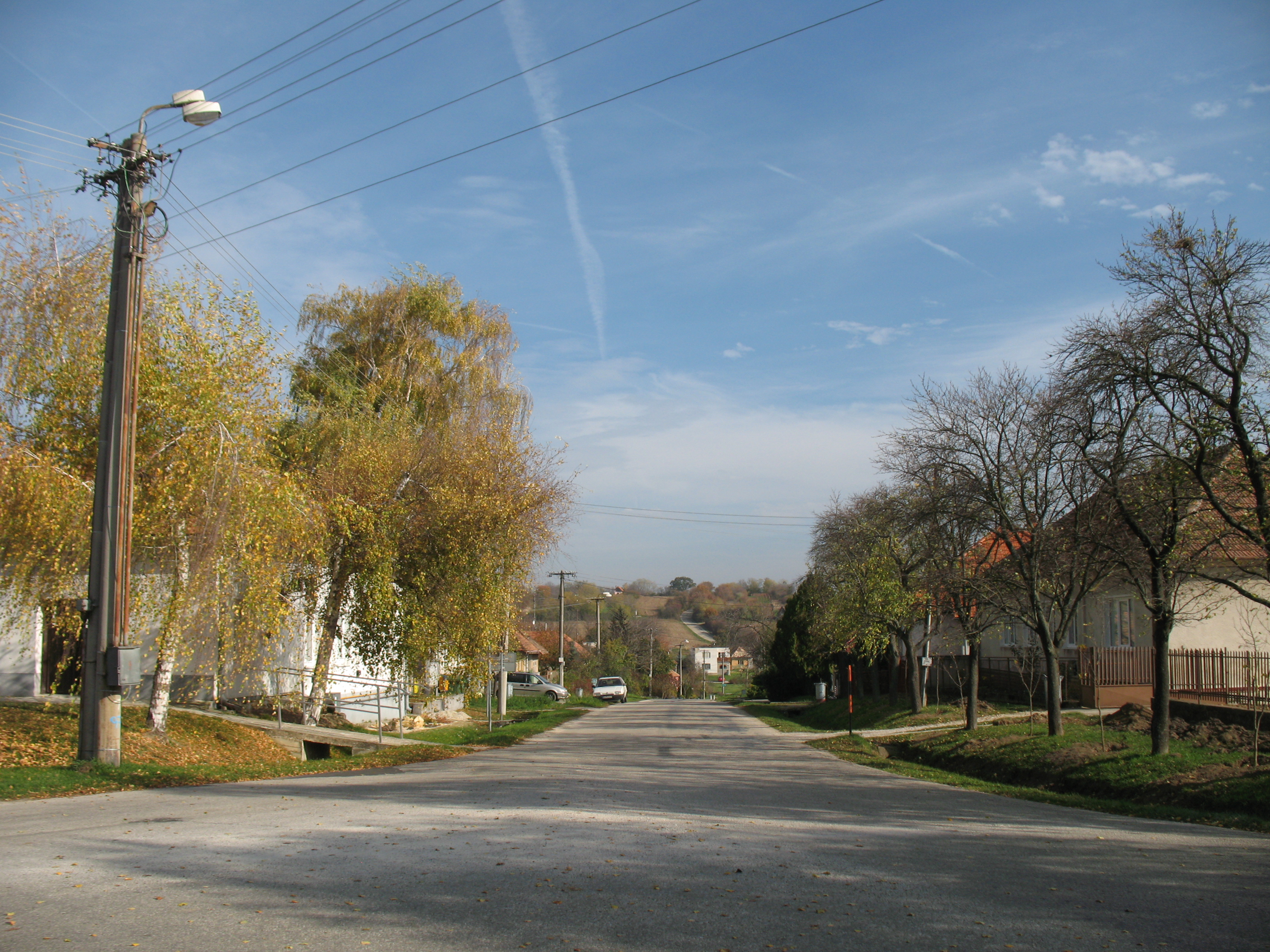

- Flag

- Location of Veľké Chyndice in the Nitra Region Location of Veľké Chyndice in Slovakia
- Coordinates: 48.28°N 18.30°E
- Country: Slovakia
- Region: Nitra Region
- District: Nitra District
- First mentioned: 1234

Area
  - Total: 5.04 km^{2} (1.95 sq mi)
- Elevation: 174 m (571 ft)

Population (2025)
  - Total: 341
- Time zone: UTC+1 (CET)
  - Summer (DST): UTC+2 (CEST)
- Postal code: 951 54
- Area code: +421 37
- Vehicle registration plate (until 2022): NR
- Website: www.velkechyndice.eu

Veľké Chyndice (Hungarian: Nagyhind) is a village and municipality in the Nitra District of western central Slovakia, in the Nitra Region.

== History ==
The village and municipality is a new settlement established in 1234.

== Geography ==
The municipality lies at an altitude of 174 metres (571 ft) and covers an area of 5.04 km^{2} (1.95 sq mi) (2025).

== Population ==
Population statistic (10 years)
Year	1995	2005	2015	2025
Count	368	332	310	341
Difference		−9.78%	−6.62%	+10%

Population statistic
Year	2024	2025
Count	339	341
Difference		+0.58%

It has a population of 341 people (31 December 2025).

=== Ethnicity ===
Census 2021 (1+ %)
Ethnicity	Number	Fraction
Slovak	300	88.75%
Hungarian	39	11.53%
Not found out	12	3.55%
Total	338	

In year 2021 was 338 people by ethnicity 300 as Slovak, 39 as Hungarian, 12 as Not found out and 2 as Other.

Note on population: The difference values of population numbers in the table "Population statistic" and in the sections "Ethnicity" & "Religion" is caused by the use of various statistical methods.

=== Religion ===
Census 2021 (1+ %)
Religion	Number	Fraction
Roman Catholic Church	270	79.88%
None	37	10.95%
Not found out	14	4.14%
Other and not ascertained christian church	4	1.18%
Jehovah's Witnesses	4	1.18%
Greek Catholic Church	4	1.18%
Total	338	

In year 2021 was 338 people by religion 270 from Roman Catholic Church, 37 from None, 14 from Not found out, 4 from Other and not ascertained christian church, 4 from Jehovah's Witnesses, 4 from Greek Catholic Church, 3 from Christian Congregations in Slovakia and 2 from Evangelical Church.
