= Veľká Dolina =

Veľká Dolina Nagyvölgy
- Municipality
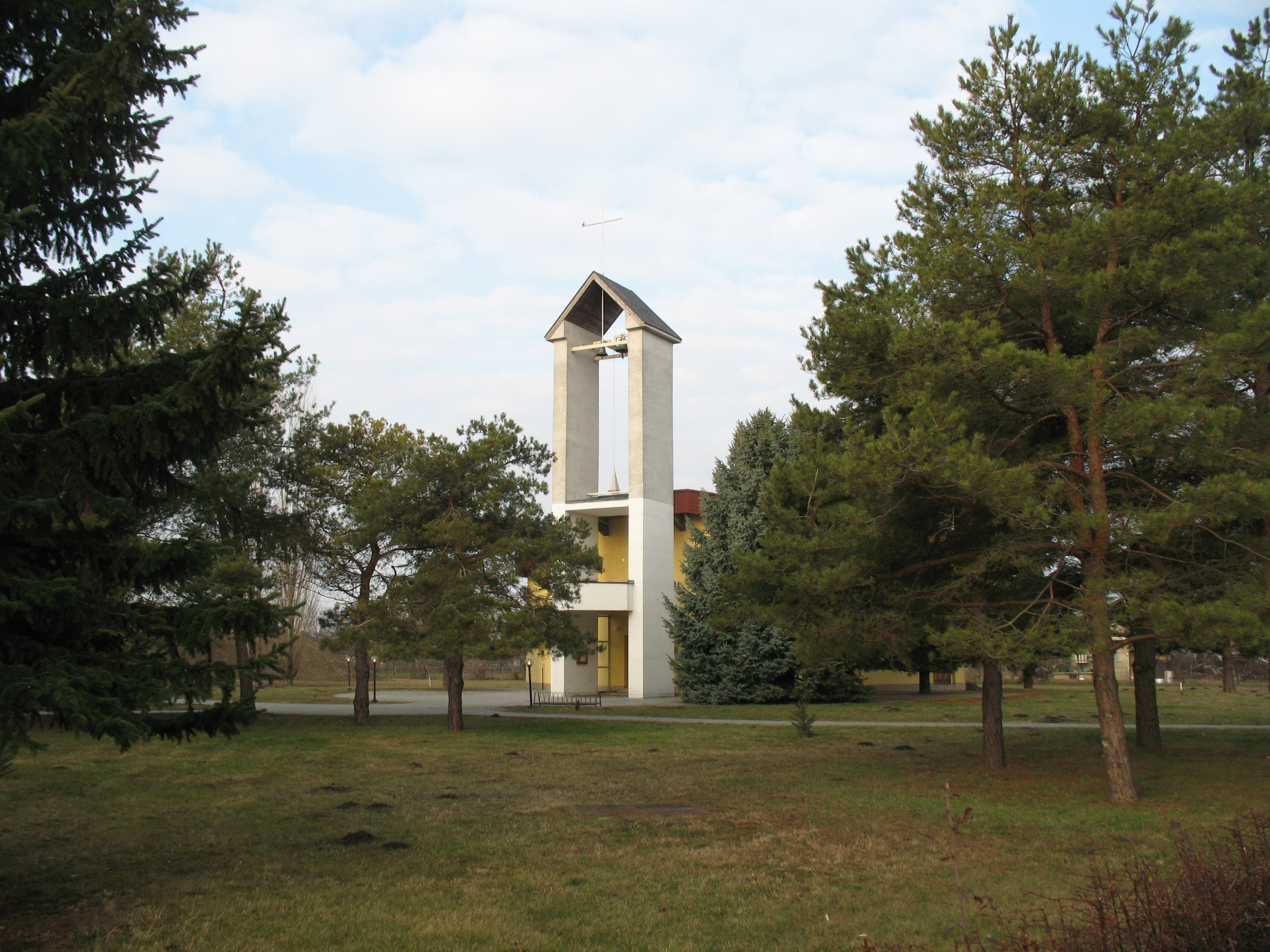

- Flag

- Location of Veľká Dolina in the Nitra Region Location of Veľká Dolina in Slovakia
- Coordinates: 48.19°N 18.03°E
- Country: Slovakia
- Region: Nitra Region
- District: Nitra District
- First mentioned: 1956

Area
  - Total: 11.68 km^{2} (4.51 sq mi)
- Elevation: 136 m (446 ft)

Population (2025)
  - Total: 719
- Time zone: UTC+1 (CET)
  - Summer (DST): UTC+2 (CEST)
- Postal code: 951 15
- Area code: +421 37
- Vehicle registration plate (until 2022): NR
- Website: www.velkadolina.sk

Veľká Dolina (Hungarian: Nagyvölgy) is a village and municipality in the Nitra District of western central Slovakia, in the Nitra Region.

== History ==
The village and municipality is a new settlement established in 1956.

== Geography ==
The municipality lies at an altitude of 136 metres (446 ft) and covers an area of 11.68 km^{2} (4.51 sq mi) (2025).

== Population ==
Population statistic (10 years)
Year	1995	2005	2015	2025
Count	565	617	664	719
Difference		+9.20%	+7.61%	+8.28%

Population statistic
Year	2024	2025
Count	718	719
Difference		+0.13%

It has a population of 719 people (31 December 2025).

=== Ethnicity ===
Census 2021 (1+ %)
Ethnicity	Number	Fraction
Slovak	646	94.58%
Not found out	39	5.71%
Total	683	

In year 2021 was 683 people by ethnicity 646 as Slovak, 39 as Not found out, 4 as Hungarian, 3 as Czech, 2 as Other, 1 as Vietnamese, 1 as Russian and 1 as Polish.

Note on population: The difference values of population numbers in the table "Population statistic" and in the sections "Ethnicity" & "Religion" is caused by the use of various statistical methods.

=== Religion ===
Census 2021 (1+ %)
Religion	Number	Fraction
Roman Catholic Church	377	55.2%
None	246	36.02%
Not found out	34	4.98%
Evangelical Church	12	1.76%
Greek Catholic Church	7	1.02%
Total	683	

In year 2021 was 683 people by religion 377 from Roman Catholic Church, 246 from None, 34 from Not found out, 12 from Evangelical Church, 7 from Greek Catholic Church, 3 from Ad hoc movements, 2 from Christian Congregations in Slovakia, 1 from Other and 1 from United Methodist Church.
