= Podhorany, Nitra District =

Podhorany Nitra District Menyhebédszalakusz
- Municipality
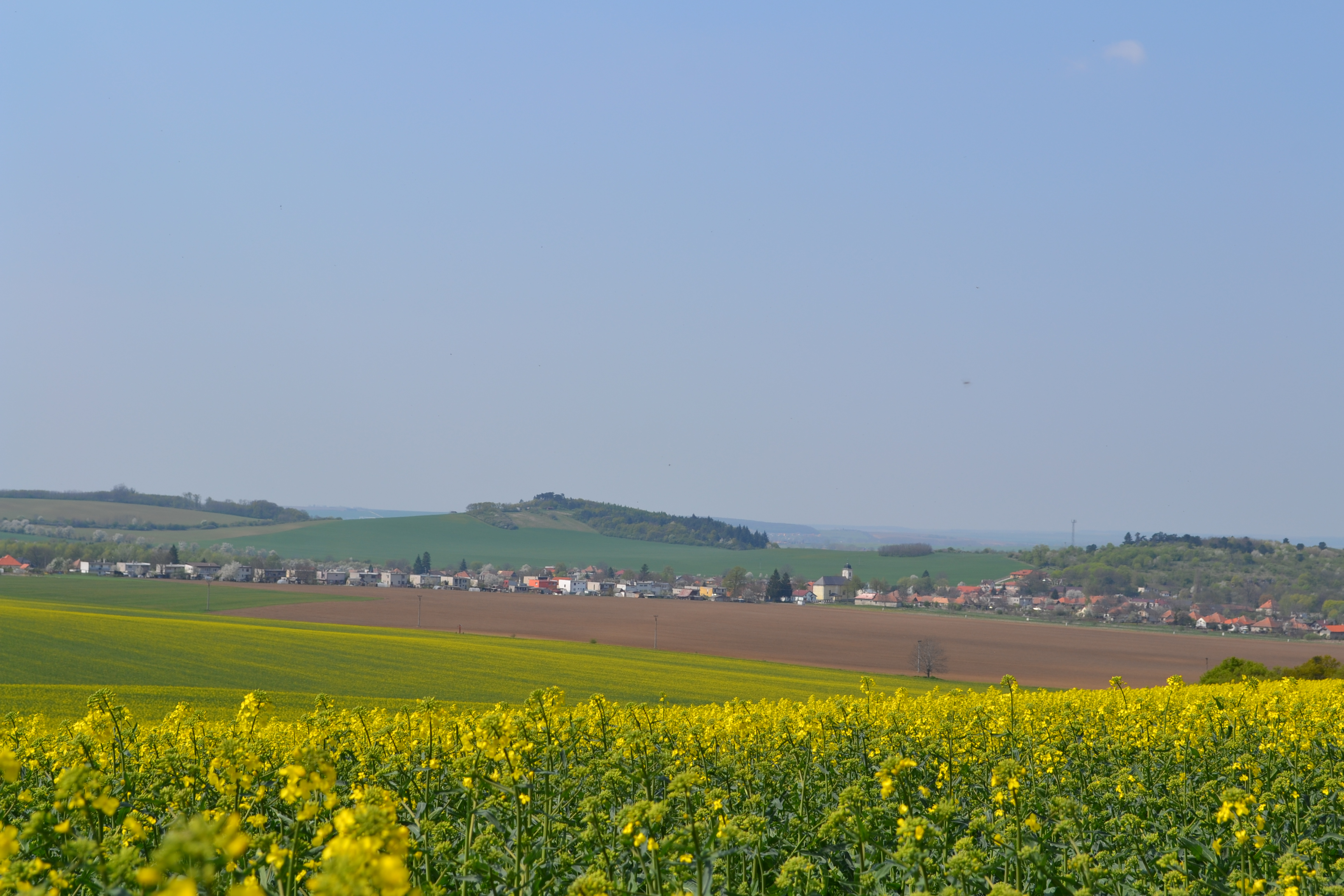

- Flag

- Location of Podhorany Nitra District in the Nitra Region Location of Podhorany Nitra District in Slovakia
- Coordinates: 48°23′02″N 18°06′45″E
- Country: Slovakia
- Region: Nitra Region
- District: Nitra District
- First mentioned: 1113

Area
  - Total: 21.81 km^{2} (8.42 sq mi)
- Elevation: 175 m (574 ft)

Population (2025)
  - Total: 1,154
- Time zone: UTC+1 (CET)
  - Summer (DST): UTC+2 (CEST)
- Postal code: 951 46
- Area code: +421 37
- Vehicle registration plate (until 2022): NR
- Website: www.podhorany.sk

Podhorany (Hungarian: Menyhebédszalakusz) is a village and municipality in the Nitra District in western central Slovakia, in the Nitra Region.

== History ==
In historical records the village was first mentioned in 1113.

== Geography ==
The municipality lies at an altitude of 175 metres (574 ft) and covers an area of 21.81 km^{2} (8.42 sq mi) (2025).

== Population ==
Population statistic (10 years)
Year	1995	2005	2015	2025
Count	1388	1076	1087	1154
Difference		−22.47%	+1.02%	+6.16%

Population statistic
Year	2024	2025
Count	1154	1154
Difference		+1.42%

It has a population of 1154 people (31 December 2025).

=== Ethnicity ===
Census 2021 (1+ %)
Ethnicity	Number	Fraction
Slovak	1047	96.49%
Hungarian	47	4.33%
Not found out	15	1.38%
Total	1085	

In year 2021 was 1085 people by ethnicity 1047 as Slovak, 47 as Hungarian, 15 as Not found out, 3 as Czech, 3 as Serbian, 2 as Romanian, 2 as French, 1 as Italian and 1 as Moravian.

Note on population: The difference values of population numbers in the table "Population statistic" and in the sections "Ethnicity" & "Religion" is caused by the use of various statistical methods.

=== Religion ===
Census 2021 (1+ %)
Religion	Number	Fraction
Roman Catholic Church	814	75.02%
None	206	18.99%
Not found out	13	1.2%
Total	1085	

In year 2021 was 1085 people by religion 814 from Roman Catholic Church, 206 from None, 13 from Not found out, 10 from Greek Catholic Church, 10 from Evangelical Church, 8 from Other, 6 from Calvinist Church, 4 from Other and not ascertained christian church, 3 from Jehovah's Witnesses, 3 from Ad hoc movements, 2 from Eastern Orthodox Church, 2 from Buddhism, 1 from Paganism and natural spirituality, 1 from Christian Congregations in Slovakia, 1 from Islam and 1 from Baptists Church.
