= Čeľadice =

Village and municipality in Slovakia

Čeľadice Család
- Municipality
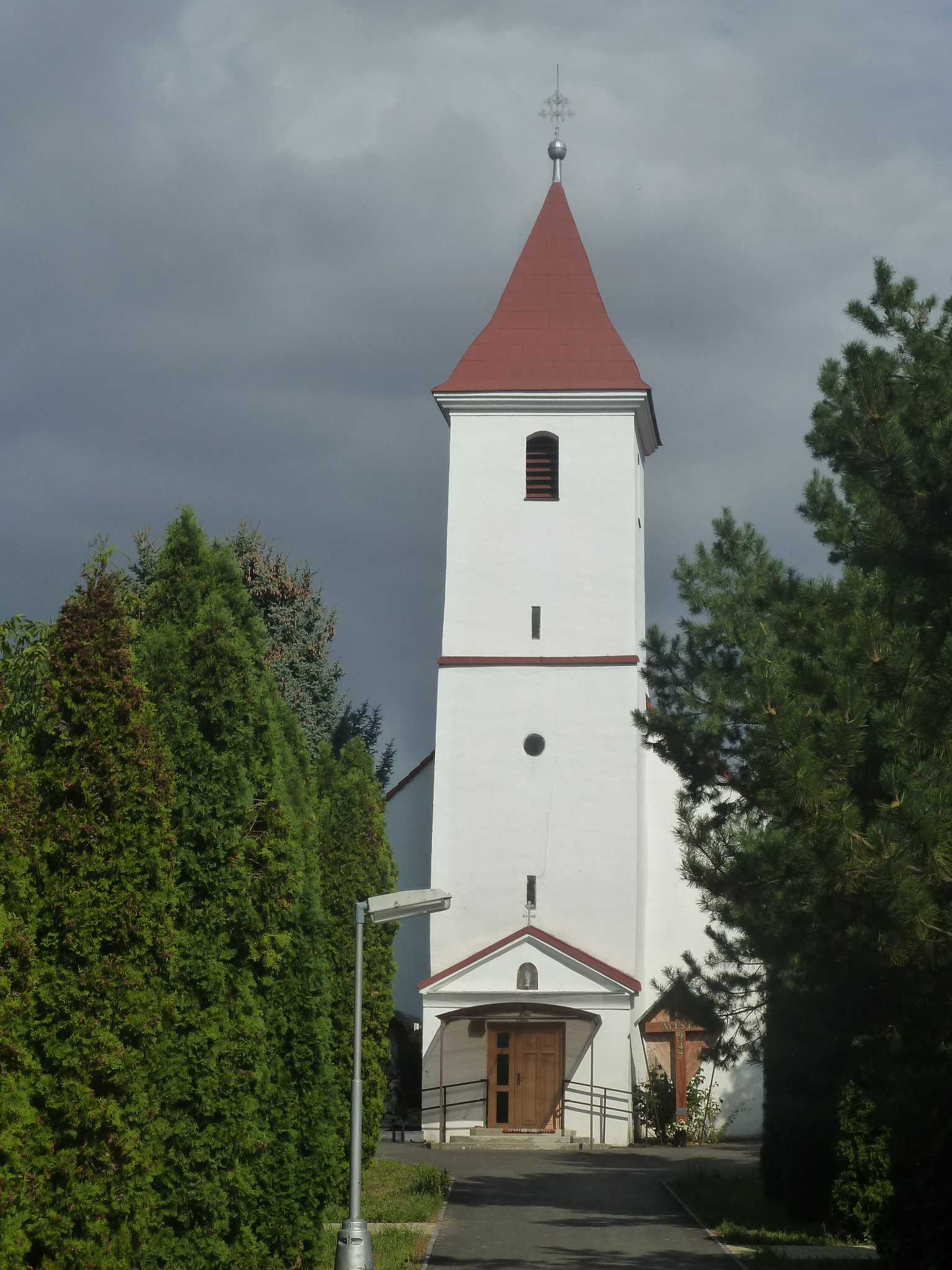
- Church of Saint Catherine of Alexandria in Čeľadice

- Flag

- Location of Čeľadice in the Nitra Region Location of Čeľadice in Slovakia
- Coordinates: 48.33°N 18.25°E
- Country: Slovakia
- Region: Nitra Region
- District: Nitra District
- First mentioned: 1113

Area
  - Total: 10.47 km^{2} (4.04 sq mi)
- Elevation: 180 m (590 ft)

Population (2025)
  - Total: 1,117
- Time zone: UTC+1 (CET)
  - Summer (DST): UTC+2 (CEST)
- Postal code: 951 03
- Area code: +421 37
- Vehicle registration plate (until 2022): NR
- Website: www.celadice.sk

Čeľadice (Hungarian: Család) is a village and municipality in the Nitra District in western central Slovakia, in the Nitra Region.

== History ==
In historical records the village was first mentioned in 1113.

== Geography ==
The municipality lies at an altitude of 180 metres (590 ft) and covers an area of 10.47 km^{2} (4.04 sq mi) (2025).

== Population ==
Population statistic (10 years)
Year	1995	2005	2015	2025
Count	775	769	953	1117
Difference		−0.77%	+23.92%	+17.20%

Population statistic
Year	2024	2025
Count	1109	1117
Difference		+0.72%

It has a population of 1117 people (31 December 2025).

=== Ethnicity ===
Census 2021 (1+ %)
Ethnicity	Number	Fraction
Slovak	1034	95.91%
Not found out	24	2.22%
Hungarian	14	1.29%
Total	1078	

In year 2021 was 1078 people by ethnicity 1034 as Slovak, 24 as Not found out, 14 as Hungarian, 5 as Czech, 3 as Russian, 3 as Other, 1 as Irish, 1 as Italian, 1 as Romani, 1 as Rusyn, 1 as Polish and 1 as German.

Note on population: The difference values of population numbers in the table "Population statistic" and in the sections "Ethnicity" & "Religion" is caused by the use of various statistical methods.

=== Religion ===
Census 2021 (1+ %)
Religion	Number	Fraction
Roman Catholic Church	774	71.8%
None	231	21.43%
Not found out	26	2.41%
Greek Catholic Church	17	1.58%
Evangelical Church	11	1.02%
Total	1078	

In year 2021 was 1078 people by religion 774 from Roman Catholic Church, 231 from None, 26 from Not found out, 17 from Greek Catholic Church, 11 from Evangelical Church, 8 from Christian Congregations in Slovakia, 4 from Old Catholic Church, 3 from Calvinist Church, 2 from Other, 1 from Eastern Orthodox Church and 1 from Jehovah's Witnesses.

== Facilities ==
The village has a public library a gym and football pitch.

== See also ==
- List of municipalities and towns in Slovakia

== Genealogical resources ==
The records for genealogical research are available at the state archive "Statny Archiv in Nitra, Slovakia"

- Roman Catholic church records (births/marriages/deaths): 1739-1896 (parish B)
