= Šurianky =

Village and municipality in Nitra Region, Slovakia

Šurianky Surányka
- Municipality
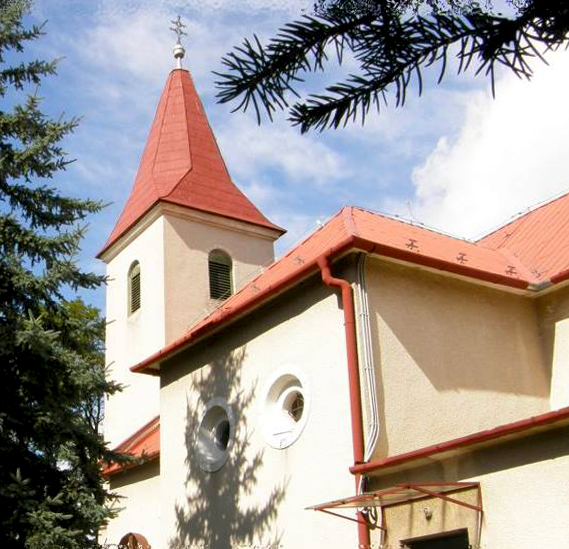

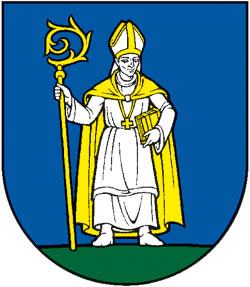
- Flag Coat of arms

- Location of Šurianky in the Nitra Region Location of Šurianky in Slovakia
- Coordinates: 48.43°N 18.02°E
- Country: Slovakia
- Region: Nitra Region
- District: Nitra District
- First mentioned: 1270

Area
  - Total: 10.39 km^{2} (4.01 sq mi)
- Elevation: 160 m (520 ft)

Population (2025)
  - Total: 573
- Time zone: UTC+1 (CET)
  - Summer (DST): UTC+2 (CEST)
- Postal code: 951 26
- Area code: +421 37
- Vehicle registration plate (until 2022): NR
- Website: www.obecsurianky.sk/sk/Obec-Surianky.html

Šurianky (Hungarian: Surányka) is a village and municipality in the Nitra District in western central Slovakia, in the Nitra Region.

== History ==
In historical records the village was first mentioned in 1270.

== Geography ==
The municipality lies at an altitude of 160 metres (520 ft) and covers an area of 10.39 km^{2} (4.01 sq mi) (2025).

== Population ==
Population statistic (10 years)
Year	1995	2005	2015	2025
Count	545	584	603	573
Difference		+7.15%	+3.25%	−4.97%

Population statistic
Year	2024	2025
Count	572	573
Difference		+0.17%

It has a population of 573 people (31 December 2025).

=== Ethnicity ===
Census 2021 (1+ %)
Ethnicity	Number	Fraction
Slovak	574	97.61%
Not found out	15	2.55%
Total	588	

In year 2021 was 588 people by ethnicity 574 as Slovak, 15 as Not found out, 4 as Romanian, 3 as Russian, 3 as Hungarian and 1 as German.

Note on population: The difference values of population numbers in the table "Population statistic" and in the sections "Ethnicity" & "Religion" is caused by the use of various statistical methods.

=== Religion ===
Census 2021 (1+ %)
Religion	Number	Fraction
Roman Catholic Church	484	82.31%
None	67	11.39%
Evangelical Church	16	2.72%
Not found out	11	1.87%
Total	588	

In year 2021 was 588 people by religion 484 from Roman Catholic Church, 67 from None, 16 from Evangelical Church, 11 from Not found out, 3 from Calvinist Church, 3 from Other, 3 from Ad hoc movements and 1 from Old Catholic Church.
