= Malý Cetín =

Malý Cetín Kiscétény
- Municipality
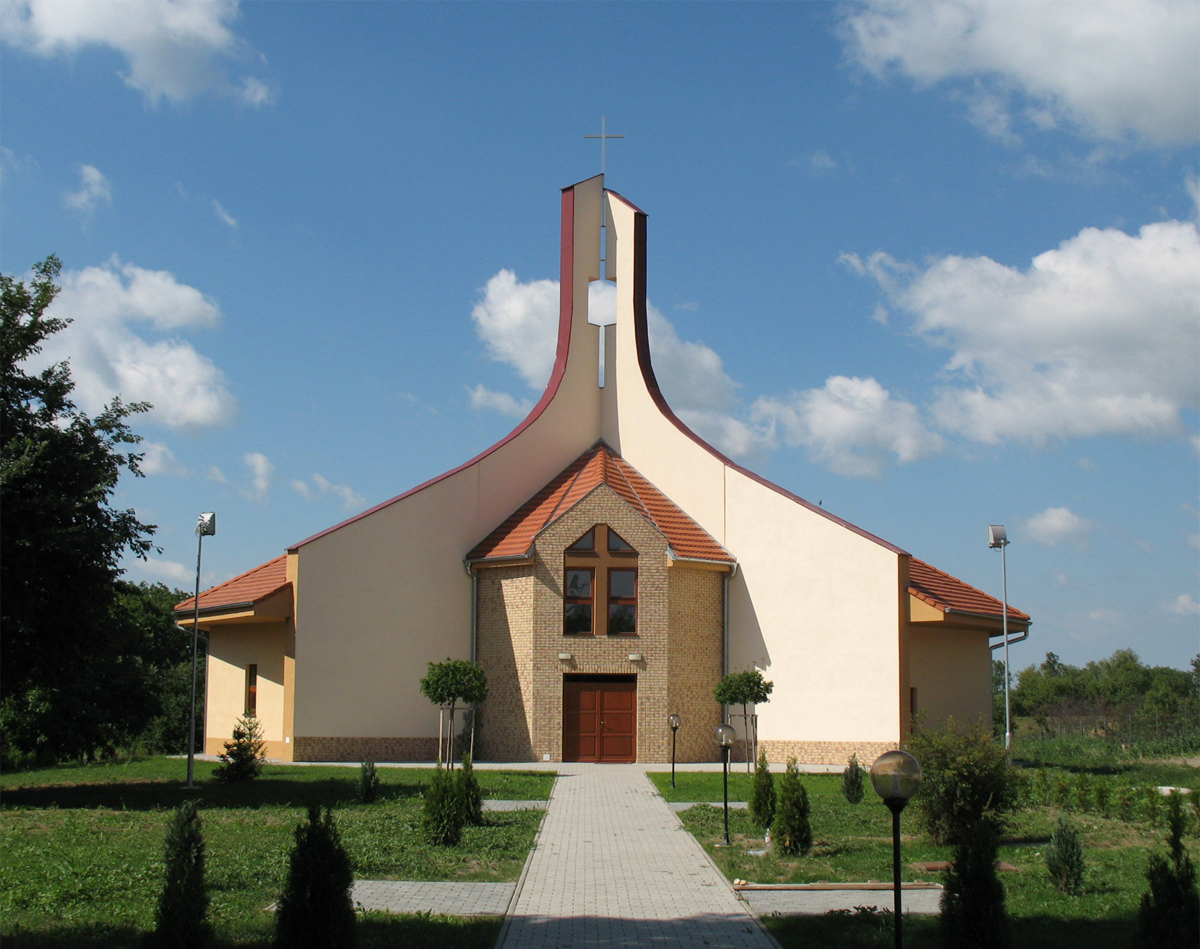
- Church of Malý Cetín

- Flag

- Location of Malý Cetín in the Nitra Region Location of Malý Cetín in Slovakia
- Coordinates: 48.23°N 18.18°E
- Country: Slovakia
- Region: Nitra Region
- District: Nitra District
- First mentioned: 1113

Area
  - Total: 5.15 km^{2} (1.99 sq mi)
- Elevation: 131 m (430 ft)

Population (2025)
  - Total: 509
- Time zone: UTC+1 (CET)
  - Summer (DST): UTC+2 (CEST)
- Postal code: 951 05
- Area code: +421 37
- Vehicle registration plate (until 2022): NR
- Website: www.maly-cetin.sk

Malý Cetín (Hungarian: Kiscétény) is a village and municipality in the Nitra District in western central Slovakia, in the Nitra Region.

== History ==
In historical records, the village was first mentioned in 1113.

== Geography ==
The municipality lies at an altitude of 131 metres (430 ft) and covers an area of 5.15 km^{2} (1.99 sq mi) (2025).

== Population ==
Population statistic (10 years)
Year	1995	2005	2015	2025
Count	368	384	398	509
Difference		+4.34%	+3.64%	+27.88%

Population statistic
Year	2024	2025
Count	502	509
Difference		+1.39%

It has a population of 509 people (31 December 2025).

=== Ethnicity ===
Census 2021 (1+ %)
Ethnicity	Number	Fraction
Slovak	409	90.48%
Hungarian	39	8.62%
Not found out	12	2.65%
Total	452	

In year 2021 was 452 people by ethnicity 409 as Slovak, 39 as Hungarian, 12 as Not found out, 2 as Czech, 1 as Greek and 1 as Croatian.

Note on population: The difference values of population numbers in the table "Population statistic" and in the sections "Ethnicity" & "Religion" is caused by the use of various statistical methods.

=== Religion ===
Census 2021 (1+ %)
Religion	Number	Fraction
Roman Catholic Church	332	73.45%
None	85	18.81%
Not found out	12	2.65%
Christian Congregations in Slovakia	8	1.77%
Evangelical Church	7	1.55%
Total	452	

In year 2021 was 452 people by religion 332 from Roman Catholic Church, 85 from None, 12 from Not found out, 8 from Christian Congregations in Slovakia, 7 from Evangelical Church, 2 from Calvinist Church, 2 from Greek Catholic Church, 1 from Eastern Orthodox Church, 1 from Other, 1 from Apostolic Church and 1 from Ad hoc movements.

== Facilities ==
The village has a public library.
