= Nitra District =

Coordinates: 48°18′36″N 18°5′9″E

- District
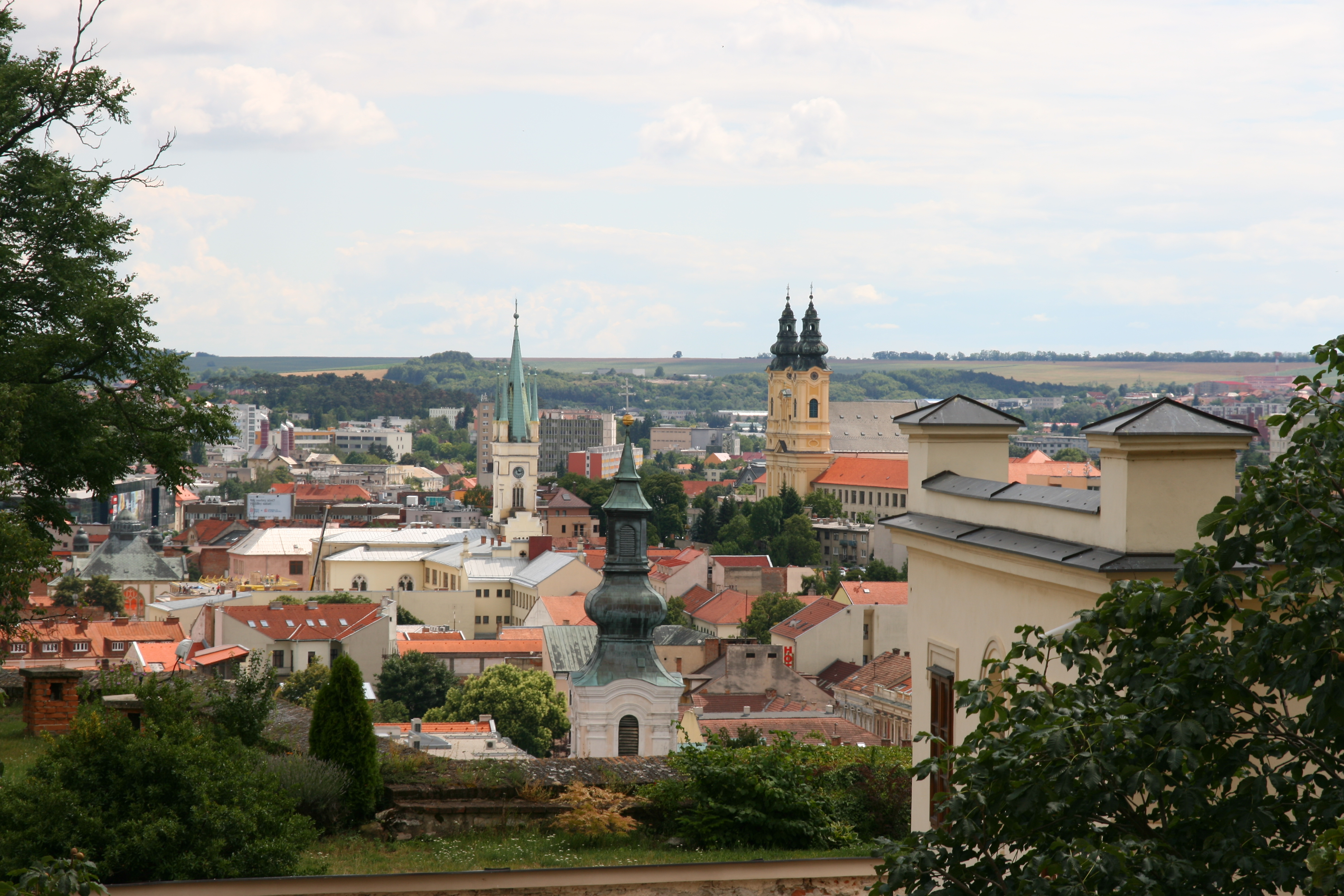
- Country: Slovakia
- Region: Nitra Region
- Seat: Nitra

Area
  - Total: 870.71 km^{2} (336.18 sq mi)

Population (2025)
  - Total: 164,220
- Time zone: UTC+1 (CET)
  - Summer (DST): UTC+2 (CEST)
- Telephone prefix: 037
- Vehicle registration plate (until 2022): NR
- Municipalities: 62

Nitra District (Slovak: okres Nitra) is a district in the Nitra Region of western Slovakia. It is the second most populated of Slovakia's 79 districts, after Prešov District. Before 1996 the present-day district belonged to the West-Slovak region (Západoslovenský kraj). It is named after the city of Nitra, its main economy and cultural center.

Historical population
Year	Pop.	±%
1970	140,333	—
1980	152,627	+8.8%
1991	160,725	+5.3%
2001	163,540	+1.8%
2011	159,143	−2.7%
2021	164,788	+3.5%
Source: Censuses

== Population ==
Population statistic (10 years)
Year	1995	2005	2015	2025
Count	162,592	163,768	160,381	164,220
Difference		+0.72%	−2.06%	+2.39%

Population statistic
Year	2024	2025
Count	164,577	164,220
Difference		−0.21%

It has a population of 164,220 people (31 December 2025).

=== Ethnicity ===
Census 2021 (1+ %)
Ethnicity	Number	Fraction
Slovak	147,827	87.22%
Not found out	9673	5.7%
Hungarian	7792	4.59%
Total	169,484	

In year 2021 was 169,484 people by ethnicity 147,827 as Slovak, 9673 as Not found out, 7792 as Hungarian, 1174 as Czech, 678 as Other, 559 as Romani, 303 as Russian, 193 as Polish, 174 as Rusyn, 159 as German, 155 as Ukrainian, 119 as Italian, 98 as Vietnamese, 66 as Moravian, 64 as Romanian, 56 as Serbian, 47 as Croatian, 45 as Chinese, 42 as Jewish, 42 as Bulgarian, 36 as Greek, 36 as English, 36 as Albanian, 30 as Austrian, 20 as Turkish, 20 as French, 17 as Irish, 14 as Canadian, 5 as Iranian, 3 as Silesian and 1 as Korean.

Note on population: The difference values of population numbers in the table "Population statistic" and in the sections "Ethnicity" & "Religion" is caused by the use of various statistical methods.

=== Religion ===
Census 2021 (1+ %)
Religion	Number	Fraction
Roman Catholic Church	106,793	64.81%
None	38,247	23.21%
Not found out	10,900	6.61%
Evangelical Church	3446	2.09%
Total	164,788	

In year 2021 was 164,788 people by religion 106,793 from Roman Catholic Church, 38,247 from None, 10,900 from Not found out, 3446 from Evangelical Church, 1100 from Greek Catholic Church, 815 from Christian Congregations in Slovakia, 651 from Ad hoc movements, 564 from Other, 368 from Calvinist Church, 328 from Eastern Orthodox Church, 285 from Other and not ascertained christian church, 216 from Jehovah's Witnesses, 208 from Buddhism, 173 from Paganism and natural spirituality, 171 from Apostolic Church, 141 from Old Catholic Church, 94 from Islam, 58 from United Methodist Church, 52 from Church of the Brethren, 50 from Jewish community, 41 from Seventh-day Adventist Church, 34 from Hinduism, 23 from Church of Jesus Christ of Latter-day Saints, 11 from Czechoslovak Hussite Church, 11 from Baptists Church, 7 from Bahá'i Community and 1 from New Apostolic Church.

== Municipalities ==
Municipality	Area [km^{2}]	Population
Alekšince	15.07	1,876
Babindol	5.41	766
Báb	20.09	1,253
Bádice	0.00	399
Branč	13.80	2,151
Cabaj-Čápor	34.42	4,403
Čab	0.00	757
Čakajovce	5.77	1,158
Čechynce	5.86	1,287
Čeľadice	10.47	1,117
Čifáre	15.33	586
Dolné Lefantovce	0.00	713
Dolné Obdokovce	10.18	1,137
Golianovo	10.70	2,031
Horné Lefantovce	23.21	839
Hosťová	4.78	424
Hruboňovo	11.55	591
Ivanka pri Nitre	14.90	3,102
Jarok	22.11	2,148
Jelenec	27.18	2,096
Jelšovce	10.44	962
Kapince	5.83	169
Klasov	12.23	1,434
Kolíňany	12.50	1,542
Lehota	11.00	2,424
Lúčnica nad Žitavou	12.10	1,008
Ľudovítová	1.87	233
Lukáčovce	16.83	1,161
Lužianky	12.42	3,556
Malé Chyndice	7.88	394
Malé Zálužie	5.90	272
Malý Cetín	5.15	509
Malý Lapáš	3.21	1,534
Melek	6.19	564
Mojmírovce	32.26	2,995
Nitra	107.97	75,301
Nitrianske Hrnčiarovce	9.94	2,441
Nová Ves nad Žitavou	10.17	1,398
Nové Sady	25.62	1,312
Paňa	11.26	431
Podhorany	21.81	1,154
Pohranice	12.08	1,150
Poľný Kesov	10.22	635
Rišňovce	18.78	2,118
Rumanová	11.65	855
Svätoplukovo	13.89	1,471
Štefanovičová	0.00	357
Štitáre	0.00	1,289
Šurianky	10.39	573
Tajná	8.48	282
Telince	6.84	429
Veľká Dolina	11.68	719
Veľké Chyndice	5.04	341
Veľké Zálužie	32.10	4,341
Veľký Cetín	16.86	1,598
Veľký Lapáš	8.15	2,126
Vinodol	14.98	2,011
Vráble	38.31	8,170
Výčapy-Opatovce	14.18	2,139
Zbehy	19.55	2,269
Žirany	15.55	1,322
Žitavce	8.28	397

Population and area values are current for year 2025.

== Source ==
Lacika, Ján (2005). Slovaquie en bref. Priroda. ISBN 80-07-01377-6.
