= Hosťová =

Municipality of Slovakia

Hosťová Nyitrageszte
- Municipality

- Flag

- Location of Hosťová in the Nitra Region Location of Hosťová in Slovakia
- Coordinates: 48.33°N 18.22°E
- Country: Slovakia
- Region: Nitra Region
- District: Nitra District
- First mentioned: 1232

Area
  - Total: 4.78 km^{2} (1.85 sq mi)
- Elevation: 195 m (640 ft)

Population (2025)
  - Total: 424
- Time zone: UTC+1 (CET)
  - Summer (DST): UTC+2 (CEST)
- Postal code: 951 02
- Area code: +421 37
- Vehicle registration plate (until 2022): NR
- Website: www.hostova.sk

Hosťová (Hungarian: Nyitrageszte) is a village and municipality in the Nitra District in western central Slovakia, in the Nitra Region.

== History ==
In historical records, the village was first mentioned in 1232.

== Geography ==
The municipality lies at an altitude of 195 metres (640 ft) and covers an area of 4.78 km^{2} (1.85 sq mi) (2025).

== Population ==
Population statistic (10 years)
Year	1995	2005	2015	2025
Count	395	366	376	424
Difference		−7.34%	+2.73%	+12.76%

Population statistic
Year	2024	2025
Count	428	424
Difference		−0.93%

It has a population of 424 people (31 December 2025).

=== Ethnicity ===
Census 2021 (1+ %)
Ethnicity	Number	Fraction
Hungarian	238	60.71%
Slovak	180	45.91%
Not found out	10	2.55%
Czech	4	1.02%
Total	392	

In year 2021 was 392 people by ethnicity 238 as Hungarian, 180 as Slovak, 10 as Not found out, 4 as Czech, 2 as Croatian and 1 as Serbian.

Note on population: The difference values of population numbers in the table "Population statistic" and in the sections "Ethnicity" & "Religion" is caused by the use of various statistical methods.

=== Religion ===
Census 2021 (1+ %)
Religion	Number	Fraction
Roman Catholic Church	337	85.97%
None	39	9.95%
Not found out	6	1.53%
Total	392	

In year 2021 was 392 people by religion 337 from Roman Catholic Church, 39 from None, 6 from Not found out, 2 from Calvinist Church, 2 from Eastern Orthodox Church, 2 from Christian Congregations in Slovakia, 1 from Other and not ascertained christian church, 1 from Greek Catholic Church, 1 from Evangelical Church and 1 from Ad hoc movements.

== Facilities ==
The village has a public library, a gym, and a football pitch.

== See also ==
- List of municipalities and towns in Slovakia

== Genealogical resources ==
The records for genealogical research are available at the state archive "Statny Archiv in Nitra, Slovakia"

- Roman Catholic church records (births/marriages/deaths): 1751-1911 (parish B)
