= Babindol =

Babindol Babindál
- Municipality
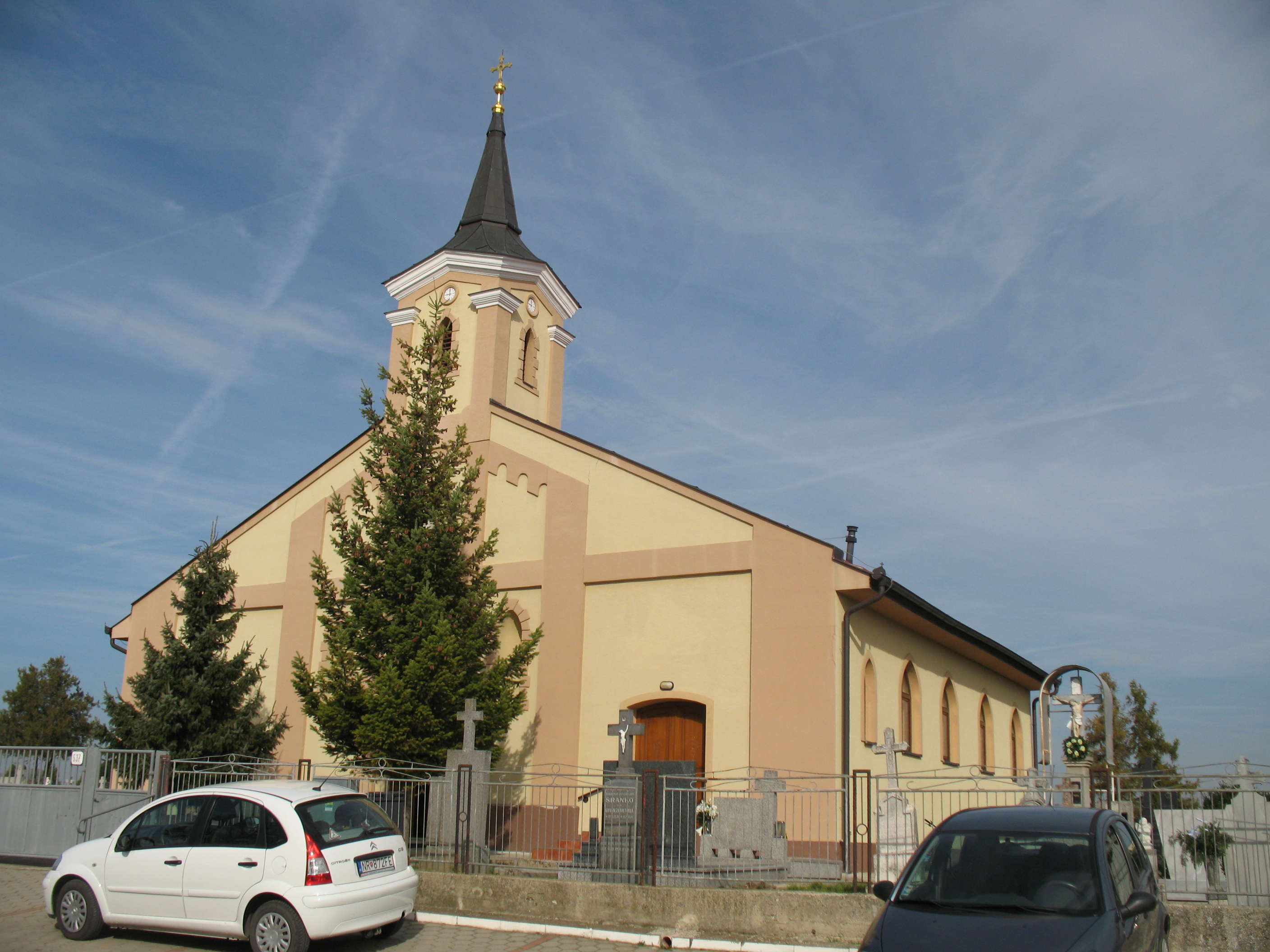

- Flag

- Location of Babindol in the Nitra Region Location of Babindol in Slovakia
- Coordinates: 48.29°N 18.24°E
- Country: Slovakia
- Region: Nitra Region
- District: Nitra District
- First mentioned: 1271

Area
  - Total: 5.41 km^{2} (2.09 sq mi)
- Elevation: 195 m (640 ft)

Population (2025)
  - Total: 766
- Time zone: UTC+1 (CET)
  - Summer (DST): UTC+2 (CEST)
- Postal code: 951 53
- Area code: +421 37
- Vehicle registration plate (until 2022): NR
- Website: www.babindol.sk

Babindol (Hungarian: Babindál) is a village and municipality in the Nitra District in western Slovakia, in the Nitra Region.

== History ==
In historical records the village was first mentioned in 1271.

== Geography ==
The municipality lies at an altitude of 195 metres (640 ft) and covers an area of 5.41 km^{2} (2.09 sq mi) (2025).

== Population ==
Population statistic (10 years)
Year	1995	2005	2015	2025
Count	0	649	725	766
Difference		–	+11.71%	+5.65%

Population statistic
Year	2024	2025
Count	768	766
Difference		−0.26%

It has a population of 766 people (31 December 2025).

=== Ethnicity ===
Census 2021 (1+ %)
Ethnicity	Number	Fraction
Slovak	606	79.52%
Hungarian	134	17.58%
Not found out	42	5.51%
Total	762	

In year 2021 was 762 people by ethnicity 606 as Slovak, 134 as Hungarian, 42 as Not found out, 5 as Romanian, 3 as Czech, 3 as Polish, 2 as Italian, 1 as Ukrainian and 1 as Other.

Note on population: The difference values of population numbers in the table "Population statistic" and in the sections "Ethnicity" & "Religion" is caused by the use of various statistical methods.

=== Religion ===
Census 2021 (1+ %)
Religion	Number	Fraction
Roman Catholic Church	628	82.41%
None	83	10.89%
Not found out	41	5.38%
Total	762	

In year 2021 was 762 people by religion 628 from Roman Catholic Church, 83 from None, 41 from Not found out, 2 from Jehovah's Witnesses, 2 from Other, 2 from Greek Catholic Church, 1 from Old Catholic Church, 1 from Eastern Orthodox Church, 1 from Evangelical Church and 1 from Ad hoc movements.

== Facilities ==
The village has a public library and football pitch.

== Genealogical resources ==
The records for genealogical research are available at the state archive in Nitra (Slovak: Štátny archív v Nitre).

- Roman Catholic church records (births/marriages/deaths): 1749-1895
- Census records 1869 of Babindol are available at the state archive.

== See also ==
- List of municipalities and towns in Slovakia
