= Svätoplukovo =

- Municipality
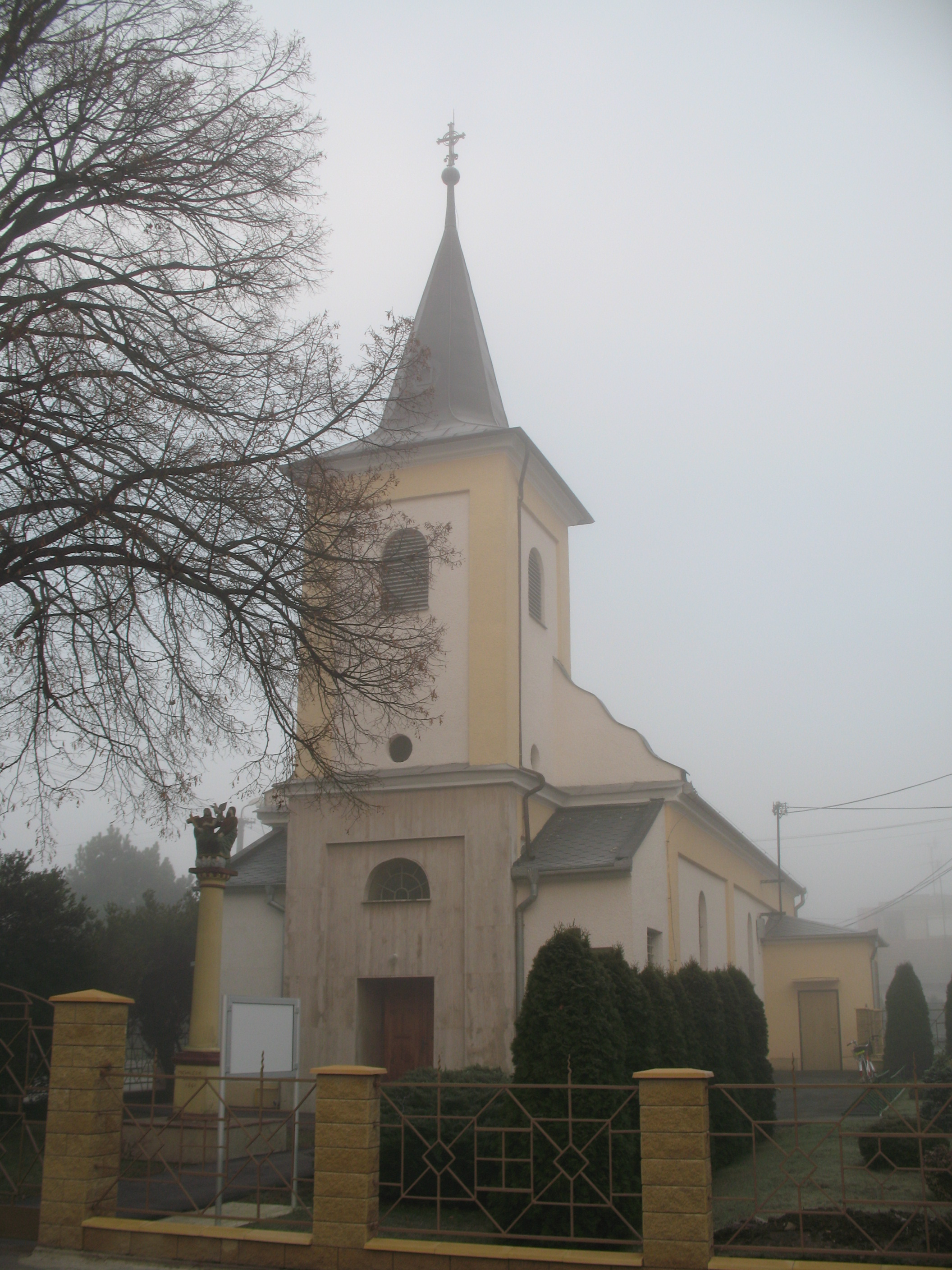
- Our Lady of the Rosary church

- Flag

- Location of Svätoplukovo in the Nitra Region Location of Svätoplukovo in Slovakia
- Coordinates: 48.23°N 18.05°E
- Country: Slovakia
- Region: Nitra Region
- District: Nitra District
- First mentioned: 1386

Area
  - Total: 13.89 km^{2} (5.36 sq mi)
- Elevation: 140 m (460 ft)

Population (2025)
  - Total: 1,471
- Time zone: UTC+1 (CET)
  - Summer (DST): UTC+2 (CEST)
- Postal code: 951 16
- Area code: +421 37
- Vehicle registration plate (until 2022): NR
- Website: www.svatoplukovo.eu

Svätoplukovo (Slovak pronunciation: [ˈsʋɛɐtɔplukɔʋɔ]), until 1948 Šalgov (Hungarian: Salgó) is a village and municipality in the Nitra District in western central Slovakia, in the Nitra Region.

== History ==
In historical records the village was first mentioned in 1386.

== Geography ==
The municipality lies at an altitude of 140 metres (460 ft) and covers an area of 13.89 km^{2} (5.36 sq mi) (2025).

== Population ==
Population statistic (10 years)
Year	1995	2005	2015	2025
Count	1275	1313	1321	1471
Difference		+2.98%	+0.60%	+11.35%

Population statistic
Year	2024	2025
Count	1469	1471
Difference		+0.13%

It has a population of 1471 people (31 December 2025).

=== Ethnicity ===
Census 2021 (1+ %)
Ethnicity	Number	Fraction
Slovak	1321	96.56%
Romani	41	2.99%
Not found out	40	2.92%
Total	1368	

In year 2021 was 1368 people by ethnicity 1321 as Slovak, 41 as Romani, 40 as Not found out, 9 as Other, 7 as Hungarian, 4 as Czech, 2 as Polish, 1 as Rusyn, 1 as Romanian, 1 as French and 1 as Croatian.

Note on population: The difference values of population numbers in the table "Population statistic" and in the sections "Ethnicity" & "Religion" is caused by the use of various statistical methods.

=== Religion ===
Census 2021 (1+ %)
Religion	Number	Fraction
Roman Catholic Church	898	65.64%
None	256	18.71%
Evangelical Church	132	9.65%
Not found out	44	3.22%
Greek Catholic Church	19	1.39%
Total	1368	

In year 2021 was 1368 people by religion 898 from Roman Catholic Church, 256 from None, 132 from Evangelical Church, 44 from Not found out, 19 from Greek Catholic Church, 7 from United Methodist Church, 5 from Ad hoc movements, 4 from Christian Congregations in Slovakia, 1 from Paganism and natural spirituality, 1 from Other and not ascertained christian church and 1 from Jehovah's Witnesses.
