= John Hont-Pázmány =

Hungarian prelate

- Archbishop of Kalocsa
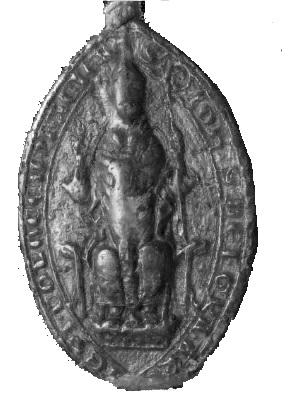
- Seal of John Hont-Pázmány, 1291
- Installed: 1278
- Term ended: 1301
- Predecessor: Stephen Báncsa
- Successor: Stephen

Personal details
- Died: September–October 1301 Buda, Hungary
- Buried: St. John monastery in Buda
- Denomination: Roman Catholic
- Parents: Andrew Hont-Pázmány; Maria Nánabeszter
- Education: University of Bologna

John Hont-Pázmány (Hungarian: Hont-Pázmány nembeli János; died September–October 1301) was a prelate in the Kingdom of Hungary at the turn of the 13th and 14th centuries. He was Archbishop of Kalocsa between 1278 and 1301. In this capacity, he closely cooperated with fellow Archbishop Lodomer in order to restore royal authority over the kingdom. After Lodomer's death, John became head of the royal council from 1298 to 1301, initiating profound constitutional changes in the parliamentary system. He crowned Wenceslaus, one of the pretenders to Hungary, king in 1301, provoking the wrath of the Holy See.

== Family ==
John was born into the Forgács branch of the wealthy and prestigious gens (clan) Hont-Pázmány around 1240. The ancestors of the kindred, Swabian knights Hont and Pázmány arrived to the Principality of Hungary in the late 10th century, according to the chronicle of John's contemporary Simon of Kéza. John's father was Andrew, who erected castles near Turóc and Gímes (present-day Kláštor pod Znievom and Jelenec in Slovakia, respectively) following the First Mongol invasion of Hungary. He was a faithful confidant of Béla IV, then Stephen V. Andrew served as count of the tárnoks (financial officials) from 1249 to 1256, and ispán of Bánya (Árkibánya) ispánate on several occasions, which laid in the territory of Nyitra County. John's mother was Maria Nánabeszter.

John had several siblings, who also rose to prominence during the last decades of the 13th century. Thomas functioned as Judge royal (1291–1293), then Master of the horse (1293), and was considered a strong ally of his brother John in the royal advisory council. Andrew and Ivánka were skilled soldiers and served faithfully King Andrew III in his campaigns against the oligarchs. Both of them were killed in battles against the powerful rebellious lord Matthew Csák. Through his elder son, Andrew was ancestor of the Forgács (or Forgách) noble family, which still exists and provided several magnates for the Hungarian elite in the following centuries. John's another brother was Nicholas, who was mentioned between 1295 and 1297. He also had two sisters, Yolanda and an unidentified one, who married Atyócs of Zólyom and Peter Szikszói, respectively. John owned Rimóca (present-day Lehota nad Rimavicou, Slovakia) and was involved in a lawsuit over an intermediate land with his distant kin comes Nicholas, who owned the neighboring Kecege (today Kociha, Slovakia) in 1298.

== Early career ==
It is plausible that John attended the University of Bologna, where obtained a degree of doctor of canon law (Latin: decretorum doctor). He was styled as "magister" throughout his ecclesiastical career. When he returned to Hungary, his ecclesiastical career ascended quickly into the highest dignities. He functioned as a royal chaplain in the court of Stephen V from 1270 to 1272. He retained his position following the ascension of Ladislaus IV to the Hungarian throne. Beside his office in the royal court, John also served as archdeacon of Gömör in the Archdiocese of Esztergom between 1273 and 1274. He was granted the villages Újlak and Özdöge (present-day Veľké Zálužie and Mojzesovo in Slovakia, respectively) for his faithful service by Ladislaus IV in October 1273. The young monarch also donated a land called Harsány in Nyitra County to John for the same reason in July 1274.

John became count (head) of the royal chapel (Hungarian: kápolnaispán) by August 1276. Beside that, he also functioned as archdeacon of Nyitra (Nitra) during that time. In that year, he and his brothers were granted the village of Nemcsics, which laid near their castle of Gímes. According to the charter of Ladislaus IV, the Hont-Pázmány brothers successfully defended the fortress during the wars with the Kingdom of Bohemia. According to a document with doubtful credit, John served as vice-chancellor of the royal court and provost of Buda in August 1277. He succeeded Benedict in the latter dignity. He was also a member of the cathedral chapter of Esztergom. He sold some portions from his land in Ilmér (later Ürmény, present-day Mojmírovce, Slovakia), belonging to Szolgagyőr (Galgóc) ispánate, and entrusted his bailiff, a certain comes Egidius to define and draw new boundaries. John participated in the national diet of prelates, barons and noblemen in May 1277, when the young monarch Ladislaus IV was declared to be of age. Thereafter, when Ladislaus IV confirmed his political alliance with Rudolf I of Germany against Ottokar II of Bohemia in July 1277, John was a member of that Hungarian diplomatic mission, which was sent to Vienna. By the next year, in the summer of 1278, John was styled as vice-chancellor and provost-elect of Székesfehérvár, succeeding Thomas. Both Ladislaus IV and the collegiate chapter of Székesfehérvár petitioned to the Roman Curia to request the confirmation of John's election. Rudolf also wrote a letter to Pope Nicholas III, in which he expressed to support the case.

== Archbishop of Kalocsa ==
=== The Cuman question ===
Before his confirmation as provost of Székesfehérvár, John was elected as Archbishop of Kalocsa sometime around October 1278. He succeeded Stephen Báncsa in that dignity, who died in the summer of that year. John was also styled as chancellor of the royal court between November 1278 and March 1279. John was first referred to as archbishop-elect on 14 November, when transcribed and confirmed the privileges of the hospes (foreigner) gold miners of Rimaszombat (today Rimavská Sobota, Slovakia), who belonged under the suzerainty of the Archdiocese of Kalocsa despite the great distance. Around the same time with John's election, Pope Nicholas sent Philip, Bishop of Fermo, to Hungary to help Ladislaus IV restore royal power and to arrange a number of Church irregularities in Hungary. The papal legate arrived in the kingdom in early 1279. The pope instructed Philip on 13 June 1279 to investigate the circumstances and regularity of John's election. On the same day, the papal legate appointed Lodomer as Archbishop of Esztergom on behalf of Pope Nicholas. In the midst of an escalating situation between the Holy See and the Hungarian royal court, the election in the Archdiocese of Kalocsa remained a marginal issue, as a result, the investigation process and the subsequent papal confirmation of John's election were delayed for years; he was still referred to as archbishop-elect throughout the years 1279 and 1280 too.

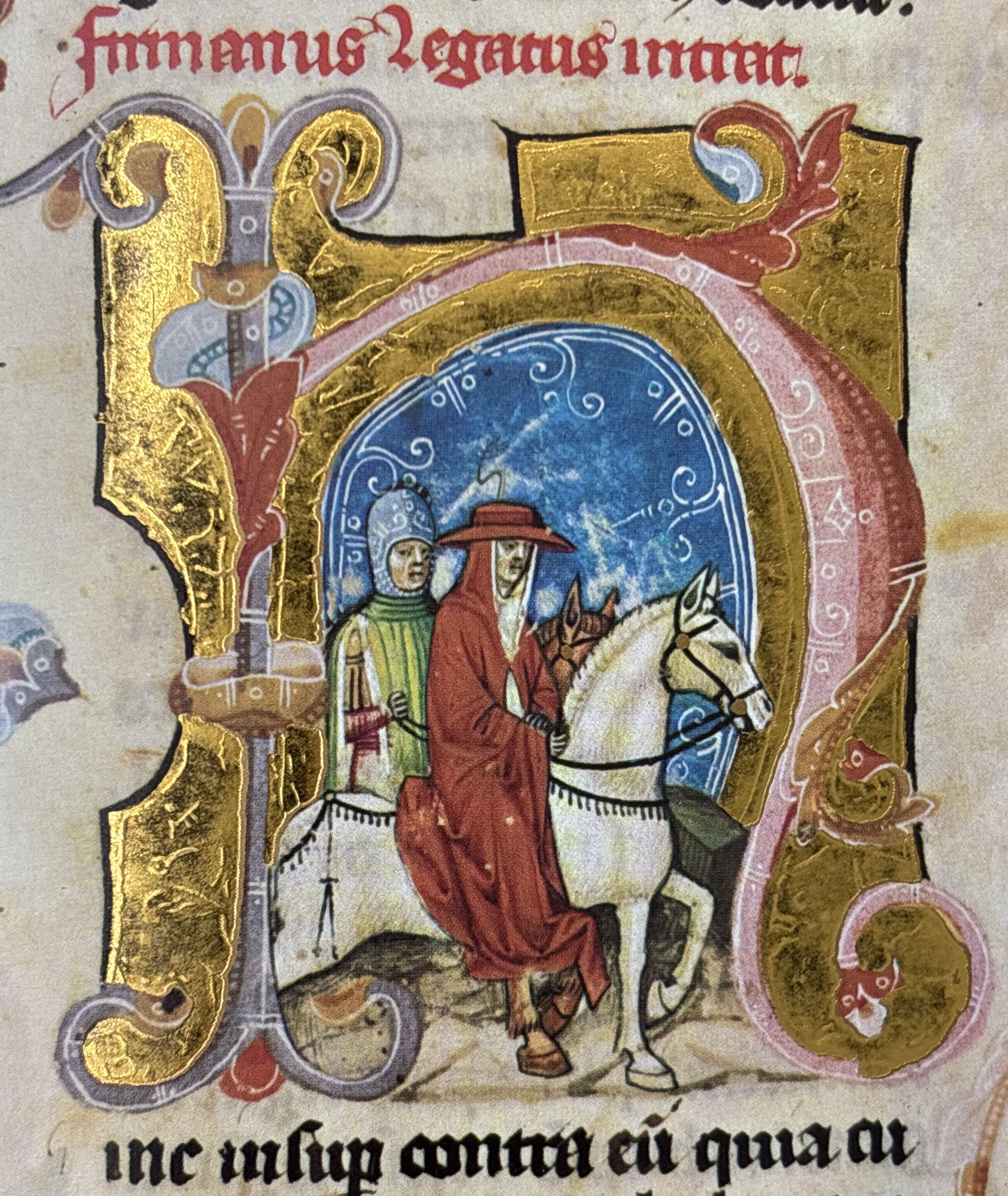
Papal legate Philip, Bishop of Fermo arrives to Hungary, as depicted in the Illuminated Chronicle

The arrival of papal legate Philip deepened the turmoil in Hungary. Initially, with the legate's mediation, Ladislaus IV concluded a peace treaty with the Kőszegis. Bishop Philip soon realized, however, that most Cumans were still pagans in Hungary. He extracted a ceremonious promise from the Cuman chieftains of giving up their pagan customs, and persuaded the young King Ladislaus to swear an oath to enforce the keeping of the Cuman chieftains' promise. An assembly held at Tétény passed laws which, in accordance with the legate's demand, prescribed that the Cumans should leave their tents and live "in houses attached to the ground". The national diet also authorized John Hont-Pázmány and four other bishops, whose dioceses were inhabited by a significant number of Cuman tribes, to visit and baptize the Cumans, to liberate Hungarian prisoners and to examine the noble lands surrounded by the tribes. Following that the papal legate convened a synod in Buda on 14 September 1279, where the two archbishops, Lodomer and John, along with their suffragans attended.

The Cumans did not obey the laws, however, and Ladislaus IV, himself a half-Cuman, failed to force them. In retaliation, Philip of Fermo excommunicated him and placed Hungary under interdict in October. Ladislaus joined the Cumans and appealed to the Holy See, but Pope Nicholas III refused to absolve him. The policy of the papal legate, who had no regard for local political conditions, forced the Hungarian prelates to decide between the Hungarian monarch and the Roman Curia. Under such circumstances, Archbishop John was dismissed as royal chancellor sometime after March 1279. Following Ladislaus' step, when the Cumans seized and imprisoned Philip of Fermo in early January 1280, the prelates, who expressed "the liberty of the Church", turned against the royal power, and became his relentless opponents. Soon, Ladislaus was also captured. In less than two months, both the legate and the king were set free and Ladislaus took a new oath to enforce the "Cuman laws". This resulted a series of rebellions by the Cumans, who also pillaged and plundered the territory of the Archbishopric of Kalocsa, especially the area of Baja, whose inhabitants fled to the church of the Hájszentlőrinc Chapter. In the following years the archbishopric became a location of acts of war, when Ladislaus launched military campaigns against the rebellious Cumans.

Bishop Philip of Fermo left Hungary in the summer of 1281. Before his departure, he finally confirmed John's election, which occurred two and a half years earlier. Pope Martin IV already styled John as simply archbishop on 18 June 1282. In this letter, the pope ordered John to consecrate Thomas, the provost of Vasvár, who was elected Bishop of Várad. Before that, papal legate Philip refused to confirm the election, because Thomas was not ordained to the priesthood despite the decrees of the Second Council of Lyon. The cathedral chapter argued the decree applied only to the provosts dealing with pastoral care. Pope Martin accepted the argument and instructed Thomas' superior John to consecrate him.

=== Lodomer's ally ===
Since 1279, Lodomer and John Hont-Pázmány worked closely together in order to restore strong royal power, which was utterly weakened during the reign of Ladislaus IV. John actively supported his colleague in all efforts against the monarch. When Pope Nicholas IV proclaimed a crusade against Ladislaus and the Cumans at the turn of 1288 and 1289, John began to gather an army against his pagan subjects in the territory of the Archdiocese of Kalocsa. Around the same time, Duke Albert I of Austria launched a massive royal campaign against the Kőszegi family along the western border of Hungary, capturing dozens of castles. Ladislaus did not oppose the conquest because of the Kőszegis' continuous anti-royal uprisings. Four prelates, Lodomer, John, Andrew, Bishop of Győr and Benedict Rád, Bishop of Veszprém sent a letter to the monarch to change his way of life and behavior because the people will turn against him, according to the contemporary Steirische Reimchronik ("Styrian Rhyming Chronicle"). With the consent of Lodomer (and plausibly John), the Kőszegis offered the crown to the king's distant relative Andrew the Venetian, who arrived to Hungary in early 1290. Soon, Ladislaus was assassinated by three Cumans in July 1290.

Andrew III was crowned king on 23 July 1290. John Hont-Pázmány was re-installed as royal chancellor in the next month. He held the office until the death of Andrew in 1301. Despite the highest court position John obtained, Lodomer was considered undoubtedly the strongest advisor of Andrew's reign. Under his guidance, Andrew III issued a charter promising the restoration of internal peace and respect for the privileges of the nobility and the clergymen. The king convened a national assembly to Óbuda in the first days of September 1290, where he promised to preserve the rights and privileges of the nobility. In accordance with the adopted laws, both Lodomer and John were authorized to review the late Ladislaus' land donations. For instance, Andrew confirmed the powerful lord Amadeus Aba as ispán of Ung County in 1290, upon the request of the two archbishops. The skilled soldier Abraham the Red was also granted landholdings upon the advice of Lodomer and John in June 1291. In the following years, several royal land donations were strengthened by the seals of the two archbishops, for instance in the case of George Baksa in August 1291 (for his role in the war against Austria) and Radoslav Babonić in July 1293 (for the successful liberation of Ugrin Csák). From 1291 to 1293, altogether twelve royal charters emphasize the active advisory role of Lodomer and John, which imply significant influence over the monarch in political and economic affairs.

In order to establish the new monarch's political alliance with foreign realms, Lodomer and John Hont-Pázmány welcomed the arriving Queen Fenenna in Upper Hungary; she became the first wife of Andrew III before the end of 1290. In the next year, Andrew III invaded Austria, forcing Duke Albert to withdraw his garrisons from the towns and fortresses that he had captured years before. John also participated in the royal campaign. Following that Lodomer and John Hont-Pázmány, along with a Williamite friar, negotiated with Albert's envoys Bernhard of Prambach, Bishop of Passau and Leopold, Bishop of Seckau about the conditions for peace, because the campaign prolonged, which was unfavorable for both sides. The Peace of Hainburg, which concluded the war, was signed on 26 August 1291, and three days later Andrew and Albert of Austria confirmed it at their meeting in Köpcsény (now Kopčany in Slovakia). In accordance with the prelates' goal, the peace treaty prescribed the destruction of the fortresses that Albert of Austria had seized from the Kőszegis earlier. For the archbishops, this meant lasting peace with the western neighbor and breakdown of the power of the Kőszegi family, a constant threat to the royal power.

The Hungarian prelates, under the leadership of Lodomer, became the strongest pillars of the royal power, to protect the national sovereignty of the kingdom even against the pope's aspirations. They pursued an independent policy, maintaining an influence and pressure on Andrew, whose legitimacy was questionable due to his uncertain origin. On 31 January 1291, Pope Nicholas IV sent a letter to John, in which he expressed disappointment that the archbishop failed to continue the correspondence to inform the Holy See about the domestic conditions in Hungary, including the situation of the heretics and the pagans in the Archdiocese of Kalocsa. The Peace of Hainburg resulted that Kőszegis rose up in open rebellion against Andrew in spring 1292, acknowledging Charles Martel of Anjou, as King of Hungary, whose claim was also supported by the Holy See. From 1293 to 1298, sources rarely mentions John's name separately. As chancellor, he transcribed three royal charters upon the request of Michael, provost of Buda in January 1295. He successfully recovered the tithe of Csepel for the Bishopric of Veszprém from Queen Agnes, Andrew's second spouse in April 1296.

=== Head of the royal council ===
The wealthy and prominent baron Matthew Csák, who inherited large-scale domains in Upper Hungary, turned against Andrew at the end of 1297. This personally affected John, because the Hont-Pázmány clan's landholdings laid in the region (Nyitra, Bars and Esztergom counties), in the neighborhood of the aggressively expanding lord's territory. John's brothers, Andrew, Ivánka and Nicholas picked fight against the rebellious baron, also representing the monarch's interests, who excused them from all the damage caused to the Csák brothers, Matthew and Csák, and their familiares. Around the same time, his long-time ally Lodomer died on 2 January 1298, thus John became the most senior member of the Hungarian prelacy. In early February 1298, John escorted Andrew to Vienna, who visited Albert of Austria and promised to support him against Adolf of Nassau, King of Germany. There, he was present at the betrothal of Elizabeth (Andrew's daughter) and Wenceslaus (Wenceslaus II's son).

Gregory Bicskei was elected as Lodomer's successor shortly thereafter. During that time, he was considered a loyal partisan of Andrew III, along with the other prelates of the church in Hungary. His relationship with the monarch and the other prelates had deteriorated permanently in the next six months. Historians agree that Bicskei wanted to reach the papal confirmation of his election as soon as possible, as a result he turned against Andrew and his courtiers, and became a strong advocate of the claim of Charles of Anjou to the Hungarian throne, who also enjoyed Pope Boniface VIII's support. With this step, Bicskei intended to disrupt the unity of the Hungarian prelates, but the suffragan bishops remained faithful to the monarch, with the leadership of John Hont-Pázmány. The new archbishop of Esztergom refused to attend that assembly of the prelates, noblemen, Saxons, Székelys, and Cumans, which was summoned by Andrew in Pest in the summer of 1298. Bicskei also forbade the prelates to participate at a new diet which was held around May 1299. In the same time, he convened a synod to Veszprém with his self-declared authority of legate, and obliged the bishops to participate at the event, with the threat of excommunication. However, John and the bishops ignored the archbishop's order. On 6 July 1299, Emeric, Bishop of Várad was commissioned to send a letter to Pope Boniface to interpret the complaints of Andrew III, Archbishop John and the "entire prelacy and nobility" regarding the behavior of Bicskei and asked Boniface to place them under papal patronage against Bicskei.

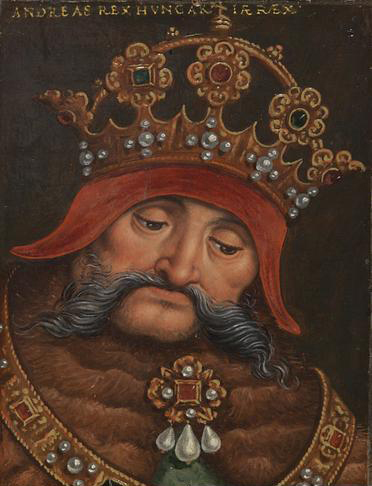
The portrait of Andrew III, painted by Anton Boys (16th century)

Because of Bicskei's resistance and political isolation, John became de facto head of the Hungarian Catholic Church until his death. Following Bicskei's departure, all vice-chancellors of the realm, considering the proteges of John, came from dioceses belonging to the supremacy of Kalocsa. In response to Bicskei's actions and Pope Boniface's support for the Capetian House of Anjou, John and his fellow bishops initiated the convocation of the 1298 national diet, which, excluding the participation of Andrew III and the barons of the realm, proved to be a watershed in the constitutional system of Hungary and the formation of the parliamentary system. During the diet, Andrew's maternal uncle, Albertino Morosini was granted Hungarian nobility. The phrase "universitas regni", which first appears in the final act, implies that the participants of the national diet summed up the community of the kingdom as a whole. One of the (23rd) articles of the 1298 diet established a four-member lesser council within the royal council, consisting of two nobles (representatives of the "nobility with uniform status") and two prelates (suffragans each belonging to the archdioceses of Esztergom and Kalocsa) with a three-month term. One of the noble councilors was Thomas Hont-Pázmány, Archbishop John's brother, despite his magnate of origin, which reflects the influence of their clan over the royal court. Their veto power prevented Bicskei from sabotaging the operation of the royal council, which resulted his total isolation in the state government, despite his nominal leading position in the royal council. John and the prelates had a virtually exclusive right to elect the four council members; both Thomas Hont-Pázmány and Henry Balog were considered supporters of the Hungarian clergy. Several other articles of the national diet provided rights for John and the prelates to review the king's decisions and extended the right to ecclesiastical sanction against the barons and even the king, in order to defend Church interests and property. The articles emphasized the authority of the archbishop of Kalocsa, which confirmed John's status as head of the Church in Hungary. Although Bicskei unsuccessfully attempt to shift the prelates from supporting Andrew, but the king' confidence in the Hungarian clergy was shaken due to his activity and the subsequent pro-prelate resolutions of the 1298 diet, as a result he shortly entered into a formal alliance with five influential barons, including Amadeus Aba and Stephen Ákos, who stated that they were willing to support him against the Pope and the bishops. Seeing the increased influence of John at the expense of royal authority, Andrew did not want to rely solely on the bishops during his reign.

After the rebellious Babonić family swore loyalty to Andrew in the summer of 1299, the monarch received them into his grace on 1 August upon the advice of Albertino Morosini, John Hont-Pázmány and the prelates of the realm. John and eight other bishops sealed the document, demonstrating the political unity of the Hungarian prelates. However, other events began to disrupt the political unity and stability that had developed. The conflict has recurred between Andrew III and Matthew Csák by the second half of 1299. Following a failed royal campaign led by Demetrius Balassa against the Csák territory, the oligarch's troops invaded the central parts of Upper Hungary. Archbishop John's brothers Andrew and Ivánka were killed in the skirmish. Around the same time, a harsh dispute emerged between Peter Monoszló, Bishop of Transylvania and Andrew, Bishop of Eger in the question of jurisdiction over the sparsely populated Máramaros region (today Maramureș in Romania). Andrew III, confirming the decisions of his predecessors, granted the jurisdiction over Máramaros to the Diocese of Eger. After Peter Monoszló's protest and pressure, he changed his intention, withdrawing the decision, and handed over the matter to the competence of John Hont-Pázmány in February 1299. As Andrew of Eger did not present at the archbishopric chancellery and Emeric, Bishop of Várad conducted on-site inspections among the local noblemen, who mostly supported Peter, King Andrew III decided to donate Máramaros to the Diocese of Transylvania. In response, Bishop Andrew has launched a new lawsuit, while Peter initiated an investigation to the Holy See, arguing with the unauthorized nature of the secular courts. This was the first sign of the disintegration of unity among the Hungarian bishops, which also jeopardized the functioning of the royal council they dominated.

=== Coronation of Wenceslaus ===
Andrew III of Hungary died on 14 January 1301, leaving no male heirs. He was the last male member of the Árpád dynasty. On hearing his death, Charles of Anjou hurried to Esztergom where Gregory Bicskei crowned him king in the spring of 1301. Being Pope Boniface's candidate for the Hungarian throne, Charles had always been unpopular, because the majority of the Hungarian lords feared that they would "lose their freedom by accepting a king appointed by the Church", according to the Illuminated Chronicle. Charles's coronation was not performed with the Holy Crown of Hungary in Székesfehérvár, as it was required by customary law, but with a provisional crown in Esztergom. John Hont-Pázmány and the overwhelming majority of the prelates also challenged Charles' legitimacy. They resided in Buda and guarded the crown jewelries. It is possible they also played a role in that action, when the burghers of Székesfehérvár closed the city gate and did not allow Charles' entourage. The barons and the prelates summoned a national diet at Buda, which declared Charles's coronation invalid.

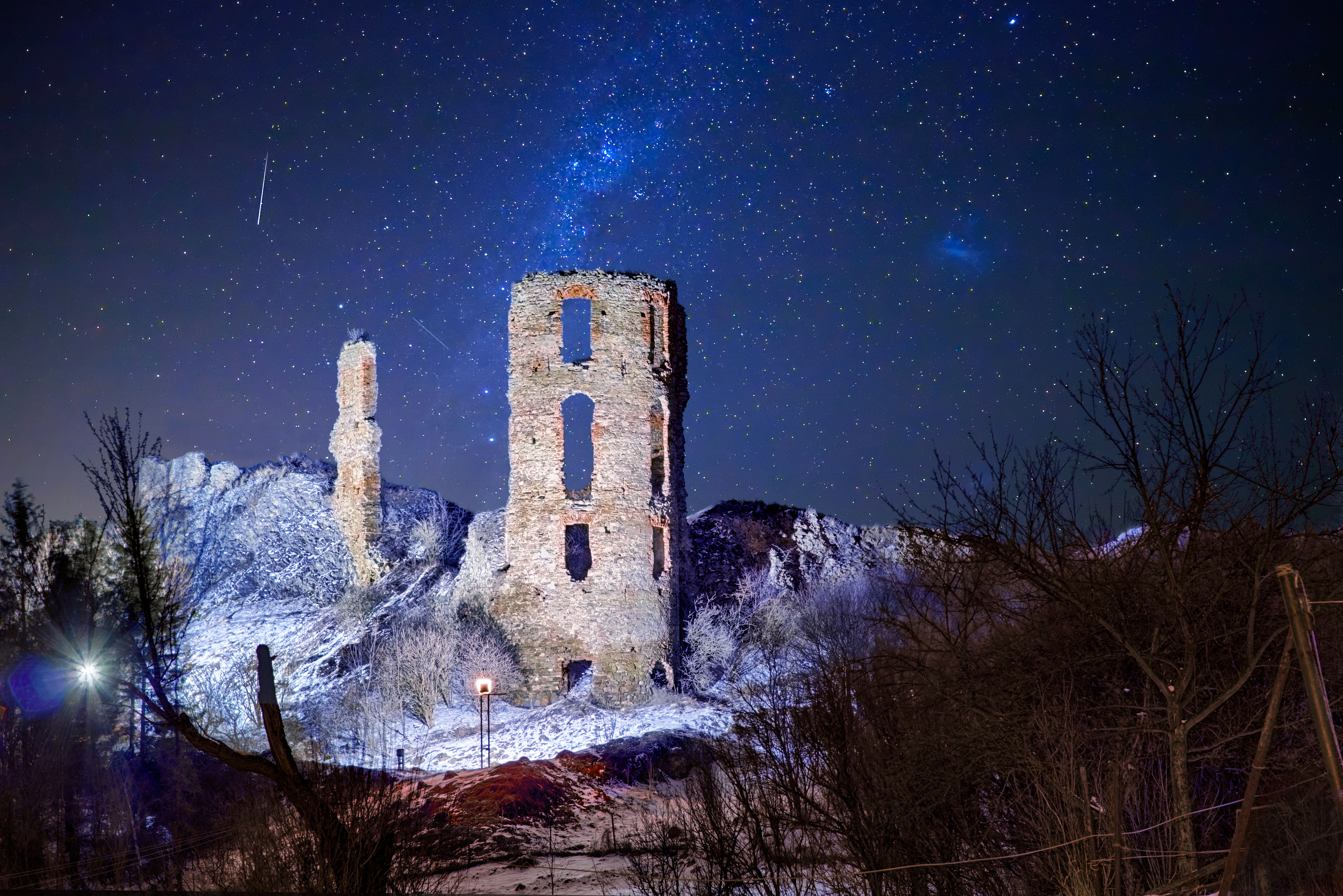
The ruins of Plaveč Castle (Palocsa) in Slovakia

The participants of the diet also decided to offer the crown to another cognatic descendant of the Árpáds, the young Wenceslaus and sent a delegation to his father to Bohemia. John Hont-Pázmány was also a member of that diplomatic mission, along with several barons (for instance, Dominic Rátót and Henry Kőszegi) and bishops. Wenceslaus II met the Hungarian envoys in Hodonín in August and accepted their offer in his eleven-year-old son's name. Wenceslaus II accompanied his son to Székesfehérvár where John Hont-Pázmány crowned the young Wenceslaus king with the Holy Crown on 27 August. The legitimacy of his coronation was also questionable because customary law authorized the Archbishop of Esztergom to perform the ceremony. The new monarch appointed John as chancellor of the royal court. He was also granted the castle of Palocsa (present-day Plaveč, Slovakia) and its accessories by Wenceslaus in September. It is possible that royal charter refers to the monarch's principal advisor Jan Muskata, the Bishop of Kraków, instead of John Hont-Pázmány.

In his letters to Wenceslaus II of Bohemia and Archbishop John of Kalocsa, Pope Boniface VIII emphasized that Wenceslaus had been crowned without the authorization of the Holy See. His legate Niccolo Boccasini, who came to Hungary in September, started negotiations with the Hungarian prelates to convince them to abandon Wenceslaus and support Charles of Anjou's case. Through his envoy, the pope summoned John to the Roman Curia on 17 October 1301, because of his "reckless transgression and foolish act", which referred to his dominant role in the coronation. John was given a deadline of four months to appear before the court, otherwise he will be stripped of his office and the archbishopric of Kalocsa will be declared vacant. However, John Hont-Pázmány died soon or already at the time of sending the letter, sometime between 26 September and 8 November 1301. John died in Buda. He was buried at the local Franciscan church devoted to St. John.

== Sources ==
- C. Tóth, Norbert (2019). Az esztergomi székes- és társaskáptalanok archontológiája 1100–1543 [Archontology of the Cathedral and Collegiate Chapters of Esztergom, 1100–1543] (in Hungarian). Magyar Tudományos Akadémia Magyar Medievisztikai Kutatócsoportja. ISBN 978-963-508-913-0.
- Engel, Pál (1996). Magyarország világi archontológiája, 1301–1457, I. [Secular Archontology of Hungary, 1301–1457, Volume I] (in Hungarian). História, MTA Történettudományi Intézete. ISBN 963-8312-44-0.
- Engel, Pál (2001). The Realm of St Stephen: A History of Medieval Hungary, 895–1526. I.B. Tauris Publishers. ISBN 1-86064-061-3.
- Gerics, József (1987). A korai rendiség Európában és Magyarországon [The Early Society of Estates in Europe and Hungary] (in Hungarian). Akadémiai Kiadó. ISBN 963-05-4218-8.
- Homonnai, Sarolta (2003). "János kalocsai érsek szerepe III. András kormányzatában [The Role of Archbishop John of Kalocsa in the Government of Andrew III]". In Weisz, Boglárka (ed.). Középkortörténti tanulmányok. A III. Medievisztikai PhD-konferencia (Szeged, 2003. május 8–9.) előadásai (in Hungarian). University of Szeged. pp. 33–48. ISBN 978-963-482-664-4.
- Kádár, Tamás (2015). "Harcban a koronáért. I. Károly (Róbert) király uralkodásának első évei 1305 végéig [Fight for the Crown. The First Regnal Years of Charles I (Robert) until the End of 1305]". Történeti Tanulmányok. Acta Universitatis Debreceniensis (in Hungarian). 23: 42–111. ISSN 1217-4602.
- Markó, László (2006). A magyar állam főméltóságai Szent Istvántól napjainkig: Életrajzi Lexikon [Great Officers of State in Hungary from King Saint Stephen to Our Days: A Biographical Encyclopedia] (in Hungarian). Helikon Kiadó. ISBN 963-208-970-7.
- Rudolf, Veronika (2023). Közép-Európa a hosszú 13. században [Central Europe in the Long 13th Century] (in Hungarian). Arpadiana XV., Research Centre for the Humanities. ISBN 978-963-416-406-7.
- Szűcs, Jenő (2002). Az utolsó Árpádok [The Last Árpáds] (in Hungarian). Osiris Kiadó. ISBN 963-389-271-6.
- Udvardy, József (1991). A kalocsai érsekek életrajza (1000–1526) [Biographies of Archbishops of Kalocsa, 1000–1526] (in Hungarian). Görres Gesellschaft.
- Zsoldos, Attila (2003). "III. András". In Szovák, Kornél; Szentpéteri, József; Szakács, Margit (eds.). Szent István és III. András [Saint Stephen and Andrew III] (in Hungarian). Kossuth Kiadó. pp. 119–227. ISBN 963-09-4461-8.
- Zsoldos, Attila (2011). Magyarország világi archontológiája, 1000–1301 [Secular Archontology of Hungary, 1000–1301] (in Hungarian). História, MTA Történettudományi Intézete. ISBN 978-963-9627-38-3.

John Genus Hont-Pázmány Born: c. 1240 Died: September/October 1301
Political offices
Preceded by Andrew	Head of the royal chapel 1276	Succeeded by Thomas
Preceded by Demetrius	Vice-chancellor; 1277	Succeeded by Thomas
Preceded by Thomas	Vice-chancellor; 1278	Succeeded by Nicholas Kán
Preceded by Job Záh	Chancellor; 1278–1279	Succeeded by Thomas
Preceded by Gregory	Chancellor; 1290–1301	Succeeded by Anthony
Catholic Church titles
Preceded by Thomas (elected)	Provost of Székesfehérvár (elected); 1278	Succeeded by Nicholas Kán (elected)
Preceded by Stephen Báncsa	Archbishop of Kalocsa; 1278–1301	Succeeded by Stephen
