= Ivánka III Hont-Pázmány =

Hungarian soldier

Ivánka (III) Hont-Pázmány
- Died: 1299
- Noble family: gens Hont-Pázmány
- Father: Andrew I
- Mother: Maria Nánabeszter

Ivánka (III) from the kindred Hont-Pázmány (Hungarian: Hont-Pázmány nembeli (III.) Ivánka; died 1299) was a Hungarian medieval soldier in the second half of the 13th century.

== Family ==
Ivánka (III) was born into the Forgács branch of the wealthy and prestigious gens (clan) Hont-Pázmány. Ivánka was referred to as "young" in 1291, thus he was born in the late 1260s or early 1270s. His father was Andrew (I), a faithful confidant of King Béla IV. His mother was Maria Nánabeszter. Ivánka had several siblings, John and Thomas (III) entered ecclesiastical and court career, respectively, while the other brothers – Andrew (II), the ancestor of the Forgách family, and Nicholas (I) supported their political orientation with military service. They also had two sisters, including Yolanda.

== Military service ==
Ivánka and his brothers were considered strong supporters of Andrew III of Hungary, who ascended the Hungarian throne in 1290. Ivánka participated in the royal campaign against Duke Albert of Austria in the summer of 1291. The peace treaty prescribed the destruction of the fortresses that Albert of Austria had seized from the rebellious Kőszegis. As a result, the Kőszegis rose up in open rebellion against Andrew in spring 1292. Ivánka fought against them and the royal troops subdued the rebellion by July 1292. However, King Andrew III and his escort, including Ivánka, were captured and imprisoned by Ivan Kőszegi during their journey to Slavonia for a brief time in August 1292. The Hont-Pázmány clan involved in resolving the crisis and was among those loyal barons and nobles who offered their relatives or familiares as hostages to Ivan in order to liberate Andrew III. Demonstrating his loyalty, Ivánka remained in the castle of Ivan Kőszegi, where he was held captive for a year, while the king regained his freedom. After his release, King Andrew donated uninhabited lands – Tarány (Štefanovičová) and Kucha – in Nyitra County to Ivánka for his merits in February 1294.

The Hont-Pázmány brothers jointly owned the lordship of Gímes Castle (near present-day Jelenec, Slovakia) and the surrounding landholdings and villages in Nyitra and Bars counties. The four brothers – Thomas, Andrew, Ivánka and Nicholas – divided the lordship of Gímes among themselves in January 1295. Ivánka also owned Szencse (Podhájska) and was involved in lawsuit with his neighbors over its borders. These lands became important, when the neighboring powerful lord Matthew Csák, who possessed and ruled contiguous lands in the north-western counties, turned against Andrew III at the end of 1297. The younger brothers Andrew, Ivánka and Nicholas picked fight against the rebellious baron, also representing the monarch's interests, who excused them from all the damage caused to the Csák brothers, Matthew and Csák, and their familiares. After a one-year effective ceasefire, the conflict has recurred between Andrew III and Matthew Csák by the second half of 1299. Following a failed royal campaign led by Demetrius Balassa against the Csák territory, the oligarch's troops invaded the central parts of Upper Hungary. According to a later 14th-century source, Andrew and Ivánka were killed in the skirmish.

== Sources ==
- Bártfai Szabó, László (1910). A Hunt-Paznan nemzetségbeli Forgách család története [The History of The Forgách Family from the Kindred Hunt-Paznan] (in Hungarian). Buzárovits Gusztáv Könyvnyomdája.
- Zsoldos, Attila (2003). "III. András". In Szovák, Kornél; Szentpéteri, József; Szakács, Margit (eds.). Szent István és III. András [Saint Stephen and Andrew III] (in Hungarian). Kossuth Kiadó. pp. 119–227. ISBN 963-09-4461-8.
