= Andrew I Hont-Pázmány =

Hungarian lord

Andrew (I) Hont-Pázmány
- Lord of Gímes

Count of the Tárnoks
- Reign: 1249–1256
- Predecessor: Michael (?)
- Successor: Gilét Smaragd
- Born: c. 1210
- Died: after 1277
- Noble family: gens Hont-Pázmány
- Spouse: Maria Nánabeszter
- Issue: John; Thomas III; Andrew II; Ivánka III; Nicholas I Yolanda a daughter
- Father: Ivánka I

Andrew (I) from the kindred Hont-Pázmány (Hungarian: Hont-Pázmány nembeli (I.) András; died after 1277) was a Hungarian lord in the 13th century. He was a staunch supporter of King Béla IV of Hungary.

== Early life ==
Andrew (I) was born into the Forgács branch of the wealthy and prestigious gens (clan) Hont-Pázmány in the 1210s. His father was comes Ivánka (I), the first reliably known member of the branch, who plausibly participated in the royal campaigns against the Principality of Halych during the reign of Andrew II of Hungary. According to a non-authentic charter with the date 1226, Ivánka was a son of a certain Ivancs (Iwanch). Beside that, his name appeared in a sole document only, in 1229, when shared his inherited estate of Szelepcsény (present-day Slepčany, Slovakia) with his relatives. Andrew had a brother Thomas (II). Both of them spent their childhood in the royal court, according to a charter of Béla IV in 1249.

Thomas and Andrew participated in the disastrous Battle of Mohi on 11 April 1241, when the invading Mongols destroyed the Hungarian royal army. Béla IV narrated the Hont-Pázmány brothers' actions in his charter in 1253. Accordingly, when the monarch fled the battlefield, Andrew handed over his nimble and full-strength horse to Béla IV, lagging behind on foot, turning to the pursuers. While Thomas was killed in the site, Andrew managed to survive and went into hiding.

== Career ==
Béla IV returned to Hungary after the withdrawal of the Mongols in 1242. After Béla abandoned the ancient royal prerogative to build and own castles in response to the Mongol invasion, Andrew erected a small fort of Turóc Castle by 1243 (also known as Znió or Zniev, present-day near Kláštor pod Znievom, Slovakia). During the subsequent wars with the Duchy of Austria and the Republic of Venice, Andrew was entrusted to protect and guard the king's four-year-old firstborn son and heir Duke Stephen in Turóc in the winter of 1243. The castle itself was assigned to the royal forest of Zólyom and later became seat of the emerging Turóc County.

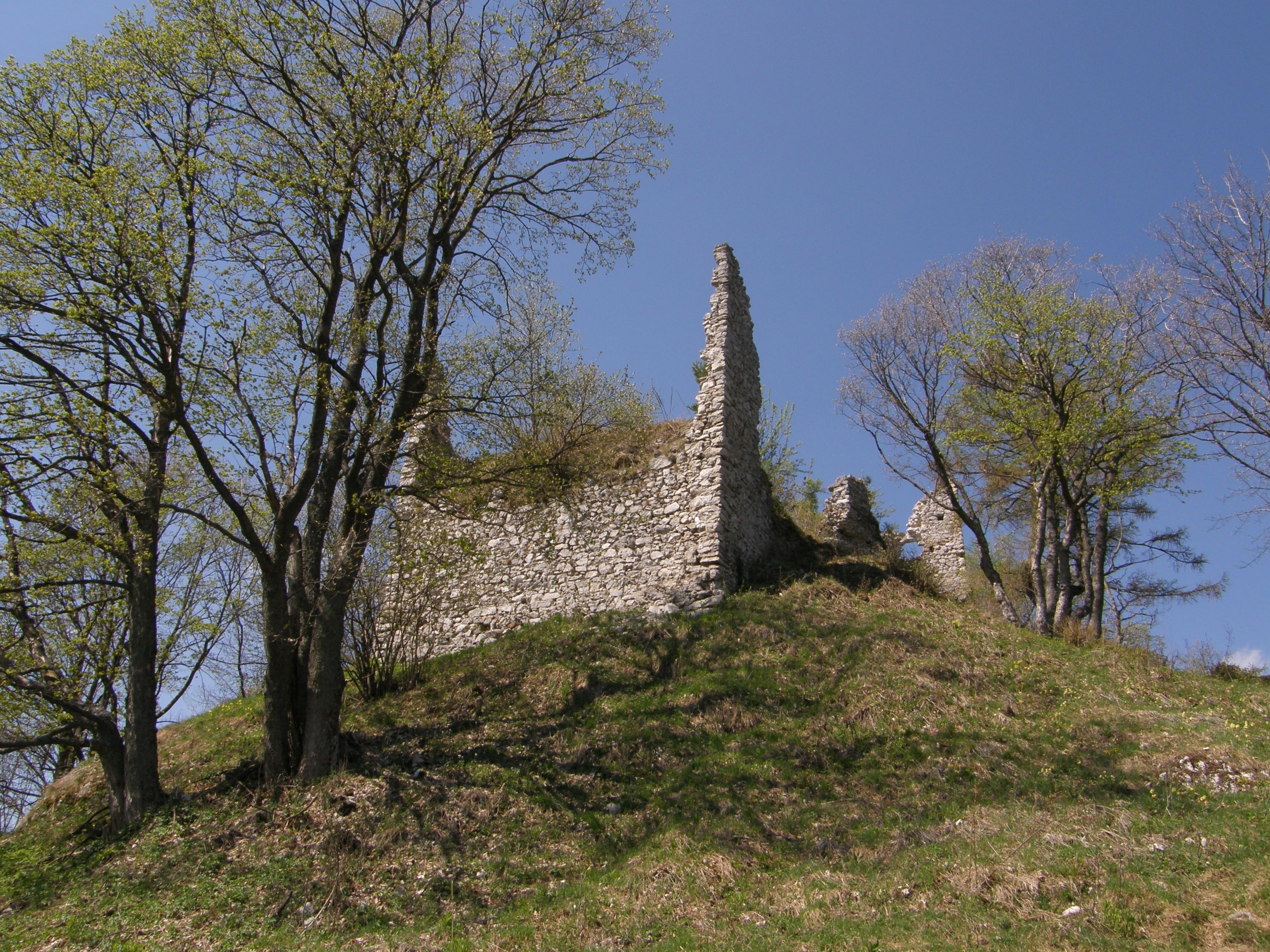
Zniev Castle (Znió or Turóc) in Slovakia, erected by Andrew Hont-Pázmány around 1243

Throughout the 1240s, Andrew were granted several lands in Nyitra County, which became the basis of the family lordship, which had developed in the region between the rivers Nyitra (Nitra) and Zsitva (Žitava) in the upcoming decades. Through royal land donations, Andrew acquired Gyarak (Kmeťovo) in 1247 and a significant portion in Mánya (Maňa) in 1249. By the second half of the decade, he erected his main stronghold in the ancient family estate, Gímes Castle (today Gýmeš, ruins near Jelenec, Slovakia). It became one of the most important forts in the westernmost part of Upper Hungary. Since the 1250s, Andrew gradually expanded the Gímes lordship with acquiring the surrounding villages and accessories (forests, meadows etc.). He bought portions in Szencse (Podhájska), Kishind (Malé Chyndice), Nagyhind (Veľké Chyndice), Barc, Vásárfalu (today part of Komjatice) and Belad (Beladice). In addition to the royal donations, he also bought several portions in the aforementioned villages in order to expand his coherent lordship. His brother-in-law Demetrius Nánabeszter bequeathed the land Teremecs (present-day Chrenová, a borough of Nitra in Slovakia) to Andrew in his last will and testament.

Andrew Hont-Pázmány served as count of tárnoks (royal financial officials) from around 1249 to 1256. Former historiography incorrectly claimed that he held the dignity of Master of the treasury. As a royal bailiff (pristaldus), Andrew inducted the provostry of Turóc to the ownership of royally donated lands in Nyitra County in 1252. The provostry was established by Béla IV in the previous year. With the title of magister, Andrew was tutor of King Béla IV's younger son, the approximately seven-year-old Duke Béla in 1256. Andrew was styled as ispán of Bánya (Árkibánya) ispánate on several occasions in the upcoming decaded (1258, 1262–1273, 1274, 1275), which laid as a border castle region in the territory of Nyitra County.

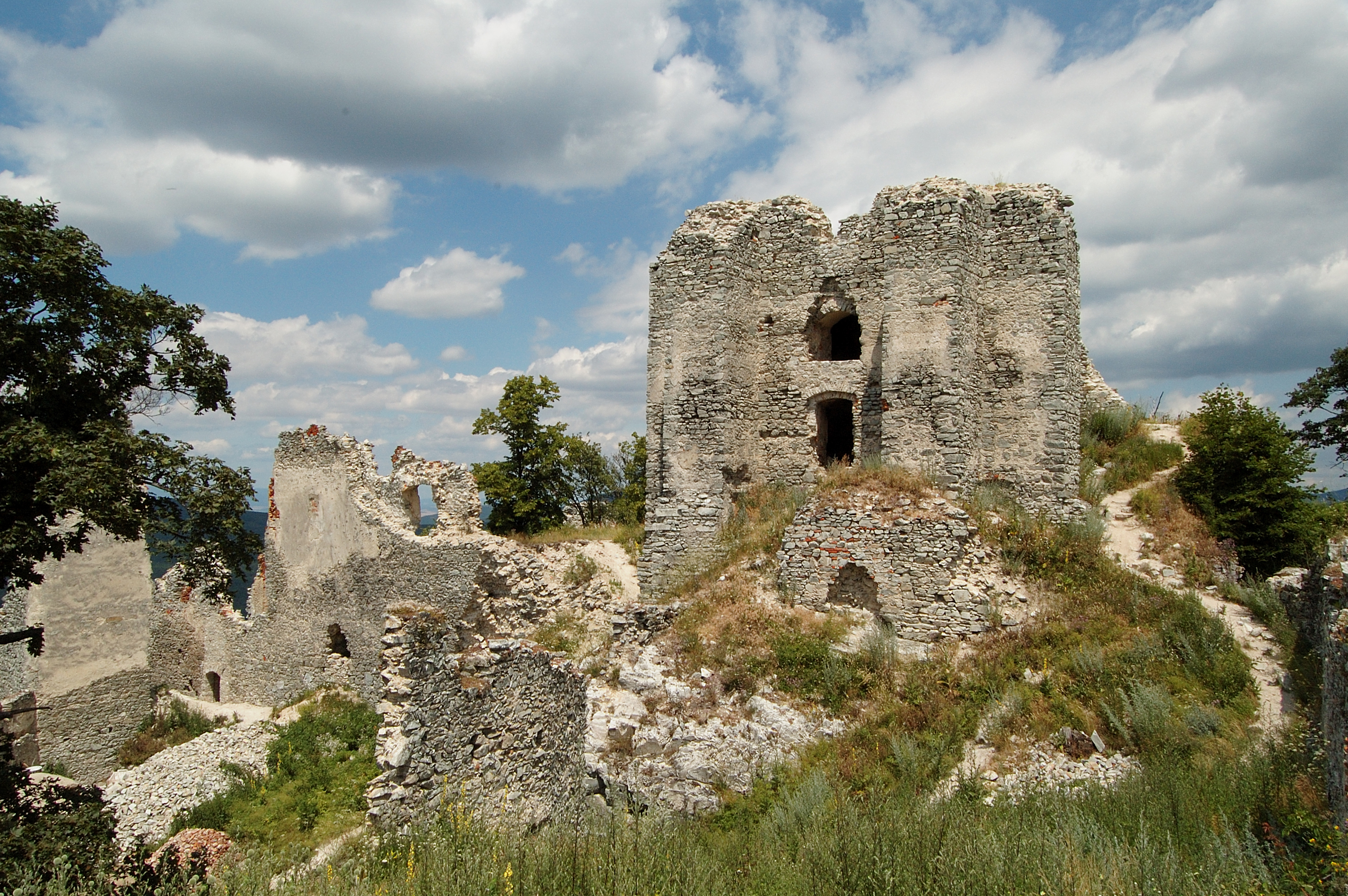
Gýmeš (Gímes) Castle near present-day Jelenec, Slovakia, built by Andrew Hont-Pázmány

During the civil war (1264–1265) between Béla IV and his son junior king Stephen, Andrew remained a partisan of the elderly monarch, but also tried to balance between the two parties, because he maintained good relationship with the entire Árpád dynasty. However, when Béla's daughter Duchess Anna and the royal general Henry Kőszegi occupied the fort of Patak (ruin near Sátoraljaújhely) and captured Stephen's wife, Elizabeth the Cuman and children, including the future Ladislaus IV in August 1264, Andrew sank into a delicate position. Stephen's family – Queen Elizabeth, their son and four daughters – were transferred to Turóc Castle under the guard of Andrew upon the order of Duchess Anna who most fervently opposed his brother's aspirations. Considering Duke Stephen's future plausible ascension to the Hungarian throne, Andrew did not keep his family under strict custody. For instance, he borrowed 100 silver marks to Elizabeth during her captivity and allowed the duke's courier Emeric Nádasd to inform Stephen in the shortest possible time about the fall of Patak and capture of his family. As a result, Andrew remained a confidant of Béla IV and Stephen too. Later Queen Elizabeth remembered Andrew's loyalty with a warm heart. Two months later, Stephen's family – or only the two-year-old Ladislaus – was sent to the court of Boleslaw the Chaste, Duke of Cracow, who was Béla IV's son-in-law.

Andrew retained his position of ispán of Bánya during the reigns of Stephen V and Ladislaus IV too. In the year of 1273, Ottokar II of Bohemia invaded the northern borderlands of Hungary. The Bohemian army captured, for instance, Nyitra (Nitra), Győr and Szombathely, plundering the western counties. Andrew and his sons successfully defended their castle of Gímes in August 1273, which was besieged by Ottokar's troops after a capture of several other forts and settlements in the region. Following that Andrew and his familiares joined the united army led by Joachim Gutkeled, which successfully recaptured Győr and Szombathely.

== Personal life ==
Andrew had five sons and two daughters from his marriage with Maria Nánabeszter. The two eldest sons, John and Thomas (III) rose to prominence during the last decades of the 13th century. John entered ecclesiastical career and served as Archbishop of Kalocsa from 1278 to 1301. Thomas was a powerful lord, who held several dignities. Thomas and John closely cooperated with each other during the reign of Andrew III in the 1290s. Another sons were Andrew (II) and Ivánka (III) were skilled soldiers and served faithfully King Andrew III in his campaigns against the oligarchs. Both of them were killed in battles against the powerful rebellious lord Matthew III Csák. Andrew was ancestor of the Forgács (or Forgách) noble family, which still exists and provided several magnates for the Hungarian elite in the following centuries. The youngest son was Nicholas (I), mentioned between 1295 and 1297. Andrew's two daughters were Yolanda and an unidentified one, who married Atyócs of Zólyom and Peter Szikszói, respectively.

Andrew was involved in a lawsuit with his sister-in-law, the widow of Thomas over her morning-gift in 1244. Andrew paid 15 silver marks to her. Andrew was last mentioned as a living person in 1277, when traveled to Buda for the dowry of his daughter Yolanda, who was widowed by then. Andrew died sometime after that. The four sons – Thomas, Andrew, Ivánka and Nicholas – divided the lordship of Gímes among themselves in January 1295.

== Sources ==
- Bártfai Szabó, László (1910). A Hunt-Paznan nemzetségbeli Forgách család története [The History of The Forgách Family from the Kindred Hunt-Paznan] (in Hungarian). Buzárovits Gusztáv Könyvnyomdája.
- Markó, László (2006). A magyar állam főméltóságai Szent Istvántól napjainkig: Életrajzi Lexikon [Great Officers of State in Hungary from King Saint Stephen to Our Days: A Biographical Encyclopedia] (in Hungarian). Helikon Kiadó. ISBN 963-208-970-7.
- Szűcs, Jenő (2002). Az utolsó Árpádok [The Last Árpáds] (in Hungarian). Osiris Kiadó. ISBN 963-389-271-6.
- Zsoldos, Attila (2007). Családi ügy: IV. Béla és István ifjabb király viszálya az 1260-as években [A family affair: The Conflict between Béla IV and Junior King Stephen in the 1260s] (in Hungarian). História, MTA Történettudományi Intézete. ISBN 978-963-9627-15-4.
- Zsoldos, Attila (2011). Magyarország világi archontológiája, 1000–1301 [Secular Archontology of Hungary, 1000–1301] (in Hungarian). História, MTA Történettudományi Intézete. ISBN 978-963-9627-38-3.
