= Andrew II Hont-Pázmány =

Hungarian soldier

Andrew (II) Hont-Pázmány

Vice-ispán of Árva
- Reign: 1291
- Died: 1299
- Noble family: gens Hont-Pázmány
- Issue: Nicholas II ("Forgács"); Andrew III
- Father: Andrew I
- Mother: Maria Nánabeszter

Andrew (II) from the kindred Hont-Pázmány (Hungarian: Hont-Pázmány nembeli (II.) András; died 1299) was a Hungarian medieval soldier in the second half of the 13th century. He was the progenitor of the influential Forgách family.

== Family ==
Andrew (II) was born into the Forgács branch of the wealthy and prestigious gens (clan) Hont-Pázmány. His father was Andrew (I), a faithful confidant of King Béla IV. His mother was Maria Nánabeszter. Andrew had several siblings, John and Thomas (III) entered ecclesiastical and court career, respectively, while the younger brothers – Ivánka (III) and Nicholas (I) supported their political orientation with military service. They also had two sisters, including Yolanda.

Andrew had two sons from the marriage with his unidentified wife: Nicholas (II) and Andrew (III). Nicholas became the first member of the Forgách noble family, which adopted his nickname ("Forgács") and flourished until the 20th century. Surviving branches still exists today. The other son, Andrew (III) also had two sons, Nicholas (III) and John "the Sharp", but they died before the end of the 14th century without known issues.

== Military service ==
Andrew served Ladislaus IV of Hungary faithfully as a courtly knight. For instance, he participated in the Battle on the Marchfeld in 1278. For his service, he was granted the villages of Vajk (present-day Lúčnica nad Žitavou, Slovakia) and Herestény by Ladislaus in March 1287.

When Andrew III of Hungary ascended the Hungarian throne in 1290, the Hont-Pázmány clan – including Andrew and his brothers – became one of the strongest pillars of his reign, which was characterized by constant rebellions against the royal authority. Andrew functioned as vice-ispán of Árva (Latin: comes de Aryna) in 1291, which then belonged to the royal forest of Zólyom. This is the first mention of an existing administrative division called Árva, which later became a separate county after the disintegration of the extensive Zólyom by the mid-14th century. The Hont-Pázmány brothers jointly owned the lordship of Gímes Castle (near present-day Jelenec, Slovakia) and the surrounding landholdings and villages in Nyitra and Bars counties. The four brothers – Thomas, Andrew, Ivánka and Nicholas – divided the lordship of Gímes among themselves in January 1295.

These lands became important, when the neighboring powerful lord Matthew Csák, who possessed and ruled contiguous lands in the north-western counties, turned against Andrew at the end of 1297. The younger brothers Andrew, Ivánka and Nicholas picked fight against the rebellious baron, also representing the monarch's interests, who excused them from all the damage caused to the Csák brothers, Matthew and Csák, and their familiares. After a one-year effective ceasefire, the conflict has recurred between Andrew III and Matthew Csák by the second half of 1299. Following a failed royal campaign led by Demetrius Balassa against the Csák territory, the oligarch's troops invaded the central parts of Upper Hungary. According to a later 14th-century source, Andrew and Ivánka were killed in the skirmish.

== Sources ==
- Bártfai Szabó, László (1910). A Hunt-Paznan nemzetségbeli Forgách család története [The History of The Forgách Family from the Kindred Hunt-Paznan] (in Hungarian). Buzárovits Gusztáv Könyvnyomdája.
- Zsoldos, Attila (2003). "III. András". In Szovák, Kornél; Szentpéteri, József; Szakács, Margit (eds.). Szent István és III. András [Saint Stephen and Andrew III] (in Hungarian). Kossuth Kiadó. pp. 119–227. ISBN 963-09-4461-8.
- Zsoldos, Attila (2011). Magyarország világi archontológiája, 1000–1301 [Secular Archontology of Hungary, 1000–1301] (in Hungarian). História, MTA Történettudományi Intézete. ISBN 978-963-9627-38-3.
