= Thomas III Hont-Pázmány =

Hungarian lord

Thomas (III) Hont-Pázmány

Judge royal
- Reign: 1275; 1291–1293
- Predecessor: Denis Péc (1st term); Amadeus Aba (2nd term)
- Successor: Nicholas Geregye (1st term); Apor Péc (2nd term)
- Died: after 1303
- Noble family: gens Hont-Pázmány
- Father: Andrew I
- Mother: Maria Nánabeszter

Thomas (III) from the kindred Hont-Pázmány (Hungarian: Hont-Pázmány nembeli (III.) Tamás; died after 1303) was a Hungarian influential lord in the second half of the 13th century, who served as Judge royal in 1275 and from 1291 to 1293. He was a strong confidant of Andrew III of Hungary.

== Family ==
Thomas (III) was born into the Forgács branch of the wealthy and prestigious gens (clan) Hont-Pázmány in the 1240s. His father was Andrew (I), who erected castles near Turóc and Gímes (present-day Kláštor pod Znievom and Jelenec in Slovakia, respectively) following the First Mongol invasion of Hungary. He was a faithful confidant of Béla IV, then Stephen V. Andrew served as count of the tárnoks (financial officials) from 1249 to 1256, and ispán of Bánya (Árkibánya) ispánate on several occasions, which laid in the territory of Nyitra County. His mother was Maria Nánabeszter.

Thomas had several siblings, who also rose to prominence during the last decades of the 13th century. The most influential was John, who entered ecclesiastical career and served as Archbishop of Kalocsa from 1278 to 1301. Thomas and John closely cooperated with each other during the reign of Andrew III in the 1290s. His another brothers, Andrew (II) and Ivánka (III) were skilled soldiers and served faithfully King Andrew III in his campaigns against the oligarchs. Both of them were killed in battles against the powerful rebellious lord Matthew III Csák. Through his elder son, Andrew was ancestor of the Forgács (or Forgách) noble family, which still exists and provided several magnates for the Hungarian elite in the following centuries. Thomas' youngest brother was Nicholas, who was mentioned between 1295 and 1297. He also had two sisters, Yolanda and an unidentified one, who married Atyócs of Zólyom and Peter Szikszói, respectively. The four brothers – Thomas, Andrew, Ivánka and Nicholas – divided the lordship of Gímes among themselves in January 1295. Thomas had neither known wife nor descendants.

== Early career ==
His father Andrew was still alive and played an active role in the early 1270s, when Thomas was first mentioned by contemporary records in 1273. In that year, Ottokar II of Bohemia invaded the northern borderlands of Hungary. Thomas participated in the battle at Laa in August, where the Hungarians defeated the Bohemian army. Thomas seriously injured during the skirmish. Despite that he marched into Upper Hungary in order to provide assistance to his elderly father Andrew, whose castle of Gímes was besieged by Ottokar's another army after a capture of several other forts and settlements in the region. Andrew and his sons, including Thomas successfully defended their residence in August 1273. Thereafter, they participated in the recapture of Győr.

During that time, the child Ladislaus IV ruled the kingdom; during his minority, many groupings of barons — primarily the Csáks, Kőszegis, and Gutkeleds — fought against each other for supreme power. Thomas Hont-Pázmány allied with the Csák brothers Matthew II and Peter I due to geographical proximity and kinship. Following the Battle of Föveny, when the Csáks and their allies gained influence over the royal council, Thomas served as Judge royal from March to June 1275. Beside that, he was also ispán of Pozsony County and Sempte ispánate, which laid in Nyitra County. Thomas was replaced as Judge royal by Nicholas Geregye in June, when the Kőszegis regained power around that time. On the occasion of a subsequent course change, Thomas was made Ban of Slavonia by the autumn of 1275. He held the dignity until June 1276, when the Gutkeleds and Kőszegis again removed their opponents from power at the national diet after Peter Csák's brutal and bloody attack against the Diocese of Veszprém. Thomas served as ispán of Nyitra and Pozsony counties from around August 1276 to November 1277. Beside that he was also referred to as ispán of Komárom County between April and November 1277. He was styled as count of the tárnoks in November 1277. Some historians, including Attila Zsoldos attributed Thomas' 1270s career to his namesake relative, Thomas, son of Achilles from the Hont-Pázmány clan's Szentgyörgy branch. Pál Engel considered the careers in 1270s and 1290s belonged to one person, Thomas from the Forgács branch.

== Royal councillor ==
Thomas Hont-Pázmány lost political positions for the remaining part of the reign of Ladislaus IV. His brother John and the other prelates became staunch opponents of the king after the intervention of the Holy See regarding the baptism of the pagan Cumans. Following the death of his father sometime after 1277, Thomas became Lord of Gímes. He acquired large-scale landholdings and estates in the region between the rivers Nyitra (Nitra) and Zsitva (Žitava) in the 1280s, when retired to his residence in order to establish his lordship. His family, the Forgács branch owned significant portions of Nyitra and Bars counties in the westernmost part of the Kingdom of Hungary.

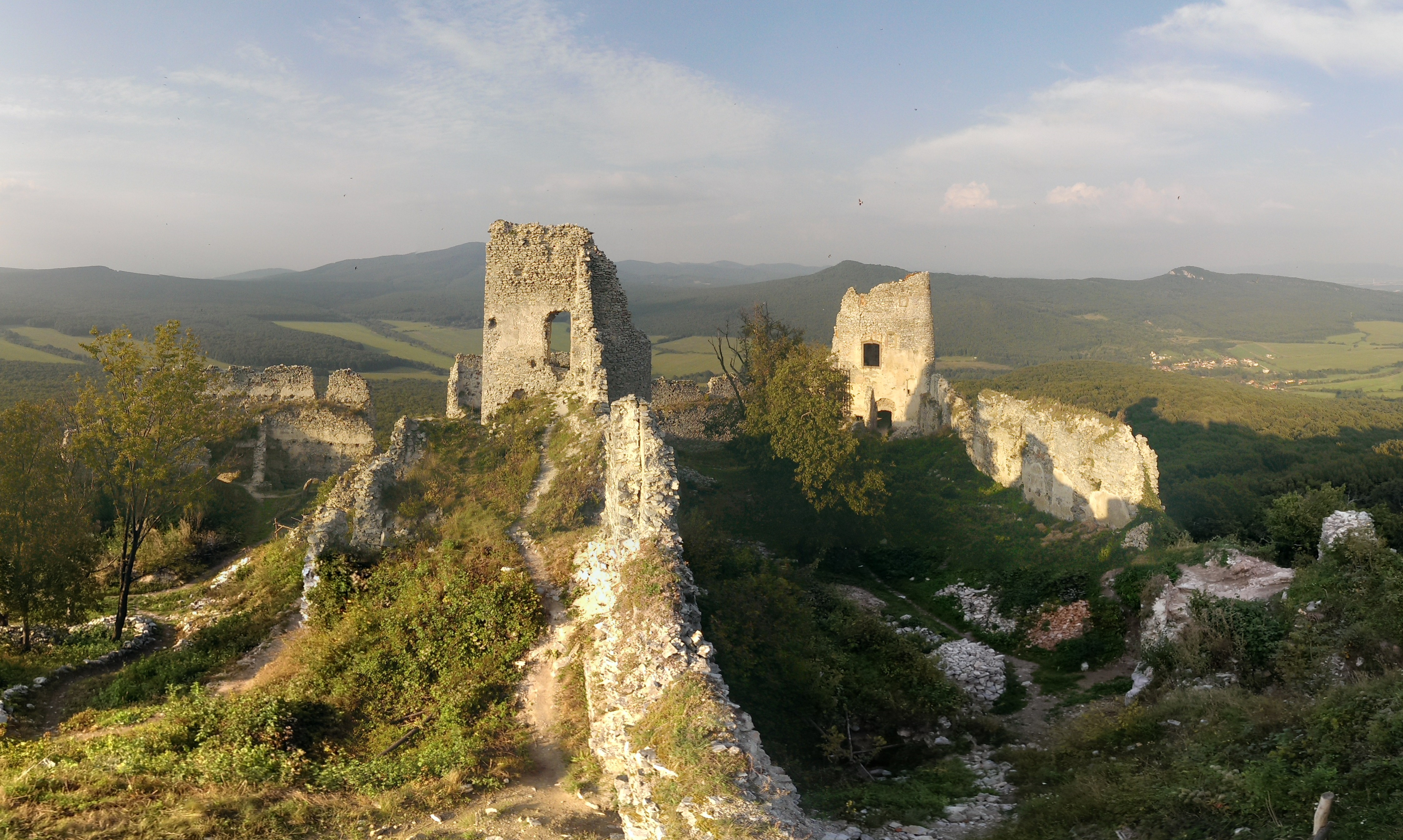
The ruins of the Gýmeš Castle, near present-day Jelenec, Slovakia

Thomas returned to the political sphere in the early 1290s, when Andrew III of Hungary ascended the throne. Under his reign, the Hungarian prelates – including John Hont-Pázmány as royal chancellor – became the strongest pillars of the royal power against the semi-independent oligarchic domains, which threatened the national sovereignty. Both Thomas and John were considered staunch partisans of Andrew III, whose whole reign were characterized by constant rebellions against his rule from a part of the Kőszegis and others. Thomas functioned as Judge royal from February 1291 to February 1293. He was replaced by Apor Péc. Following that, Thomas was made Master of the horse. He held the dignity for a short time until around October 1293, when he was succeeded by the emerging powerful baron Matthew III Csák (son of the late Peter I Csák, Thomas' former ally). Thomas served as ispán of Bars and Nyitra counties at least since January 1295, presumably replacing Gregory Péc. He held both offices throughout the reign of Andrew III. These functions became prominent, when Matthew Csák, who possessed and ruled contiguous lands in the north-western counties, turned against Andrew at the end of 1297. This personally affected Thomas and his family, because their branch's landholdings laid in the region (Nyitra, Bars and Esztergom counties), in the neighborhood of the aggressively expanding lord's territory. The Hont-Pázmány brothers Andrew, Ivánka and Nicholas picked fight against the rebellious baron. The royal campaign recaptured Pozsony County, but Matthew Csák managed to preserve his authority over the other counties. Gímes Castle under the command of Thomas became an important royal stronghold against the oligarchic provinces in Upper Hungary. As ispán of Nyitra ans Bars, King Andrew III commissioned him to isolate Matthew Csák's realm from the southeast and to protect Pozsony and Zólyom counties from his expansionist raids. Around the same time, other pro-Andrew lords, who owned significant estates in the region, for instance Demetrius Balassa, Stephen Ákos, Dominic Rátót and Paul Szécs were given a similar task, isolating the dominions of Matthew Csák and the Kőszegi family from royal territories and each other too.

In early 1298, John Hont-Pázmány became head of the royal council and de facto the most powerful prelate of the kingdom, after Gregory Bicskei supported the claim of the pretender Charles of Anjou. John and his fellow bishops initiated the convocation of the 1298 national diet, which excluded the participation of Andrew III and the barons of the realm. One of the (23rd) articles of the 1298 diet established a four-member lesser council within the royal council, consisting of two nobles (representatives of the "nobility with uniform status") and two prelates (suffragans each belonging to the archdioceses of Esztergom and Kalocsa) with a three-month term. One of the noble councilors was Thomas Hont-Pázmány, Archbishop John's brother, despite his magnate of origin, which reflects the influence of their clan over the royal court. Their veto power prevented Bicskei from sabotaging the operation of the royal council, which resulted his total isolation in the state government, despite his nominal leading position in the royal council. John and the prelates had a virtually exclusive right to elect the four council members; both Thomas Hont-Pázmány and Henry Balog were considered supporters of the Hungarian clergy. Thomas and Henry were first identified as royal councillors (Latin: consiliarii) in February 1299, when Dominic Rátót exchanged his estates with Julius Sártványvecse in their presence. Throughout in 1299 and 1300, Thomas acted as co-judge beside the monarch in various lawsuits. According to historian József Gerics, the 1298 national diet, which made the laws against the supremacy of barons (i.e. oligarchs), declared the baron Thomas as "nobilis" (i.e. lesser noble) in order to become a member of the small council. During his acts as councillor, he was referred to as "noble", while other documents (for instance, royal charters) still styled him as "baron" ("baronus"). Consequently, the gain of power by the lesser nobility remained only nominal; establishment of the four-member small council with veto power and Thomas' appointment to this body served only the purpose of artificially changing the balance of power in the royal council in favor of the clergy led by John Hont-Pázmány. With his veto power, Thomas was able to thwart the decisions of the other barons and even the king.

By April 1299, in addition to his role in the royal council, Thomas also became a "baron" of Andrew's spouse, Queen Agnes of Austria, in accordance with the 24th article of the 1298 diet, which authorized Andrew III to appoint barons for the administration of the queenly court. It is presumable that Thomas was present at the 1298 national diet (despite the "exclusion" of the barons), and both positions were tailored for exclusively his person by his brother John and his suffragans. The king' confidence in the Hungarian clergy was shaken due to the subsequent pro-prelate resolutions of the 1298 diet, as a result he shortly entered into a formal alliance with five influential barons, Amadeus Aba and the four above mentioned pro-royal lords, who stated that they were willing to support him against his enemy and even the bishops, i.e. Andrew III did not want to rely solely on the bishops during his reign. Despite that the loyalty of Thomas was relentless. The conflict has recurred between Andrew III and Matthew Csák by the second half of 1299. Following a failed royal campaign led by Demetrius Balassa against the Csák territory, the oligarch's troops invaded the central parts of Upper Hungary. Thomas and Archbishop John's brothers Andrew and Ivánka were killed in the skirmish.

== Later life ==
Andrew III of Hungary died on 14 January 1301, leaving no male heirs. He was the last male member of the Árpád dynasty. Thomas Hont-Pázmány was present at his deathbed, alongside others lords of the royal court, including Dominic Rátót, Roland Borsa and Paul Szécs. He appeared as a witness in the charter of Queen Agnes, who handed over the royal castle of Óbuda on the next day, 15 January. Thomas was referred to as ispán of Nyitra and Bars counties in the document. On hearing Andrew's death, Charles of Anjou hurried to Esztergom where Gregory Bicskei crowned him king in the spring of 1301. However, majority of the prelates and barons, including John and Thomas-Hont-Pázmány did not recognize his legitimacy. Another pretender, Wenceslaus of Bohemia was crowned king by John Hont-Pázmány in August 1301. Thomas was referred to as "baron" of Wenceslaus in 1303. He did not play a role in the subsequent events of the era called Interregnum. He died sometime after 1303. In the first decade of the 14th century, Matthew Csák rapidly extended his influence over the whole Northwest Hungary, including the Hont-Pázmány lands. The oligarch also captured the castle of Gímes, during or after Thomas' lifetime.

== Sources ==
- Engel, Pál (1996). Magyarország világi archontológiája, 1301–1457, I. [Secular Archontology of Hungary, 1301–1457, Volume I] (in Hungarian). História, MTA Történettudományi Intézete. ISBN 963-8312-44-0.
- Gerics, József (1987). A korai rendiség Európában és Magyarországon [The Early Society of Estates in Europe and Hungary] (in Hungarian). Akadémiai Kiadó. ISBN 963-05-4218-8.
- Kádár, Tamás (2015). "Harcban a koronáért. I. Károly (Róbert) király uralkodásának első évei 1305 végéig [Fight for the Crown. The First Regnal Years of Charles I (Robert) until the End of 1305]". Történeti Tanulmányok. Acta Universitatis Debreceniensis (in Hungarian). 23: 42–111. ISSN 1217-4602.
- Markó, László (2006). A magyar állam főméltóságai Szent Istvántól napjainkig: Életrajzi Lexikon [Great Officers of State in Hungary from King Saint Stephen to Our Days: A Biographical Encyclopedia] (in Hungarian). Helikon Kiadó. ISBN 963-208-970-7.
- Szűcs, Jenő (2002). Az utolsó Árpádok [The Last Árpáds] (in Hungarian). Osiris Kiadó. ISBN 963-389-271-6.
- Zsoldos, Attila (2003). "III. András". In Szovák, Kornél; Szentpéteri, József; Szakács, Margit (eds.). Szent István és III. András [Saint Stephen and Andrew III] (in Hungarian). Kossuth Kiadó. pp. 119–227. ISBN 963-09-4461-8.
- Zsoldos, Attila (2011). Magyarország világi archontológiája, 1000–1301 [Secular Archontology of Hungary, 1000–1301] (in Hungarian). História, MTA Történettudományi Intézete. ISBN 978-963-9627-38-3.

Thomas Genus Hont-Pázmány Born: c. 1240 Died: after 1303
Political offices
Preceded by Denis Péc	Judge royal 1275	Succeeded by Nicholas Geregye
Preceded by Ivan Kőszegi	Ban of Slavonia; 1275–1276	Succeeded by Joachim Gutkeled
Preceded by Amadeus Aba	Judge royal 1291–1293	Succeeded by Apor Péc
Preceded by Mikó Szécs	Master of the horse 1293	Succeeded by Matthew Csák
