= Hont-Pázmány =

Clan in the Kingdom of Hungary

Genus (gens) Hont-Pázmány
- Country: Kingdom of Hungary
- Founded: c. 983
- Founder: Hont and Pázmány
- Estates: Hont County, Esztergom County
- Cadet branches: House of Bozóky; House of Bényi; House of Csalomjai; House of Födémási; House of Forgách; House of Szegi; House of Garadnai-Pogány; House of Szentgyörgyi; House of Czibak; House of Ujhelyi; House of Pázmány; House of Besztercei

Hont-Pázmány (Hunt-Patzmann) was the name of a gens ("clan") in the Kingdom of Hungary. The Gesta Hunnorum et Hungarorum mentions that the ancestors of the family, the brothers Hont (Hunt) and Pázmány (Pazman), originally from the Duchy of Swabia in the Holy Roman Empire, arrived in the late 10th century to the court of Grand Prince Géza of the Magyars:

The next arrivals were Hunt and Pazman, two half-brothers, courageous knights of Swabian origin. These two and their retainers had been journeying through Hungary with the intention of passing over the sea when they were detained by Duke Géza, and finally they girded King Stephen with the sword of knighthood at the river Hron, after the German custom.

== Notable members of the clan ==
The first notable members of the clan were the brothers Hont and Pázmány who assisted Géza's son, the future King Stephen I of Hungary against his relative, the pagan Koppány who claimed for Géza's inheritance. The deed of foundation of the Pannonhalma Archabbey (issued in 1001) referred to both brothers as the king's military leaders (duces). The brothers were granted possessions on the north-western parts of the kingdom (primarily in present-day Slovakia). Hont County was named after one of them.

Lampert (?–1132) founded the Abbey of Bozók. His first wife was the sister of King Ladislaus I of Hungary. He held about 30 possessions and thus he was one of the wealthiest landowners of the kingdom. In 1124, he took part in the campaign of King Stephen II of Hungary against Dalmatia. Lampert was murdered by the followers of King Béla II the Blind, because he was suspected of supporting Boris Kalamanos's claim to the throne.

Around 1201, Martin (?–1236/1245) held the office of count (comes) at the court of the future King Andrew II of Hungary, and served as the Ban of Croatia and Dalmatia. In 1202 and between 1212-1213, Martin was the Ban of Slavonia and he was styled Ban also in 1224 and 1234. In 1214, he held the office of judge royal (országbíró). He founded the Abbey of Ipolyság (today Šahy in Slovakia).

Achilles (b. 1210–1252) was bishop of Pécs between 1251 and 1252.

Lampert (of the branch of Csalomja) was bishop of Eger from 1247 to 1275.

Ivánka II from the Szeg branch was Judge royal sometime before 1289.

=== Gímes branch ===
Andrew I was a confidant of Béla IV of Hungary. He erected the castles of Gímes (Jelenec) and Turóc (Zniev). His sons were John, archbishop of Kalocsa from 1278 to 1301, and Thomas III, an influential baron. Both were strong partisans of King Andrew III of Hungary. Another sons were Andrew II and Ivánka III, who were killed by Matthew III Csák.

== Alternate theory on their origin ==
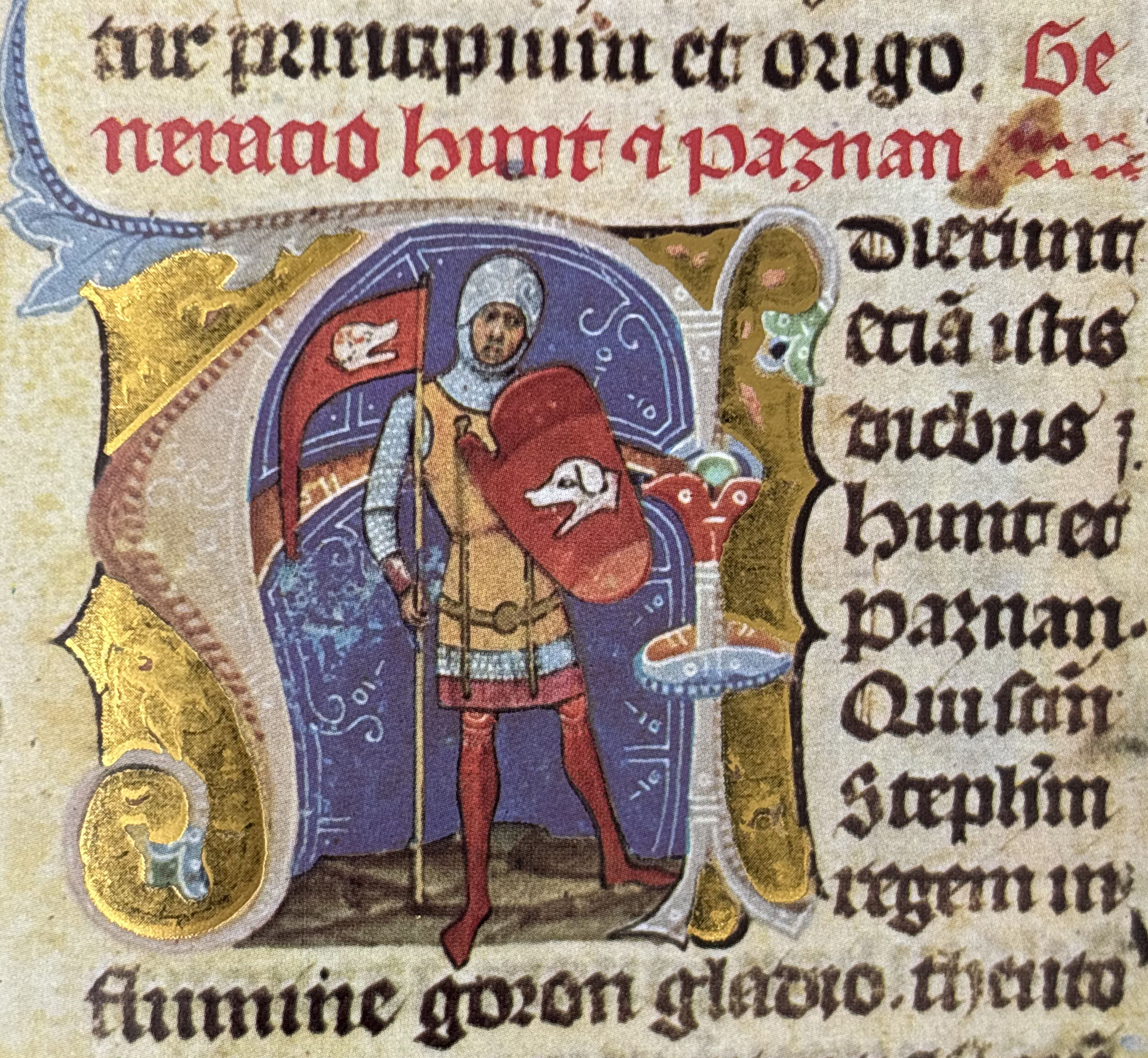
Hont depicted in the Chronicon Pictum

Some modern authors suggest that the clan Hont-Poznany was formed by intermarriages of two separate families, the Hunts and the Poznans ("Pázmánys", "Posnans") when the latter's male line died out in the mid-12th century. They claim that the ancestors both of the two families were already nobles at the time of Great Moravia and preserved their possessions after the incorporation of their territories into the arising Hungarian state. The theory suggests that they kept their Christian faith during the 10th century and its followers claim that the foundation deed of the Benedictine monastery of Bzovík proves that hereditary estates from the time before the arrival of the Magyars prevailed in the Hunts' property. The Pázmánys oversaw the Benedictine monastery below Zobor hill near Nitra and became its secular patrons. According to the theory, the seat of the Hunt family was the Hont castle and they ruled in the Central Ipeľ region in today's southern Slovakia, while the Pázmánys ruled in the region of today's north western Slovakia in the 10th century. Both families acknowledged the sovereignty of Michael of the House of Árpád and thus they became nobles at his court in Nitra. After Michael's death, the new ruler, Vajk (Stephen I) and the local nobility, spearheaded by the Pázmány and Hunt houses, developed very close personal ties and while fighting the Koppány rebellion in 997, Stephen took shelter with Pázmány and Hunt ("Poznano" and "Cuntio"); they in turn added their troops to the retinue of Stephen's Bavarian wife Giselle. The united forces then defeated Koppány, making Stephen the sole ruler of the emerging Hungarian state. In the 11th and 12th century the Hunts owned estates mainly in the county of Hont and along the Ipeľ river. By the 11th and 12th centuries the Pázmáns' estates were mainly in the valley of the Nitra river. According to the alternate theory, the Pázmáns' male line died out in the mid-12th century; allied by marriage to the Hunts, the line became "Hont-Pázmány".

== Sources ==
- Fügedi, Erik: Ispánok, bárók, kiskirályok - a középkori magyar arisztokrácia fejlődése (Counts, Barons and Petty Kings - The Development of the Hungarian Medieval Aristocracy); Magvető Könyvkiadó, 1986, Budapest; ISBN 963-14-0582-6.
- Kristó, Gyula (editor): Korai Magyar Történeti Lexikon - 9-14. század (Encyclopedia of the Early Hungarian History - 9-14th centuries); Akadémiai Kiadó, 1994, Budapest; ISBN 963-05-6722-9.
- Kristó, Gyula: Néhány megjegyzés a magyar nemzetségekről (Some remarks on the Hungarian clans), in: Tanulmányok az Árpád-korról, pp. 26-50. (Studies on the Age of the Árpáds); Magvető Könyvkiadó, 1983, Budapest; ISBN 963-271-890-9.
- Markó, László: A magyar állam főméltóságai Szent Istvántól napjainkig - Életrajzi Lexikon (The High Officers of the Hungarian State from Saint Stephen to the Present Days - A Biographical Encyclopedia); Magyar Könyvklub, 2000, Budapest; ISBN 963-547-085-1.
- Ján Lukačka: Beginnings of the formation of Aristocracy on the territory of Slovakia (available online)
- Lukačka, Ján (2010). "K otázke etnického pôvodu Hunt-Poznanovcov" [On the Ethnic Origin of the Magnate Clan Hont-Poznan]. Forum Historiae (in Slovak). 4 (2). Historical institute of Slovak Academy of Sciences. ISSN 1337-6861.
- Lukačka, Ján. 2002. Formovanie vyššej šľachty na západnom Slovensku.
- Ján Steinhübel: Nitrianske kniežatstvo [Nitrian principality], Veda, vydavateľstvo Slovenskej akadémie vied + Vydavateľstvo Rak, 2004, Bratislava [with several further Slovak and Hungarian genealogy and other references listed in the book]
- Hunt-Pázmán in: Slovakia and the Slovaks - A concise encyclopaedia, Encyklopedical Institute of the Slovak Academy of Sciences, 1994
