= Štefanovičová =

Štefanovičová Tarány
- Municipality
- Flag

- Location of Štefanovičová in the Nitra Region Location of Štefanovičová in Slovakia
- Coordinates: 48.19°N 18.09°E
- Country: Slovakia
- Region: Nitra Region
- District: Nitra District
- First mentioned: 1268

Government
  - Mayor: Jaroslav Bíro

Area
  - Total: 0.00 km^{2} (0 sq mi)
- Elevation: 138 m (453 ft)

Population (2025)
  - Total: 357
- Time zone: UTC+1 (CET)
  - Summer (DST): UTC+2 (CEST)
- Postal code: 951 14
- Area code: +421 37
- Vehicle registration plate (until 2022): NR

Štefanovičová (Hungarian: Tarány) is a village and municipality in the Nitra District in western central Slovakia, in the Nitra Region. Its mayor is now Jaroslav Bíro.

== History ==
In historical records the village was first mentioned in 1268.

== Geography ==
The municipality lies at an altitude of 138 metres (453 ft) and covers an area of 0.00 km^{2} (0 sq mi) (2025).

Štefanovičová is 19 kilometres south of Nitra, its administrative higher-up, and neighbours four other villages by road:

Branč to the east, Mojmírovce to the north, Poľný Kesov to the southwest and Veľká Dolina to the northwest

== Population ==
Population statistic (10 years)
Year	1995	2005	2015	2025
Count	0	276	346	357
Difference		–	+25.36%	+3.17%

Population statistic
Year	2024	2025
Count	350	357
Difference		+2%

It has a population of 357 people (31 December 2025).

=== Ethnicity ===
Census 2021 (1+ %)
Ethnicity	Number	Fraction
Slovak	295	91.9%
Not found out	18	5.6%
Hungarian	8	2.49%
Czech	4	1.24%
Total	321	

In year 2021 was 321 people by ethnicity 295 as Slovak, 18 as Not found out, 8 as Hungarian, 4 as Czech, 2 as German, 2 as Croatian, 1 as Romani and 1 as Romanian.

Note on population: The difference values of population numbers in the table "Population statistic" and in the sections "Ethnicity" & "Religion" is caused by the use of various statistical methods.

=== Religion ===
Census 2021 (1+ %)
Religion	Number	Fraction
Roman Catholic Church	168	52.34%
None	91	28.35%
Evangelical Church	29	9.03%
Not found out	18	5.61%
Christian Congregations in Slovakia	5	1.56%
Ad hoc movements	4	1.25%
Total	321	

In year 2021 was 321 people by religion 168 from Roman Catholic Church, 91 from None, 29 from Evangelical Church, 18 from Not found out, 5 from Christian Congregations in Slovakia, 4 from Ad hoc movements, 2 from Jehovah's Witnesses, 2 from Other, 1 from Calvinist Church and 1 from Eastern Orthodox Church.

== Facilities ==
The village has a public library a gym and football pitch.
