= Henry Balog =

- Died: after 1300
- Noble family: gens Balog
- Issue: John
- Father: Oth

Henry from the kindred Balog (Hungarian: Balog nembeli Henrik; died after 1300) was a Hungarian nobleman in the late 14th century. He was a councillor of King Andrew III of Hungary during the last years of his reign.

== Life ==
Henry was born into the Atyfi (Adfi, Othfi) branch of the gens (clan) Balog of German origin, which settled in the Kingdom of Hungary in the 11th century. His father was Oth. Henry had two brothers, Nicholas and Conrad. The latter was ancestor of the Atyfi de Balog and the Uza de Panyit noble families. Henry had a son John, who appeared in contemporary records between 1323 and 1331. He had no known descendants.

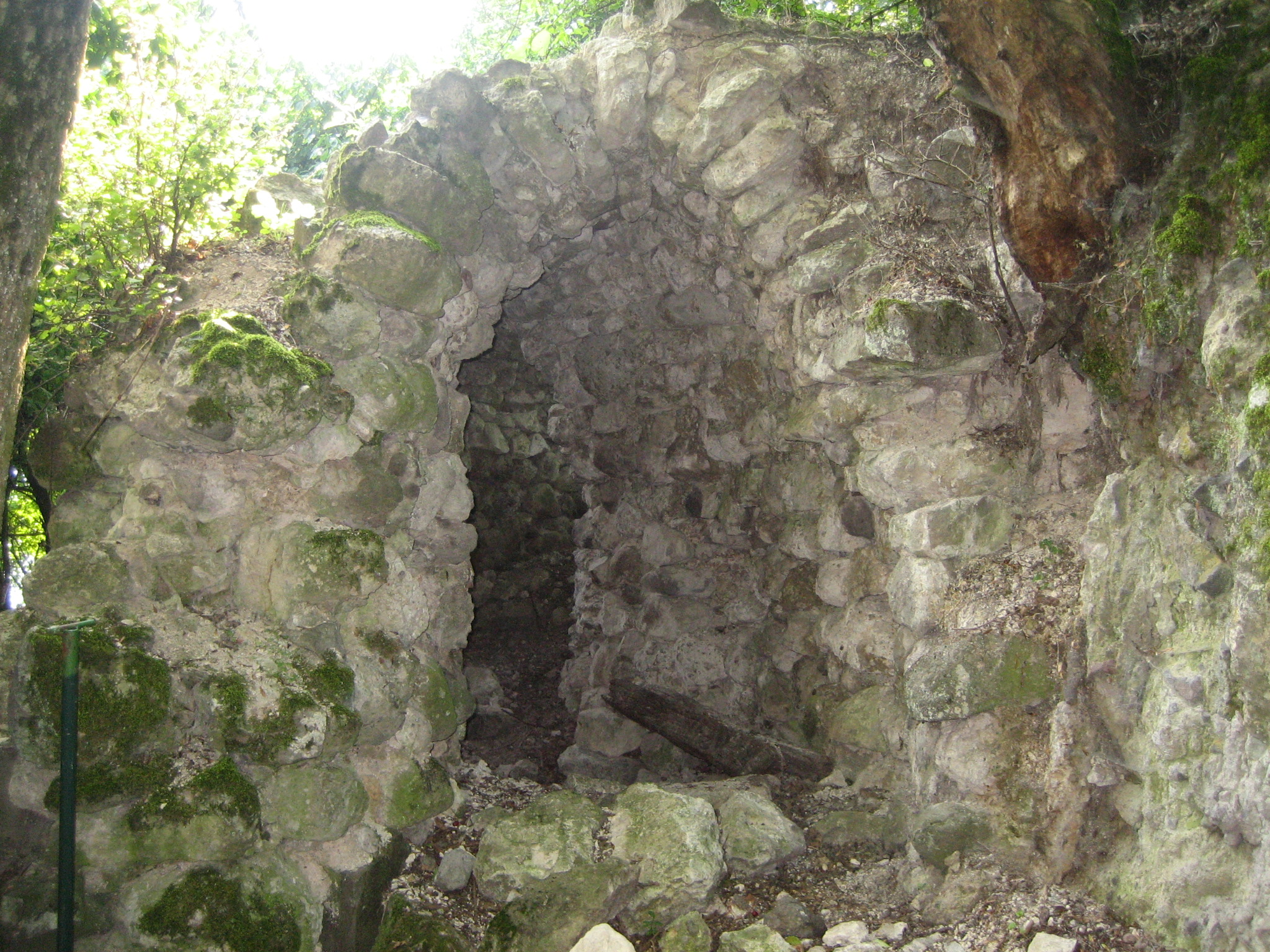
Ruins of Balog Castle, built by Henry Balog around 1290 (present-day at Veľký Blh, Slovakia)

Henry owned villages and landholdings in Gömör and Hont counties. According to historian Pál Engel, he erected a stone castle near the namesake estate of his clan, Balog in Gömör County (present-day Veľký Blh, Slovakia) around 1290. Because his son and nephews joined the allegiance of the powerful oligarch Matthew Csák in the early 14th century, Charles I of Hungary confiscated the castle from them in 1320. Three years later, the monarch handed over the fort to the pro-royal Szécsi branch of the Balog kindred. Sometime after 1290, Henry also owned the castle of Murány (present-day Muráň, Slovakia), after the sons of Stephen, son of Tekesh handed over it in exchange for their debt. Andrew III confirmed the contract in 1299, his charter referred to the fort as a "ruined castle".

One of the (23rd) articles of the 1298 national diet, under the influence of the clergy, established a four-member lesser council within the royal council, consisting of two nobles (representatives of the "nobility with uniform status") and two prelates (suffragans each belonging to the archdioceses of Esztergom and Kalocsa) with a three-month term. Thomas Hont-Pázmány and Henry Balog were elected councilors, representing the nobility. Henry already appeared in this position in February 1299. The members of the lesser council were granted veto power, thus effectively taking over the management of the entire royal council and successfully isolate Archbishop Gregory Bicskei, who turned against Andrew III. Both nobles were affiliated with the Hungarian prelates (Thomas was the brother of Archbishop John Hont-Pázmány), who were the strong pillars of Andrew's reign. When Bicskei refused to attend the 1299 national diet, Andrew III sent two envoys, Paul, provost of Kalocsa, and royal councilor Henry Balog to the archiepiscopal court of Esztergom to reconcile with the rebellious archbishop, but Bicskei already escaped to Andrew's domestic enemies by then. Henry was last referred to as a royal councilor in November 1300. His remaining fate is unknown.

== Sources ==
- Engel, Pál (1996). Magyarország világi archontológiája, 1301–1457, I [Secular Archontology of Hungary, 1301–1457, Volume I] (in Hungarian). História, MTA Történettudományi Intézete. ISBN 963-8312-44-0.
- Gerics, József (1987). A korai rendiség Európában és Magyarországon [The Early Society of Estates in Europe and Hungary] (in Hungarian). Akadémiai Kiadó. ISBN 963-05-4218-8.
