= Kociha =

Kociha Kecege
- Municipality
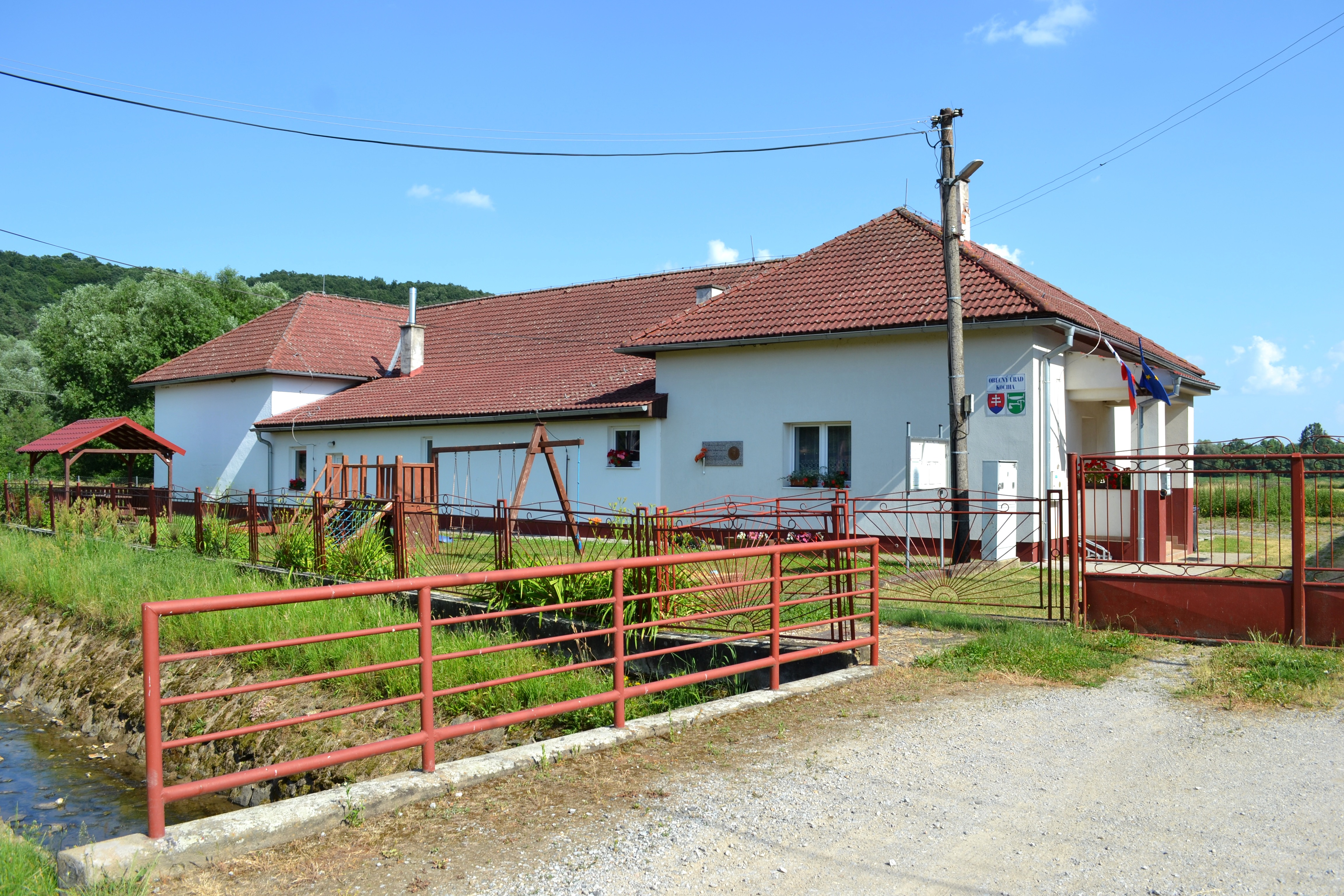
- Municipal office

- Flag

- Location of Kociha in the Banská Bystrica Region Location of Kociha in Slovakia
- Coordinates: 48.40°N 19.93°E
- Country: Slovakia
- Region: Banská Bystrica Region
- District: Rimavská Sobota District
- First mentioned: 1298

Area
  - Total: 11.40 km^{2} (4.40 sq mi)
- Elevation: 248 m (814 ft)

Population (2025)
  - Total: 188
- Time zone: UTC+1 (CET)
  - Summer (DST): UTC+2 (CEST)
- Postal code: 980 52
- Area code: +421 47
- Vehicle registration plate (until 2022): RS
- Website: www.kociha.sk

Kociha (Hungarian: Kecege) is a village and municipality in the Rimavská Sobota District of the Banská Bystrica Region of southern Slovakia. Part of the village is the settlement Suchý Potok, which is gradually developing as an agrotourism area. A notable sight is a late classical evangelical church.

== Geography ==
The municipality lies at an altitude of 248 metres (814 ft) and covers an area of 11.40 km^{2} (4.40 sq mi) (2025).

== Population ==
According to the Statistical Office of the Slovak Republic, the population of Kociha has changed as follows:

Population statistic (10 years)
Year	1995	2005	2015	2025
Count	241	222	219	188
Difference		−7.88%	−1.35%	−14.15%

Population statistic
Year	2024	2025
Count	193	188
Difference		−2.59%

It has a population of 188 people (31 December 2025).

In 1980 was life 265 people.

=== Ethnicity ===
Census 2021 (1+ %)
Ethnicity	Number	Fraction
Slovak	201	98.04%
Romani	6	2.92%
Not found out	3	1.46%
Total	205	

In year 2021 was 205 people by ethnicity 201 as Slovak, 6 as Romani, 3 as Not found out, 2 as Other and 1 as Hungarian.

Note on population: The difference values of population numbers in the table "Population statistic" and in the sections "Ethnicity" & "Religion" is caused by the use of various statistical methods.

=== Religion ===
Census 2021 (1+ %)
Religion	Number	Fraction
Roman Catholic Church	130	63.41%
None	44	21.46%
Evangelical Church	22	10.73%
Not found out	5	2.44%
Greek Catholic Church	4	1.95%
Total	205	

In year 2021 was 205 people by religion 130 from Roman Catholic Church, 44 from None, 22 from Evangelical Church, 5 from Not found out and 4 from Greek Catholic Church.

== See also ==
- List of municipalities and towns in Slovakia

== Genealogical resources ==
The records for genealogical research are available at the state archive "Štátny Archív in Banská Bystrica, Slovakia":

- Lutheran church records (births/marriages/deaths): 1713–1883 (parish B)
- Reformed church records (births/marriages/deaths): 1771–1896 (parish B)
