= Lúčnica nad Žitavou =

Lúčnica nad Žitavou Vajkmártonfalva
- Municipality
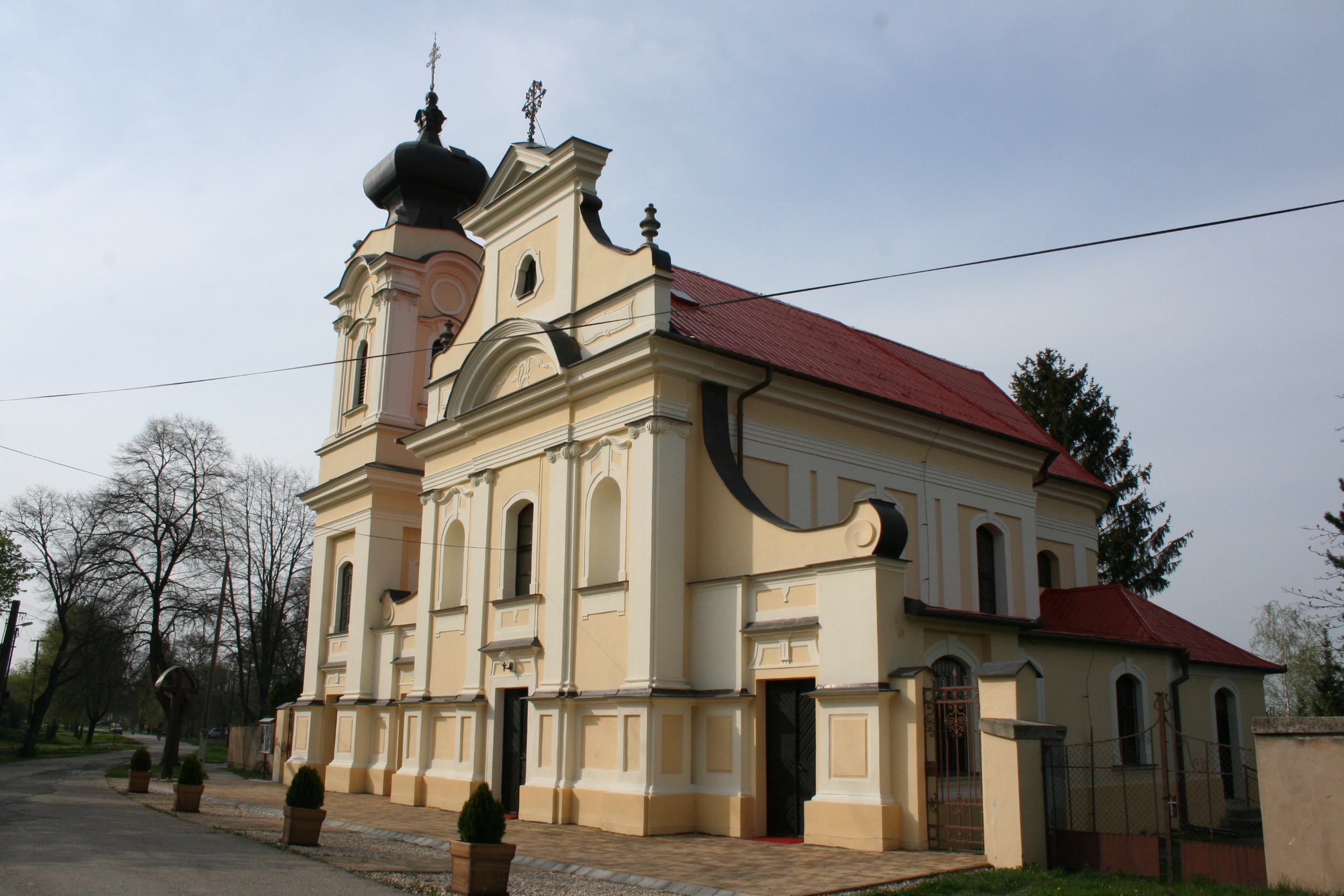
- Saint John of Nepomuk church

- Flag

- Location of Lúčnica nad Žitavou in the Nitra Region Location of Lúčnica nad Žitavou in Slovakia
- Coordinates: 48.21°N 18.29°E
- Country: Slovakia
- Region: Nitra Region
- District: Nitra District
- First mentioned: 1113

Area
  - Total: 12.10 km^{2} (4.67 sq mi)
- Elevation: 139 m (456 ft)

Population (2025)
  - Total: 1,008
- Time zone: UTC+1 (CET)
  - Summer (DST): UTC+2 (CEST)
- Postal code: 951 88
- Area code: +421 37
- Vehicle registration plate (until 2022): NR
- Website: www.obeclucnica.sk

Lúčnica nad Žitavou (Hungarian: Vajkmártonfalva) is a village and municipality in the Nitra District in western central Slovakia, in the Nitra Region. It arose in 1960 by merging of villages Martinová and Vajka nad Žitavou.

== History ==
In historical records the village was first mentioned in 1113.

== Geography ==
The municipality lies at an altitude of 139 metres (456 ft) and covers an area of 12.10 km^{2} (4.67 sq mi) (2025).

== Population ==
Population statistic (10 years)
Year	1995	2005	2015	2025
Count	942	917	914	1008
Difference		−2.65%	−0.32%	+10.28%

Population statistic
Year	2024	2025
Count	985	1008
Difference		+2.33%

It has a population of 1008 people (31 December 2025).

=== Ethnicity ===
Census 2021 (1+ %)
Ethnicity	Number	Fraction
Slovak	893	93.31%
Not found out	58	6.06%
Total	957	

In year 2021 was 957 people by ethnicity 893 as Slovak, 58 as Not found out, 8 as Hungarian, 6 as Romani, 4 as Czech, 3 as Russian, 3 as Other, 2 as Ukrainian, 2 as Romanian and 1 as Vietnamese.

Note on population: The difference values of population numbers in the table "Population statistic" and in the sections "Ethnicity" & "Religion" is caused by the use of various statistical methods.

=== Religion ===
Census 2021 (1+ %)
Religion	Number	Fraction
Roman Catholic Church	736	76.91%
None	141	14.73%
Not found out	57	5.96%
Evangelical Church	11	1.15%
Total	957	

In year 2021 was 957 people by religion 736 from Roman Catholic Church, 141 from None, 57 from Not found out, 11 from Evangelical Church, 5 from Eastern Orthodox Church, 2 from Other, 1 from Jewish community, 1 from Other and not ascertained christian church, 1 from Jehovah's Witnesses, 1 from Buddhism and 1 from Ad hoc movements.

== Facilities ==
The village has a public library and football pitch.
