= Branč =

Branč Berencs
- Municipality
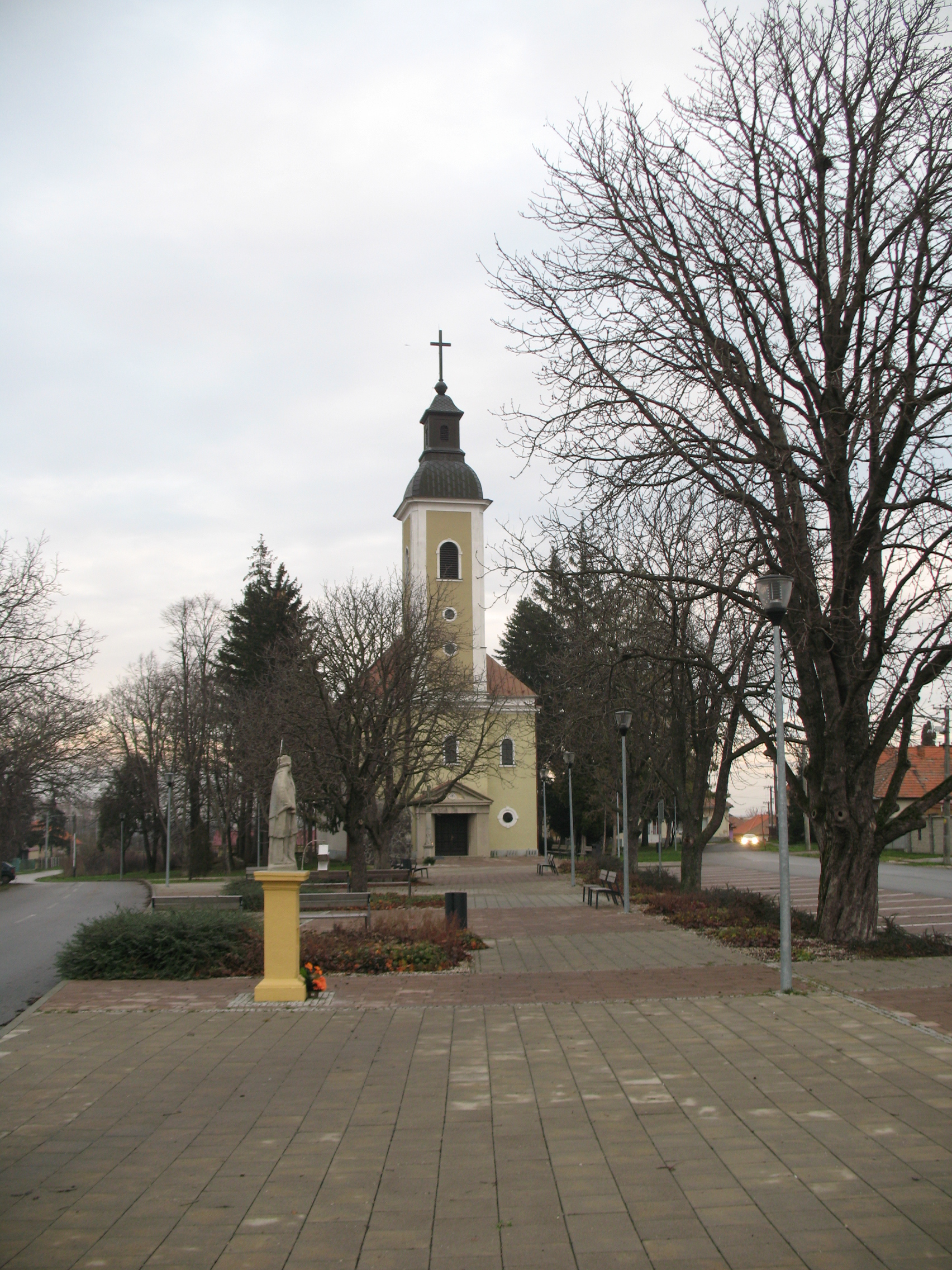
- Church of Visitation of Virgin Mary

- Flag

- Location of Branč in the Nitra Region Location of Branč in Slovakia
- Coordinates: 48.22°N 18.15°E
- Country: Slovakia
- Region: Nitra Region
- District: Nitra District
- First mentioned: 1156

Area
  - Total: 13.80 km^{2} (5.33 sq mi)
- Elevation: 133 m (436 ft)

Population (2025)
  - Total: 2,151
- Time zone: UTC+1 (CET)
  - Summer (DST): UTC+2 (CEST)
- Postal code: 951 13
- Area code: +421 37
- Vehicle registration plate (until 2022): NR
- Website: www.branc.sk

Branč (Hungarian: Berencs) is a village and municipality in the Nitra District in western Slovakia, in the Nitra Region.

== History ==
In historical records the village was first mentioned in 1156.

== Geography ==
The municipality lies at an altitude of 133 metres (436 ft) and covers an area of 13.80 km^{2} (5.33 sq mi) (2025).

== Population ==
Population statistic (10 years)
Year	1995	2005	2015	2025
Count	2008	2093	2206	2151
Difference		+4.23%	+5.39%	−2.49%

Population statistic
Year	2024	2025
Count	2169	2151
Difference		−0.82%

It has a population of 2151 people (31 December 2025).

=== Ethnicity ===
Census 2021 (1+ %)
Ethnicity	Number	Fraction
Slovak	1838	84.77%
Hungarian	387	17.85%
Not found out	52	2.39%
Romani	43	1.98%
Total	2168	

In year 2021 was 2168 people by ethnicity 1838 as Slovak, 387 as Hungarian, 52 as Not found out, 43 as Romani, 14 as Czech, 4 as Polish, 3 as German, 3 as Other, 2 as Ukrainian, 2 as Russian, 1 as Romanian, 1 as Iranian and 1 as Greek.

Note on population: The difference values of population numbers in the table "Population statistic" and in the sections "Ethnicity" & "Religion" is caused by the use of various statistical methods.

=== Religion ===
Census 2021 (1+ %)
Religion	Number	Fraction
Roman Catholic Church	1721	79.38%
None	314	14.48%
Not found out	48	2.21%
Total	2168	

In year 2021 was 2168 people by religion 1721 from Roman Catholic Church, 314 from None, 48 from Not found out, 15 from Evangelical Church, 12 from Greek Catholic Church, 11 from Calvinist Church, 11 from Jehovah's Witnesses, 11 from Ad hoc movements, 9 from Other, 5 from Eastern Orthodox Church, 3 from Christian Congregations in Slovakia, 3 from Buddhism, 2 from Other and not ascertained christian church, 1 from Paganism and natural spirituality, 1 from Islam and 1 from United Methodist Church.

== Facilities ==
The village has a public library, DVD rental store and football pitch.

== See also ==
- List of municipalities and towns in Slovakia

== Genealogical resources ==
The records for genealogical research are available at the state archive "Statny Archiv in Nitra, Slovakia"

- Roman Catholic church records (births/marriages/deaths): 1704-1945 (parish A)
- Lutheran church records (births/marriages/deaths): 1887-1954 (parish B)
