= Lehota nad Rimavicou =

Lehota nad Rimavicou Rimaszabadi
- Municipality
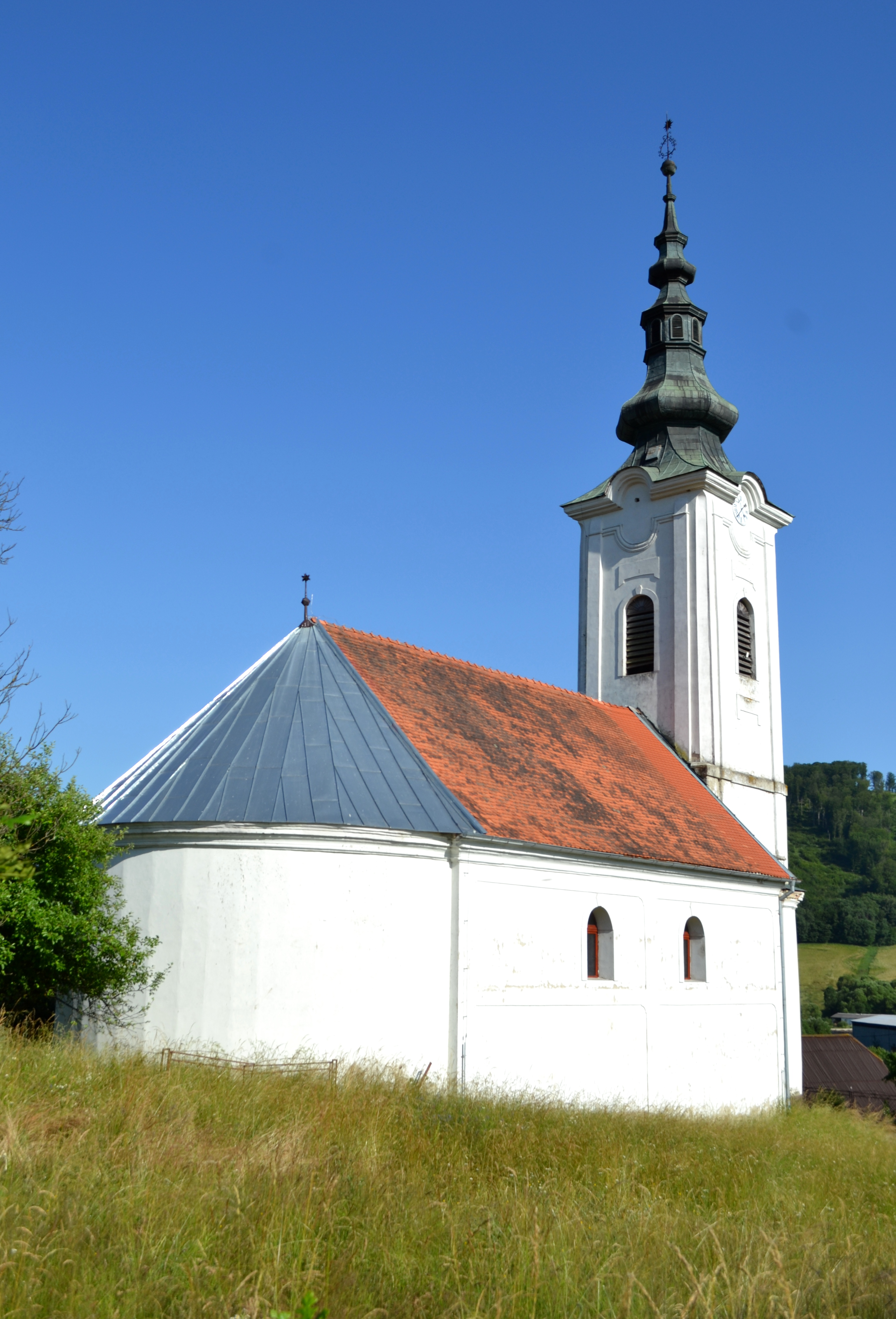

- Flag

- Location of Lehota nad Rimavicou in the Banská Bystrica Region Location of Lehota nad Rimavicou in Slovakia
- Coordinates: 48.50°N 19.90°E
- Country: Slovakia
- Region: Banská Bystrica Region
- District: Rimavská Sobota District
- First mentioned: 1274

Area
  - Total: 30.06 km^{2} (11.61 sq mi)
- Elevation: 270 m (890 ft)

Population (2025)
  - Total: 250
- Time zone: UTC+1 (CET)
  - Summer (DST): UTC+2 (CEST)
- Postal code: 980 53
- Area code: +421 47
- Vehicle registration plate (until 2022): RS

Lehota nad Rimavicou (Hungarian: Rimaszabadi) is a village and municipality in the Rimavská Sobota District of the Banská Bystrica Region of southern Slovakia. Main activity of the locals had been forestry, agrobusiness and trade. Most important sightseeing is baroque-classical Lutheran church from 1796. In 2001 had been constructed Roman Catholic church.

== Geography ==
The municipality lies at an altitude of 270 metres (890 ft) and covers an area of 30.06 km^{2} (11.61 sq mi) (2025).

== Population ==
Population statistic (10 years)
Year	1995	2005	2015	2025
Count	346	315	271	250
Difference		−8.95%	−13.96%	−7.74%

Population statistic
Year	2024	2025
Count	257	250
Difference		−2.72%

It has a population of 250 people (31 December 2025).

=== Ethnicity ===
Census 2021 (1+ %)
Ethnicity	Number	Fraction
Slovak	268	96.75%
Other	5	1.8%
Not found out	3	1.08%
Hungarian	3	1.08%
Total	277	

In year 2021 was 277 people by ethnicity 268 as Slovak, 5 as Other, 3 as Not found out, 3 as Hungarian, 2 as Romanian, 1 as Austrian and 1 as Polish.

Note on population: The difference values of population numbers in the table "Population statistic" and in the sections "Ethnicity" & "Religion" is caused by the use of various statistical methods.

=== Religion ===
Census 2021 (1+ %)
Religion	Number	Fraction
Roman Catholic Church	105	37.91%
None	87	31.41%
Evangelical Church	63	22.74%
Not found out	16	5.78%
Greek Catholic Church	4	1.44%
Total	277	

In year 2021 was 277 people by religion 105 from Roman Catholic Church, 87 from None, 63 from Evangelical Church, 16 from Not found out, 4 from Greek Catholic Church, 1 from Christian Congregations in Slovakia and 1 from Ad hoc movements.
