= Kmeťovo =

Village and municipality in Slovakia

Kmeťovo Gyarak
- Municipality
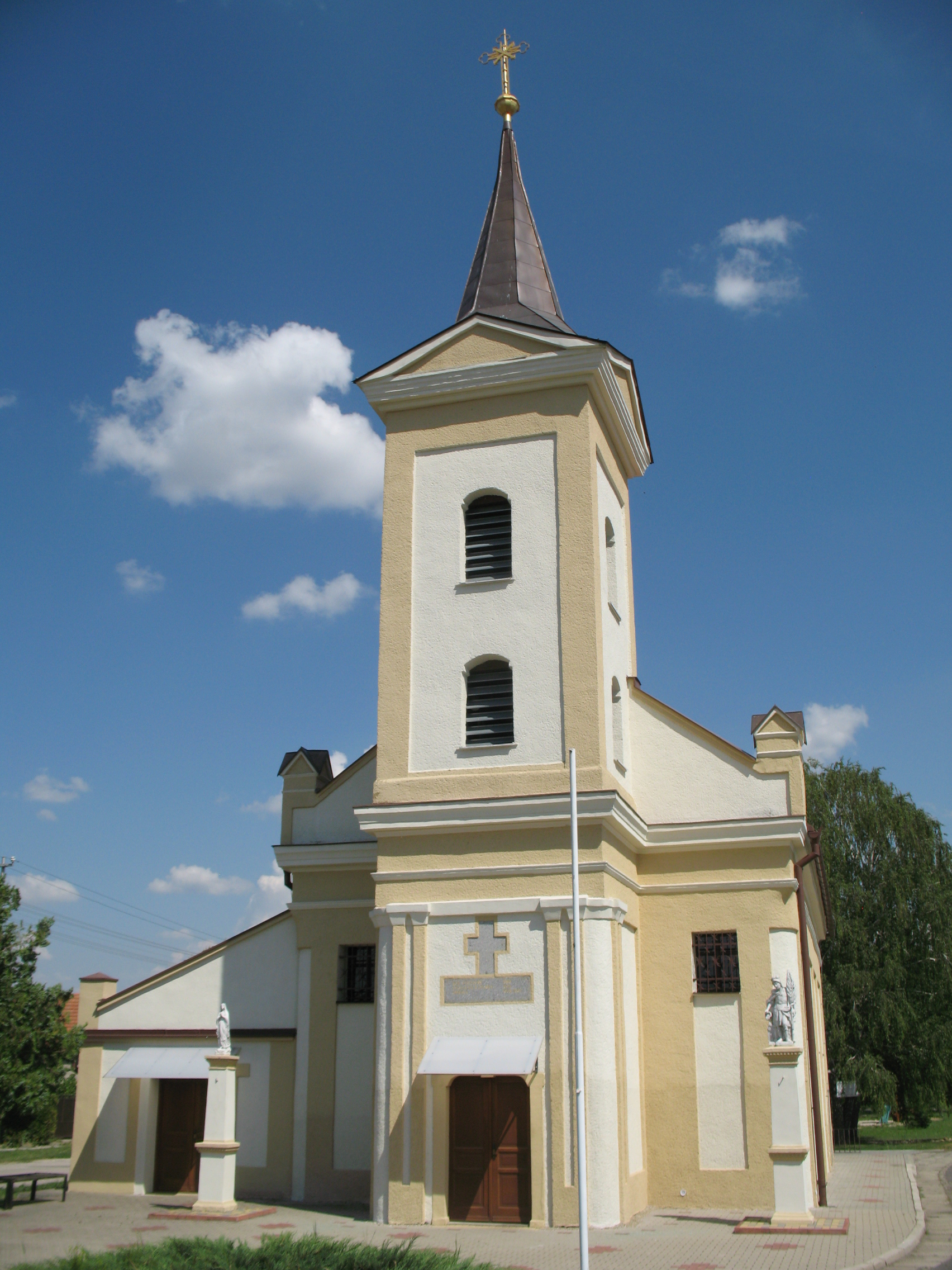

- Flag

- Location of Kmeťovo in the Nitra Region Location of Kmeťovo in Slovakia
- Coordinates: 48.17°N 18.28°E
- Country: Slovakia
- Region: Nitra Region
- District: Nové Zámky District
- First mentioned: 1214

Area
  - Total: 5.19 km^{2} (2.00 sq mi)
- Elevation: 131 m (430 ft)

Population (2025)
  - Total: 785
- Time zone: UTC+1 (CET)
  - Summer (DST): UTC+2 (CEST)
- Postal code: 941 62
- Area code: +421 35
- Vehicle registration plate (until 2022): NZ
- Website: www.kmetovo.sk

Kmeťovo (Hungarian: Gyarak) is a village and municipality in the Nové Zámky District in the Nitra Region of south-west Slovakia.

== History ==
In historical records the village was first mentioned in 1214

== Geography ==
The municipality lies at an altitude of 131 metres (430 ft) and covers an area of 5.19 km^{2} (2.00 sq mi) (2025).

== Population ==
Population statistic (10 years)
Year	1995	2005	2015	2025
Count	942	945	863	785
Difference		+0.31%	−8.67%	−9.03%

Population statistic
Year	2024	2025
Count	809	785
Difference		−2.96%

It has a population of 785 people (31 December 2025).

=== Ethnicity ===
Census 2021 (1+ %)
Ethnicity	Number	Fraction
Slovak	797	96.37%
Not found out	27	3.26%
Total	827	

In year 2021 was 827 people by ethnicity 797 as Slovak, 27 as Not found out, 4 as Russian, 4 as Hungarian, 2 as Czech and 1 as Other.

Note on population: The difference values of population numbers in the table "Population statistic" and in the sections "Ethnicity" & "Religion" is caused by the use of various statistical methods.

=== Religion ===
Census 2021 (1+ %)
Religion	Number	Fraction
Roman Catholic Church	689	83.31%
None	92	11.12%
Not found out	25	3.02%
Total	827	

In year 2021 was 827 people by religion 689 from Roman Catholic Church, 92 from None, 25 from Not found out, 4 from Jehovah's Witnesses, 4 from Other, 4 from Ad hoc movements, 2 from Other and not ascertained christian church, 2 from Greek Catholic Church, 2 from Evangelical Church, 2 from Apostolic Church and 1 from Calvinist Church.

== Facilities ==
The village has a public library, football pitch and Catholic church.

=== Catholic church ===
The Catholic church was built in 1882, and it was a part of the parish of Michal nad Zitavou, a village and municipality in the Nové Zámky District in the Nitra Region of southwest Slovakia.

Considered to be an important historical monument for people in Kmetovo, Slovakia, this Roman Catholic church was dedicated in 1994 as Our Lady of the Rosary. The church was designed in a classical style, with construction being completed in 1882. Due to the water-logged soils of the marsh that the church was built on, several attempts were made at creating a drainage area behind the church, but to no avail. The church then underwent extensive reconstruction in 1942 to stabilize its construction and solve the drainage problem. An extension to the church was completed in 1994. In 2001, the church interior and exterior was repainted, the roof was replaced, and a gilded cross was added to its spire.

== Genealogical resources ==
The records for genealogical research are available at the state archive "Statny Archiv in Nitra, Slovakia"

- Roman Catholic church records (births/marriages/deaths): 1722-1896 (parish B)

== See also ==
- List of municipalities and towns in Slovakia
