= Mojmírovce =

Village and municipality in Slovakia

Mojmírovce Ürmény
- Municipality
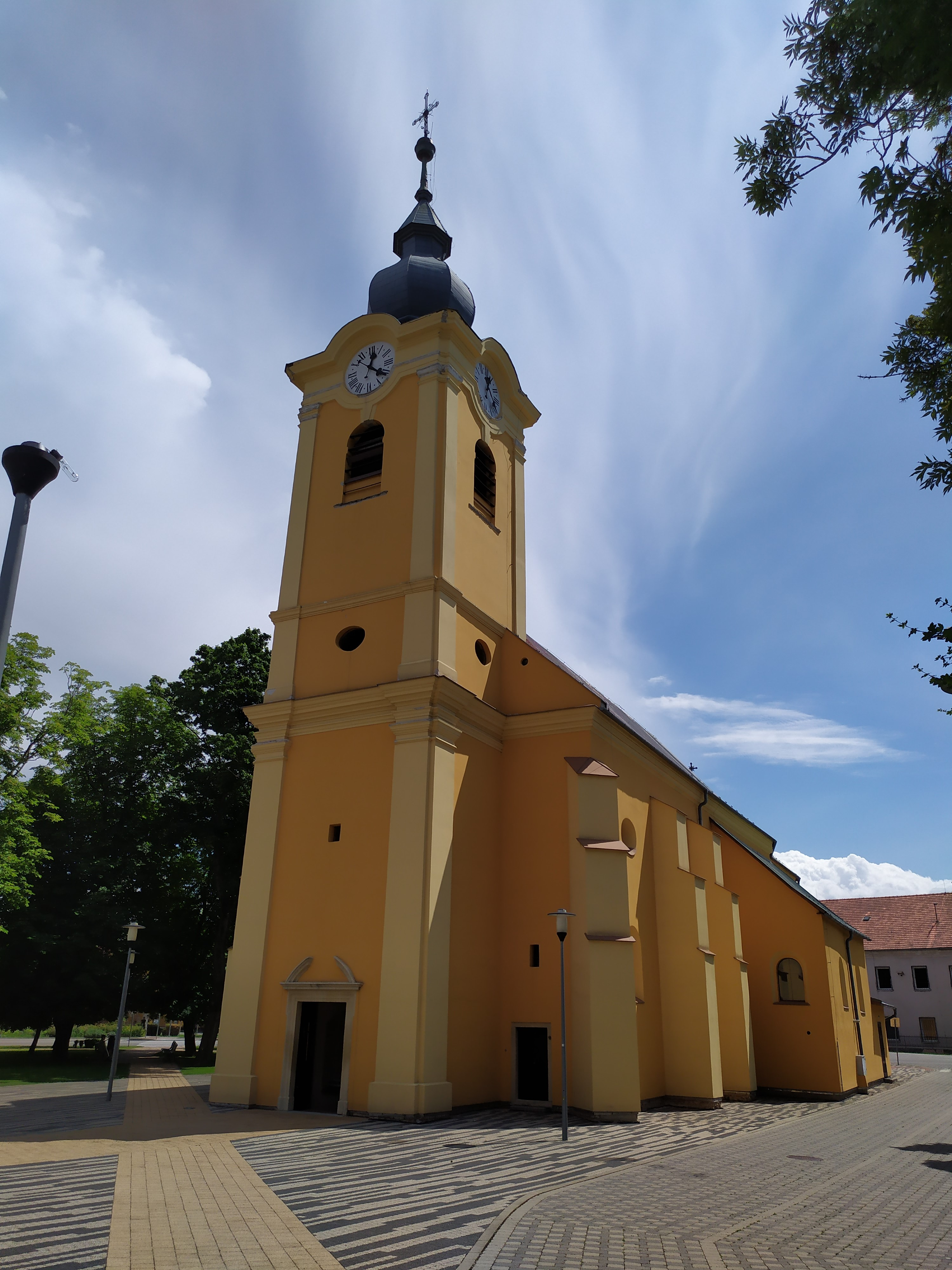
- Church of Saint Ladislaus

- Flag

- Location of Mojmírovce in the Nitra Region Location of Mojmírovce in Slovakia
- Coordinates: 48.22°N 18.07°E
- Country: Slovakia
- Region: Nitra Region
- District: Nitra District
- First mentioned: 1156

Area
  - Total: 32.26 km^{2} (12.46 sq mi)
- Elevation: 142 m (466 ft)

Population (2025)
  - Total: 2,995
- Time zone: UTC+1 (CET)
  - Summer (DST): UTC+2 (CEST)
- Postal code: 951 15
- Area code: +421 37
- Vehicle registration plate (until 2022): NR
- Website: www.mojmirovce.sk

Mojmírovce (Hungarian: Ürmény) is a village and municipality in the Nitra District in western central Slovakia, in the Nitra Region.

== History ==
In historical records the village was first mentioned in 1156.

== Geography ==
The municipality lies at an altitude of 142 metres (466 ft) and covers an area of 32.26 km^{2} (12.46 sq mi) (2025).

== Population ==
Population statistic (10 years)
Year	1995	2005	2015	2025
Count	2849	2762	2884	2995
Difference		−3.05%	+4.41%	+3.84%

Population statistic
Year	2024	2025
Count	2950	2995
Difference		+1.52%

It has a population of 2995 people (31 December 2025).

=== Ethnicity ===
Census 2021 (1+ %)
Ethnicity	Number	Fraction
Slovak	2704	92.53%
Not found out	191	6.53%
Total	2922	

In year 2021 was 2922 people by ethnicity 2704 as Slovak, 191 as Not found out, 24 as Czech, 20 as Hungarian, 17 as Russian, 14 as Other, 5 as Romani, 3 as Ukrainian, 3 as Serbian, 2 as Greek, 1 as Rusyn, 1 as Austrian, 1 as Polish, 1 as German and 1 as Moravian.

Note on population: The difference values of population numbers in the table "Population statistic" and in the sections "Ethnicity" & "Religion" is caused by the use of various statistical methods.

=== Religion ===
Census 2021 (1+ %)
Religion	Number	Fraction
Roman Catholic Church	1924	65.85%
None	634	21.7%
Not found out	194	6.64%
Evangelical Church	53	1.81%
Total	2922	

In year 2021 was 2922 people by religion 1924 from Roman Catholic Church, 634 from None, 194 from Not found out, 53 from Evangelical Church, 28 from Greek Catholic Church, 26 from Christian Congregations in Slovakia, 18 from Eastern Orthodox Church, 11 from Other, 8 from Old Catholic Church, 8 from Calvinist Church, 6 from Ad hoc movements, 4 from Other and not ascertained christian church, 3 from Apostolic Church, 2 from United Methodist Church, 1 from Jewish community, 1 from Paganism and natural spirituality and 1 from Buddhism.

== Facilities ==
The village has a public library, a gym, a church and an art exhibit.

== Famous people ==
- Vilmos Fraknói, historian, secretary of HAS, titular bishop, canon of Várad
