= Podhájska =

Podhájska Bellegszencse
- Municipality
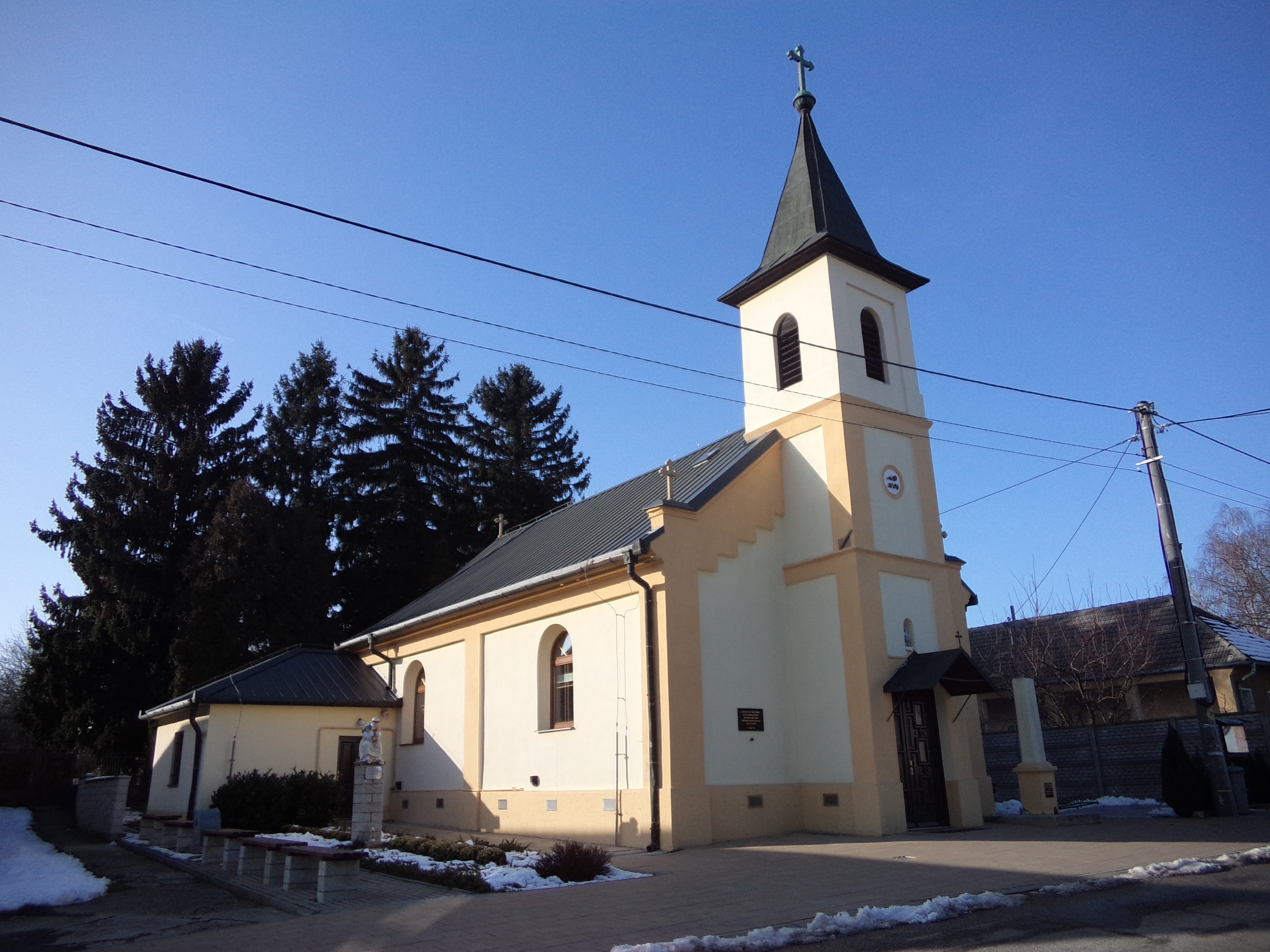
- Church of the Nativity of the Virgin Mary

- Flag

- Location of Podhájska in the Nitra Region Location of Podhájska in Slovakia
- Coordinates: 48.11°N 18.34°E
- Country: Slovakia
- Region: Nitra Region
- District: Nové Zámky District
- First mentioned: 1075

Area
  - Total: 11.11 km^{2} (4.29 sq mi)
- Elevation: 144 m (472 ft)

Population (2025)
  - Total: 1,059
- Time zone: UTC+1 (CET)
  - Summer (DST): UTC+2 (CEST)
- Postal code: 941 48
- Area code: +421 35
- Vehicle registration plate (until 2022): NZ
- Website: www.obecpodhajska.sk

Podhájska (Hungarian: Bellegszencse) is a village and municipality in the Nové Zámky District in the Nitra Region of south-west Slovakia.

== History ==
In historical records the village was first mentioned in 1075.

== Geography ==
The municipality lies at an altitude of 144 metres (472 ft) and covers an area of 11.11 km^{2} (4.29 sq mi) (2025).

=== Climate ===
The Köppen Climate Classification subtype for this climate is "Dfb" (Warm Summer Continental Climate).

Climate data for Podhájska
Month	Jan	Feb	Mar	Apr	May	Jun	Jul	Aug	Sep	Oct	Nov	Dec	Year
Record high °C (°F)	17.4 (63.3)	19.8 (67.6)	25.6 (78.1)	30.3 (86.5)	33.7 (92.7)	37.5 (99.5)	39.5 (103.1)	40.2 (104.4)	37.9 (100.2)	28.4 (83.1)	23.8 (74.8)	19.1 (66.4)	40.2 (104.4)
Mean daily maximum °C (°F)	1.6 (34.9)	4.4 (39.9)	10.4 (50.7)	16.3 (61.3)	21.4 (70.5)	24.4 (75.9)	26.6 (79.9)	26.0 (78.8)	21.5 (70.7)	15.3 (59.5)	7.7 (45.9)	2.9 (37.2)	14.9 (58.8)
Daily mean °C (°F)	−0.2 (31.6)	1.1 (34.0)	6.2 (43.2)	11.7 (53.1)	16.5 (61.7)	19.6 (67.3)	21.3 (70.3)	20.8 (69.4)	17.1 (62.8)	11.7 (53.1)	5.2 (41.4)	0.8 (33.4)	11 (52)
Mean daily minimum °C (°F)	−2.3 (27.9)	−0.1 (31.8)	3.1 (37.6)	7.4 (45.3)	12.2 (54.0)	15.4 (59.7)	16.2 (61.2)	15.7 (60.3)	12.9 (55.2)	8.1 (46.6)	2.8 (37.0)	−0.9 (30.4)	7.5 (45.5)
Record low °C (°F)	−26.5 (−15.7)	−23.9 (−11.0)	−15.8 (3.6)	−6.1 (21.0)	−1.1 (30.0)	4.3 (39.7)	7.6 (45.7)	7.1 (44.8)	1.4 (34.5)	−7.7 (18.1)	−15.5 (4.1)	−24.6 (−12.3)	−26.5 (−15.7)
Average precipitation mm (inches)	19.8 (0.78)	20.1 (0.79)	27.5 (1.08)	38.1 (1.50)	49.6 (1.95)	60.2 (2.37)	67.5 (2.66)	66.9 (2.63)	58.4 (2.30)	53.2 (2.09)	39.7 (1.56)	25.4 (1.00)	526.4 (20.71)
Average snowfall cm (inches)	24.8 (9.8)	20.3 (8.0)	7.9 (3.1)	2.1 (0.8)	0.0 (0.0)	0.0 (0.0)	0.0 (0.0)	0.0 (0.0)	0.0 (0.0)	0.8 (0.3)	8.1 (3.2)	21.9 (8.6)	85.9 (33.8)
Average precipitation days (≥ 6.2)	6.7	7.5	8.8	10.1	9.4	9.1	8.8	8.7	9.8	9.1	7.9	6.5	102.4
Mean monthly sunshine hours	68.9	98.9	140.4	189.6	221.1	248.2	265.5	256.3	199.8	129.5	78.6	46.7	1,943.5
Source: Central Institute for Meteorology and Geodynamics

== Population ==
Population statistic (10 years)
Year	1995	2005	2015	2025
Count	1248	1152	1029	1059
Difference		−7.69%	−10.67%	+2.91%

Population statistic
Year	2024	2025
Count	1062	1059
Difference		−0.28%

It has a population of 1059 people (31 December 2025).

=== Ethnicity ===
Census 2021 (1+ %)
Ethnicity	Number	Fraction
Slovak	998	92.66%
Not found out	39	3.62%
Other	20	1.85%
Hungarian	12	1.11%
Total	1077	

In year 2021 was 1077 people by ethnicity 998 as Slovak, 39 as Not found out, 20 as Other, 12 as Hungarian, 10 as Czech, 5 as Vietnamese, 5 as Russian, 3 as Ukrainian, 1 as Serbian and 1 as Rusyn.

Note on population: The difference values of population numbers in the table "Population statistic" and in the sections "Ethnicity" & "Religion" is caused by the use of various statistical methods.

=== Religion ===
Census 2021 (1+ %)
Religion	Number	Fraction
Roman Catholic Church	828	76.88%
None	163	15.13%
Not found out	40	3.71%
Total	1077	

In year 2021 was 1077 people by religion 828 from Roman Catholic Church, 163 from None, 40 from Not found out, 9 from Calvinist Church, 8 from Greek Catholic Church, 8 from Evangelical Church, 5 from Jehovah's Witnesses, 4 from Christian Congregations in Slovakia, 3 from Seventh-day Adventist Church, 3 from Ad hoc movements, 2 from Eastern Orthodox Church, 1 from Paganism and natural spirituality, 1 from Other, 1 from United Methodist Church and 1 from Buddhism.

== Facilities ==
The village has a small public library a swimming pool and a football pitch.
