= Kláštor pod Znievom =

- Municipality
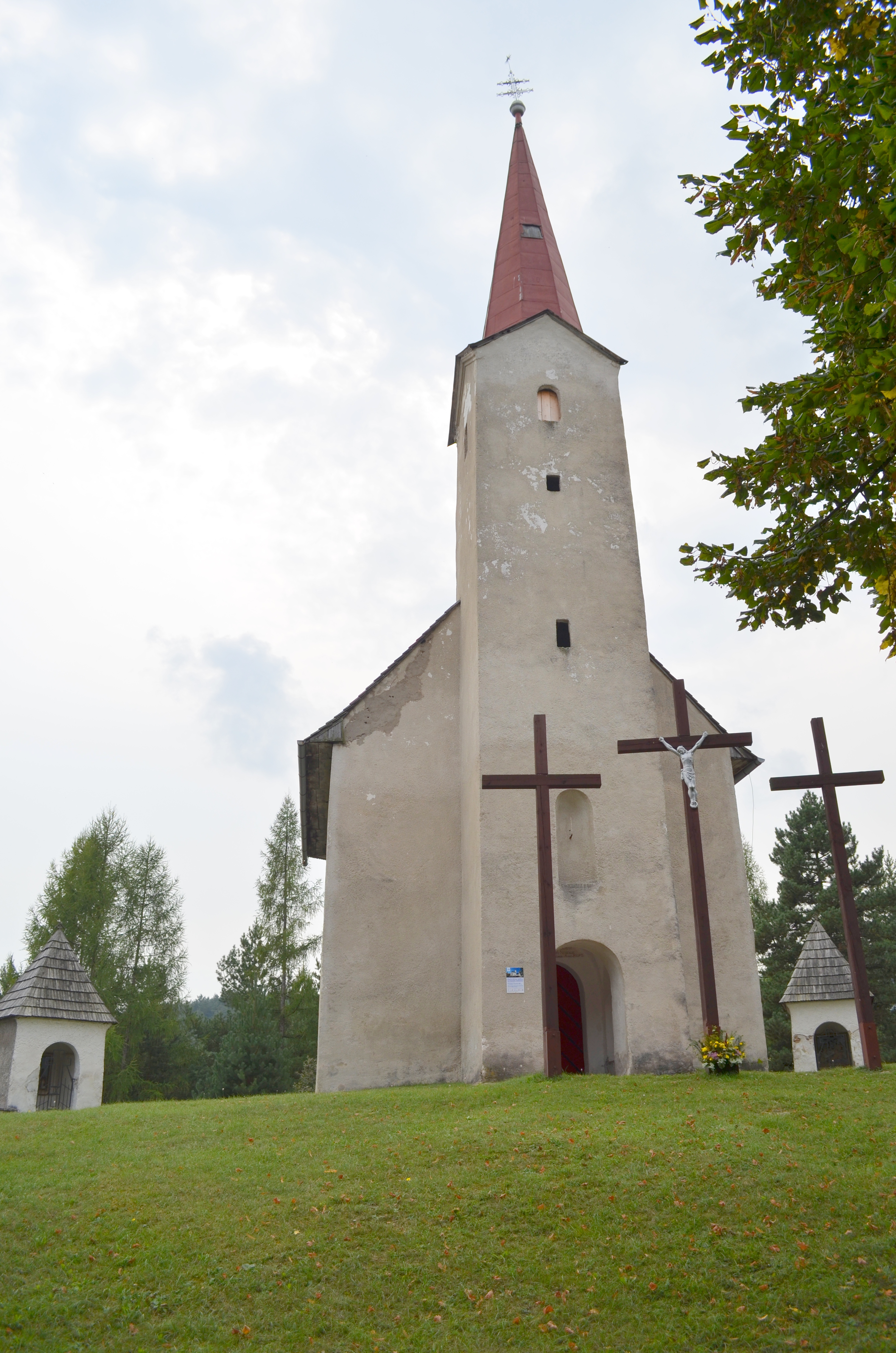

- Flag

- Location of Kláštor pod Znievom in the Žilina Region Location of Kláštor pod Znievom in Slovakia
- Coordinates: 48.97°N 18.81°E
- Country: Slovakia
- Region: Žilina Region
- District: Martin District
- First mentioned: 1112

Area
  - Total: 39.02 km^{2} (15.07 sq mi)
- Elevation: 494 m (1,621 ft)

Population (2025)
  - Total: 1,836
- Time zone: UTC+1 (CET)
  - Summer (DST): UTC+2 (CEST)
- Postal code: 384 3
- Area code: +421 43
- Vehicle registration plate (until 2022): MT
- Website: www.obecklastor.sk

Kláštor pod Znievom (Hungarian: Znióváralja, German: Kloster-Kühhorn) is a village and municipality in Martin District in the Žilina Region of northern Slovakia, south west from Martin, near the Malá Fatra mountains.

== History ==
In historical records the village was first mentioned in 1113. Its castle Zniev was built by Andrew Hont-Pázmány. From 1242 to 1249 the castle was the seat of king Béla IV of Hungary. Around the half of the 13th century, the settlement got town privileges as the first one in the Turiec region, but it lost them in 1666 during the time of Reformation and Counter-Reformation. In the second half of the 19th century, Kláštor pod Znievom became one of the centres of Slovak national movement, as one of three Slovak high schools was opened here in 1869, but was closed down in 1874 as a result of the Magyarization policy. Before the establishment of independent Czechoslovakia in 1918, Kláštor pod Znievom was part of Turóc County within the Kingdom of Hungary. From 1939 to 1945, it was part of the Slovak Republic.

== Geography ==
The municipality lies at an altitude of 494 metres (1,621 ft) and covers an area of 39.02 km^{2} (15.07 sq mi) (2025).

== Population ==
Population statistic (10 years)
Year	1995	2005	2015	2025
Count	1512	1499	1591	1836
Difference		−0.85%	+6.13%	+15.39%

Population statistic
Year	2024	2025
Count	1843	1836
Difference		−0.37%

It has a population of 1836 people (31 December 2025).

=== Ethnicity ===
Census 2021 (1+ %)
Ethnicity	Number	Fraction
Slovak	1691	96.24%
Not found out	70	3.98%
Total	1757	

In year 2021 was 1757 people by ethnicity 1691 as Slovak, 70 as Not found out, 15 as Czech, 6 as Other, 5 as Romani, 4 as Russian, 3 as Austrian, 3 as Polish, 3 as Hungarian, 2 as German, 1 as Irish, 1 as Rusyn and 1 as English.

Note on population: The difference values of population numbers in the table "Population statistic" and in the sections "Ethnicity" & "Religion" is caused by the use of various statistical methods.

=== Religion ===
Census 2021 (1+ %)
Religion	Number	Fraction
Roman Catholic Church	1006	57.26%
None	477	27.15%
Evangelical Church	170	9.68%
Not found out	62	3.53%
Total	1757	

In year 2021 was 1757 people by religion 1006 from Roman Catholic Church, 477 from None, 170 from Evangelical Church, 62 from Not found out, 10 from Greek Catholic Church, 7 from Other, 5 from Hinduism, 4 from Christian Congregations in Slovakia, 4 from Ad hoc movements, 3 from Calvinist Church, 3 from Other and not ascertained christian church, 2 from Eastern Orthodox Church, 2 from Buddhism, 1 from Old Catholic Church and 1 from Jehovah's Witnesses.

== People ==
- Alexander Moyzes, composer

== See also ==
- List of municipalities and towns in Slovakia
