= House of Forgách =

Hungarian noble family

- Parent house: Hont-Pázmány
- Country: Kingdom of Hungary
- Founded: 1241
- Founder: András I
- Current head: András (b. 1929) or János (b. 1948)
- Titles: Count Forgách de Ghymes et Gács
- Estates: Gímes, Gács

The House of Forgách was a Hungarian noble family in Hungary which became very influential during the Ottoman wars in Europe in Royal Hungary. The family held the title of Count in Hungary, granted to them on 11 May 1675.

== Notable members ==
- Ferenc Forgách (bishop of Várad) (1530–1577)
- Ferenc Forgách (archbishop of Esztergom) (1560–1615)
- Zsigmond Forgách (1559–1621)
- Ádám Forgách (1601–1681)
- János Forgách (1870–1935)

== See also ==
- List of titled noble families in the Kingdom of Hungary
