= Šarkan =

Šarkan Sárkányfalva
- Municipality
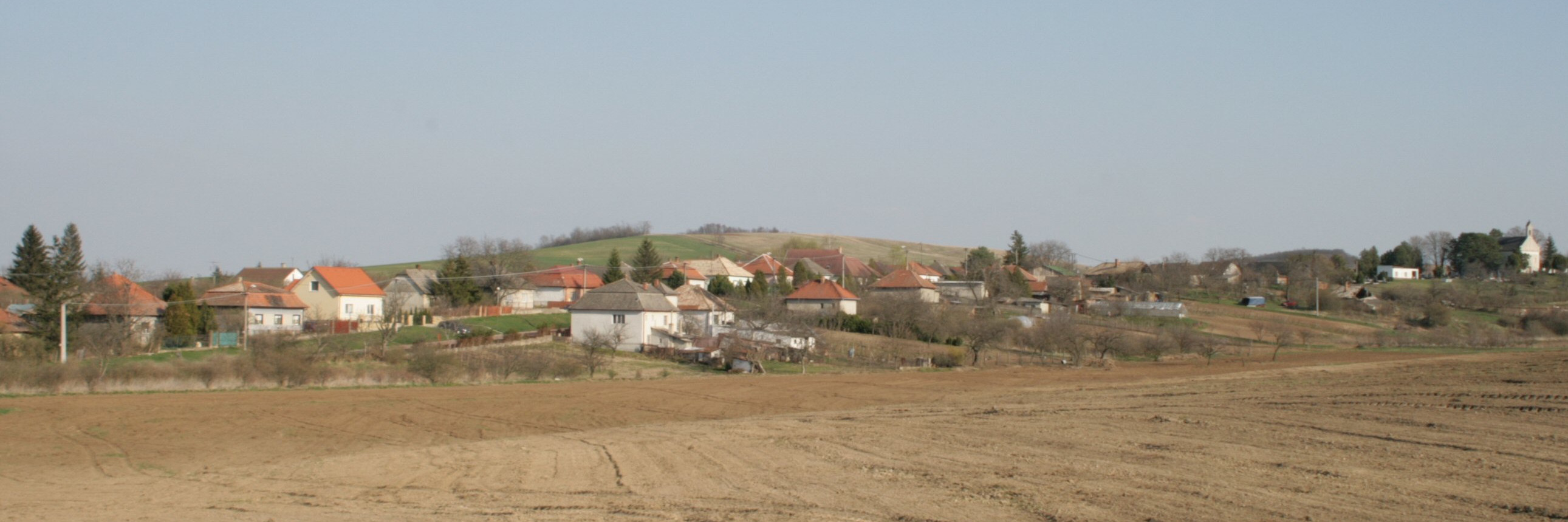

- Flag

- Location of Šarkan in the Nitra Region Location of Šarkan in Slovakia
- Coordinates: 47.87°N 18.57°E
- Country: Slovakia
- Region: Nitra Region
- District: Nové Zámky District
- First mentioned: 1247

Area
  - Total: 13.63 km^{2} (5.26 sq mi)
- Elevation: 131 m (430 ft)

Population (2025)
  - Total: 375
- Time zone: UTC+1 (CET)
  - Summer (DST): UTC+2 (CEST)
- Postal code: 943 42
- Area code: +421 36
- Vehicle registration plate (until 2022): NZ
- Website: www.obecsarkan.sk

Šarkan (Hungarian: Sárkányfalva) is a village and municipality in the Nové Zámky District in the Nitra Region of south-west Slovakia.

== History ==
In historical records the village was first mentioned in 1247.

== Geography ==
The municipality lies at an altitude of 131 metres (430 ft) and covers an area of 13.63 km^{2} (5.26 sq mi) (2025).

== Population ==
Population statistic (10 years)
Year	1995	2005	2015	2025
Count	392	355	385	375
Difference		−9.43%	+8.45%	−2.59%

Population statistic
Year	2024	2025
Count	369	375
Difference		+1.62%

It has a population of 375 people (31 December 2025).

=== Ethnicity ===
Census 2021 (1+ %)
Ethnicity	Number	Fraction
Hungarian	239	64.42%
Slovak	136	36.65%
Not found out	13	3.5%
Total	371	

In year 2021 was 371 people by ethnicity 239 as Hungarian, 136 as Slovak, 13 as Not found out, 2 as Romani and 1 as Irish.

Note on population: The difference values of population numbers in the table "Population statistic" and in the sections "Ethnicity" & "Religion" is caused by the use of various statistical methods.

=== Religion ===
Census 2021 (1+ %)
Religion	Number	Fraction
Roman Catholic Church	286	77.09%
None	59	15.9%
Not found out	12	3.23%
Calvinist Church	7	1.89%
Greek Catholic Church	4	1.08%
Total	371	

In year 2021 was 371 people by religion 286 from Roman Catholic Church, 59 from None, 12 from Not found out, 7 from Calvinist Church, 4 from Greek Catholic Church, 2 from Christian Congregations in Slovakia and 1 from Evangelical Church.

== Facilities ==
The village has a small public library and a football pitch.
