= Bardoňovo =

Village and municipality in Slovakia

Bardoňovo Barsbaracska
- Municipality
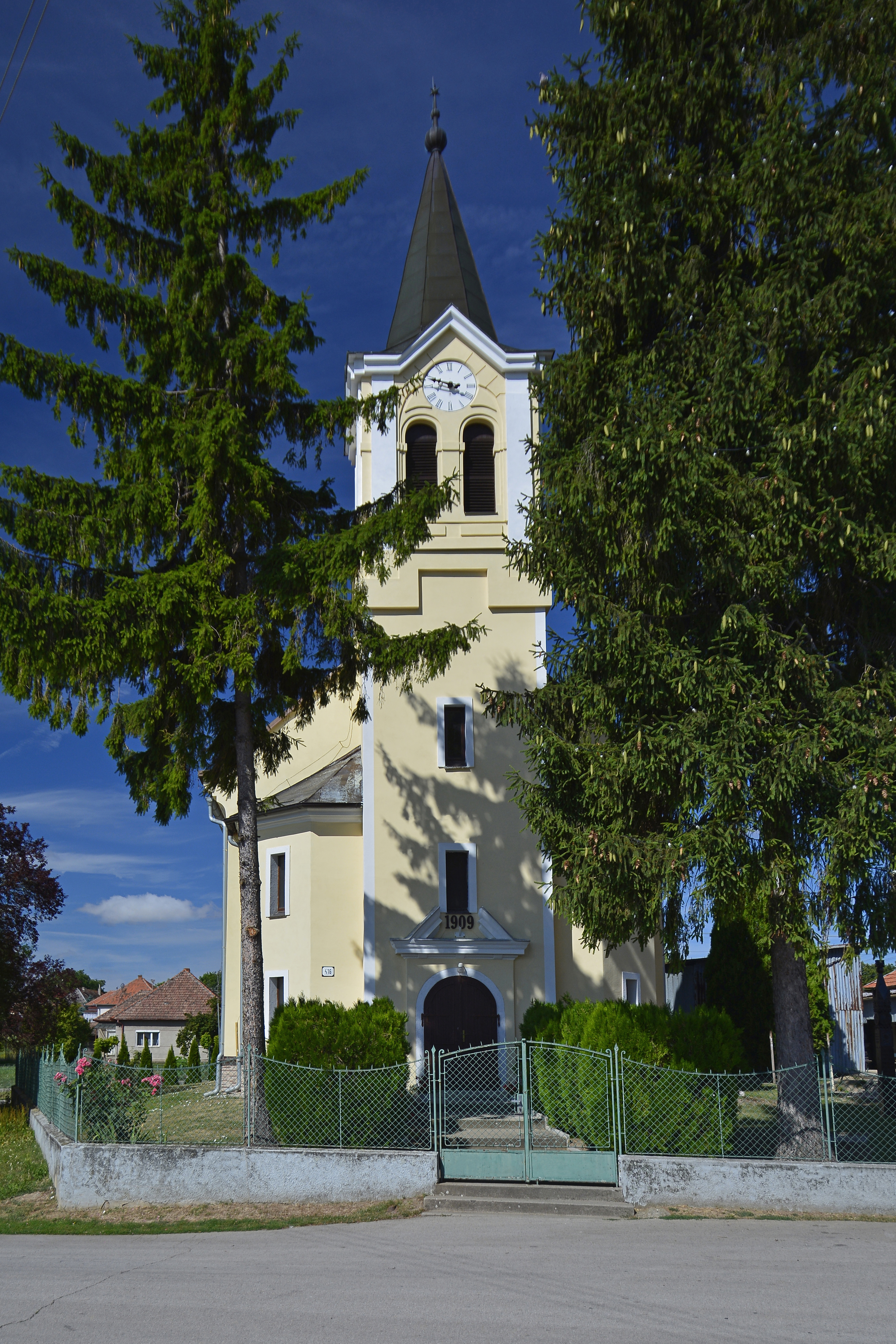

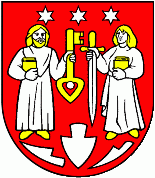
- Flag Coat of arms

- Location of Bardoňovo in the Nitra Region Location of Bardoňovo in Slovakia
- Coordinates: 48.12°N 18.42°E
- Country: Slovakia
- Region: Nitra Region
- District: Nové Zámky District
- First mentioned: 1269

Area
  - Total: 23.81 km^{2} (9.19 sq mi)
- Elevation: 193 m (633 ft)

Population (2025)
  - Total: 692
- Time zone: UTC+1 (CET)
  - Summer (DST): UTC+2 (CEST)
- Postal code: 941 49
- Area code: +421 35
- Vehicle registration plate (until 2022): NZ
- Website: www.obecbardonovo.sk

Bardoňovo (Hungarian: Barsbaracska) is a municipality and village in the Nové Zámky District in the Nitra Region in south-west Slovakia.

== History ==
In historical records the village was first mentioned in 1269.

== Geography ==
The municipality lies at an altitude of 193 metres (633 ft) and covers an area of 23.81 km^{2} (9.19 sq mi) (2025).

== Population ==
Population statistic (10 years)
Year	1995	2005	2015	2025
Count	939	859	736	692
Difference		−8.51%	−14.31%	−5.97%

Population statistic
Year	2024	2025
Count	689	692
Difference		+0.43%

It has a population of 692 people (31 December 2025).

=== Ethnicity ===
Census 2021 (1+ %)
Ethnicity	Number	Fraction
Slovak	468	68.62%
Hungarian	216	31.67%
Not found out	22	3.22%
Total	682	

In year 2021 was 682 people by ethnicity 468 as Slovak, 216 as Hungarian, 22 as Not found out, 3 as Czech, 1 as Romani, 1 as Russian, 1 as German and 1 as Other.

Note on population: The difference values of population numbers in the table "Population statistic" and in the sections "Ethnicity" & "Religion" is caused by the use of various statistical methods.

Originally a Magyar settlement, founded at the beginning of the 11th century, just after the "Pozsony Battle", led by Dux Árpád. The original Magyar population's majority was expelled to Hungary and/or brutally deported to the Sudetenland between 1945 and 1949 as a result of the Beneš decrees. They belonged to Reformed (Calvinist) Church. The population is now about 61% Slovak and 39% Hungarian.

=== Religion ===
Census 2021 (1+ %)
Religion	Number	Fraction
Roman Catholic Church	360	52.79%
Calvinist Church	143	20.97%
None	130	19.06%
Not found out	25	3.67%
Evangelical Church	10	1.47%
Total	682	

In year 2021 was 682 people by religion 360 from Roman Catholic Church, 143 from Calvinist Church, 130 from None, 25 from Not found out, 10 from Evangelical Church, 4 from Other, 3 from Greek Catholic Church, 2 from Christian Congregations in Slovakia, 2 from Church of the Brethren, 1 from Other and not ascertained christian church, 1 from Buddhism and 1 from Ad hoc movements.

== Facilities ==
The village has two cemeteries, three pubs and a mansion (Zigmund Kelecsenyi).

== Genealogical resources ==
The records for genealogical research are available at the state archive in Nitra (Slovak: Štátny archív v Nitre).

- Roman Catholic church records (births/marriages/deaths): 1733-1895 (parish B)
- Lutheran church records (births/marriages/deaths): 1785-1896 (parish B)
- Reformated church records (births/marriages/deaths): 1784-1895 (parish B)

== See also ==
- List of municipalities and towns in Slovakia
