= Pozba =

Village and municipality in Slovakia

- Municipality
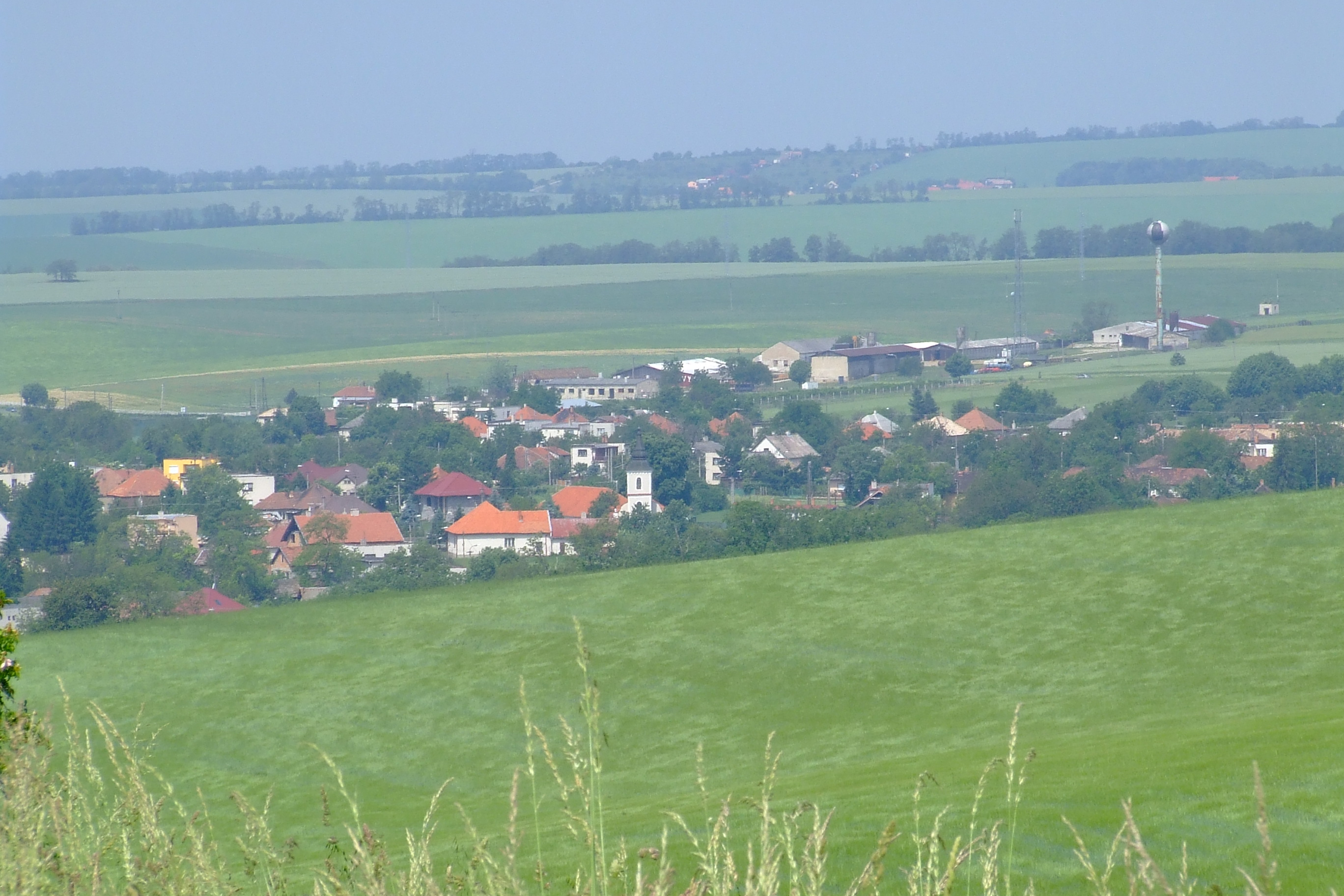

- Flag

- Location of Pozba in the Nitra Region Location of Pozba in Slovakia
- Coordinates: 48.12°N 18.38°E
- Country: Slovakia
- Region: Nitra Region
- District: Nové Zámky District
- First mentioned: 1245

Area
  - Total: 9.40 km^{2} (3.63 sq mi)
- Elevation: 155 m (509 ft)

Population (2025)
  - Total: 444
- Time zone: UTC+1 (CET)
  - Summer (DST): UTC+2 (CEST)
- Postal code: 941 51
- Area code: +421 35
- Vehicle registration plate (until 2022): NZ
- Website: www.pozba.sk

Pozba is a village and municipality in the Nové Zámky District in the Nitra Region of south-west Slovakia.

== History ==
In historical records the village was first mentioned in 1245.

== Geography ==
The municipality lies at an altitude of 155 metres (509 ft) and covers an area of 9.40 km^{2} (3.63 sq mi) (2025).

== Population ==
Population statistic (10 years)
Year	1995	2005	2015	2025
Count	603	552	453	444
Difference		−8.45%	−17.93%	−1.98%

Population statistic
Year	2024	2025
Count	446	444
Difference		−0.44%

It has a population of 444 people (31 December 2025).

=== Ethnicity ===
Census 2021 (1+ %)
Ethnicity	Number	Fraction
Hungarian	326	71.49%
Slovak	147	32.23%
Not found out	9	1.97%
Total	456	

In year 2021 was 456 people by ethnicity 326 as Hungarian, 147 as Slovak, 9 as Not found out and 4 as Czech.

Note on population: The difference values of population numbers in the table "Population statistic" and in the sections "Ethnicity" & "Religion" is caused by the use of various statistical methods.

=== Religion ===
Census 2021 (1+ %)
Religion	Number	Fraction
Calvinist Church	277	60.75%
Roman Catholic Church	75	16.45%
None	74	16.23%
Jehovah's Witnesses	8	1.75%
Not found out	7	1.54%
Evangelical Church	6	1.32%
Total	456	

In year 2021 was 456 people by religion 277 from Calvinist Church, 75 from Roman Catholic Church, 74 from None, 8 from Jehovah's Witnesses, 7 from Not found out, 6 from Evangelical Church, 4 from Greek Catholic Church, 4 from Apostolic Church and 1 from Buddhism.

== Facilities ==
The village has a small public library a swimming pool and a football pitch.
