= Mojzesovo =

Village and municipality in Slovakia

Mojzesovo Özdöge
- Municipality
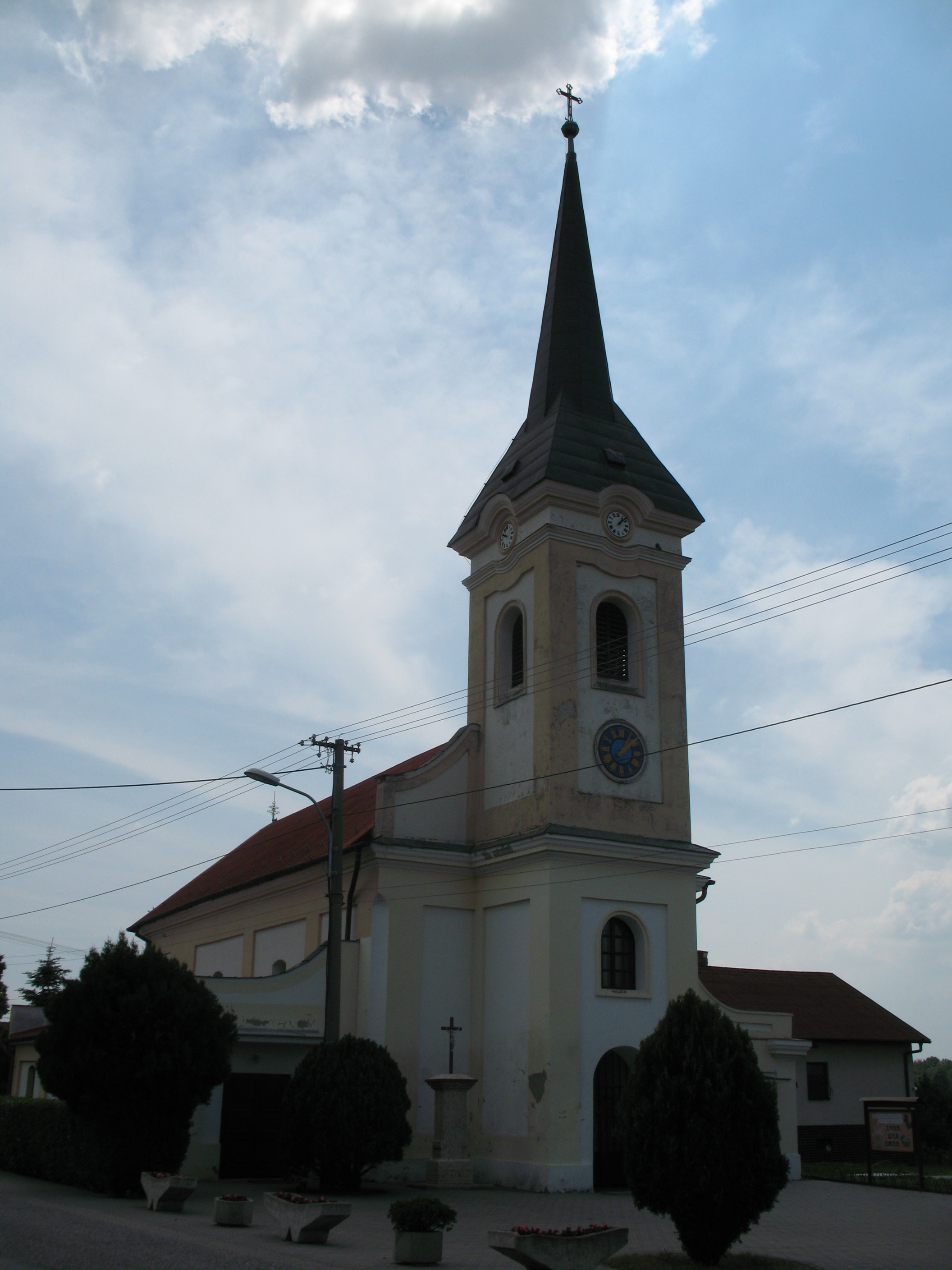

- Flag

- Location of Mojzesovo in the Nitra Region Location of Mojzesovo in Slovakia
- Coordinates: 48.13°N 18.23°E
- Country: Slovakia
- Region: Nitra Region
- District: Nové Zámky District
- First mentioned: 1273

Area
  - Total: 7.49 km^{2} (2.89 sq mi)
- Elevation: 128 m (420 ft)

Population (2025)
  - Total: 1,329
- Time zone: UTC+1 (CET)
  - Summer (DST): UTC+2 (CEST)
- Postal code: 941 04
- Area code: +421 35
- Vehicle registration plate (until 2022): NZ
- Website: mojzesovo.sk

Mojzesovo (Hungarian: Özdöge) is a village and municipality in the Nové Zámky District in the Nitra Region of south-west Slovakia.

== History ==
In historical records the village was first mentioned in 1273.

During its existence, this village was named Izdeg, name of the only family of the village of Mojzesovo who survived from Turkish invasion.

== Geography ==
The municipality lies at an altitude of 128 metres (420 ft) and covers an area of 7.49 km^{2} (2.89 sq mi) (2025).

== Population ==
Population statistic (10 years)
Year	1995	2005	2015	2025
Count	1379	1372	1303	1329
Difference		−0.50%	−5.02%	+1.99%

Population statistic
Year	2024	2025
Count	1326	1329
Difference		+0.22%

It has a population of 1329 people (31 December 2025).

=== Ethnicity ===
Census 2021 (1+ %)
Ethnicity	Number	Fraction
Slovak	1282	95.24%
Not found out	66	4.9%
Total	1346	

In year 2021 was 1346 people by ethnicity 1282 as Slovak, 66 as Not found out, 6 as Hungarian, 2 as Russian, 2 as German, 1 as Czech, 1 as Ukrainian, 1 as Serbian, 1 as Romani and 1 as Austrian.

Note on population: The difference values of population numbers in the table "Population statistic" and in the sections "Ethnicity" & "Religion" is caused by the use of various statistical methods.

=== Religion ===
Census 2021 (1+ %)
Religion	Number	Fraction
Roman Catholic Church	1187	88.19%
None	80	5.94%
Not found out	57	4.23%
Total	1346	

In year 2021 was 1346 people by religion 1187 from Roman Catholic Church, 80 from None, 57 from Not found out, 10 from Evangelical Church, 3 from Christian Congregations in Slovakia, 3 from Greek Catholic Church, 2 from Other, 1 from Eastern Orthodox Church, 1 from Buddhism, 1 from Apostolic Church and 1 from Ad hoc movements.

== Facilities ==
The village has a public library, a gym and football pitch.
