= Dolný Ohaj =

- Municipality
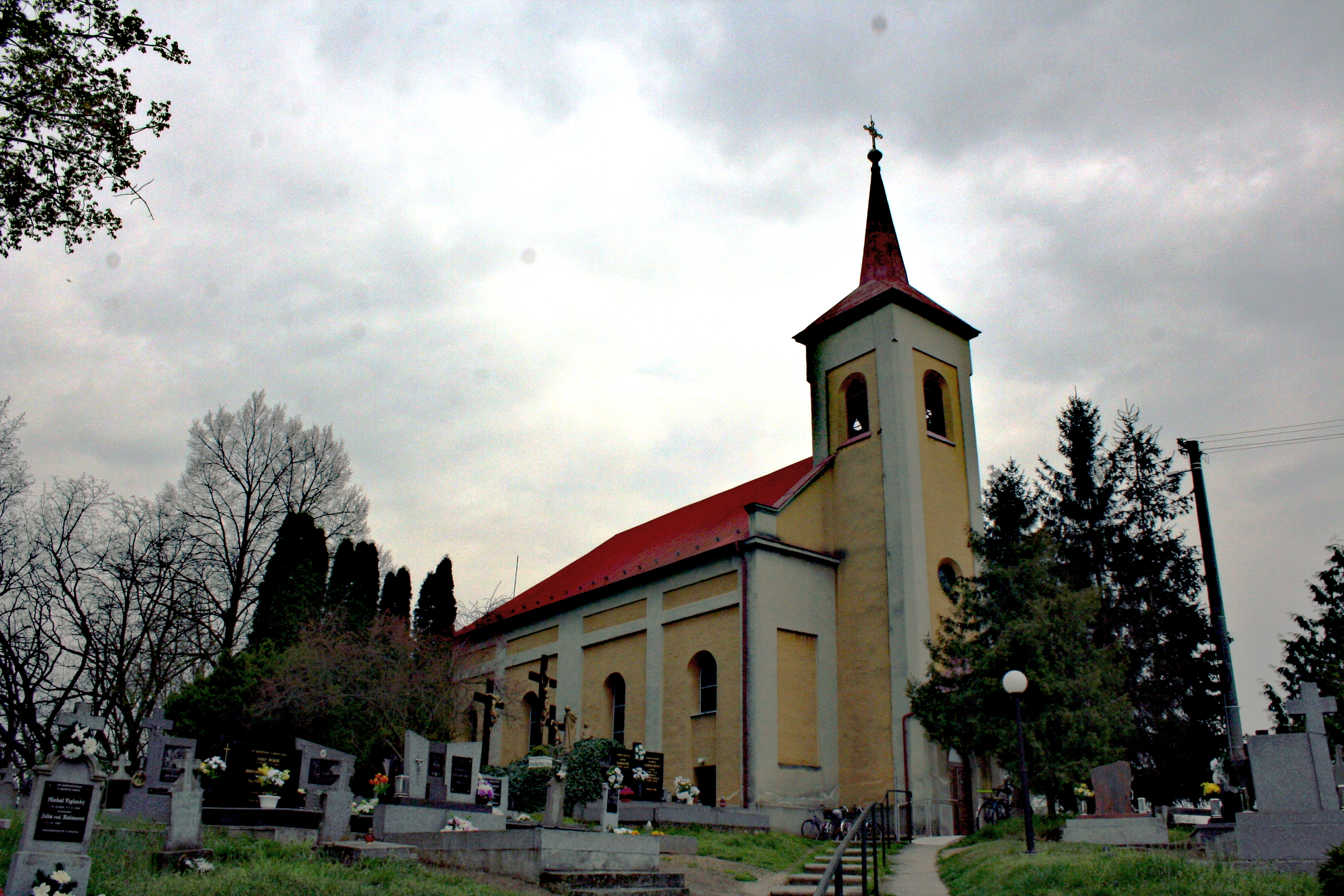

- Flag

- Location of Dolný Ohaj in the Nitra Region Location of Dolný Ohaj in Slovakia
- Coordinates: 48.08°N 18.25°E
- Country: Slovakia
- Region: Nitra Region
- District: Nové Zámky District
- First mentioned: 1293

Area
  - Total: 17.02 km^{2} (6.57 sq mi)
- Elevation: 123 m (404 ft)

Population (2025)
  - Total: 1,447
- Time zone: UTC+1 (CET)
  - Summer (DST): UTC+2 (CEST)
- Postal code: 941 43
- Area code: +421 35
- Vehicle registration plate (until 2022): NZ
- Website: www.obecdolnyohaj.sk

Dolný Ohaj (Hungarian: Ohaj) is a municipality and village in the Nové Zámky District in the Nitra Region of south-west Slovakia.

== History ==
In historical records the village was first mentioned in 1293.

== Geography ==
The municipality lies at an altitude of 123 metres (404 ft) and covers an area of 17.02 km^{2} (6.57 sq mi) (2025).

== Population ==
Population statistic (10 years)
Year	1995	2005	2015	2025
Count	1763	1621	1570	1447
Difference		−8.05%	−3.14%	−7.83%

Population statistic
Year	2024	2025
Count	1468	1447
Difference		−1.43%

It has a population of 1447 people (31 December 2025).

=== Ethnicity ===
Census 2021 (1+ %)
Ethnicity	Number	Fraction
Slovak	1408	93.55%
Not found out	80	5.31%
Total	1505	

In year 2021 was 1505 people by ethnicity 1408 as Slovak, 80 as Not found out, 11 as Hungarian, 6 as Czech, 5 as Romani, 2 as Russian, 2 as German, 2 as Other, 1 as Italian, 1 as Moravian and 1 as Korean.

Note on population: The difference values of population numbers in the table "Population statistic" and in the sections "Ethnicity" & "Religion" is caused by the use of various statistical methods.

=== Religion ===
Census 2021 (1+ %)
Religion	Number	Fraction
Roman Catholic Church	1232	81.86%
None	153	10.17%
Not found out	86	5.71%
Total	1505	

In year 2021 was 1505 people by religion 1232 from Roman Catholic Church, 153 from None, 86 from Not found out, 12 from Evangelical Church, 7 from Christian Congregations in Slovakia, 4 from Greek Catholic Church, 4 from Ad hoc movements, 3 from Other, 2 from Calvinist Church, 1 from Eastern Orthodox Church and 1 from Buddhism.

== Facilities ==
The village has a public library.

== Genealogical resources ==
The records for genealogical research are available at the state archive "Statny Archiv in Nitra, Slovakia"

- Roman Catholic church records (births/marriages/deaths): 1787-1895 (parish A)
- Reformated church records (births/marriages/deaths): 1785-1951 (parish B)

== See also ==
- List of municipalities and towns in Slovakia
