= Pavlová =

Pavlová Garampáld
- Municipality
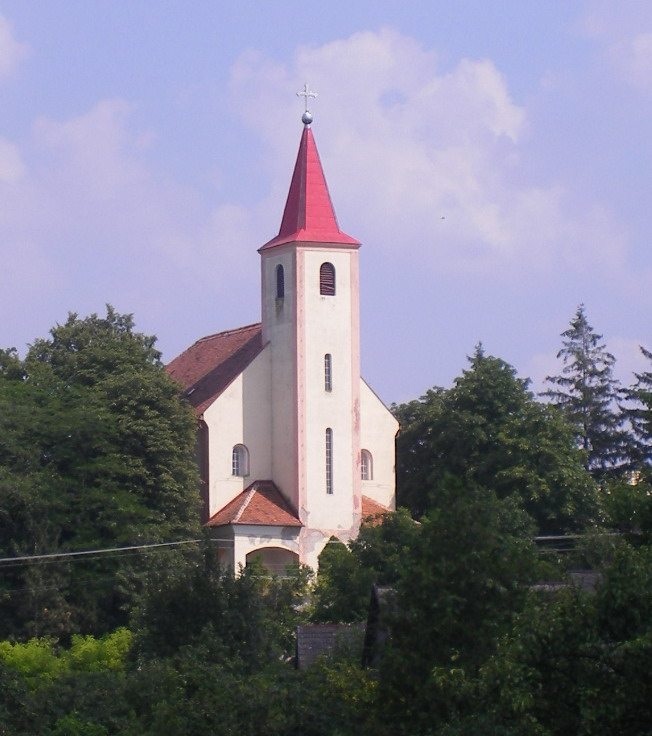

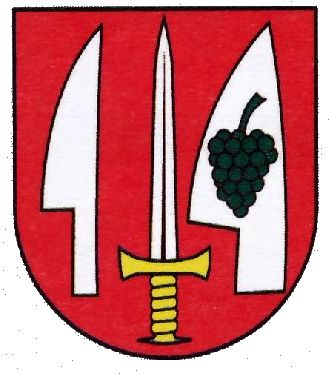
- Flag Coat of arms

- Location of Pavlová in the Nitra Region Location of Pavlová in Slovakia
- Coordinates: 47.90°N 18.67°E
- Country: Slovakia
- Region: Nitra Region
- District: Nové Zámky District
- First mentioned: 1135

Area
  - Total: 7.61 km^{2} (2.94 sq mi)
- Elevation: 126 m (413 ft)

Population (2025)
  - Total: 200
- Time zone: UTC+1 (CET)
  - Summer (DST): UTC+2 (CEST)
- Postal code: 943 59
- Area code: +421 36
- Vehicle registration plate (until 2022): NZ
- Website: www.obecpavlova.sk

Pavlová (Hungarian: Garampáld) is a village and municipality in the Nové Zámky District in the Nitra Region of south-west Slovakia.

== History ==
In historical records the village was first mentioned in 1135, under the name Pauli.

== Geography ==
The municipality lies at an altitude of 126 metres (413 ft) and covers an area of 7.61 km^{2} (2.94 sq mi) (2025).

== Population ==
Population statistic (10 years)
Year	1995	2005	2015	2025
Count	317	264	231	200
Difference		−16.71%	−12.5%	−13.41%

Population statistic
Year	2024	2025
Count	205	200
Difference		−2.43%

It has a population of 200 people (31 December 2025).

=== Ethnicity ===
Census 2021 (1+ %)
Ethnicity	Number	Fraction
Hungarian	191	89.67%
Slovak	22	10.32%
Not found out	10	4.69%
Total	213	

In year 2021 was 213 people by ethnicity 191 as Hungarian, 22 as Slovak, 10 as Not found out, 1 as Czech, 1 as Romani and 1 as Polish.

Note on population: The difference values of population numbers in the table "Population statistic" and in the sections "Ethnicity" & "Religion" is caused by the use of various statistical methods.

=== Religion ===
Census 2021 (1+ %)
Religion	Number	Fraction
Roman Catholic Church	190	89.2%
None	13	6.1%
Not found out	6	2.82%
Total	213	

In year 2021 was 213 people by religion 190 from Roman Catholic Church, 13 from None, 6 from Not found out, 2 from Christian Congregations in Slovakia, 1 from Calvinist Church and 1 from Evangelical Church.

== Facilities ==
The village has a small public library and a football pitch. The Roman Catholic church of St. Lawrence was founded in the village in 1810.
