= Jatov =

Village and municipality in Slovakia

- Municipality
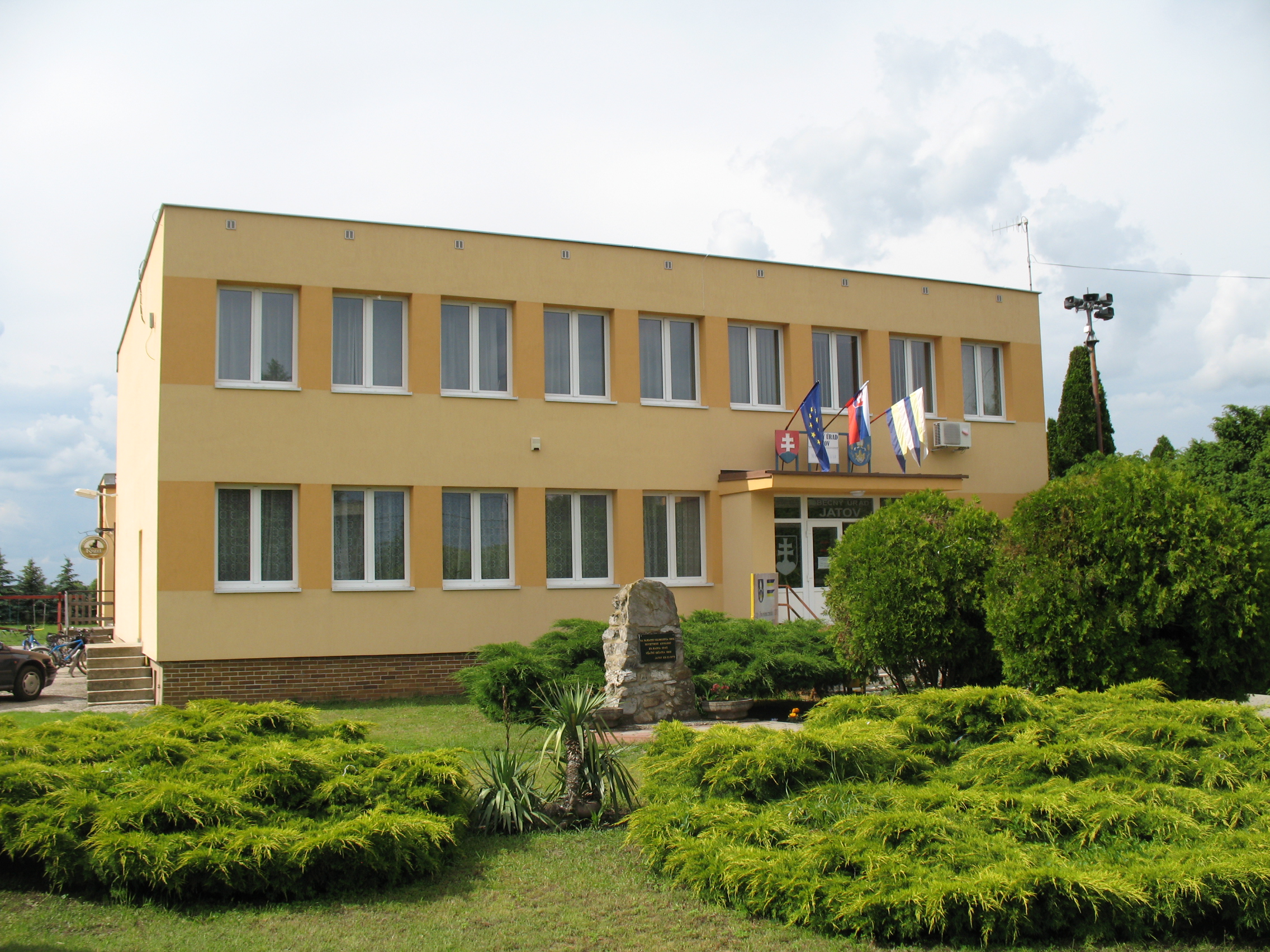

- Flag

- Location of Jatov in the Nitra Region Location of Jatov in Slovakia
- Coordinates: 48.13°N 18.02°E
- Country: Slovakia
- Region: Nitra Region
- District: Nové Zámky District
- First mentioned: 1952

Area
  - Total: 18.65 km^{2} (7.20 sq mi)
- Elevation: 115 m (377 ft)

Population (2025)
  - Total: 717
- Time zone: UTC+1 (CET)
  - Summer (DST): UTC+2 (CEST)
- Postal code: 941 09
- Area code: +421 35
- Vehicle registration plate (until 2022): NZ
- Website: www.obecjatov.sk

Jatov (Hungarian: Jattó) is a village and municipality in the Nové Zámky District in the Nitra Region of south-west Slovakia.

== History ==
The municipality and village is a recent establishment built in 1952.

== Geography ==
The municipality lies at an altitude of 115 metres (377 ft) and covers an area of 18.65 km^{2} (7.20 sq mi) (2025).

== Population ==
Population statistic (10 years)
Year	1995	2005	2015	2025
Count	763	789	779	717
Difference		+3.40%	−1.26%	−7.95%

Population statistic
Year	2024	2025
Count	713	717
Difference		+0.56%

It has a population of 717 people (31 December 2025).

=== Ethnicity ===
Census 2021 (1+ %)
Ethnicity	Number	Fraction
Slovak	657	92.14%
Hungarian	36	5.04%
Not found out	25	3.5%
Total	713	

In year 2021 was 713 people by ethnicity 657 as Slovak, 36 as Hungarian, 25 as Not found out, 2 as Czech, 2 as Ukrainian, 2 as Serbian, 1 as Austrian, 1 as Other and 1 as Croatian.

Note on population: The difference values of population numbers in the table "Population statistic" and in the sections "Ethnicity" & "Religion" is caused by the use of various statistical methods.

=== Religion ===
Census 2021 (1+ %)
Religion	Number	Fraction
Roman Catholic Church	415	58.2%
None	208	29.17%
Not found out	29	4.07%
Evangelical Church	19	2.66%
Ad hoc movements	11	1.54%
Christian Congregations in Slovakia	10	1.4%
Total	713	

In year 2021 was 713 people by religion 415 from Roman Catholic Church, 208 from None, 29 from Not found out, 19 from Evangelical Church, 11 from Ad hoc movements, 10 from Christian Congregations in Slovakia, 7 from Other and not ascertained christian church, 4 from Eastern Orthodox Church, 3 from Islam, 3 from Greek Catholic Church, 1 from Jewish community, 1 from Calvinist Church, 1 from Jehovah's Witnesses and 1 from Other.

== Facilities ==
The village has a public library, a football pitch, and a gym.

== Genealogical resources ==
The records for genealogical research are available at the state archive "Statny Archiv in Nitra, Slovakia"

- Roman Catholic church records (births/marriages/deaths): 1761–1896 (parish B)
- Lutheran church records (births/marriages/deaths): 1887–1954 (parish B)
- Reformated church records (births/marriages/deaths): 1806–1895 (parish B)

== See also ==
- List of municipalities and towns in Slovakia
