= Úľany nad Žitavou =

Úľany nad Žitavou Zsitvafödémes
- Municipality
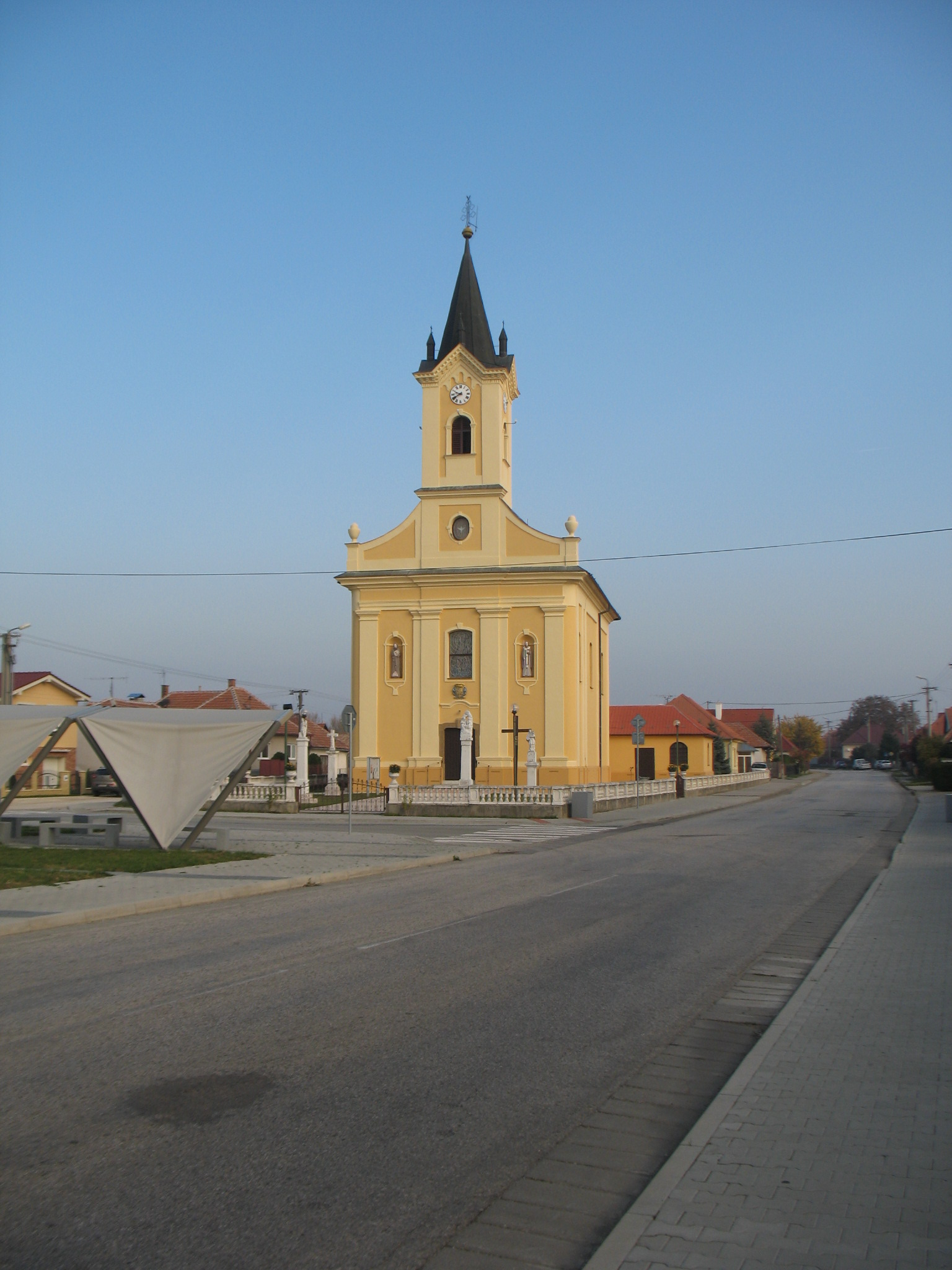

- Flag

- Location of Úľany nad Žitavou in the Nitra Region Location of Úľany nad Žitavou in Slovakia
- Coordinates: 48.10°N 18.25°E
- Country: Slovakia
- Region: Nitra Region
- District: Nové Zámky District
- First mentioned: 1284

Area
  - Total: 8.39 km^{2} (3.24 sq mi)
- Elevation: 126 m (413 ft)

Population (2025)
  - Total: 1,553
- Time zone: UTC+1 (CET)
  - Summer (DST): UTC+2 (CEST)
- Postal code: 942 03
- Area code: +421 35
- Vehicle registration plate (until 2022): NZ
- Website: www.ulanynadzitavou.sk

Úľany nad Žitavou (Hungarian: Zsitvafödémes) is a village and municipality in the Nové Zámky District in the Nitra Region of south-west Slovakia. It is also known as Fedýmeš nad Žitavou.

== History ==
In historical records the village was first mentioned in 1284.

== Geography ==
The municipality lies at an altitude of 126 metres (413 ft) and covers an area of 8.39 km^{2} (3.24 sq mi) (2025).

== Population ==
Population statistic (10 years)
Year	1995	2005	2015	2025
Count	1504	1537	1527	1553
Difference		+2.19%	−0.65%	+1.70%

Population statistic
Year	2024	2025
Count	1548	1553
Difference		+0.32%

It has a population of 1553 people (31 December 2025).

=== Ethnicity ===
Census 2021 (1+ %)
Ethnicity	Number	Fraction
Slovak	1487	96.99%
Not found out	45	2.93%
Total	1533	

In year 2021 was 1533 people by ethnicity 1487 as Slovak, 45 as Not found out, 9 as Czech, 5 as Other, 4 as Russian, 4 as Hungarian, 2 as Ukrainian, 2 as Romanian, 1 as Jewish, 1 as Romani, 1 as Polish, 1 as German and 1 as English.

Note on population: The difference values of population numbers in the table "Population statistic" and in the sections "Ethnicity" & "Religion" is caused by the use of various statistical methods.

=== Religion ===
Census 2021 (1+ %)
Religion	Number	Fraction
Roman Catholic Church	1292	84.28%
None	167	10.89%
Not found out	45	2.94%
Total	1533	

In year 2021 was 1533 people by religion 1292 from Roman Catholic Church, 167 from None, 45 from Not found out, 8 from Evangelical Church, 5 from Greek Catholic Church, 3 from Eastern Orthodox Church, 3 from Christian Congregations in Slovakia, 3 from Ad hoc movements, 2 from Other and not ascertained christian church, 2 from Jehovah's Witnesses, 2 from Other and 1 from Apostolic Church.

== Facilities ==
The village has a small public library a gym and football pitch.
