= Nové Zámky District =

Coordinates: 47°59′10″N 18°9′51″E

- District
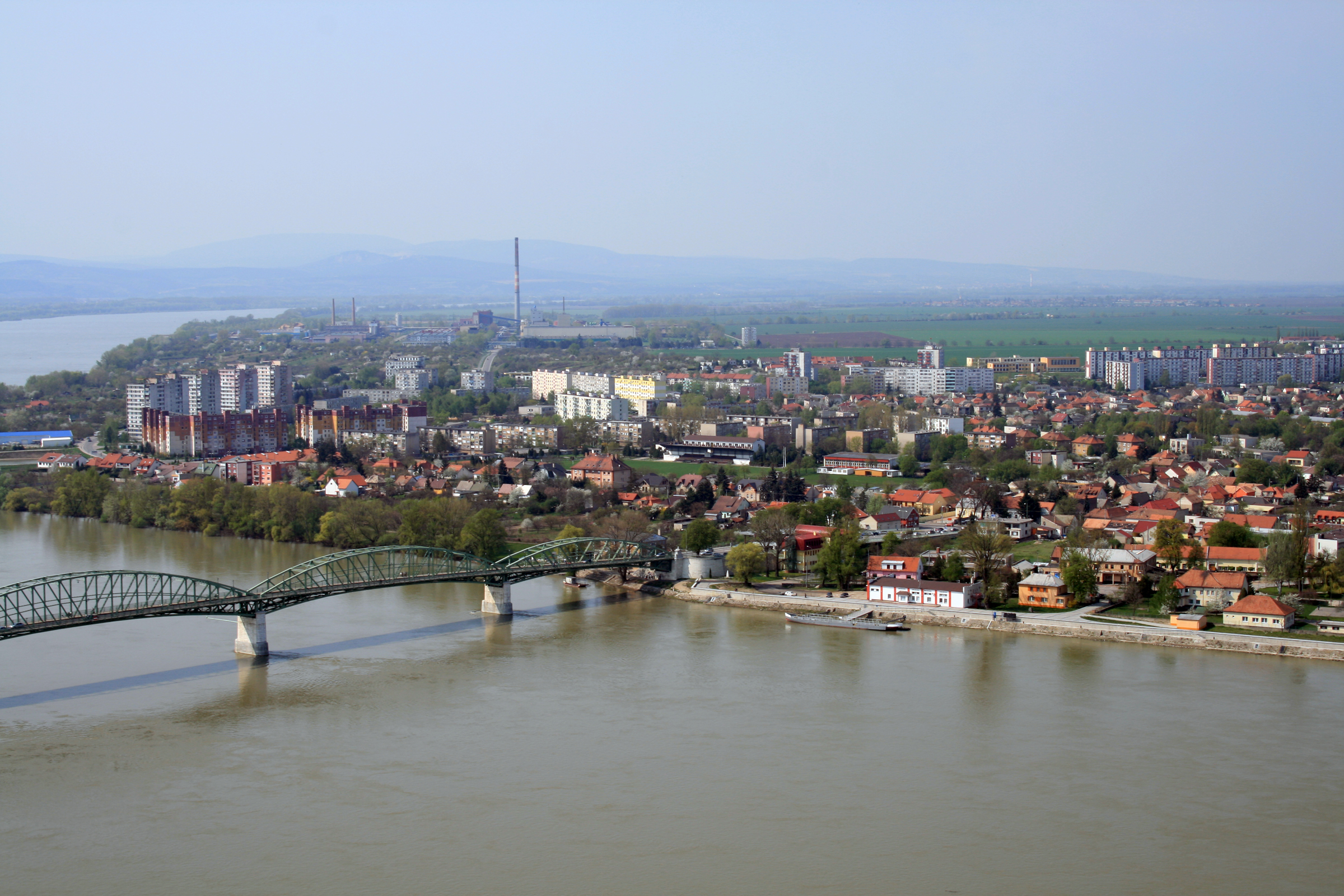
- Country: Slovakia
- Region: Nitra Region
- Seat: Nové Zámky

Area
  - Total: 1,347.03 km^{2} (520.09 sq mi)

Population (2025)
  - Total: 133,309
- Time zone: UTC+1 (CET)
  - Summer (DST): UTC+2 (CEST)
- Telephone prefix: 035
- Vehicle registration plate (until 2022): NZ
- Municipalities: 62

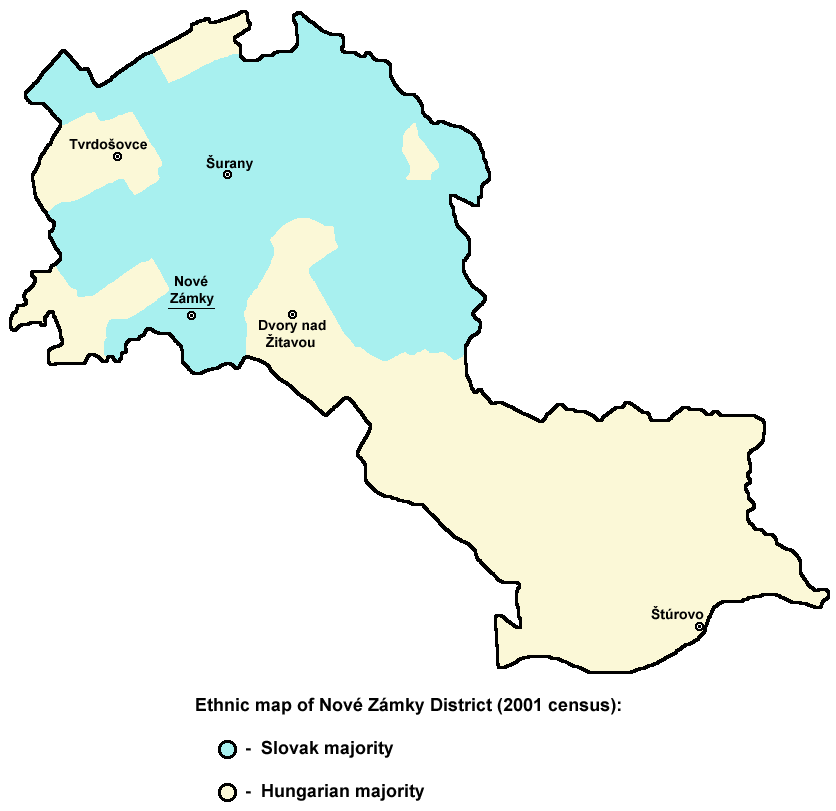
Ethnic map of Nové Zámky District (2001 census) - data by municipalities.

Nové Zámky District (Slovak: okres Nové Zámky) is a district in the Nitra Region of western Slovakia. Until 1918, the area of the district was split between several counties of the Kingdom of Hungary: the largest area in the north formed part of Nitra; an area in the south between Dvory nad Žitavou and Strekov formed part of Komárno; an area in the north-east around Veľké Lovce formed part of Tekov; a sizable area in the east formed part of Esztergom (Ostrihom); and a small area around Salka formed part of Hont County.

== Population ==
Population statistic (10 years)
Year	1995	2005	2015	2025
Count	152,380	147,703	141,574	133,309
Difference		−3.06%	−4.14%	−5.83%

Population statistic
Year	2024	2025
Count	134,231	133,309
Difference		−0.68%

It has a population of 133,309 people (31 December 2025).

Historical population
Year	Pop.	±%
1970	148,601	—
1980	153,199	+3.1%
1991	153,466	+0.2%
2001	149,594	−2.5%
2011	144,417	−3.5%
2021	138,168	−4.3%
Source: Statistical Office of the Slovak Republic

=== Ethnicity ===
Census 2021 (1+ %)
Ethnicity	Number	Fraction
Slovak	86,265	59.26%
Hungarian	46,802	32.15%
Not found out	9490	6.51%
Total	145,557	

In year 2021 was 145,557 people by ethnicity 86,265 as Slovak, 46,802 as Hungarian, 9490 as Not found out, 851 as Czech, 826 as Romani, 373 as Other, 158 as Russian, 101 as German, 84 as Ukrainian, 77 as Vietnamese, 59 as Polish, 53 as Rusyn, 50 as English, 40 as Chinese, 35 as Italian, 35 as Croatian, 34 as Jewish, 31 as Bulgarian, 30 as Turkish, 24 as Serbian, 20 as Albanian, 19 as Romanian, 19 as Austrian, 19 as Moravian, 15 as Greek, 14 as Irish, 14 as French, 8 as Korean, 6 as Canadian, 4 as Silesian and 1 as Iranian.

Note on population: The difference values of population numbers in the table "Population statistic" and in the sections "Ethnicity" & "Religion" is caused by the use of various statistical methods.

=== Religion ===
Census 2021 (1+ %)
Religion	Number	Fraction
Roman Catholic Church	89,079	64.47%
None	30,142	21.82%
Not found out	10,339	7.48%
Calvinist Church	3244	2.35%
Evangelical Church	1903	1.38%
Total	138,168	

In year 2021 was 138,168 people by religion 89,079 from Roman Catholic Church, 30,142 from None, 10,339 from Not found out, 3244 from Calvinist Church, 1903 from Evangelical Church, 720 from Greek Catholic Church, 630 from Christian Congregations in Slovakia, 321 from Jehovah's Witnesses, 296 from Ad hoc movements, 279 from Other, 221 from Other and not ascertained christian church, 182 from Buddhism, 159 from Apostolic Church, 144 from Eastern Orthodox Church, 120 from Baptists Church, 92 from Islam, 57 from Paganism and natural spirituality, 57 from United Methodist Church, 55 from Jewish community, 43 from Old Catholic Church, 22 from Seventh-day Adventist Church, 21 from Hinduism, 14 from Church of the Brethren, 13 from Church of Jesus Christ of Latter-day Saints, 8 from Bahá'i Community, 6 from Czechoslovak Hussite Church and 1 from New Apostolic Church.

== Municipalities ==
Municipality	Area [km^{2}]	Population
Andovce	10.77	1,837
Bajtava	9.32	384
Bánov	19.76	3,515
Bardoňovo	23.81	692
Belá	8.69	319
Bešeňov	17.09	1,532
Bíňa	23.50	1,404
Branovo	9.32	585
Bruty	20.53	598
Čechy	11.84	268
Černík	13.38	1,085
Dedinka	18.51	623
Dolný Ohaj	17.02	1,447
Dubník	41.00	1,499
Dvory nad Žitavou	63.84	4,955
Gbelce	26.61	2,036
Hul	12.62	1,227
Chľaba	13.86	695
Jasová	19.94	1,106
Jatov	18.65	717
Kamenica nad Hronom	18.79	1,217
Kamenín	28.05	1,434
Kamenný Most	20.33	1,038
Kmeťovo	5.19	785
Kolta	25.83	1,232
Komjatice	30.75	4,184
Komoča	13.47	918
Leľa	8.23	312
Lipová	13.62	1,509
Ľubá	9.39	396
Malá nad Hronom	7.72	377
Malé Kosihy	8.42	363
Maňa	21.59	1,946
Michal nad Žitavou	8.18	684
Mojzesovo	7.49	1,329
Mužla	52.09	1,819
Nána	17.94	1,176
Nová Vieska	17.48	647
Nové Zámky	72.56	35,628
Obid	0.00	1,122
Palárikovo	51.29	4,197
Pavlová	7.61	200
Podhájska	11.11	1,059
Pozba	9.40	444
Radava	7.59	736
Rastislavice	19.58	954
Rúbaň	16.10	886
Salka	26.25	994
Semerovo	23.40	1,297
Sikenička	13.91	420
Strekov	41.05	1,866
Svodín	53.60	2,356
Šarkan	13.63	375
Štúrovo	37.22	9,221
Šurany	59.81	9,001
Trávnica	21.15	1,049
Tvrdošovce	55.55	5,035
Úľany nad Žitavou	8.39	1,553
Veľké Lovce	25.84	1,723
Veľký Kýr	23.63	2,899
Vlkas	6.69	304
Zemné	26.34	2,100

Population and area values are current for year 2025.
