= Hul, Nové Zámky District =

Municipality and village in Slovakia

Hul
- Municipality
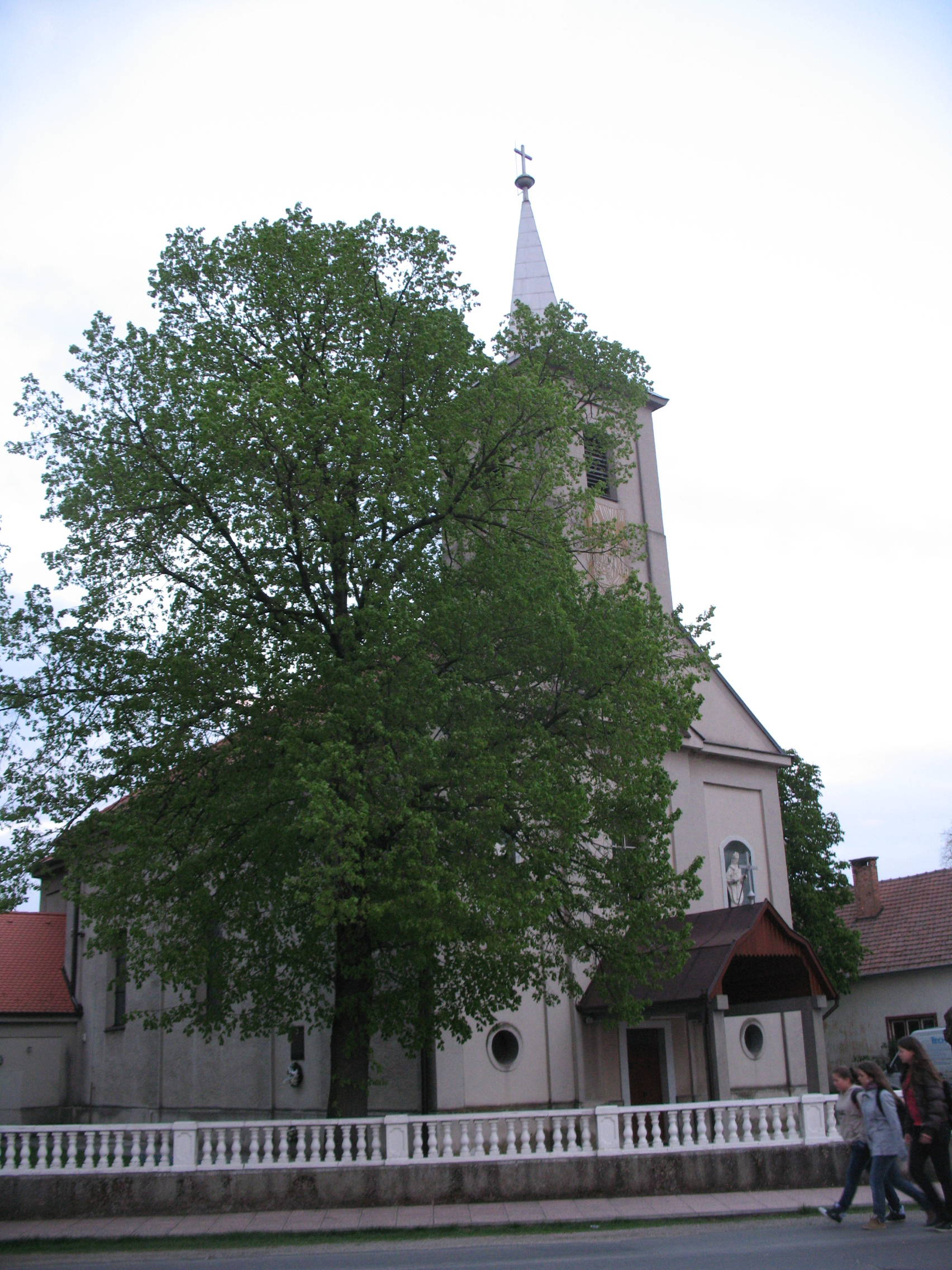

- Flag

- Location of Hul in the Nitra Region Location of Hul in Slovakia
- Coordinates: 48.10°N 18.27°E
- Country: Slovakia
- Region: Nitra Region
- District: Nové Zámky District
- First mentioned: 1290

Area
  - Total: 12.62 km^{2} (4.87 sq mi)
- Elevation: 128 m (420 ft)

Population (2025)
  - Total: 1,227
- Time zone: UTC+1 (CET)
  - Summer (DST): UTC+2 (CEST)
- Postal code: 941 44
- Area code: +421 35
- Vehicle registration plate (until 2022): NZ
- Website: www.hul.sk

Hul (Hungarian: Hull) is a municipality and village in the Nové Zámky District in the Nitra Region of south-west Slovakia.

== History ==
In historical records the village was first mentioned in 1290.

== Geography ==
The municipality lies at an altitude of 128 metres (420 ft) and covers an area of 12.62 km^{2} (4.87 sq mi) (2025).

== Population ==
Population statistic (10 years)
Year	1995	2005	2015	2025
Count	1257	1220	1182	1227
Difference		−2.94%	−3.11%	+3.80%

Population statistic
Year	2024	2025
Count	1212	1227
Difference		+1.23%

It has a population of 1227 people (31 December 2025).

=== Ethnicity ===
Census 2021 (1+ %)
Ethnicity	Number	Fraction
Slovak	1169	96.45%
Not found out	39	3.21%
Total	1212	

In year 2021 was 1212 people by ethnicity 1169 as Slovak, 39 as Not found out, 9 as Hungarian, 5 as Other, 4 as Russian, 3 as Czech, 3 as Polish, 1 as Ukrainian, 1 as Italian, 1 as Romani, 1 as Rusyn, 1 as Romanian, 1 as German and 1 as English.

Note on population: The difference values of population numbers in the table "Population statistic" and in the sections "Ethnicity" & "Religion" is caused by the use of various statistical methods.

=== Religion ===
Census 2021 (1+ %)
Religion	Number	Fraction
Roman Catholic Church	1021	84.24%
None	111	9.16%
Not found out	36	2.97%
Total	1212	

In year 2021 was 1212 people by religion 1021 from Roman Catholic Church, 111 from None, 36 from Not found out, 12 from Evangelical Church, 11 from Calvinist Church, 8 from Greek Catholic Church, 5 from Ad hoc movements, 2 from Other and not ascertained christian church, 2 from Other, 1 from Eastern Orthodox Church, 1 from Paganism and natural spirituality, 1 from Jehovah's Witnesses and 1 from Christian Congregations in Slovakia.

== Facilities ==
The village has a public library.

== Genealogical resources ==
The records for genealogical research are available at the state archive "Statny Archiv in Nitra, Slovakia"

- Roman Catholic church records (births/marriages/deaths): 1737-1895 (parish B)

== See also ==
- List of municipalities and towns in Slovakia
