= Branovo =

Branovo Kisbaromlak
- Municipality
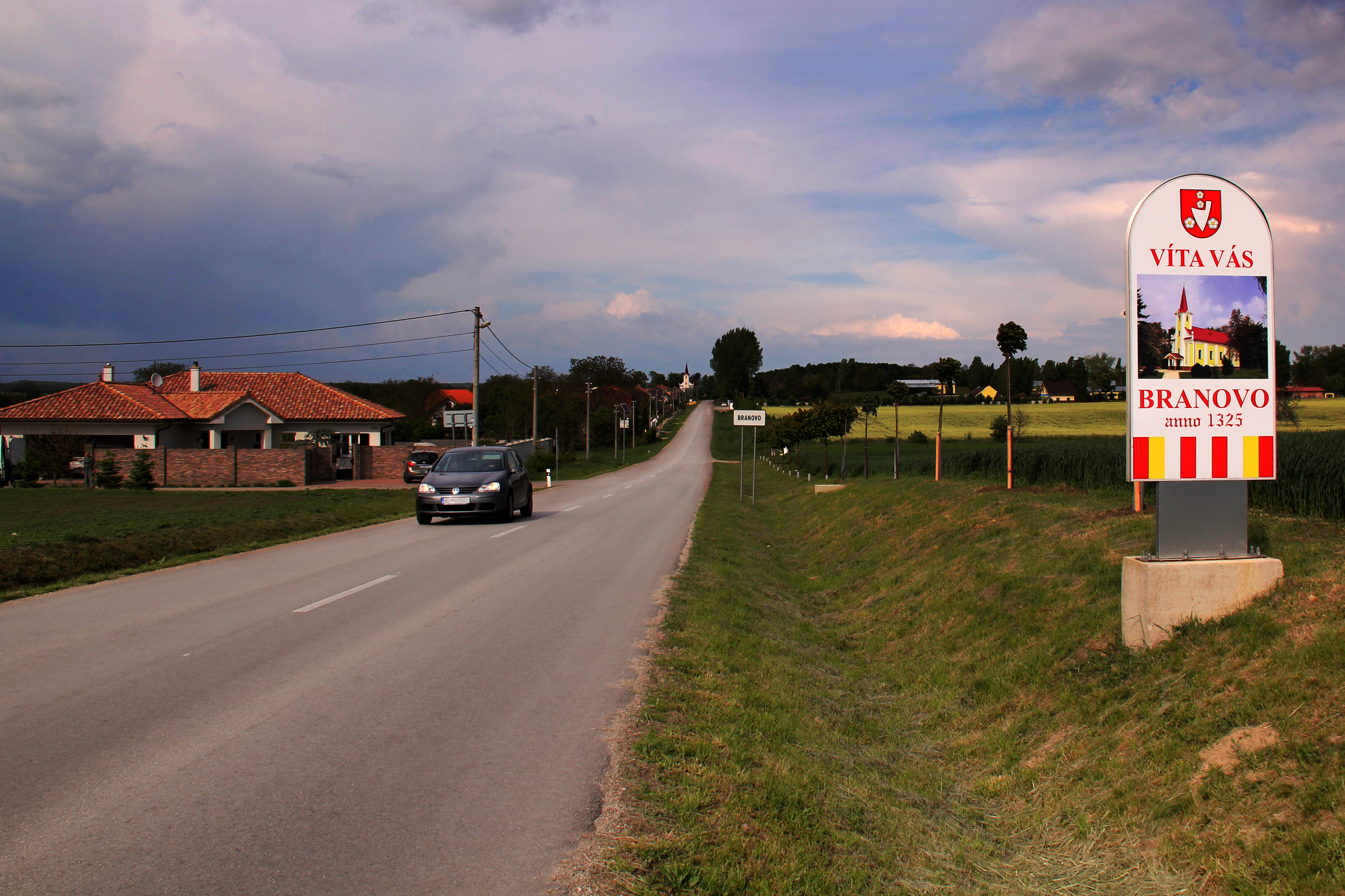

- Flag

- Location of Branovo in the Nitra Region Location of Branovo in Slovakia
- Coordinates: 48.03°N 18.30°E
- Country: Slovakia
- Region: Nitra Region
- District: Nové Zámky District
- First mentioned: 1418

Area
  - Total: 9.32 km^{2} (3.60 sq mi)
- Elevation: 128 m (420 ft)

Population (2025)
  - Total: 585
- Time zone: UTC+1 (CET)
  - Summer (DST): UTC+2 (CEST)
- Postal code: 941 31
- Area code: +421 35
- Vehicle registration plate (until 2022): NZ
- Website: www.branovo.sk

Branovo (Hungarian: Kisbaromlak) is a municipality and village in the Nové Zámky District in the Nitra Region of south-west Slovakia.

== History ==
In historical records the village was first mentioned in 1418.

== Geography ==
The municipality lies at an altitude of 128 metres (420 ft) and covers an area of 9.32 km^{2} (3.60 sq mi) (2025).

== Population ==
Population statistic (10 years)
Year	1995	2005	2015	2025
Count	555	573	589	585
Difference		+3.24%	+2.79%	−0.67%

Population statistic
Year	2024	2025
Count	577	585
Difference		+1.38%

It has a population of 585 people (31 December 2025).

=== Ethnicity ===
Census 2021 (1+ %)
Ethnicity	Number	Fraction
Slovak	545	94.12%
Hungarian	31	5.35%
Not found out	9	1.55%
Total	579	

In year 2021 was 579 people by ethnicity 545 as Slovak, 31 as Hungarian, 9 as Not found out, 5 as English, 3 as Czech, 1 as German and 1 as Other.

Note on population: The difference values of population numbers in the table "Population statistic" and in the sections "Ethnicity" & "Religion" is caused by the use of various statistical methods.

=== Religion ===
Census 2021 (1+ %)
Religion	Number	Fraction
Roman Catholic Church	452	78.07%
None	98	16.93%
Not found out	7	1.21%
Evangelical Church	6	1.04%
Total	579	

In year 2021 was 579 people by religion 452 from Roman Catholic Church, 98 from None, 7 from Not found out, 6 from Evangelical Church, 4 from Calvinist Church, 3 from Jehovah's Witnesses, 2 from Christian Congregations in Slovakia, 2 from Greek Catholic Church, 2 from Buddhism, 1 from Paganism and natural spirituality, 1 from Other and 1 from Apostolic Church.

== Facilities ==
The village has a public library and football pitch.

== Genealogical resources ==
The records for genealogical research are available at the state archive "Statny Archiv in Nitra, Slovakia"

== See also ==
- List of municipalities and towns in Slovakia
