= Sikenička =

Village and municipality in Slovakia

Sikenička Kisgyarmat
- Municipality
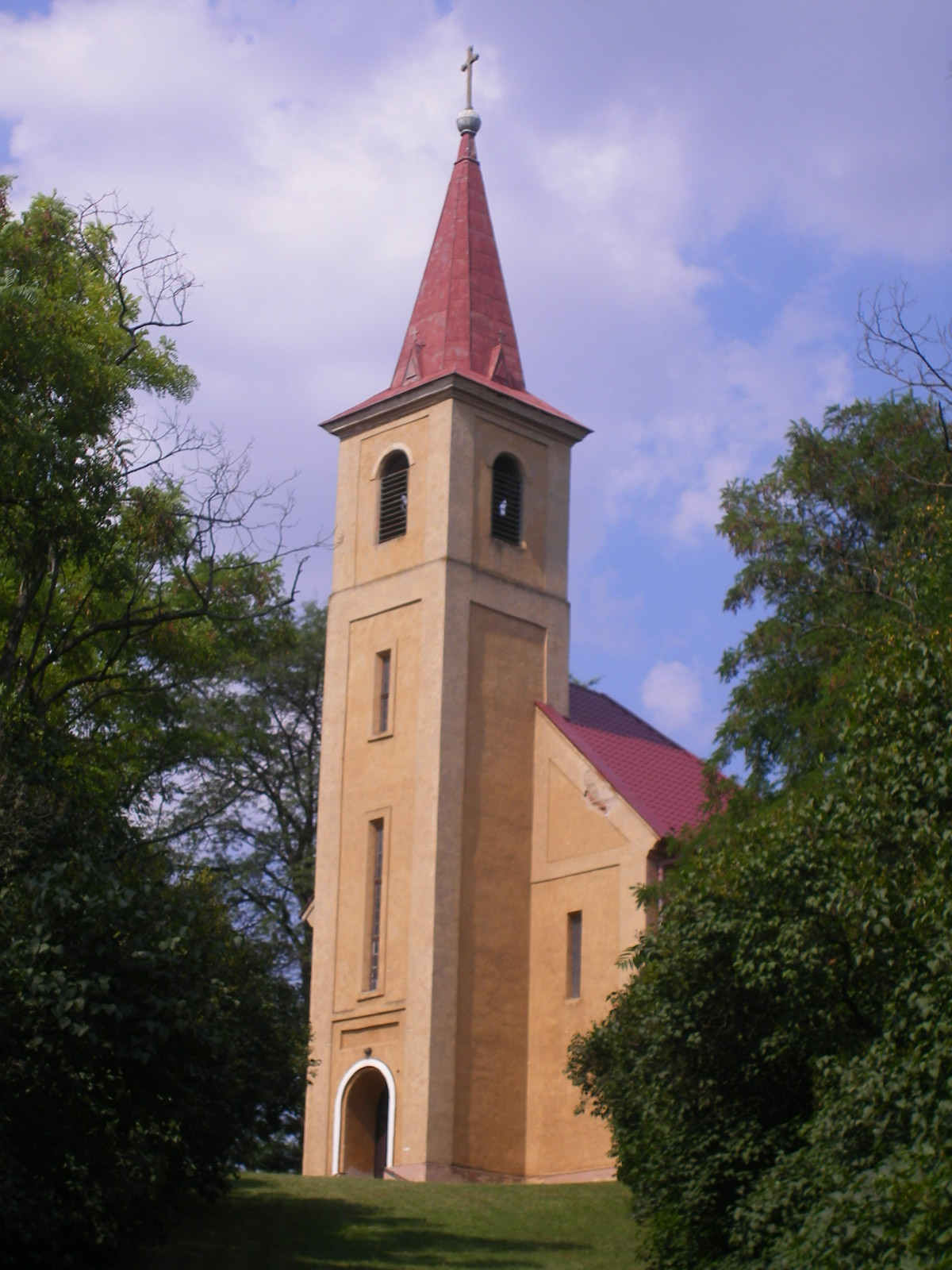

- Flag

- Location of Sikenička in the Nitra Region Location of Sikenička in Slovakia
- Coordinates: 47.93°N 18.68°E
- Country: Slovakia
- Region: Nitra Region
- District: Nové Zámky District
- First mentioned: 1135

Area
  - Total: 13.91 km^{2} (5.37 sq mi)
- Elevation: 121 m (397 ft)

Population (2025)
  - Total: 420
- Time zone: UTC+1 (CET)
  - Summer (DST): UTC+2 (CEST)
- Postal code: 943 59
- Area code: +421 36
- Vehicle registration plate (until 2022): NZ
- Website: www.sikenicka.sk

Sikenička (Hungarian: Kisgyarmat) is a village and municipality in the Nové Zámky District in the Nitra Region of south-west Slovakia.

== History ==
In historical records the village was first mentioned in 1135.

== Geography ==
The municipality lies at an altitude of 121 metres (397 ft) and covers an area of 13.91 km^{2} (5.37 sq mi) (2025).

== Population ==
Population statistic (10 years)
Year	1995	2005	2015	2025
Count	491	454	436	420
Difference		−7.53%	−3.96%	−3.66%

Population statistic
Year	2024	2025
Count	432	420
Difference		−2.77%

It has a population of 420 people (31 December 2025).

=== Ethnicity ===
Census 2021 (1+ %)
Ethnicity	Number	Fraction
Hungarian	382	87.61%
Slovak	55	12.61%
Not found out	32	7.33%
Total	436	

In year 2021 was 436 people by ethnicity 382 as Hungarian, 55 as Slovak, 32 as Not found out, 1 as Romani and 1 as Polish.

Note on population: The difference values of population numbers in the table "Population statistic" and in the sections "Ethnicity" & "Religion" is caused by the use of various statistical methods.

=== Religion ===
Census 2021 (1+ %)
Religion	Number	Fraction
Roman Catholic Church	342	78.44%
None	47	10.78%
Not found out	25	5.73%
Calvinist Church	12	2.75%
Evangelical Church	8	1.83%
Total	436	

In year 2021 was 436 people by religion 342 from Roman Catholic Church, 47 from None, 25 from Not found out, 12 from Calvinist Church, 8 from Evangelical Church, 1 from Christian Congregations in Slovakia and 1 from Greek Catholic Church.

== Facilities ==
The village has a small public library and football pitch.
