= Ľubá =

Village and municipality in Slovakia

Ľubá Libád
- Municipality
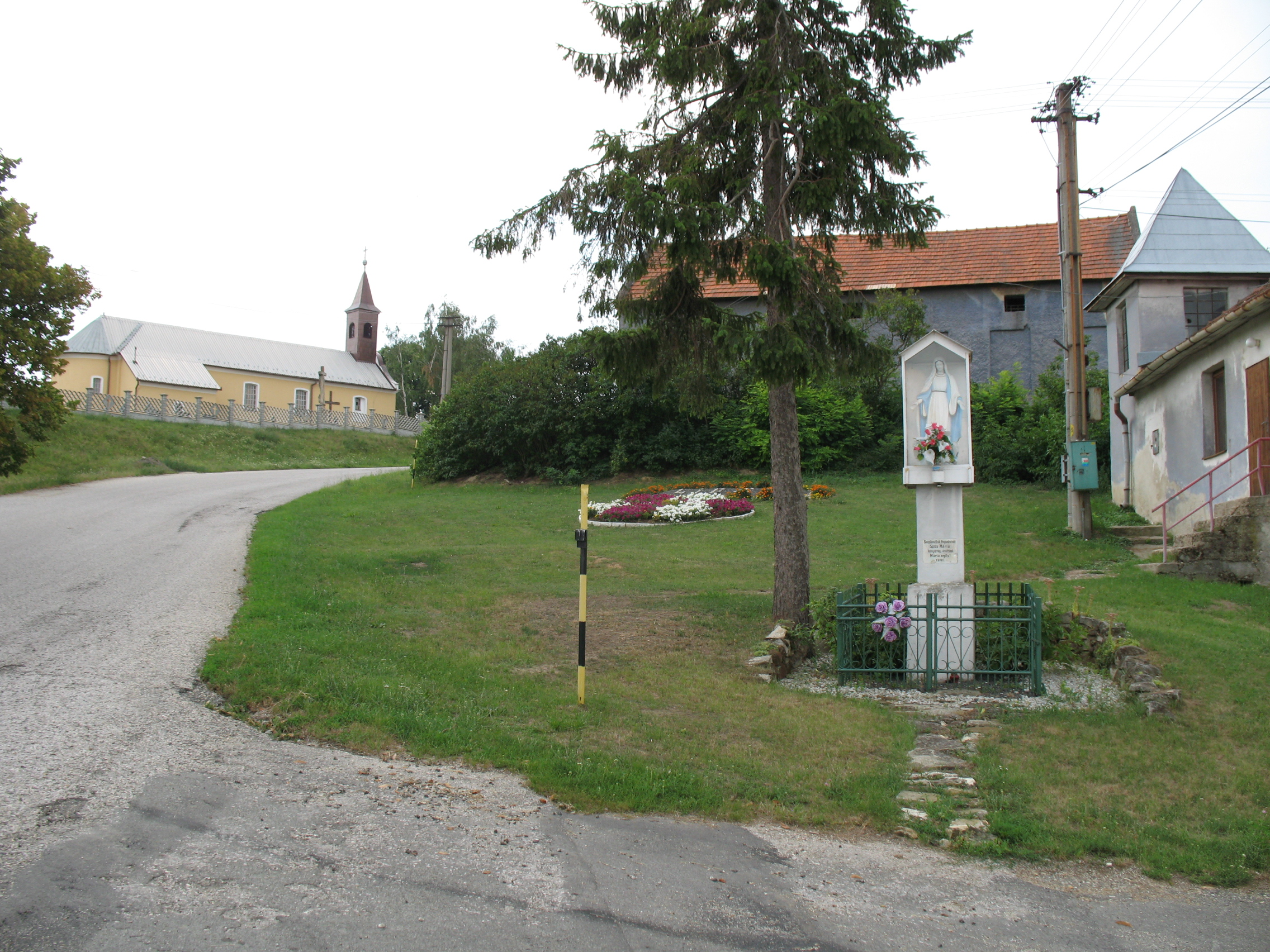

- Flag

- Location of Ľubá in the Nitra Region Location of Ľubá in Slovakia
- Coordinates: 47.85°N 18.60°E
- Country: Slovakia
- Region: Nitra Region
- District: Nové Zámky District
- First mentioned: 1247

Area
  - Total: 9.39 km^{2} (3.63 sq mi)
- Elevation: 159 m (522 ft)

Population (2025)
  - Total: 396
- Time zone: UTC+1 (CET)
  - Summer (DST): UTC+2 (CEST)
- Postal code: 943 53
- Area code: +421 36
- Vehicle registration plate (until 2022): NZ
- Website: www.obecluba.eu

Ľubá (Hungarian: Libád) is a village and municipality in the Nové Zámky District in the Nitra Region of south-west Slovakia.

== History ==
In historical records, the village was first mentioned in 1247.

== Geography ==
The municipality lies at an altitude of 159 metres (522 ft) and covers an area of 9.39 km^{2} (3.63 sq mi) (2025).

== Population ==
Population statistic (10 years)
| Year | 1995 | 2005 | 2015 | 2025 |
|---|---|---|---|---|
| Count | 434 | 446 | 422 | 396 |
| Difference | | +2.76% | −5.38% | −6.16% |

Population statistic
| Year | 2024 | 2025 |
|---|---|---|
| Count | 407 | 396 |
| Difference | | −2.70% |

It has a population of 396 people (31 December 2025).

=== Ethnicity ===
Census 2021 (1+ %)
| Ethnicity | Number | Fraction |
|---|---|---|
| Hungarian | 291 | 72.02% |
| Slovak | 101 | 25% |
| Not found out | 33 | 8.16% |
| Total | 404 | |

In year 2021 was 404 people by ethnicity 291 as Hungarian, 101 as Slovak, 33 as Not found out, 2 as Romani, 2 as Other, 1 as Ukrainian and 1 as Romanian.

Note on population: The difference values of population numbers in the table "Population statistic" and in the sections "Ethnicity" & "Religion" is caused by the use of various statistical methods.

=== Religion ===
Census 2021 (1+ %)
| Religion | Number | Fraction |
|---|---|---|
| Roman Catholic Church | 269 | 66.58% |
| None | 90 | 22.28% |
| Not found out | 25 | 6.19% |
| Evangelical Church | 7 | 1.73% |
| Total | 404 | |

In year 2021 was 404 people by religion 269 from Roman Catholic Church, 90 from None, 25 from Not found out, 7 from Evangelical Church, 4 from Greek Catholic Church, 3 from Calvinist Church, 3 from Jehovah's Witnesses, 2 from Christian Congregations in Slovakia and 1 from Eastern Orthodox Church.

== Facilities ==
The village has a public library, a DVD rental store, and a football pitch.
