= Rúbaň =

Rúbaň Fűr
- Municipality
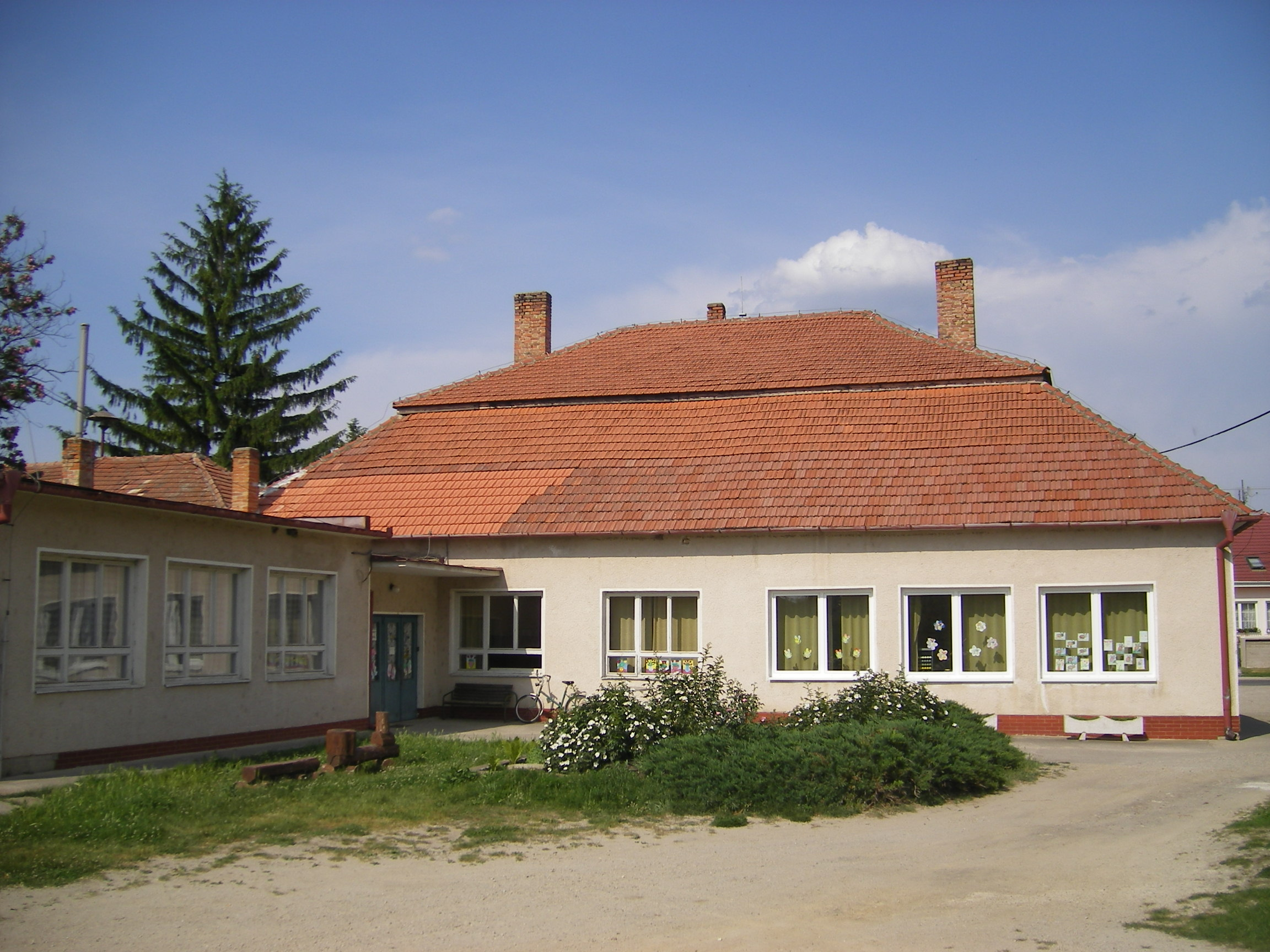

- Flag Coat of arms

- Location of Rúbaň in the Nitra Region Location of Rúbaň in Slovakia
- Coordinates: 47.93°N 18.40°E
- Country: Slovakia
- Region: Nitra Region
- District: Nové Zámky District
- First mentioned: 1268

Area
  - Total: 16.10 km^{2} (6.22 sq mi)
- Elevation: 135 m (443 ft)

Population (2025)
  - Total: 886
- Time zone: UTC+1 (CET)
  - Summer (DST): UTC+2 (CEST)
- Postal code: 941 36
- Area code: +421 35
- Vehicle registration plate (until 2022): NZ
- Website: www.obecruban.sk

Rúbaň (Hungarian: Fűr) is a village and municipality in the Nové Zámky District in the Nitra Region of south-west Slovakia.

== History ==
In historical records the village was first mentioned in 1268.

== Geography ==
The municipality lies at an altitude of 135 metres (443 ft) and covers an area of 16.10 km^{2} (6.22 sq mi) (2025).

== Population ==
Population statistic (10 years)
Year	1995	2005	2015	2025
Count	1075	938	1002	886
Difference		−12.74%	+6.82%	−11.57%

Population statistic
Year	2024	2025
Count	901	886
Difference		−1.66%

It has a population of 886 people (31 December 2025).

=== Ethnicity ===
Census 2021 (1+ %)
Ethnicity	Number	Fraction
Hungarian	635	68.57%
Slovak	293	31.64%
Not found out	46	4.96%
Romani	10	1.07%
Total	926	

In year 2021 was 926 people by ethnicity 635 as Hungarian, 293 as Slovak, 46 as Not found out, 10 as Romani, 2 as Czech, 2 as German, 1 as French, 1 as Bulgarian and 1 as English.

Note on population: The difference values of population numbers in the table "Population statistic" and in the sections "Ethnicity" & "Religion" is caused by the use of various statistical methods.

=== Religion ===
Census 2021 (1+ %)
Religion	Number	Fraction
Roman Catholic Church	735	79.37%
None	109	11.77%
Not found out	29	3.13%
Calvinist Church	21	2.27%
Greek Catholic Church	11	1.19%
Evangelical Church	11	1.19%
Total	926	

In year 2021 was 926 people by religion 735 from Roman Catholic Church, 109 from None, 29 from Not found out, 21 from Calvinist Church, 11 from Greek Catholic Church, 11 from Evangelical Church, 3 from Christian Congregations in Slovakia, 2 from Other and not ascertained christian church, 2 from Buddhism, 1 from Eastern Orthodox Church, 1 from Islam and 1 from Other.

== Facilities ==
The village has a small public library and a football pitch.
