= Malé Kosihy =

Village and municipality in Slovakia

Malé Kosihy Ipolykiskeszi
- Municipality
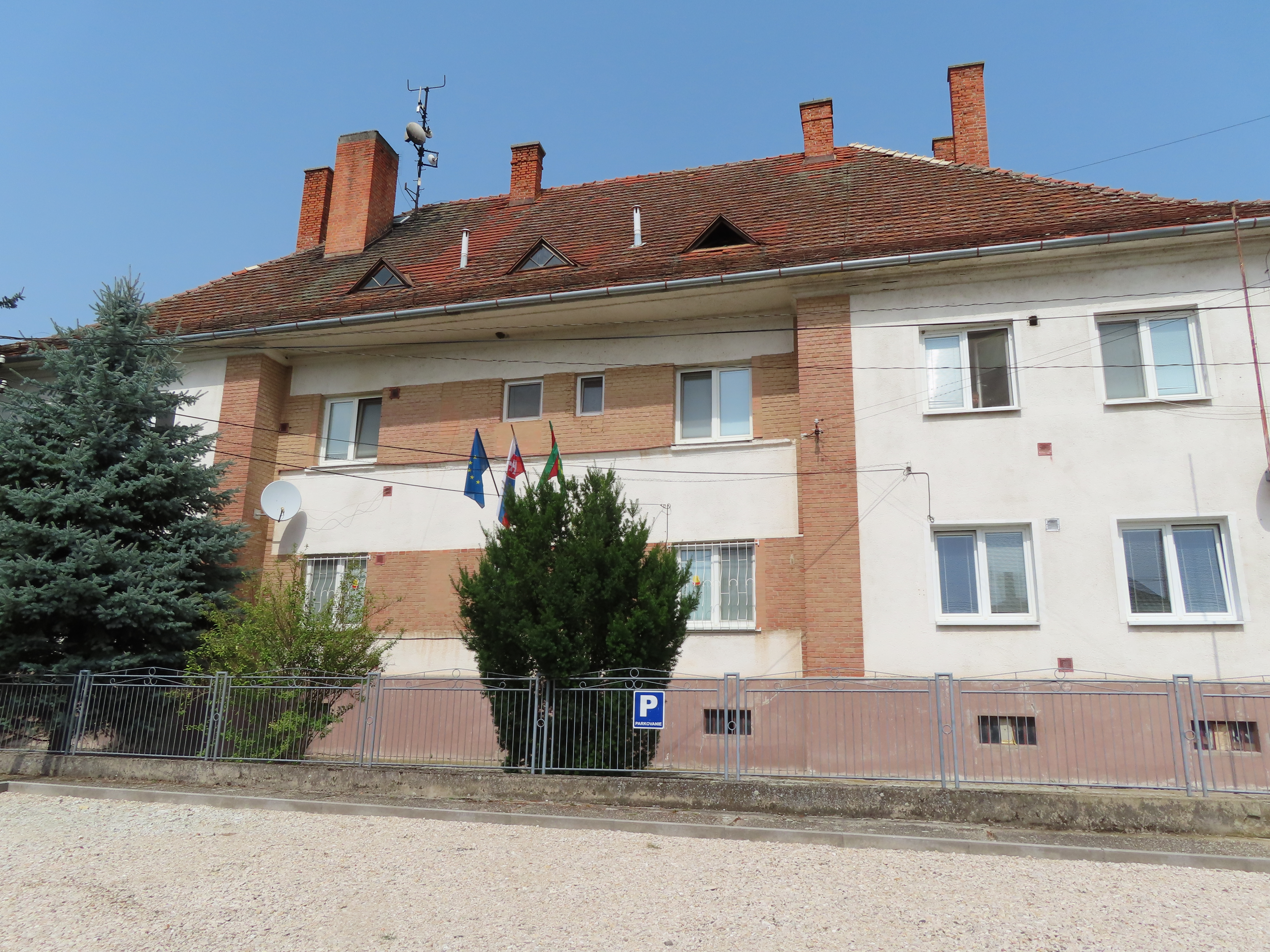

- Flag

- Location of Malé Kosihy in the Nitra Region Location of Malé Kosihy in Slovakia
- Coordinates: 47.75°N 17.88°E
- Country: Slovakia
- Region: Nitra Region
- District: Nové Zámky District
- First mentioned: 1248

Area
  - Total: 8.42 km^{2} (3.25 sq mi)
- Elevation: 112 m (367 ft)

Population (2025)
  - Total: 363
- Time zone: UTC+1 (CET)
  - Summer (DST): UTC+2 (CEST)
- Postal code: 943 61
- Area code: +421 36
- Vehicle registration plate (until 2022): NZ
- Website: malekosihy.sk

Malé Kosihy (Hungarian: Ipolykiskeszi) is a village and municipality in the Nové Zámky District in the Nitra Region of south-west Slovakia.

== Etymology ==
The name Kosihy is derived from the name of old Magyar tribe Keszi guarding the area.

== History ==
In historical records the village was first mentioned in 1248 (Keseu).

== Geography ==
The municipality lies at an altitude of 112 metres (367 ft) and covers an area of 8.42 km^{2} (3.25 sq mi) (2025).

== Population ==
Population statistic (10 years)
Year	1995	2005	2015	2025
Count	441	382	391	363
Difference		−13.37%	+2.35%	−7.16%

Population statistic
Year	2024	2025
Count	364	363
Difference		−0.27%

It has a population of 363 people (31 December 2025).

=== Ethnicity ===
Census 2021 (1+ %)
Ethnicity	Number	Fraction
Hungarian	314	82.84%
Slovak	57	15.03%
Not found out	35	9.23%
Total	379	

In year 2021 was 379 people by ethnicity 314 as Hungarian, 57 as Slovak, 35 as Not found out and 2 as Other.

Note on population: The difference values of population numbers in the table "Population statistic" and in the sections "Ethnicity" & "Religion" is caused by the use of various statistical methods.

=== Religion ===
Census 2021 (1+ %)
Religion	Number	Fraction
Roman Catholic Church	285	75.2%
None	44	11.61%
Not found out	28	7.39%
Calvinist Church	8	2.11%
Church of the Brethren	6	1.58%
Other and not ascertained christian church	5	1.32%
Total	379	

In year 2021 was 379 people by religion 285 from Roman Catholic Church, 44 from None, 28 from Not found out, 8 from Calvinist Church, 6 from Church of the Brethren, 5 from Other and not ascertained christian church and 3 from Jehovah's Witnesses.

== Facilities ==
The village has a public library and a football pitch.
