= Radava =

Radava Rendve
- Municipality
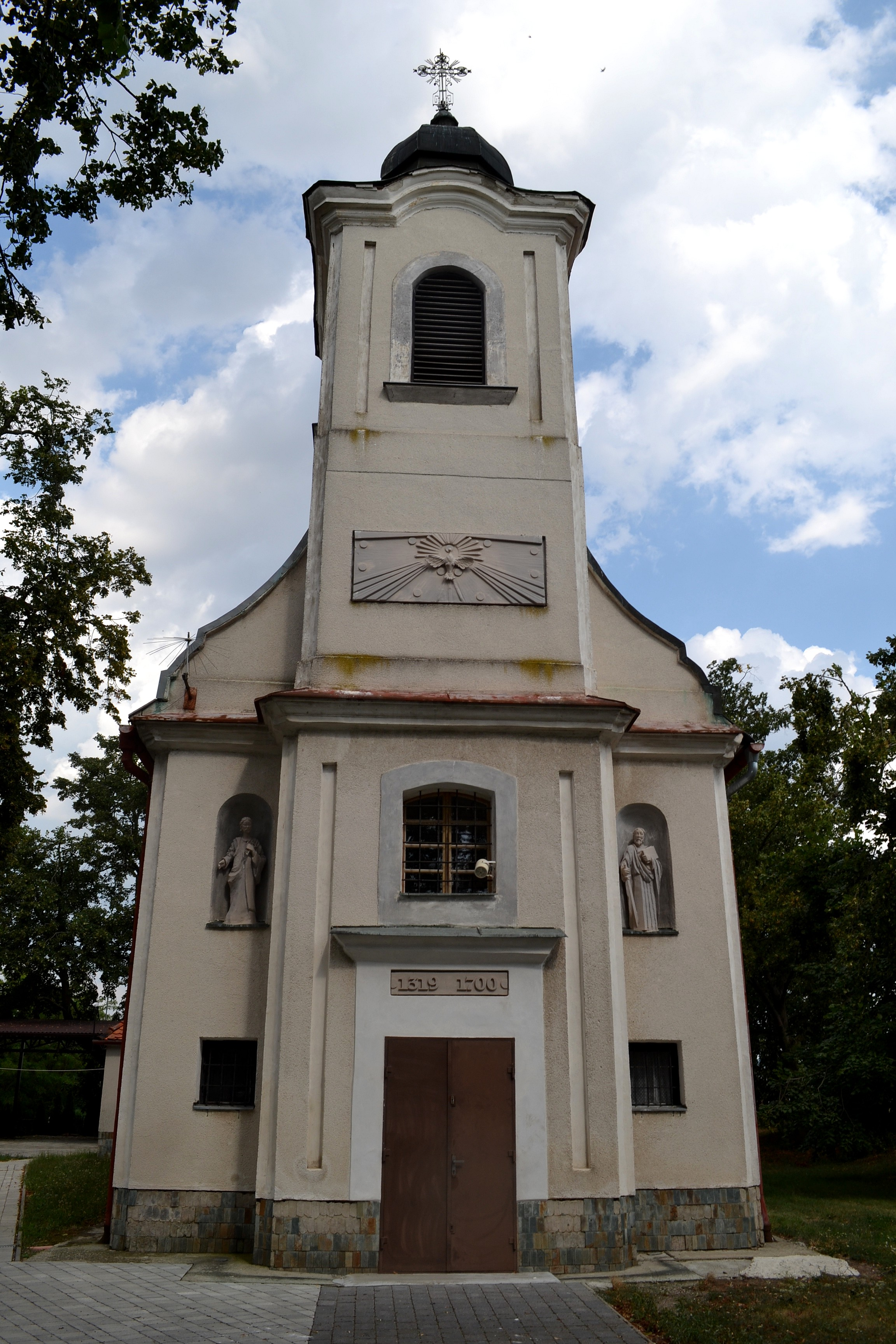

- Flag

- Location of Radava in the Nitra Region Location of Radava in Slovakia
- Coordinates: 48.10°N 18.30°E
- Country: Slovakia
- Region: Nitra Region
- District: Nové Zámky District
- First mentioned: 1237

Area
  - Total: 7.59 km^{2} (2.93 sq mi)
- Elevation: 142 m (466 ft)

Population (2025)
  - Total: 736
- Time zone: UTC+1 (CET)
  - Summer (DST): UTC+2 (CEST)
- Postal code: 941 47
- Area code: +421 35
- Vehicle registration plate (until 2022): NZ
- Website: www.radava.sk

Radava (Hungarian: Rendve) is a village and municipality in the Nové Zámky District in the Nitra Region of south-west Slovakia.

== History ==
In historical records the village was first mentioned in 1237.

== Geography ==
The municipality lies at an altitude of 142 metres (466 ft) and covers an area of 7.59 km^{2} (2.93 sq mi) (2025).

== Population ==
Population statistic (10 years)
| Year | 1995 | 2005 | 2015 | 2025 |
|---|---|---|---|---|
| Count | 964 | 836 | 765 | 736 |
| Difference | | −13.27% | −8.49% | −3.79% |

Population statistic
| Year | 2024 | 2025 |
|---|---|---|
| Count | 740 | 736 |
| Difference | | −0.54% |

It has a population of 736 people (31 December 2025).

=== Ethnicity ===
Census 2021 (1+ %)
| Ethnicity | Number | Fraction |
|---|---|---|
| Slovak | 738 | 97.49% |
| Not found out | 17 | 2.24% |
| Total | 757 | |

In year 2021 was 757 people by ethnicity 738 as Slovak, 17 as Not found out, 6 as Czech, 5 as English, 4 as Other and 2 as Hungarian.

Note on population: The difference values of population numbers in the table "Population statistic" and in the sections "Ethnicity" & "Religion" is caused by the use of various statistical methods.

=== Religion ===
Census 2021 (1+ %)
| Religion | Number | Fraction |
|---|---|---|
| Roman Catholic Church | 617 | 81.51% |
| None | 102 | 13.47% |
| Not found out | 16 | 2.11% |
| Evangelical Church | 10 | 1.32% |
| Total | 757 | |

In year 2021 was 757 people by religion 617 from Roman Catholic Church, 102 from None, 16 from Not found out, 10 from Evangelical Church, 3 from Greek Catholic Church, 2 from Other, 2 from Ad hoc movements, 1 from Calvinist Church, 1 from Paganism and natural spirituality, 1 from Other and not ascertained christian church, 1 from Christian Congregations in Slovakia and 1 from Buddhism.

== Facilities ==
The village has a small public library, a gym and a football pitch.
