= Dedinka =

Municipality and village in Slovakia

Dedinka Fajkürt
- Municipality
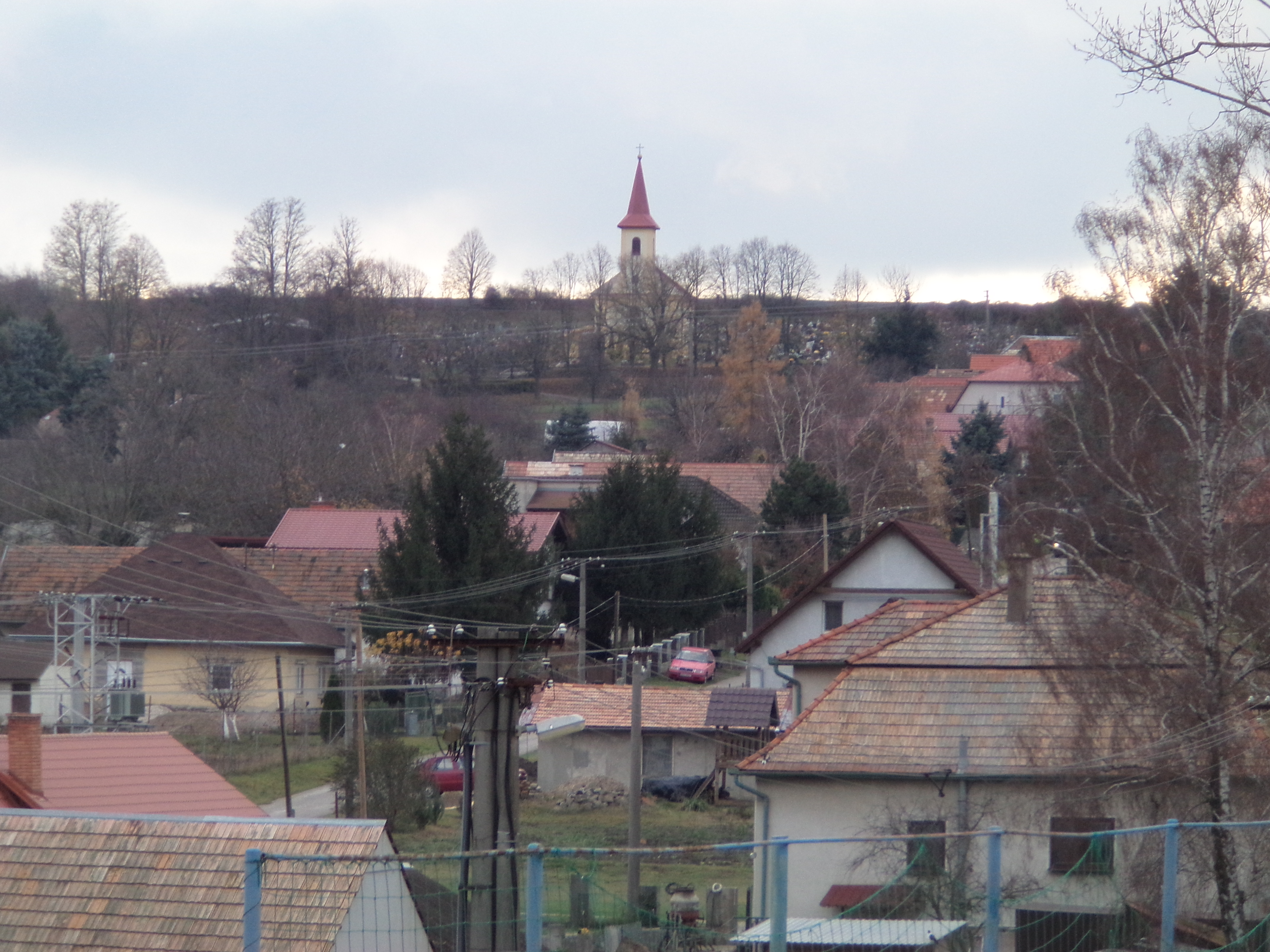

- Flag

- Location of Dedinka in the Nitra Region Location of Dedinka in Slovakia
- Coordinates: 48.07°N 18.43°E
- Country: Slovakia
- Region: Nitra Region
- District: Nové Zámky District
- First mentioned: 1227

Area
  - Total: 18.51 km^{2} (7.15 sq mi)
- Elevation: 194 m (636 ft)

Population (2025)
  - Total: 623
- Time zone: UTC+1 (CET)
  - Summer (DST): UTC+2 (CEST)
- Postal code: 941 50
- Area code: +421 35
- Vehicle registration plate (until 2022): NZ
- Website: www.dedinka.sk

Dedinka (Hungarian: Fajkürt) is a municipality and village in the Nové Zámky District in the Nitra Region of south-west Slovakia.

== History ==
In historical records the village was first mentioned in 1227.

== Geography ==
The municipality lies at an altitude of 194 metres (636 ft) and covers an area of 18.51 km^{2} (7.15 sq mi) (2025).

== Population ==
Population statistic (10 years)
Year	1995	2005	2015	2025
Count	862	826	728	623
Difference		−4.17%	−11.86%	−14.42%

Population statistic
Year	2024	2025
Count	632	623
Difference		−1.42%

It has a population of 623 people (31 December 2025).

=== Ethnicity ===
Census 2021 (1+ %)
Ethnicity	Number	Fraction
Slovak	652	96.3%
Not found out	21	3.1%
Hungarian	8	1.18%
Czech	7	1.03%
Total	677	

In year 2021 was 677 people by ethnicity 652 as Slovak, 21 as Not found out, 8 as Hungarian, 7 as Czech, 3 as German and 1 as Russian.

Note on population: The difference values of population numbers in the table "Population statistic" and in the sections "Ethnicity" & "Religion" is caused by the use of various statistical methods.

=== Religion ===
Census 2021 (1+ %)
Religion	Number	Fraction
Roman Catholic Church	548	80.95%
None	91	13.44%
Not found out	25	3.69%
Total	677	

In year 2021 was 677 people by religion 548 from Roman Catholic Church, 91 from None, 25 from Not found out, 5 from Evangelical Church, 2 from Other, 2 from Greek Catholic Church, 2 from Ad hoc movements, 1 from Calvinist Church and 1 from Christian Congregations in Slovakia.

== Facilities ==
The village has a public library and football pitch.

== Genealogical resources ==
The records for genealogical research are available at the state archive "Statny Archiv in Nitra, Slovakia"

- Roman Catholic church records (births/marriages/deaths): 1733-1895 (parish A)
- Lutheran church records (births/marriages/deaths): 1785-1896 (parish B)
- Reformated church records (births/marriages/deaths): 1784-1895 (parish B)

== See also ==
- List of municipalities and towns in Slovakia
