= Michal nad Žitavou =

Village and municipality in Slovakia

Michal nad Žitavou Szentmihályúr
- Municipality
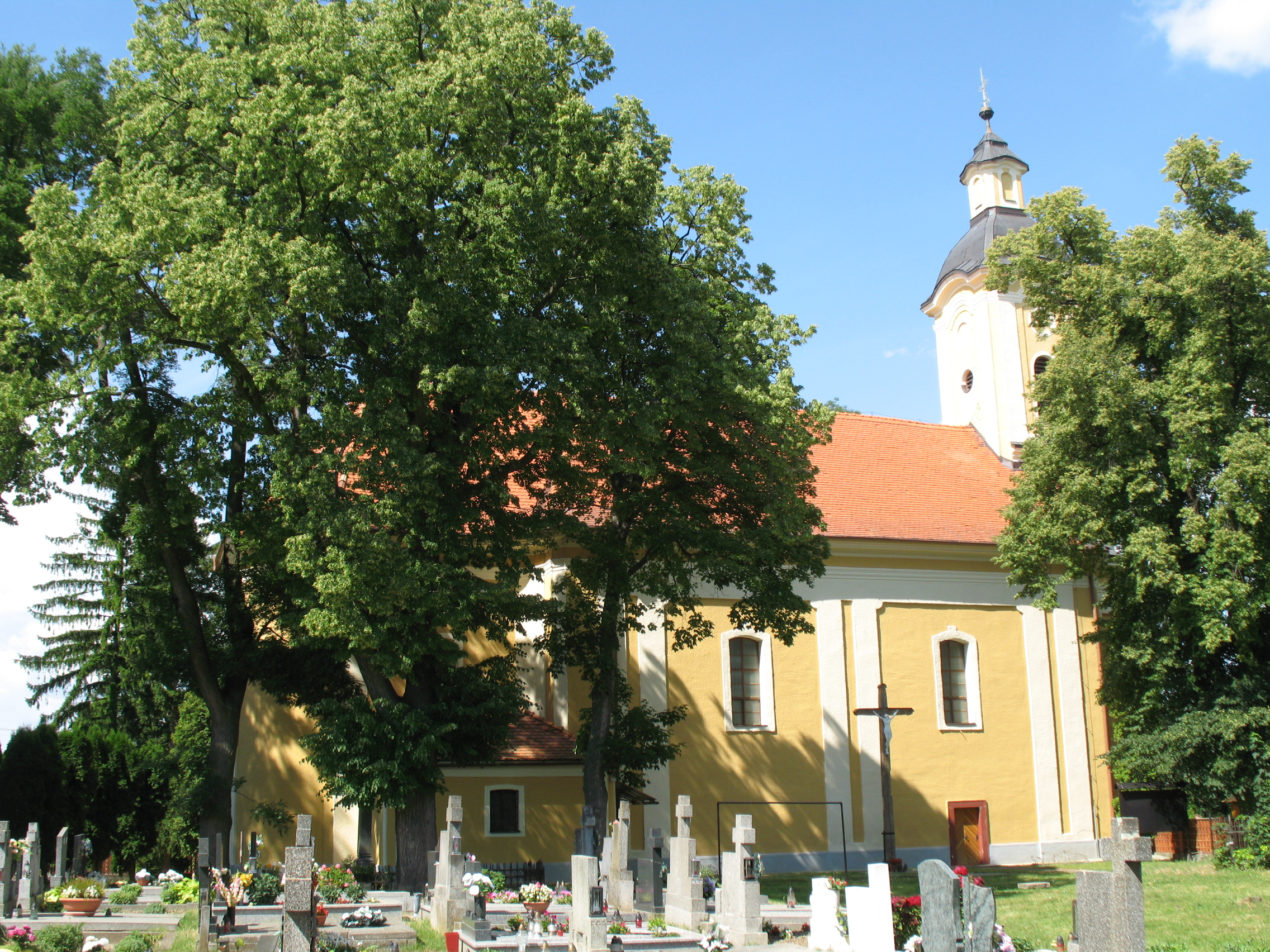

- Flag

- Location of Michal nad Žitavou in the Nitra Region Location of Michal nad Žitavou in Slovakia
- Coordinates: 48.19°N 18.28°E
- Country: Slovakia
- Region: Nitra Region
- District: Nové Zámky District
- First mentioned: 1332

Government
  - Mayor: Peter Drahoš (KDH)

Area
  - Total: 8.18 km^{2} (3.16 sq mi)
- Elevation: 135 m (443 ft)

Population (2025)
  - Total: 684
- Time zone: UTC+1 (CET)
  - Summer (DST): UTC+2 (CEST)
- Postal code: 941 61
- Area code: +421 35
- Vehicle registration plate (until 2022): NZ
- Website: www.michalnadzitavou.sk

Michal nad Žitavou (Hungarian: Szentmihályúr) is a village and municipality in the Nové Zámky District in the Nitra Region of south-west Slovakia.

== History ==
In historical records the village was first mentioned in 1332.

== Geography ==
The municipality lies at an altitude of 135 metres (443 ft) and covers an area of 8.18 km^{2} (3.16 sq mi) (2025).

== Population ==
Population statistic (10 years)
Year	1995	2005	2015	2025
Count	681	683	658	684
Difference		+0.29%	−3.66%	+3.95%

Population statistic
Year	2024	2025
Count	683	684
Difference		+0.14%

It has a population of 684 people (31 December 2025).

=== Ethnicity ===
Census 2021 (1+%)
Ethnicity	Number	Fraction
Slovak	655	97.47%
Not found out	8	1.19%
Czech	7	1.04%
Total	672	

In year 2021 was 672 people by ethnicity 655 as Slovak, 8 as Not found out, 7 as Czech, 5 as Hungarian, 1 as Polish and 1 as Other.

Note on population: The difference values of population numbers in the table "Population statistic" and in the sections "Ethnicity" & "Religion" is caused by the use of various statistical methods.

=== Religion ===
Census 2021 (1+%)
Religion	Number	Fraction
Roman Catholic Church	537	79.91%
None	113	16.82%
Not found out	11	1.64%
Total	672	

In year 2021 was 672 people by religion 537 from Roman Catholic Church, 113 from None, 11 from Not found out, 2 from Greek Catholic Church, 2 from Evangelical Church, 2 from Buddhism, 1 from Calvinist Church, 1 from Other, 1 from Czechoslovak Hussite Church, 1 from Apostolic Church and 1 from Ad hoc movements.

== Facilities ==
The village has a public library, a gym and football pitch.
