= Kolta, Slovakia =

Kolta
- Municipality
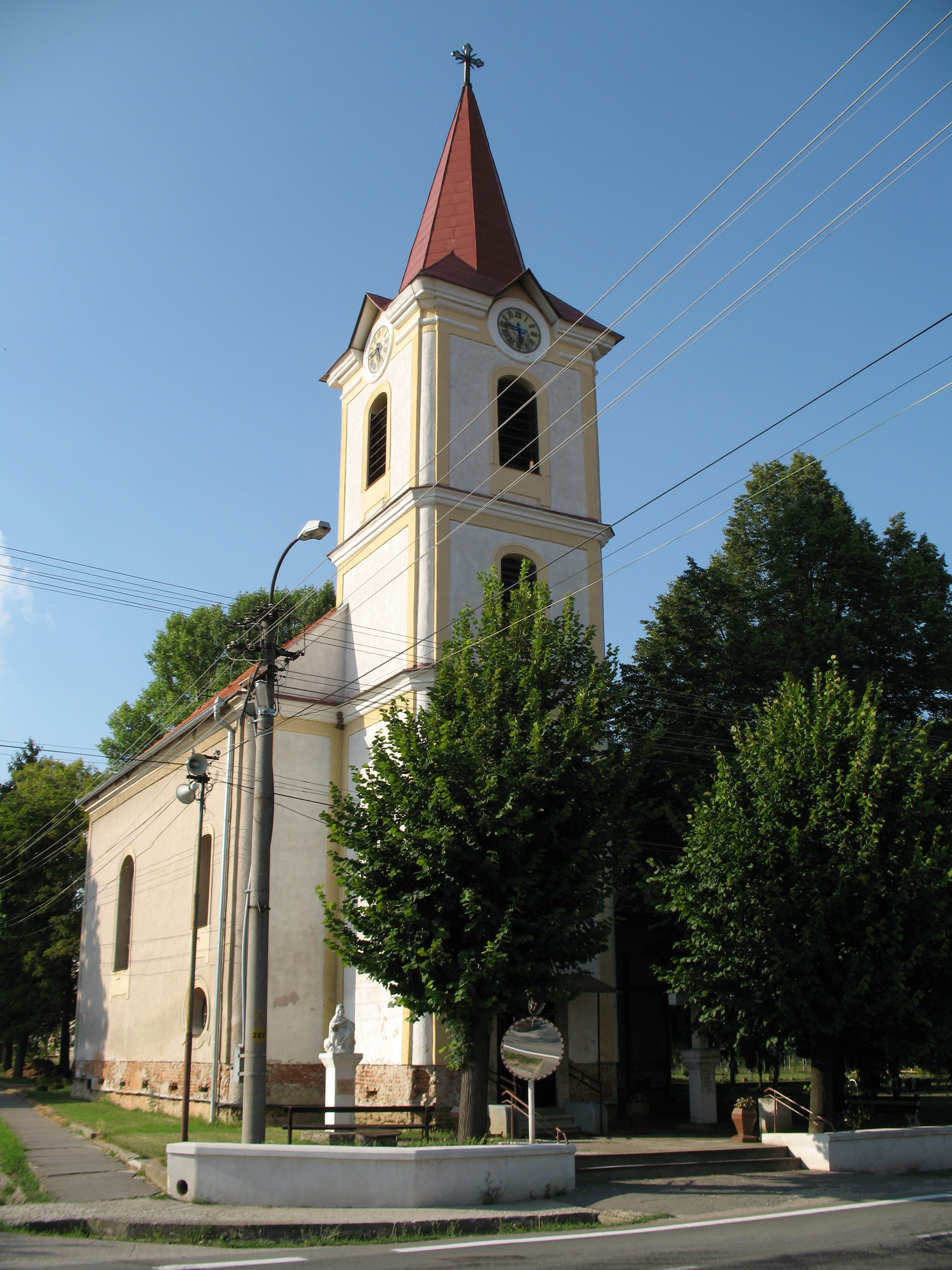

- Flag Coat of arms

- Location of Kolta in the Nitra Region Location of Kolta in Slovakia
- Coordinates: 48.02°N 18.42°E
- Country: Slovakia
- Region: Nitra Region
- District: Nové Zámky District
- First mentioned: 1337

Area
  - Total: 25.83 km^{2} (9.97 sq mi)
- Elevation: 174 m (571 ft)

Population (2025)
  - Total: 1,232
- Time zone: UTC+1 (CET)
  - Summer (DST): UTC+2 (CEST)
- Postal code: 941 33
- Area code: +421 35
- Vehicle registration plate (until 2022): NZ
- Website: www.kolta.sk

Kolta is a village and municipality in the Nové Zámky District in the Nitra Region of southwest Slovakia.

== History ==
The village was first mentioned in historical records in 1337.

== Geography ==
The municipality lies at an altitude of 174 metres (571 ft) and covers an area of 25.83 km^{2} (9.97 sq mi) (2025).

== Population ==
Population statistic (10 years)
Year	1995	2005	2015	2025
Count	1473	1450	1305	1232
Difference		−1.56%	−10%	−5.59%

Population statistic
Year	2024	2025
Count	1237	1232
Difference		−0.40%

It has a population of 1232 people (31 December 2025).

=== Ethnicity ===
Census 2021 (1+ %)
Ethnicity	Number	Fraction
Slovak	1167	92.84%
Not found out	70	5.56%
Hungarian	23	1.82%
Total	1257	

In year 2021 was 1257 people by ethnicity 1167 as Slovak, 70 as Not found out, 23 as Hungarian, 10 as Czech, 5 as Russian, 2 as Jewish, 1 as Romani and 1 as Polish.

Note on population: The difference values of population numbers in the table "Population statistic" and in the sections "Ethnicity" & "Religion" is caused by the use of various statistical methods.

=== Religion ===
Census 2021 (1+ %)
Religion	Number	Fraction
Roman Catholic Church	923	73.43%
None	224	17.82%
Not found out	68	5.41%
Total	1257	

In year 2021 was 1257 people by religion 923 from Roman Catholic Church, 224 from None, 68 from Not found out, 12 from Christian Congregations in Slovakia, 9 from Greek Catholic Church, 8 from Evangelical Church, 3 from Calvinist Church, 3 from Other and not ascertained christian church, 2 from Ad hoc movements, 1 from Eastern Orthodox Church, 1 from Paganism and natural spirituality, 1 from Jehovah's Witnesses, 1 from Other and 1 from Apostolic Church.

== Facilities ==
The village has a public library and a football pitch.

== Genealogical resources ==
The records for genealogical research are available at the state archive "Statny Archiv in Nitra, Slovakia"

- Roman Catholic church records (births/marriages/deaths): 1725-1787 (parish B)
- Lutheran church records (births/marriages/deaths): 1785-1896 (parish B)
- Reformated church records (births/marriages/deaths): 1815-1945 (parish B)

== See also ==
- List of municipalities and towns in Slovakia
