= Čechy, Nové Zámky District =

Village and municipality in Slovakia

Čechy Komáromcsehi
- Municipality
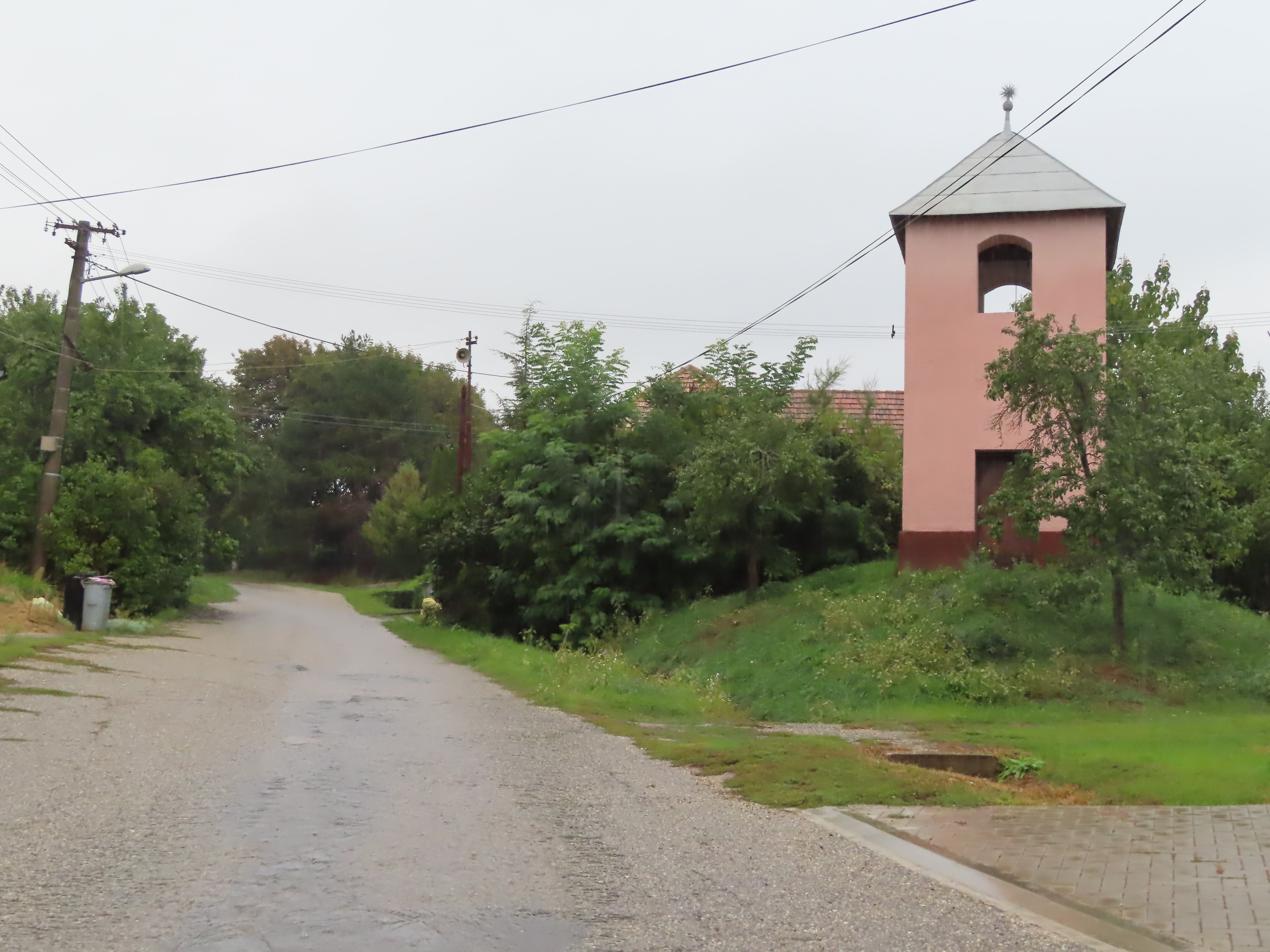

- Flag

- Location of Čechy in the Nitra Region Location of Čechy in Slovakia
- Coordinates: 48.03°N 18.38°E
- Country: Slovakia
- Region: Nitra Region
- District: Nové Zámky District
- First mentioned: 1419

Area
  - Total: 11.84 km^{2} (4.57 sq mi)
- Elevation: 151 m (495 ft)

Population (2025)
  - Total: 268
- Time zone: UTC+1 (CET)
  - Summer (DST): UTC+2 (CEST)
- Postal code: 941 32
- Area code: +421 35
- Vehicle registration plate (until 2022): NZ
- Website: www.obeccechy.sk

Čechy (lit. 'Czech'; Hungarian: Komáromcsehi) is a village and municipality in the Nové Zámky District in the Nitra Region of south-west Slovakia.

== History ==
In historical records the village was first mentioned in 1419 as Felsewchey, then in 1497 as Superior Chey. Later, it was referred to as Csehi, when in the end of the 19th century it was changed to Komáromcsehi. As part of Czechoslovakia, the name became Čechy.

== Geography ==
The municipality lies at an altitude of 151 metres (495 ft) and covers an area of 11.84 km^{2} (4.57 sq mi) (2025).

== Population ==
Population statistic (10 years)
Year	1995	2005	2015	2025
Count	322	325	307	268
Difference		+0.93%	−5.53%	−12.70%

Population statistic
Year	2024	2025
Count	271	268
Difference		−1.10%

It has a population of 268 people (31 December 2025).

=== Ethnicity ===
Census 2021 (1+ %)
Ethnicity	Number	Fraction
Slovak	287	95.34%
Hungarian	9	2.99%
Czech	4	1.32%
Not found out	4	1.32%
Total	301	

In year 2021 was 301 people by ethnicity 287 as Slovak, 9 as Hungarian, 4 as Czech, 4 as Not found out, 2 as Italian, 1 as Serbian and 1 as Russian.

Note on population: The difference values of population numbers in the table "Population statistic" and in the sections "Ethnicity" & "Religion" is caused by the use of various statistical methods.

=== Religion ===
Census 2021 (1+ %)
Religion	Number	Fraction
None	139	46.18%
Roman Catholic Church	133	44.19%
Calvinist Church	10	3.32%
Jehovah's Witnesses	7	2.33%
Not found out	6	1.99%
Other	3	1%
Total	301	

In year 2021 was 301 people by religion 139 from None, 133 from Roman Catholic Church, 10 from Calvinist Church, 7 from Jehovah's Witnesses, 6 from Not found out, 3 from Other, 1 from Evangelical Church, 1 from Seventh-day Adventist Church and 1 from Buddhism.

== Facilities ==
The village has a small public library and football pitch.

== People ==
- Andor Jaross

== Genealogical resources ==
The records for genealogical research are available at the state archive "Statny Archiv in Nitra, Slovakia"

- Roman Catholic church records (births/marriages/deaths): 1725-1895 (parish B)
- Lutheran church records (births/marriages/deaths): 1785-1896 (parish B)
- Reformated church records (births/marriages/deaths): 1815-1945 (parish B)

== See also ==
- List of municipalities and towns in Slovakia
