= Bruty =

Bruty Bart
- Municipality
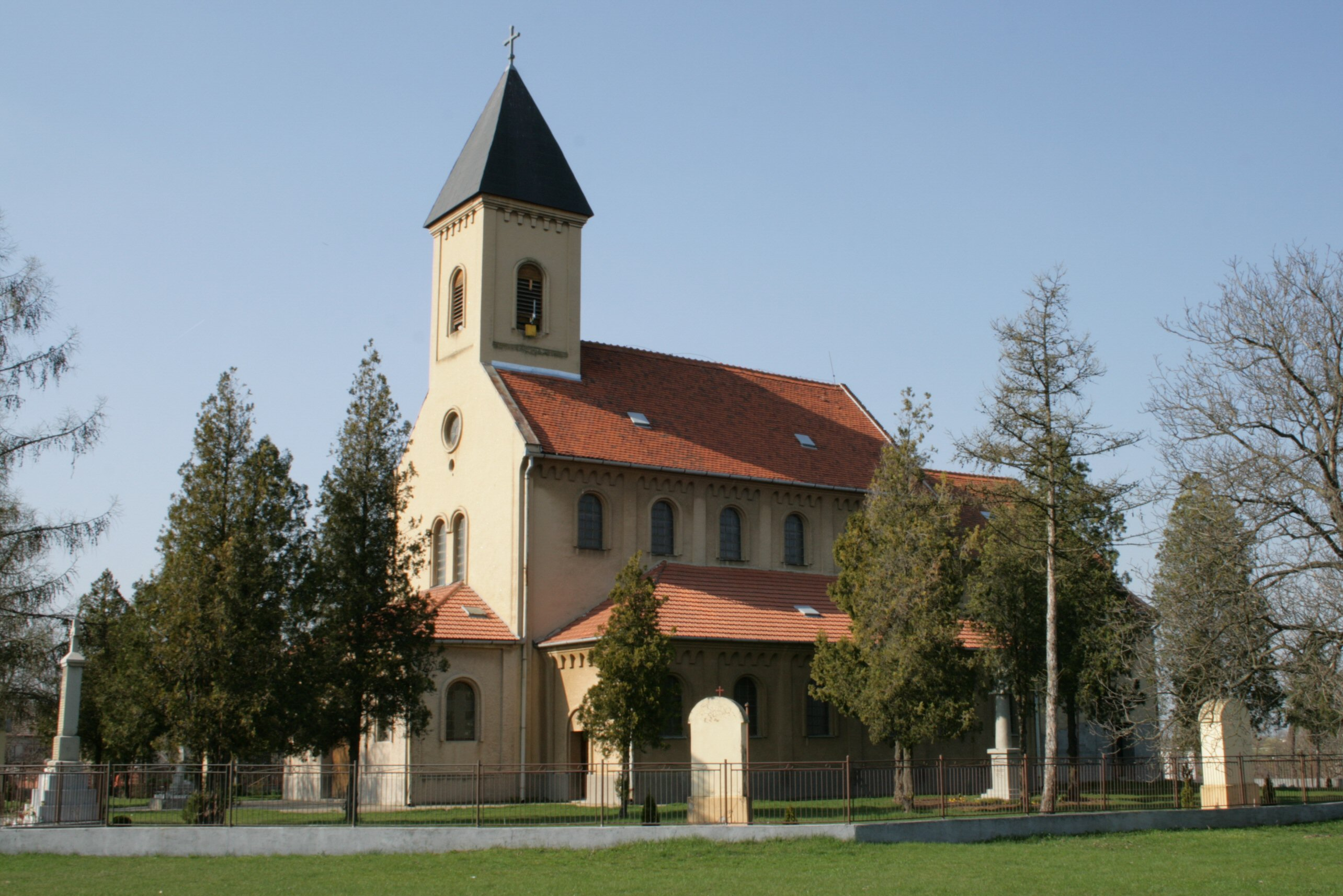

- Flag

- Location of Bruty in the Nitra Region Location of Bruty in Slovakia
- Coordinates: 47.92°N 18.58°E
- Country: Slovakia
- Region: Nitra Region
- District: Nové Zámky District
- First mentioned: 1223

Area
  - Total: 20.53 km^{2} (7.93 sq mi)
- Elevation: 155 m (509 ft)

Population (2025)
  - Total: 598
- Time zone: UTC+1 (CET)
  - Summer (DST): UTC+2 (CEST)
- Postal code: 943 55
- Area code: +421 36
- Vehicle registration plate (until 2022): NZ
- Website: www.bruty.sk

Bruty (Hungarian: Bart) is a municipality and village in the Nové Zámky District in the Nitra Region of south-west Slovakia.

== Etymology ==
Slovak/Slavic brť from Proto-Slavic bъrtь - a hive of forest bees. Buruth 1223, Borth 1342, Barth 1773.

== History ==
In historical records the village was first mentioned in 1223.

== Geography ==
The municipality lies at an altitude of 155 metres (509 ft) and covers an area of 20.53 km^{2} (7.93 sq mi) (2025).

== Population ==
Population statistic (10 years)
Year	1995	2005	2015	2025
Count	732	667	607	598
Difference		−8.87%	−8.99%	−1.48%

Population statistic
Year	2024	2025
Count	605	598
Difference		−1.15%

It has a population of 598 people (31 December 2025).

=== Ethnicity ===
Census 2021 (1+ %)
Ethnicity	Number	Fraction
Hungarian	455	78.71%
Slovak	84	14.53%
Not found out	61	10.55%
Total	578	

In year 2021 was 578 people by ethnicity 455 as Hungarian, 84 as Slovak, 61 as Not found out, 4 as Romani and 1 as Czech.

Note on population: The difference values of population numbers in the table "Population statistic" and in the sections "Ethnicity" & "Religion" is caused by the use of various statistical methods.

=== Religion ===
Census 2021 (1+ %)
Religion	Number	Fraction
Roman Catholic Church	432	74.74%
None	71	12.28%
Not found out	51	8.82%
Calvinist Church	7	1.21%
Total	578	

In year 2021 was 578 people by religion 432 from Roman Catholic Church, 71 from None, 51 from Not found out, 7 from Calvinist Church, 5 from Greek Catholic Church, 3 from Other and not ascertained christian church, 3 from Apostolic Church, 2 from Other, 2 from Evangelical Church, 1 from Buddhism and 1 from Baptists Church.

== Facilities ==
The village has a public library and football pitch.

== Genealogical resources ==
The records for genealogical research are available at the state archive "Statny Archiv in Nitra, Slovakia"

- Roman Catholic church records (births/marriages/deaths): 1784-1832 (parish A)

== See also ==
- List of municipalities and towns in Slovakia
