= Malá nad Hronom =

Malá nad Hronom Kicsind
- Municipality
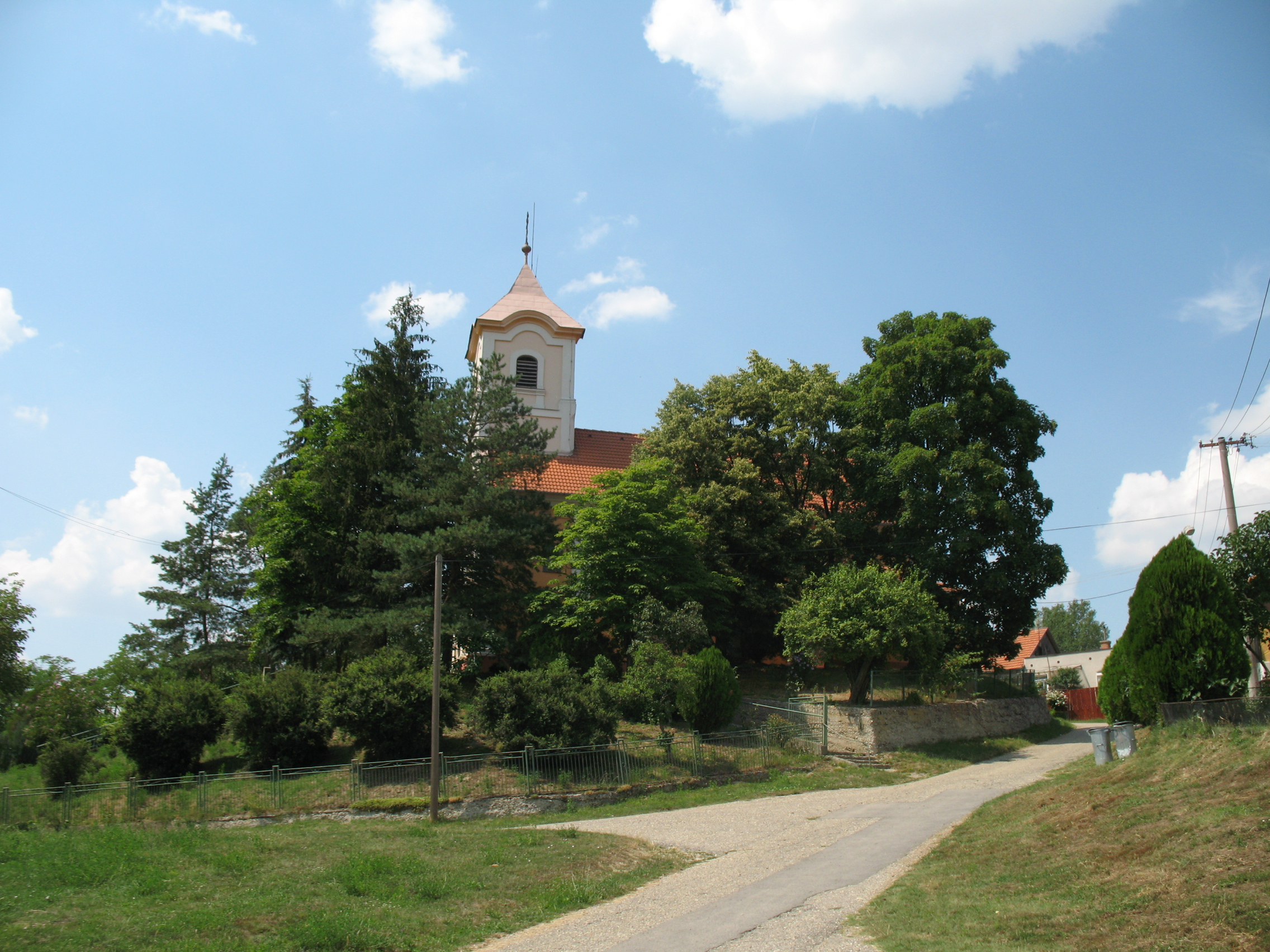

- Location of Malá nad Hronom in the Nitra Region Location of Malá nad Hronom in Slovakia
- Coordinates: 47.85°N 18.68°E
- Country: Slovakia
- Region: Nitra Region
- District: Nové Zámky District
- First mentioned: 1523

Area
  - Total: 7.72 km^{2} (2.98 sq mi)
- Elevation: 116 m (381 ft)

Population (2025)
  - Total: 377
- Time zone: UTC+1 (CET)
  - Summer (DST): UTC+2 (CEST)
- Postal code: 943 65
- Area code: +421 36
- Vehicle registration plate (until 2022): NZ
- Website: www.malanadhronom.sk

Malá nad Hronom (Slovak pronunciation: [ˈmalaː nad ˈɦrɔnɔm], Hungarian: Kicsind) is a village and municipality in the Nové Zámky District in the Nitra Region of southwest Slovakia.

== History ==
In historical records the village was first mentioned in 1523.

== Geography ==
The municipality lies at an altitude of 116 metres (381 ft) and covers an area of 7.72 km^{2} (2.98 sq mi) (2025).

== Population ==
Population statistic (10 years)
Year	1995	2005	2015	2025
Count	423	396	382	377
Difference		−6.38%	−3.53%	−1.30%

Population statistic
Year	2024	2025
Count	381	377
Difference		−1.04%

It has a population of 377 people (31 December 2025).

=== Ethnicity ===
Census 2021 (1+ %)
Ethnicity	Number	Fraction
Hungarian	327	82.16%
Slovak	67	16.83%
Not found out	36	9.04%
Total	398	

In year 2021 was 398 people by ethnicity 327 as Hungarian, 67 as Slovak, 36 as Not found out, 1 as Czech, 1 as Romani and 1 as Other.

Note on population: The difference values of population numbers in the table "Population statistic" and in the sections "Ethnicity" & "Religion" is caused by the use of various statistical methods.

=== Religion ===
Census 2021 (1+ %)
Religion	Number	Fraction
Roman Catholic Church	303	76.13%
None	61	15.33%
Not found out	16	4.02%
Christian Congregations in Slovakia	11	2.76%
Calvinist Church	4	1.01%
Total	398	

In year 2021 was 398 people by religion 303 from Roman Catholic Church, 61 from None, 16 from Not found out, 11 from Christian Congregations in Slovakia, 4 from Calvinist Church, 2 from Other and not ascertained christian church and 1 from Evangelical Church.

== Facilities ==
The village has a public library, gas distribution network and a football pitch.
