= Veľké Lovce =

Veľké Lovce Veľké Lovce
- Municipality
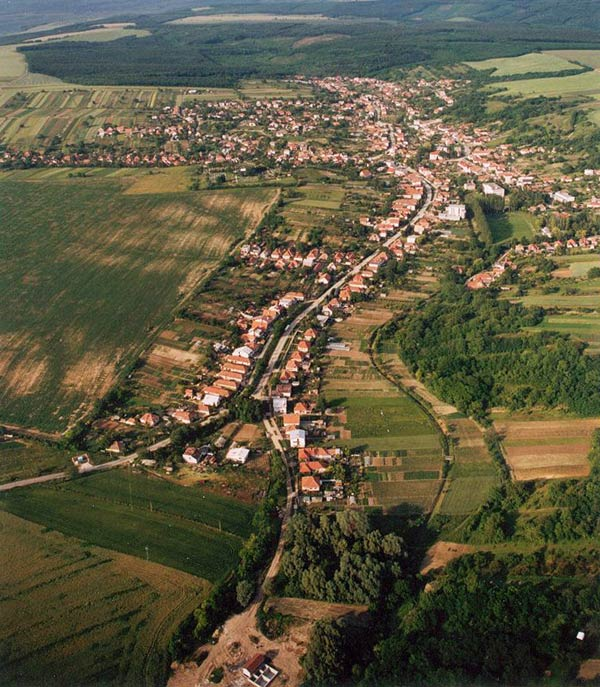

- Flag Coat of arms

- Location of Veľké Lovce in the Nitra Region Location of Veľké Lovce in Slovakia
- Coordinates: 48.06°N 18.34°E
- Country: Slovakia
- Region: Nitra Region
- District: Nové Zámky District
- First mentioned: 1247

Government
  - Mayor: Ing. Libor Kráľ

Area
  - Total: 25.84 km^{2} (9.98 sq mi)
- Elevation: 162 m (531 ft)

Population (2025)
  - Total: 1,723
- Time zone: UTC+1 (CET)
  - Summer (DST): UTC+2 (CEST)
- Postal code: 941 42
- Area code: +421 35
- Vehicle registration plate (until 2022): NZ
- Website: www.velkelovce.sk

Veľké Lovce (Hungarian: Újlót) is a town and municipality in the Nové Zámky District in the Nitra Region of south-west Slovakia. Veľké Lovce is home to 2,079 people according to the 2004 census.

== History ==
In historical records the first mention of the town is from 1236, Though the exact date the town was formed is unknown.

The territory of the town is enriched by an old monastery (Mariačalád) built in 1512 which served during most of the later medieval age and was in the patronage of monks of the Paulin order. The monastery consisted of two towers built over the church and the monks housing. Its library is also worth mentioning, for the fact that it held over 1100 books, but in 1784 they were transferred to Budin (present day Budapest). The monastery along with the order were canceled by Joseph II. The monastery was passed on to the town's owner.

Until 1899 the town had two separate parts Velký Lót and Malý Lót. But due to a catastrophic fire the whole town was destroyed, it then changed the name and was known under the new name Lót. From 1938–1945 the town was a part of Hungary due to border changes in World War II. After the war the name changed to the final Veľké Lovce.

== Geography ==
Climate data for Veľké Lovce
Month	Jan	Feb	Mar	Apr	May	Jun	Jul	Aug	Sep	Oct	Nov	Dec	Year
Mean daily maximum °C (°F)	2 (36)	5 (41)	11 (52)	16 (61)	22 (72)	24 (75)	27 (81)	27 (81)	22 (72)	15 (59)	8 (46)	4 (39)	15 (59)
Mean daily minimum °C (°F)	−3 (27)	−2 (28)	1 (34)	5 (41)	10 (50)	13 (55)	15 (59)	14 (57)	11 (52)	6 (43)	1 (34)	−1 (30)	6 (43)
Average precipitation mm (inches)	42 (1.7)	37 (1.5)	36 (1.4)	38 (1.5)	54 (2.1)	61 (2.4)	52 (2.0)	52 (2.0)	50 (2.0)	37 (1.5)	50 (2.0)	48 (1.9)	557 (21.9)
Mean monthly sunshine hours	70	108	152	221	274	283	271	263	182	134	70	54	2,082
Source: World Weather

The municipality lies at an altitude of 162 metres (531 ft) and covers an area of 25.84 km^{2} (9.98 sq mi) (2025).

The municipality of Veľké Lovce is situated in the Nové Zámky district, Nitriansky region at an altitude of 189 metres and it covers an area of 25.84 km². It lies on the bed of the Pohronská Pahorkatina, in a valley surrounded by forest from the northern and eastern side of the town. The township belongs to the micro region named Termál, and it is situated only 5 km(3 mi)from the well known thermal water resort of Podhájska. There are many foreigners searching for this water resort every year.

The town lies in the temperate zone and has a continental climate. Annual average temperature reaches around 10 °C (50.0 °F), with the warmest month being July with an average of 20 °C and the coldest January with -2 °C. Average annual precipitation is 556 mm.

== Population ==
Population statistic (10 years)
Year	1995	2005	2015	2025
Count	2090	2086	1902	1723
Difference		−0.19%	−8.82%	−9.41%

Population statistic
Year	2024	2025
Count	1746	1723
Difference		−1.31%

It has a population of 1723 people (31 December 2025).

=== Ethnicity ===
Census 2021 (1+ %)
Ethnicity	Number	Fraction
Slovak	1445	80.14%
Not found out	205	11.36%
Hungarian	148	8.2%
Romani	37	2.05%
Total	1803	

In year 2021 was 1803 people by ethnicity 1445 as Slovak, 205 as Not found out, 148 as Hungarian, 37 as Romani, 5 as Czech, 5 as Other, 2 as Russian and 1 as Greek.

Note on population: The difference values of population numbers in the table "Population statistic" and in the sections "Ethnicity" & "Religion" is caused by the use of various statistical methods.

=== Religion ===
Census 2021 (1+ %)
Religion	Number	Fraction
Roman Catholic Church	1246	69.11%
Not found out	208	11.54%
None	191	10.59%
Calvinist Church	128	7.1%
Total	1803	

In year 2021 was 1803 people by religion 1246 from Roman Catholic Church, 208 from Not found out, 191 from None, 128 from Calvinist Church, 10 from Evangelical Church, 6 from Other, 5 from Christian Congregations in Slovakia, 3 from Eastern Orthodox Church, 2 from Paganism and natural spirituality, 2 from Greek Catholic Church and 2 from Ad hoc movements.

== Facilities ==
The town has a public library and a football pitch serving the needs of the football club TJ Velke Lovce. In 1996 a museum was erected inside the Cultural house. There are two churches in the town, the Reformed Christian church built in 1882 and the Roman Catholic church built 1904–1906. There's also a memorial for the men who gave their lives in the first and second world wars, it is in the local cemetery. In 2006, a social house for the elderly was opened. Recently, plans for a multi-purpose building housing town hall offices and a local doctor, new post office, and pharmacy have been discussed.

== Events ==
Every summer the town participates in organizing concerts and provides support in many forms. Upon the few of the bands and artists that have held a concert in Velke Lovce are Desmod, Gladiátor, Verona and the hip hop band L.U.Z.A.
