= Nánabeszter (genus) =

Genus (gens) Nánabeszter
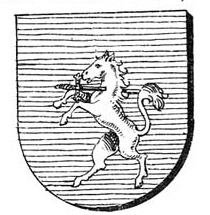
- Country: Kingdom of Hungary
- Founded: c. 1184 (?)
- Founder: Nana I (first known)
- Final ruler: Thomas
- Estates: Nána, Berki, Sóskút, Sasad, Érd, Diósd, Tárnok, Ében, Keszi, Varsány, Teremecs, Nándor
- Dissolution: c. 1323
- Cadet branches: House of Berki; House of Haranglábi (?)

Nánabeszter or Nána-Beszter (Nanabezter) was the name of a minor gens (Latin for "clan"; nemzetség in Hungarian) in the Kingdom of Hungary, which mostly possessed lands along the river Danube in Central Hungary, around the capitals Esztergom and Buda. After their only known branch, which existed until the early 14th century, the clan was also known as Berki family.

== Social status ==
19th-century historian János Karácsonyi considered the clan rose from the social status of castle warriors to the Hungarian nobility, while his contemporary, Mór Wertner identified them of noble origin. György Györffy excluded them from the list of kindreds of castle warrior origin too. Although they were referred to as "iobaiones" ("serfs") in 1228, when the kindred first appeared in historical documents, historian Attila Zsoldos argued there is no indication that any member of the clan was in the service in the system of castle districts in Hungary. It is possible that a certain Nana (I), who served as ispán of the udvornici in Esztergomváralja (a settlement at the foot of Esztergom Castle) in 1184, belonged to this kindred. In his later monograph, Zsoldos considered the early members of the Nánabeszter clan were initially royal servants, who were subordinate only to the king and rose to the nobility due to their loyalty and faithful service.

== History and landholdings ==
The Nánabeszter kindred was first mentioned in contemporary records in 1228, when several members of the clan – Nana (II), Beszter, Csom, Koka, Joanz, Latizko and Radbod – separated their estate in Nána from the landholdings of the cathedral chapter of Esztergom. Based on the kindred's name, Nána, which situated in north of the Danube in Esztergom County (present-day in Slovakia) is considered the ancient estate of the kinship. By the time of the separation in 1228, they also possessed domains in the village of Berki in Pest County, which laid in the territory of present-day Érd.

The degree of kinship relations between the aforementioned members is unknown. Among them, only Nana (II) appeared in subsequent contemporary documents. He participated in the military campaign against the Principality of Halych in 1231, where he was present at the successful siege of Jarosław. As a result, he was granted a portion of the village Sóskút in the neighborhood of Berki by King Andrew II of Hungary in 1233. Nana was styled as "procurator and provisor of the royal horses" in that year. His wife was Agnes, who later joined the Dominican nuns at Rabbits' Island around 1258. Their son, Nana (III) owned a landholding in Sasad in 1256, which laid at the foot of the hill Sashegy (today a borough of Újbuda, the 11th district of Budapest), when he sold one of his servants, who lived there, to his relatives, Michael and Stephen, the sons of Csom. Following his mother, the childless Nana also entered the Dominican friars around 1266. They jointly donated the estate Sóskút to the Dominican nuns at Rabbits' Island in that year.

Nana's relative (cousin?), Demetrius, son of Beszter – who also owned a portion in Sóskút – filed a lawsuit against the donation already in 1266, because, being the closest living relative, he should have inherited the estate after the death of the childless Nana. In his royal charter, King Béla IV ensured the rights of the Dominican nuns, but he prescribed an agreement between the two parties. Demetrius and the nunnery concluded an arrangement in 1270. Accordingly, Demetrius could retain the estate until his death as a usufructuary, but if he dies without a legitimate heir, the portion would automatically fall into the possession of the Dominican nuns. In addition to his landholding in Sóskút, Demetrius also owned portions in the ancient estates Nána and Berki, and, furthermore, a land called Teremecs in Nyitra County (present-day Chrenová, a borough of Nitra in Slovakia) as a royal endowment. Demetrius compiled his last will and testament sometime between 1270 and 1277. As he had no male heirs, he bequeathed his inherited domains and a vineyard to his brother Mérk (Merkh) and his sons. He secured other vineyard as a morning gift to his unidentified wife, while the land Teremecs was inherited by his brother-in-law Andrew Hont-Pázmány, the husband of Maria. He left the aforementioned portion in Sóskút to the Dominican nuns in accordance with their agreement. He also divided his servants and armours. Demetrius died by 1277, when King Ladislaus IV inducted the nuns to their new ownership in Sóskút. Mérk and his sons died sometime thereafter. Subsequently, the late Demetrius' landholdings were passed down another line of the kindred, the descendants of Csom.

Michael, son of Csom served as ispán of Veszprém County between 1243 and 1244. He was also patron of the abbey of Kapornak in Zala County in 1243. Michael, along with his brother Stephen, was a resident of Berki (as it appeared in the above-mentioned land contract with Nana III in 1256), therefore he and his descendants were also referred to as with the surname Berki ("of Berki") in contemporary documents. Michael bought a portion of Érd with half of the island and six servants belonging to it from John, son of Thaddeus Érdi before the collegiate chapter of Buda in 1243. His new lands laid in the neighborhood of the possessions of the provostry of Ócsa and the land of the royal armor-bearers to the north, which separated the other estates of the clan (Berki, Sóskút, Sasad and later Tárnok). Benedict, the provost of Székesfehérvár confirmed the contract of sale in 1244, when Michael Nánabeszter, John Érdi and Benedict, the provost of Ócsa determined the joint borders of their landholdings in Érd. Michael and Stephen endeavored to form their estates into single coherent areas in Central Hungary, southwest of the capital Buda. In the 1260s, they were involved in a series of lawsuits with the queen's servants over a land Deszka near Tárnok Valley. Michael died after 1268.

Stephen and his nephew, Thomas (Michael's son) possessed portions in Keszi too by 1270, where they were also involved in lawsuit with local nobles. Between 1270 and 1272, they proved their right to their estate in Érd, when King Stephen V donated the whole Érd island to his faithful royal armors. Stephen and Thomas complained in 1274, that their village Varsány was destroyed. They got remedy for the destruction of their village if they take the oath to make a complaint about the authenticity of it before the collegiate chapter in Székesfehérvár. After the death of Stephen around 1275, Thomas became head of the Berki family. In 1278, Thomas and his brother Lawrence (future Provost of Požega) managed to obtain further territories in Érd, namely the land of royal armor-bearers. King Andrew III confirmed and transcribed the donation letter in 1291. By the 1280s, Thomas became a prestigious landlord in the region, one of the letters of Archbishop Lodomer also proved this. Thomas also acquired possessions in the nearby Diósd and Keszi. At the time of his death, he also possessed two domains in Ében (laid in the territory of present-day Törökbálint). Furthermore, Thomas paid fifteen marks to the Dominican nuns of Rabbits' Island for the aforementioned estate in Sóskút. He died without legitimate heirs and he was the last member of the Nánabeszter (Berki) kindred. King Charles I endowed the majority of his property – portions in Berki, Sóskút, Érd (two), Tárnok, Ében (two), Keszi and Sasad – to his influential confidant Thomas Szécsényi in 1323. Stephen Sáfár, the castellan of Visegrád was granted Diósd in the same year, while the estate Nándor became the property of the city Buda in June 1323.

Based on the name – Beszter – of the first known member of the kinship, historians Dezső Csánki and János Karácsonyi considered the Haranglábi noble family, which possessed landholdings in Transylvania (primarily Küküllő County) by the mid-14th century, descended from the Nánabeszter clan.

== Family tree ==
Nana I (fl. 1184?)
Nana II (fl. 1228–33) ∞Agnes Berki	Koka (fl. 1228)	Joanz (fl. 1228)	Beszter (fl. 1228)	Latizko (fl. 1228)	Radbod (fl. 1228)	Csom (fl. 1228)
Nana III (fl. 1256–66)	Demetrius (fl. 1266–c. 77)	Mérk (fl. c. 1270–77)	Maria (fl. c. 1270–77) ∞Andrew Hont-Pázmány	Michael (fl. 1243–68)	Stephen (fl. 1256–74)
sons (fl. c. 1270–77)	Thomas (fl. 1270–1323)	Lawrence (fl. 1278–1308)

== Coat-of-arms ==
The coat-of-arms of the kindred (silver horse with sword pierced neck) is appeared in the 17th-century Siebmachers Wappenbuch. Based on this, the village Nána adopted a coat-of-arms in June 2003, designed by Slovak herold Ladislav Vrteľ.

== Sources ==
- Buzás, Gergely (2013). "Sárkány Ambrus érdi udvarháza [The Manor House of Ambrose Sárkány in Érd]". Archaeologia – Altum Castrum Online (in Hungarian). MNM Visegrádi Mátyás Király Múzeum: 2–16.
- Horváth, Lajos (1993). "Érd 750 éves. Érd az Árpád-korban [Érd is 750 years old. Érd in the Age of the Árpáds]". Földrajzi Múzeumi Tanulmányok (in Hungarian). 12. Hungarian Geographical Museum: 3–9. ISSN 0237-3483.
- Karácsonyi, János (1901). A magyar nemzetségek a XIV. század közepéig. III. kötet [The Hungarian genera until the middle of the 14th century, Vol. 3] (in Hungarian). Hungarian Academy of Sciences.
- Zsoldos, Attila (1993). "Nemzetség és várjobbágyság (Megjegyzések a várjobbágy-nemzetségek számának kérdéséhez) [Noble Kindreds and Castle Warriors (Remarks on the Number of Kindreds of Castle Warrior Origin)]". Turul (in Hungarian). 66 (4). Magyar Heraldikai és Genealógiai Társaság: 15–25. ISSN 1216-7258.
- Zsoldos, Attila (2011). Magyarország világi archontológiája, 1000–1301 [Secular Archontology of Hungary, 1000–1301] (in Hungarian). História, MTA Történettudományi Intézete. ISBN 978-963-9627-38-3.
- Zsoldos, Attila (2020). The Árpáds and Their People. An Introduction to the History of Hungary from cca. 900 to 1301. Arpadiana IV., Research Centre for the Humanities. ISBN 978-963-416-226-1.
