= Nana Nánabeszter =

Hungarian nobleman

Procurator and Provisor of the Royal Horses
- Reign: 1233
- Died: after 1233
- Noble family: gens Nánabeszter
- Spouse: Agnes Berki
- Issue: Nana III
- Father: Nana I

Nana from the kindred Nánabeszter (Hungarian: Nánabeszter nembeli Nána; died after 1233) was a Hungarian nobleman and soldier in the 13th century.

== Career ==
Nana II was born into the gens (clan) Nánabeszter, which possessed landholdings along the river Danube in Central Hungary, in the surrounding area of royal capitals Esztergom and Buda. His father was Nana I, who is possibly identical with that namesake noble, who served as ispán of the udvornici in Esztergomváralja (a settlement at the foot of Esztergom Castle) in 1184.

Along with several other members of the kindred, Nana II was first mentioned in contemporary records in 1228, when they separated their estate in Nána (present-day in Slovakia) from the landholdings of the cathedral chapter of Esztergom. By the time of the separation in 1228, Nana and his relatives also possessed domains in the village of Berki in Pest County, which laid in the territory of present-day Érd. Among them, only Nana appeared in subsequent contemporary documents. He participated in the military campaign against the Principality of Halych in 1231, where he was present at the successful siege of Jarosław. As a result, he was granted a portion of the village Sóskút in the neighborhood of Berki by King Andrew II of Hungary in 1233 (the village was formerly possessed by Fabian Tétény). Nana was styled as "procurator and provisor of the royal horses" in that year, which was a minor position in the royal court and there is no other known office-holders of the dignity. This is the last information about Nana.

== Personal life ==
Nana married Agnes, daughter of Paul, a local neighboring lord in the village Berki. According to her own confession, Agnes was born in 1226. She joined the Dominican nuns at Rabbits' Island in 1258, after her husband's death in an unspecified time. Their son was Nana III. Following his mother, the childless Nana also entered the Dominican friars around 1266. They jointly donated the estate Sóskút to the Dominican nuns at Rabbits' Island in that year, which triggered protests from the distant relatives within the kindred. Agnes testified as the seventeenth nun during the investigation phase of the canonization process of St. Margaret of Hungary – daughter of King Béla IV – in 1276.

== Sources ==
- Font, Márta (2017). "A halicsi magyar uralmat támogató elit [The Elite Supporting Hungarian Rule in Galicia]". Világtörténet (in Hungarian). 39 (1): 33–52. ISSN 0083-6265.
- Horváth, Lajos (1993). "Érd 750 éves. Érd az Árpád-korban [Érd is 750 years old. Érd in the Age of the Árpáds]". Földrajzi Múzeumi Tanulmányok (in Hungarian). 12. Hungarian Geographical Museum: 3–9. ISSN 0237-3483.
- Karácsonyi, János (1901). A magyar nemzetségek a XIV. század közepéig. III. kötet [The Hungarian genera until the middle of the 14th century, Vol. 3] (in Hungarian). Hungarian Academy of Sciences.
- Zsoldos, Attila (2011). Magyarország világi archontológiája, 1000–1301 [Secular Archontology of Hungary, 1000–1301] (in Hungarian). História, MTA Történettudományi Intézete. ISBN 978-963-9627-38-3.
