= Michael Nánabeszter =

Hungarian nobleman

- Lord of Berki

Ispán of Veszprém
- Reign: 1243–1244
- Predecessor: Reynold Rátót
- Successor: Norbert Rátót
- Died: between 1268 and 1270
- Noble family: gens Nánabeszter
- Issue: Thomas; Lawrence
- Father: Csom

Michael from the kindred Nánabeszter (Hungarian: Nánabeszter nembeli Mihály; died between 1268 and 1270) was a Hungarian nobleman in the 13th century, who served as ispán of Veszprém County from 1243 to 1244. He was also known as Michael Berki (Hungarian: Berki Mihály) after his main residence.

== Family ==
Michael was born into the gens (clan) Nánabeszter, which possessed landholdings along the river Danube in Central Hungary, in the surrounding area of the royal capitals Esztergom and Buda. His father was Csom (or Chom), who was mentioned as a living person in a single document in 1228. Michael had a brother Stephen, with whom he was often involved in estate affairs. Michael had two sons: Thomas inherited his wealth but died without descendants, ending the line of Nánabeszters, while Lawrence entered ecclesiastical career and served as Provost of Požega from around 1288 until his death.

== Career ==
When Michael first appeared in contemporary records in 1243, during the reign of Béla IV of Hungary, he already functioned as ispán of Veszprém County. He held the position at least until the next year, 1244. He was also patron of the abbey of Kapornak in Zala County in 1243. Michael bought a portion of Érd with half of the island and six servants belonging to it from John, son of Thaddeus Érdi before the collegiate chapter of Buda in 1243. His new lands laid in the neighborhood of the possessions of the provostry of Ócsa and the land of the royal armor-bearers to the north, which separated the other estates of the clan (Berki, Sóskút, Sasad and later Tárnok). Benedict, the provost of Székesfehérvár confirmed the contract of sale in 1244, when Michael Nánabeszter, John Érdi and Benedict, the provost of Ócsa determined the joint borders of their landholdings in Érd.

Michael, along with his brother Stephen, was a resident of the village of Berki in Pest County, which laid in the territory of present-day Érd, therefore Michael and his descendants were also referred to as with the surname Berki ("of Berki") in contemporary documents. Their relative, Nana III sold one of his servants, who lived in his estate Sasad (today a borough of Újbuda, Budapest), to Michael and Stephen in 1256.

The brothers endeavored to form their estates into single coherent areas in Central Hungary, southwest of the capital Buda. Throughout the 1260s, they were involved in a series of lawsuits with the queen's servants over a land Deszka near Tárnok Valley. Queen Maria Laskarina entrusted two arbiters, Csák from the clan Csák and her vice-chancellor Lawrence Becsegergely to judge over the long-drawn litigation in November 1268. This is the last information about Michael as a living person. He died shortly thereafter, sometime before 1270, when his brother Stephen and his son Thomas were present together in another lawsuit.

== Sources ==
- Buzás, Gergely (2013). "Sárkány Ambrus érdi udvarháza [The Manor House of Ambrose Sárkány in Érd]". Archaeologia – Altum Castrum Online (in Hungarian). MNM Visegrádi Mátyás Király Múzeum: 2–16.
- Horváth, Lajos (1993). "Érd 750 éves. Érd az Árpád-korban [Érd is 750 years old. Érd in the Age of the Árpáds]". Földrajzi Múzeumi Tanulmányok (in Hungarian). 12. Hungarian Geographical Museum: 3–9. ISSN 0237-3483.
- Karácsonyi, János (1901). A magyar nemzetségek a XIV. század közepéig. III. kötet [The Hungarian genera until the middle of the 14th century, Vol. 3] (in Hungarian). Hungarian Academy of Sciences.
- Zsoldos, Attila (2011). Magyarország világi archontológiája, 1000–1301 [Secular Archontology of Hungary, 1000–1301] (in Hungarian). História, MTA Történettudományi Intézete. ISBN 978-963-9627-38-3.
- Zsoldos, Attila (2020). The Árpáds and Their People. An Introduction to the History of Hungary from cca. 900 to 1301. Arpadiana IV., Research Centre for the Humanities. ISBN 978-963-416-226-1.

Michael Genus Nánabeszter Born: ? Died: 1268/70
Political offices
Preceded by Reynold Rátót	Ispán of Veszprém; 1243–1244	Succeeded by Norbert Rátót
