= Eshun =

Eshun is a Ghanaian surname. Notable people with the surname include:

- Edwin Eshun (born 1999), Ghanaian singer
- Ekow Eshun (born 1968), British writer, journalist, and broadcaster
- Ethel Eshun (born 1994), Ghanaian singer
- John Eshun (born 1942), Ghanaian footballer
- Kodwo Eshun (born 1967), British-Ghanaian writer, theorist and film-maker
- Nana Eshun (born 1969), Ghanaian footballer
- Nana Eshun (footballer born 1982) (born 1982), Ghanaian footballer
- Robert Eshun (born 1974), Ghanaian footballer
- Nate A-Eshun (born 1991), Ghanaian musician
