= Demetrius Nánabeszter =

Hungarian nobleman

- Died: between 1270 and 1277
- Buried: St. John monastery in Buda
- Noble family: gens Nánabeszter
- Father: Beszter

Demetrius from the kindred Nánabeszter (Hungarian: Nánabeszter nembeli Demeter; died between 1270 and 1277) was a Hungarian nobleman in the 13th century.

== Family ==
Demetrius was born into the gens (clan) Nánabeszter, which possessed landholdings along the river Danube in Central Hungary, in the surrounding area of royal capitals Esztergom and Buda. His father was Beszter (or Bezter), who was mentioned as a living person by a single document in 1228. Demetrius had a brother Mérk (or Merkh) and a sister Maria, who married Andrew Hont-Pázmány from his clan's Forgách branch. Demetrius and his unidentified wife had no male descendants.

== Career ==
It is plausible that Demetrius was a skilled soldier, who participated in various campaigns during the reign of Béla IV of Hungary. According to his last will and testament (see below), he possessed four coats of armor in an unknown composition and quality, which he once used in battles. Demetrius possessed landholdings in Sóskút, the kindred's ancient estates Nána and Berki (which laid in the territory of present-day Érd), and, furthermore, a land called Teremecs in Nyitra County (present-day Chrenová, a borough of Nitra in Slovakia) as a royal endowment, which he may have been received after his faithful military service.

His relative (cousin?), the childless Nana III entered the Dominican friars shortly before 1266 and donated his portion in Sóskút to the Dominican nuns at Rabbits' Island in that year. Demetrius – who also owned a portion in Sóskút – filed a lawsuit against the donation in 1266, because, being the closest living relative, he should have inherited the estate after the death of the childless Nana. In his royal charter, King Béla IV ensured the rights of the Dominican nuns, but he prescribed an agreement between the two parties. Demetrius and the nunnery concluded an arrangement in 1270. Accordingly, Demetrius could retain the estate until his death as a usufructuary, but if he dies without a legitimate heir, the portion would automatically fall into the possession of the Dominican nuns. Demetrius ought to try to keep the inherited estates within the clan and endeavor to for their possessions into single coherent areas in Central Hungary, similarly to his contemporaries.

== Last will ==
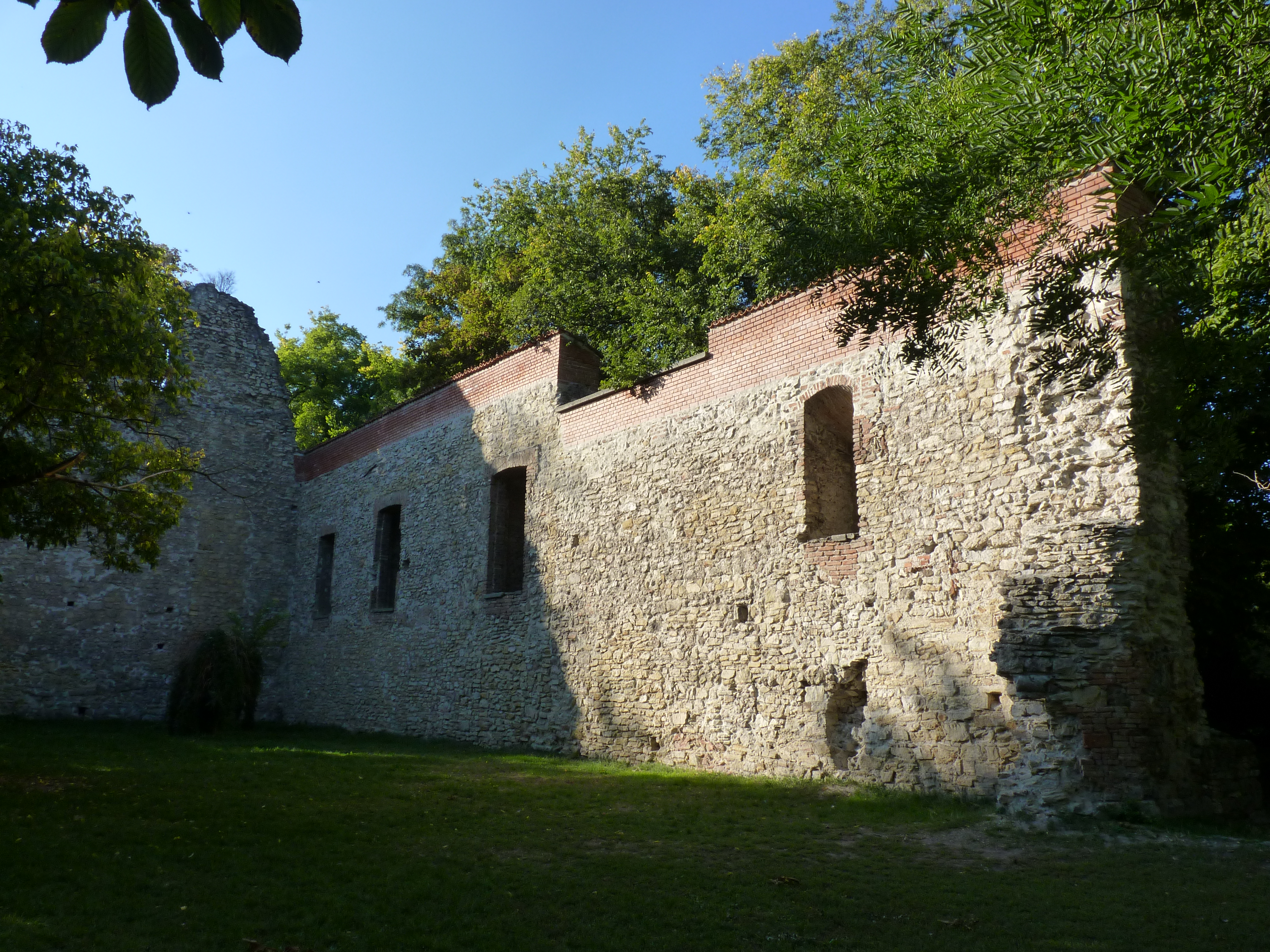
Ruins of the Franciscan monastery church on Margaret Island, whose existence was first mentioned by the last testament of Demetrius Nánabeszter in the 1270s

Demetrius and his unidentified wife compiled their joint last will and testament sometime between 1270 and 1277. The document is one of the rare last wills from the 13th-century Hungary that lists and enumerates in detail the assets, possessions and wealth of the testator, which is a valuable source for the way of life of the contemporary nobility. As Demetrius had no male descendants, he bequeathed his inherited unspecified domains and a vineyard to his brother Mérk and his sons. He secured another vineyard as a morning gift to his unidentified wife, while the land Teremecs was inherited by his brother-in-law Andrew Hont-Pázmány. In accordance with their aforementioned agreement, Demetrius left his portion in Sóskút to the Dominican nuns at Rabbits' Island. Similarly to his domains, Demetrius also divided up his servants, most of them were left to his brother. Andrew Hont-Pázmány was granted two servants, while his wife Maria (Demetrius' sister) received one servant. Demetrius owned four coats of armor at the time of the compilation of the document; according to his will, he had to be buried in one of his armors at the Franciscan monastery of St. John in Buda (which laid in the place where now the Carmelite Monastery, the Prime Minister's residence is located). Demetrius bequeathed the "best one" of the three remaining coats of armor to Mérk and the other two to the Order of Friars Minor. Demetrius also divided his livestock (horses etc.) among his familiares and his wife in order to be distributed as payment to the remaining servants. Demetrius also supported financially the Franciscan monastery of St. Clare on Rabbits' Island, which was under construction around the time of the compilation of the last testament.

His wife divided her assets between Demetrius, her unidentified sister and the Franciscan monastery in Buda she had chosen as her burial place too beside her husband. She possessed various jewels, including a necklace, two pendants and a silver belt embroidered with gold thread. She also mentioned the most valuable items of her wardrobe, for instance a beaded coif, a golden bonnet, a veil decorated with gems and a headscarf embroidered with gold. She also possessed valuable upholstery and carpets. Apart from them, she left all clothing to Demetrius. She owned five servants in her household. She bequeathed three of them to her husband on the condition that they be freed after her death, while the remaining two were automatically freed in the will. The document is one of the few contemporary sources that provides insight into a noblewoman's wealth in Hungary.

Demetrius died by 1277, when King Ladislaus IV inducted the nuns to their new ownership in Sóskút, in accordance with the 1270 arrangement and the subsequent last will and testament. Mérk and his sons died sometime thereafter, ending the line of Beszter. Subsequently, by the 1290s, the late Demetrius' landholdings were passed down a member of another line of the kindred, Thomas, the descendant of Csom.

== Sources ==
- Karácsonyi, János (1901). A magyar nemzetségek a XIV. század közepéig. III. kötet [The Hungarian genera until the middle of the 14th century, Vol. 3] (in Hungarian). Hungarian Academy of Sciences.
- Kertész, Balázs (2017). "A koldulórendek megtelepedése az "ország közepén" [Settlement of Begging Orders in "Medium Regni"]". In Csurgai Horváth, József (ed.). Az első 300 év Magyarországon és Európában. A Domonkos-rend a középkorban (in Hungarian). Alba Civitas Történeti Alapítvány. pp. 9–31. ISBN 978-963-88117-7-6.
- Zsoldos, Attila (2020). The Árpáds and Their People. An Introduction to the History of Hungary from cca. 900 to 1301. Arpadiana IV., Research Centre for the Humanities. ISBN 978-963-416-226-1.
