= Nanako =

- Pronunciation: Na-na-ko
- Gender: Female

Origin
- Origin: Japanese
- Meaning: It can have many different meanings depending on the kanji used.
- Region of origin: Japan

Other names
- Related names: Nana; Nanae; Nanaka; Nanami; Nanase

Nanako (ななこ, ナナコ) is a feminine Japanese given name.

== Written forms ==
Nanako can be written using different kanji characters and can mean:

- 奈々子, "Nara, repeat previous kanji, child"
- 菜々子, "greens, repeat previous kanji, child"
- 奈那子, "apple tree, that, child"

The name can also be written in hiragana or katakana.

== People ==
- Nanako Fujii (藤井 菜々子; born 1999), Japanese racewalker
- Nanako Fujita (藤田 菜七子; born 1997), Japanese retired jockey
- Nanako Inagaki (稲垣 那奈子; born 2000), Japanese professional golfer
- Nanako Matsumoto (松本 奈菜子; born 1996), Japanese sprinter
- Nanako Matsushima (松嶋 菜々子; born 1973), Japanese actress
- Nanako Mori (森 なな子; born 1988), Japanese actress
- Nanako Sasaki (born 1999), Japanese professional footballer
- Nanako Shigesada (重定 南奈子), Japanese Professor Emeritus
- Nanako Takeda (武田 菜々子; born 2000), Japanese professional footballer
- Nanako Takushi (澤岻 奈々子; born 1976), Japanese pop singer
- Nanako Todo (東藤 なな子; born 2000), Japanese basketball player
- Nanako Wakita (脇田 菜々子; born 1997), Japanese shogi player

== Fictional characters ==
=== Given name ===
- Nanako Dojima, a character in the video game Persona 4
- Nanako Hasaba, a character from Jujutsu Kaisen
- Nanako Hasegawa, a character in the manga and live-action series Haruka 17
- Nanako Itagaki, a character in the manga and anime series Fighting Spirit
- Nanako Kanazawa, a character in the manga and anime series Mahoraba
- Nanako Kashii, a character in the manga and anime series Toradora!
- Nanako Kuroi, a teacher character in Lucky Star
- Nanako Meino, a minor recurring character in the anime and manga series 'The Prince of Tennis
- Nanako Misonoo, the main character of the manga and anime series Oniisama e...
- Nanako Mizuki, a character in the manga, anime, and live-action series Great Teacher Onizuka
- Nanako Momoi, a character in the manga Your and My Secret
- Nanako Oohara, a character in the manga and anime series Crayon Shin-chan
- Nanako Shichigusa, the titular character in the anime OVA series, Amazing Nurse Nanako
- Nanako Saeki, a character in the manga and anime series The Flowers of Evil
- Nanako Yukishiro (written 七々子, with the kanji for seven), the main character of the manga and anime series Senryu Girl
- Nanako Okajima, a character from the 1991 Studio Ghibli movie Only Yesterday

=== Surname ===
- Maaya Nanako (魚々戸), a character in the manga and anime series Kenkō Zenrakei Suieibu Umishō

== See also ==
- Amazing Nurse Nanako, an anime OVA series
- nanaco, a prepaid and rechargeable contactless electronic money card
- Nanako SOS, a manga and anime series
