= Thomas Nánabeszter =

Hungarian nobleman and soldier

- Lord of Berki
- Died: around 1323
- Noble family: gens Nánabeszter
- Father: Michael

Thomas from the kindred Nánabeszter (Hungarian: Nánabeszter nembeli Tamás; died around 1323) was a Hungarian nobleman and soldier at the turn of the 13th and 14th centuries, who possessed several domains along the river Danube in Central Hungary, surrounding the capital Buda at that time. Being the last member of the Nánabeszter clan, he was also known as Thomas Berki (Hungarian: Berki Tamás) after his main residence.

== Family ==
Thomas was born into the gens (clan) Nánabeszter, which possessed landholdings along the river Danube in Central Hungary, in the surrounding area of royal capitals Esztergom and Buda. His father was Michael, who served as ispán of Veszprém County between 1243 and 1244. He had a younger brother Lawrence, who entered ecclesiastical career and served as Provost of Požega from around 1288 until his death.

== Career and landholdings ==
Thomas first appeared in contemporary records following the death of his father sometime between 1268 and 1270. He inherited Michael's landholdings in Berki, Érd, Sóskút and Tárnok (Deszka), which lay in Pest and Fejér counties along the right bank of the river Danube. During the first years, until 1274, his name was mentioned alongside his uncle Stephen. They possessed portions of Keszi too by 1270, where they were also involved in lawsuits with local nobles. Between 1270 and 1272, they proved their right to their estate in Érd, when King Stephen V donated the whole Érd island to his faithful royal armors. Stephen and Thomas complained in 1274, that their village Varsány was destroyed. They got a remedy for the destruction of their village if they took the oath to make a complaint about the authenticity of it before the collegiate chapter in Székesfehérvár. After the death of Stephen around 1275, Thomas became head of the Berki family.

In June 1278, Thomas and his brother Lawrence managed to obtain further territories in Érd, namely the then uninhabited land of royal armor-bearers, which they were granted by King Ladislaus IV. By the 1280s, Thomas became a prestigious landlord in the region, who endeavored to form his estates into single coherent areas in Central Hungary, southwest of the capital Buda – continuing the late Michael's political orientation. As the last living secular member of the kindred, he inherited and possessed in one person all the acquisitions of the kindred. His local influence and wealth are well illustrated by a letter from Archbishop Lodomer, who requested him to take Michael, the abbot of Csanád (today Cenad, Romania) under his patronage. Thomas was also styled as comes in the letter, whose year of issue is uncertain (according to historian János Karácsonyi, it was written around 1285).

After 1290, Thomas became a supporter of King Andrew III. He participated in the royal campaign against the Duchy of Austria in the summer of 1291. For his merits, Andrew III confirmed and transcribed the aforementioned donation letter of his predecessor Ladislaus IV in favor of Thomas and Lawrence in September 1291. In accordance with a preceding arrangement between his relative Demetrius (who died before 1277) and the Dominican monastery of Rabbits' Island, Thomas paid fifteen marks to the Dominican nuns for a further portion in Sóskút sometime between 1290 and 1300, thereby increasing the area of his local estate. According to a pay certificate issued in 1292, Thomas accidentally killed Paul Csák during a clash, for which he had to pay a blood fee of sixteen marks to the brothers of the victim, Gurke (who was future royal standard-bearer at the Battle of Rozgony in 1312) and Michael. Thomas obtained his possessions in Diósd by way of litigation, when he was involved in a lawsuit with certain local nobles (called "Diódi") between 1293 and 1294. The lawsuit narrated a maltreatment of one of Thomas' serfs (libertinus) called John, son of Tywan, whose house was attacked by the neighboring nobles and himself was wounded in 1293 (i.e. Thomas already possessed a portion in the settlement by that time). The litigation process ended with an agreement: Thomas withdrew the case in exchange for some portions of Diósd. At the time of his death, he also possessed two domains in Ében (laid in the territory of present-day Törökbálint), but the circumstances of their acquisition are unknown.

== Extinction of the kindred ==
Thomas died without legitimate male heirs sometime around 1323. He was the last member of the Nánabeszter (Berki) kindred. King Charles I endowed the majority of his property – portions in Berki, Sóskút, Érd (two), Tárnok, Ében (two), Keszi and Sasad (which laid at the foot of the hill Sashegy, today a borough of Újbuda, the 11th district of Budapest) – to his influential confidant Thomas Szécsényi in 1323. Despite the fact that the Szécsényis declared their claim to the entire Nánabeszter property, Stephen Sáfár, the castellan of Visegrád was granted Diósd in the same year, while the estate Nándor became the property of the city Buda in June 1323.

== Sources ==
- Buzás, Gergely (2013). "Sárkány Ambrus érdi udvarháza [The Manor House of Ambrose Sárkány in Érd]". Archaeologia – Altum Castrum Online (in Hungarian). MNM Visegrádi Mátyás Király Múzeum: 2–16.
- Horváth, Lajos (1993). "Érd 750 éves. Érd az Árpád-korban [Érd is 750 years old. Érd in the Age of the Árpáds]". Földrajzi Múzeumi Tanulmányok (in Hungarian). 12. Hungarian Geographical Museum: 3–9. ISSN 0237-3483.
- Karácsonyi, János (1901). A magyar nemzetségek a XIV. század közepéig. III. kötet [The Hungarian genera until the middle of the 14th century, Vol. 3] (in Hungarian). Hungarian Academy of Sciences.
- Zsoldos, Attila (2011). Magyarország világi archontológiája, 1000–1301 [Secular Archontology of Hungary, 1000–1301] (in Hungarian). História, MTA Történettudományi Intézete. ISBN 978-963-9627-38-3.
- Zsoldos, Attila (2020). The Árpáds and Their People. An Introduction to the History of Hungary from cca. 900 to 1301. Arpadiana IV., Research Centre for the Humanities. ISBN 978-963-416-226-1.
