= Nana =

Nana, Na Na or NANA may refer to:

== People ==
- Nana (given name), including a list of people and characters with the given name
- Nana (surname), including a list of people and characters with the surname
- Nana (chief) (died 1896), Mimbreño Apache chief
- Nanha (painter) (fl. c. 1582–1635), Indian painter, also called Nana
- Lulu and Nana (born 2018), pseudonyms for twin Chinese girls, who are allegedly the first humans produced from embryos that were genome-edited
- Nana, name used for the Ngaanyatjarra people of Western Australia

== Arts and entertainment ==
=== Films ===
- Nana (1926 film), a French film by Jean Renoir
- Nana (1934 film), an American film by Dorothy Arzner and George Fitzmaurice
- Nana (1944 film), a Mexican film by Celestino Gorostiza and Roberto Gavaldón starring Lupe Velez
- Nana (1955 film), a French-Italian film by Christian-Jaque
- Nana (1970 film), starring Gillian Hills
- Nana, the original title of Nana, the True Key of Pleasure, a 1982 Italian film by Dan Wolman
- Nana (1985 film), a Mexican film by Rafael Baledón starring Irma Serrano and Verónica Castro
- Nana (1997 film), a Palestinian documentary film
- Nanà (2001 film), by Alberto Negrin
- Nana (2005 film), based on the manga by Ai Yazawa
- Nana 2 (2006 film), based on the manga by Ai Yazawa and sequel of the 2005 movie
- Nana (2007 short film), by Warwick Thornton
- La Nana, Spanish name for The Maid (2009 film) by Chilean Sebastián Silva
- Nana: A Tale of Us, a 2017 film by Tiakümzük Aier

=== Music ===
- Nana (echos), a concept in Byzantine music
- NaNa (band), a Japanese duo formed in 1996
- Na Na (Russian band), a Russian band
- Nana (entertainer) (born 1991), a South Korean singer, actress, and model born in 1991
- Nana (entertainer, born 2001), a member of the South Korean girl group Wooah
- Nana (rapper) (born 1968), German rapper and DJ
- Nana (opera), 1930s opera by Manfred Gurlitt
- Nana (album), the 1996 debut album of German rapper Nana
- "Na Na" (song), a 2014 song by Trey Songz
- Nana, female UK garage singer, most notably on the song "Body Groove" by Architechs
- "Na Na", a 1988 song by The Cockroaches from the album, Fingertips
- "NaNa", a song by Blaaze
- "NaNa", a 2013 song from the album Acid Rap by Chance the Rapper and Action Bronson
- "Nana", a 1986 single by The Checkers (Japanese band)
- "Nana", a composition by Federico Moreno Torroba

=== Television ===
- Nana (1981 miniseries), a French television miniseries with Véronique Genest
- Nana (1987 TV series), a Danish television series for children
- Nana (1995 television film), a film starring Bernadette Heerwagen
- "The Nana", an episode of the television show The O.C. (season 1)

=== Other uses in arts and entertainment ===
- Nana (novel), by Émile Zola
- Nana (Manet), a painting by Édouard Manet
- Nana (manga), by Ai Yazawa

== Places ==
- Nana, Rajasthan, India, a village
- Nana, Călărași, Romania, a commune
- Nána, Slovakia, a village and municipality
- Nana, Bangkok, Thailand, an intersection and neighborhood in Bangkok
  - Soi Nana (Chinatown), an alley in the Chinatown area of Bangkok
  - Nana BTS station, a BTS skytrain station in Bangkok

== Religion and mythology ==
- Nana (Greek mythology), a Phrygian demigoddess and the mother of Attis
- Nana (Kushan goddess), a Bactrian war goddess
- Nana Buluku, the supreme goddess of the Fon people of Benin
- Nane (goddess), also found as Nana, the Armenian goddess of war, wisdom, and motherhood
- Jnana, also spelled ñana, the concept of knowledge in Hinduism and Buddhism
- Nanaya, also transcribed as Nanâ, a goddess worshipped by the Sumerians and Akkadians

== Science and technology ==
- N-Acetylneuraminic acid, abbreviated NANA
- Nana technology, microchip-based technology designed to benefit older adults

== Other uses ==
- Nana, another name for grandmother
- Nana (title), an Akan chieftaincy title in Ghana
- Hurricane Nana, three hurricanes
- North American Newspaper Alliance (NANA), a large newspaper syndicate from 1922 to 1980
- NANA Regional Corporation, a for-profit Alaska Native Regional Corporation
  - NANA Development Corporation, owned by the above
- Nanadjara, or the Nana, an indigenous Australian group

== See also ==
- Nana mint, a common name for Mentha spicata 'Nana', a spearmint cultivar grown in Morocco
- Nana-berry, a common name for Rhus dentata, a deciduous tree species
- Naana, given name
- Nana 10, an Israeli web portal
- Nan (disambiguation)
- Nanas (disambiguation)
- Nanna (disambiguation)
- Nanny (disambiguation)
- Nanum (disambiguation)
- Nanus (disambiguation)
