= Nanami =

- Pronunciation: [nä.nä.mi] approx: NA-NA-MEE
- Gender: Female

Origin
- Origin: Japanese
- Meaning: different meanings depending on the kanji used
- Region of origin: Japanese

Other names
- Related names: Nana; Nanako

Nanami (ななみ, ナナミ) is a rather popular feminine Japanese given name which is also used as a surname.

== Written forms ==
Nanami can be written using different kanji characters and can mean:

as a given name

- 七海, "seven, sea"
- 七美, "seven, beauty"
- 七実, "seven, fruit"
- 七生, "seven, life"
- 奈波, "what, wave"
- 奈々美, "what, beauty"
- 奈々実, "what, fruit"
- 奈々生, "what, life"
- 菜々美, "greens, beauty"
- 菜々実, "greens, fruit"
- 菜々未, "greens, not yet"
- 菜々海, "greens, ocean"

The given name can also be written in hiragana or katakana.

as a surname

- 名波, "name, wave"

== People with the name ==
with the given name Nanami

- Nanami Abe (阿部 奈々美; born 1972), Japanese figure skating coach and choreographer
- Nanami Atsugi (厚木 那奈美; born 1997), Japanese voice actress
- Nanami Hashimoto (橋本 奈々未; born 1993), Japanese model, actress, radio personality and idol singer
- Nanami Hatano (波多野 七海; born 2006), Japanese professional wrestler
- Nanami Inoue (井上 奈々朱; born 1989), Japanese volleyball player
- Nanami Irie (入江 ななみ; born 1995), Japanese sport wrestler
- Nanami Kino (紀野 奈々美; born 1955), Japanese handball player
- Nanami Kitamura (北村 菜々美; born 1999), Japanese footballer
- Nanami Konishi (小西 夏菜実; born 2004), Japanese idol of idol group Hinatazaka46
- Nanami Kubota (窪田 七海; born 2004), Japanese idol of idol group Ocha Norma
- Nanami Naka (中 七海; born 1998), Japanese women's professional shogi player
- Nanami Nishikawa (西川 七海; born 1993), Japanese former idol of idol group Nogizaka46
- Nanami Ohta (大田 ななみ; born 1993), Japanese actress
- Nanami Onishi (大西七海), Japanese skateboarder
- Nanami Ōtsuka (大塚 七海; born 2000), Japanese idol of idol group NGT48
- Nanami Sakuraba (桜庭 ななみ; born 1992), Japanese gravure idol and actress
- Nanami Seki (関 菜々巳; born 1999), Japanese professional volleyball player
- Nanami Shiono (塩野 七生; born 1937), Japanese author and novelist
- Nanami Sone (曽根 七海; born 1999), Japanese professional footballer
- Nanami Takahashi (高橋 七実; born 2001), Japanese idol of idol group NGT48
- Nanami Takenaka (竹中 七海; born 1998), Japanese group rhythmic gymnast
- Nanami Takeuchi (竹内 ななみ; born 2004), Japanese idol of idol group Super Girls
- Nanami Yamashita (山下 七海; born 1995), Japanese voice actress
- Nanami Yanagawa (梁川 奈々美; born 2002), Japanese pop singer
- Nanami Yonetani (米谷 奈々未; born 2000), Japanese former idol of idol group Sakurazaka46

with the surname Nanami

- Hiroki Nanami (七海 ひろき; born 1972), Japanese actress, singer, voice actress, and former otokoyaku
- Hiroshi Nanami (名波 浩; born 1972), Japanese former professional footballer
- Karin Nanami (奈波 果林), Japanese voice actress and singer
- Shingo Nanami (七海 慎吾), Japanese manga artist

== Characters ==
- Nanami, a character in the 1968 film Hatsukoi Jigokuhen
- Nanami, a character from Magics.
- Nanami, a character in the role-playing game Suikoden II
- Nanami-chan, the title character in the NHK anime series Nanami-chan
- Nanami Aoyama, a character in Sakurasou No Pet Na Kanojo
- Nanami Agawa (七生), a character in the Kerberos saga franchise
- Nanami Ishikawa (七波), the central character in the manga Town of Evening Calm, Country of Cherry Blossoms
- Nanami Jinnai (菜々美), a character in the anime series El-Hazard
- Nanami Kiryuu (七実), a character from the anime and manga series Revolutionary Girl Utena
- Nanami Konoe (七海), the main heroine of the anime series Lamune
- Nanami Madobe (ななみ), the mascot character of the Japanese version of Windows 7
- Nanami Nono (七海), main character from the 2002 tokusastu series Ninpuu Sentai Hurricaneger
- Nanami Nishijō (七海), a character from the anime, game and manga series Chaos;Head
- Nanami Simpson, the main heroine of the anime series Tico of the Seven Seas
- Nanami Takahashi (七美), the central character of the manga series Bokura ga Ita
- Nanami Kai, a character from the anime and game series Sukisyo
- Jun Nanami (名波), a student in the 2003 film Battle Royale II: Requiem
- Lucia Nanami (七海), the main protagonist of the anime and manga series Mermaid Melody Pichi Pichi Pitch
- Nanami Yasuri (鑢 七実), sister of the main character and an antagonist from Katanagatari.
- Chiaki Nanami (七海千秋), one of the 16 students in the video game Danganronpa 2: Goodbye Despair.
- Nanami Haruka (七海), the main heroine of the game, manga and anime series Uta no Prince-sama
- Nanami Momozono (奈々生桃園), main character from the manga and anime series Kamisama Kiss
- Nanami (ナナミ), a character from the video game Ōkamiden
- Nanami Kanata (七海 哉太), one of the main guys of the game, manga, graphic novel, and anime series Starry Sky
- Nanami Takatsuki, a character from the Dog Days
- Nanami Arihara (七海 在原), a heroine from the visual novel RIDDLE JOKER
- Nanami Kento (七海), a character from the Jujutsu Kaisen manga and anime series
- Nanami Hiromachi (七美 広町), a character from the BanG Dream! music media franchise and bassist of the band Morfonica
- Nanami Ryusui (七海 龍水), a character from the Dr. Stone manga and anime series
- Nanami Sai (七海 サイ), a character from the Dr. Stone manga and anime series
- Nanami (ななみ), a character from the video game Dead or Alive Xtreme Venus Vacation
- Nanami Nanase, a character from the Gundam Build Divers
- Touko Nanami, a character from Bloom Into You

== Other uses ==
- Nanami-chan, the mascot character of the satellite television service NHK-BS

== See also ==
- FM Nanami, a Japanese local FM radio station
- Hatsukoi Jigokuhen, a 1968 Japanese film a.k.a. Nanami, The Inferno of First Love
