= Lawrence Becsegergely =

Hungarian clergyman

- Provost of Szenternye
- Installed: c. 1250
- Term ended: c. 1268
- Predecessor: first known
- Successor: Vida (next known, 1313–1317)
- Other post: Vice-chancellor of the Queen

Personal details
- Died: after 1268
- Denomination: Catholic

Lawrence from the kindred Becsegergely (Hungarian: Becsegergely nembeli Lőrinc; died after 1268) was a Hungarian clergyman of noble origin in the 13th century.

== Family and career ==
Lawrence was born into the gens (clan) Becsegergely, which possessed extensive landholdings in Tiszántúl and Transylvania. A royal charter, issued by Béla IV of Hungary on 9 March 1258, definitely stated that Lawrence belonged to this kindred. His parentage is unknown, but he was the grandson of James or John (mentioned in 1199). Lawrence had two brothers, John and Ernye. John was progenitor of the Léli (Tóti) noble family, which owned Lél, later Nagylél and the surrounding area in Komárom County (present-day a borough of Zlatná na Ostrove in Slovakia). This kinship flourished until the early 16th century.

Lawrence served as Provost of Szenternye (present-day a borough of Sremska Mitrovica, Serbia), at least from 1250 to 1268. He is the first known office-holder. The cathedral chapter belonged to the Diocese of Syrmia. Lawrence was first mentioned by contemporary records in November 1250, when he was granted the village of Dras (Drasch) by his superior, Oliver, Bishop of Syrmia. Pope Alexander IV confirmed this donation of land on 13 February 1255. Upon his request, Pope Innocent IV permitted him on 1 February 1252 to apply for other ecclesiastical and secular dignities, in addition to retaining his provostship, but there is no source for Lawrence's other positions in that period.

By the 1260s, Lawrence was employed in the retinue of Queen Maria Laskarina, wife of Béla IV. He functioned as vice-chancellor of the queenly court in 1268. Alongside Csák, son of Demetrius Csák, Lawrence acted as an arbiter in a lawsuit between the queen's servants and the Berki family (Michael and Stephen) over a land Deszka near Tárnok Valley, commissioned by Queen Maria, in November 1268. This is the last information on him. He was succeeded by a certain Stephen as vice-chancellor in 1269. The next known provost of Szenternye was Vida, who held the dignity in the 1310s.

== Sources ==
- Ternovácz, Bálint (2011). "A szerémi püspökök életrajza, valamint a kői, illetve a szenternyei székeskáptalan archontológiája a 14. század közepéig [The Biography of the Bishops of Szerém, and the Archontology of the Chapters of Kő and Szenternye until the Mid-14th Century]". Magyar Egyháztörténeti Vázlatok (in Hungarian). 23 (1–2): 33–47. ISSN 0865-5227.
- Zsoldos, Attila (2011). Magyarország világi archontológiája, 1000–1301 [Secular Archontology of Hungary, 1000–1301] (in Hungarian). História, MTA Történettudományi Intézete. ISBN 978-963-9627-38-3.

Catholic Church titles
Preceded by first known	Provost of Szenternye; 1250–1268	Succeeded by Vida
Political offices
Preceded by Stephen	Vice-chancellor of the Queen; 1268	Succeeded by Stephen
