= Carmen cherry =

Variety of apple

- Genus: Prunus
- Species: P. avium
- Cultivar: Carmen (S)
- Origin: Hungary variety improvement program., Hungary, 1999

The Carmen cherry is a variety of cherry that was bred by Brózik Sándor and Apostol János in Budapest-Érd, Hungary. It was first introduced in 1999 as a product of the Hungarian variety improvement program. Its parents are Sarga Dragan and H203 (1999).

== Characteristics ==
Carmen cherry is known for its large size and round shape, with some sources indicating that the fruit can reach diameters of 30–35 mm and weigh between 13 and 18 grams. The fruit is round in shape and has a bright dark red color. It is sweet with balanced acidity. In 2021, a Carmen cherry grown by Italian farmers Alberto and Giuseppe Rosso in Pecetto Torinese, near Turin, in Piedmont, set a new world record for the largest cherry, weighing in at 33.05 g (1.16 oz). The Rosso family has a long history of growing cherries, spanning over a century.

== Cultivation ==
Carmen cherry is mainly grown in Hungary and Germany, but it may also be grown in other countries.
