= Nanum =

Nanum may refer to:

- Nanum (king), a king of the Akkadian Empire who ascended the throne in 2257 BC
- Nanum, Queensland, a place in Far North Queensland, Australia
- Nanum Kodeeswaran, the Tamil title of the 2008 British film Slumdog Millionaire
- Nanum font, a unicode font designed especially for the Korean-language script
- Nanum (bicosoecid), a genus of heterokonts

== See also ==
- Nanu (disambiguation)
- Nana (disambiguation), the feminine form of the word
- Nanus (disambiguation), the masculine form of the word
