= Nanae =

Nanae may refer to:

- Nanae (given name), a feminine Japanese given name
- Nanae, Hokkaido, a town in Oshima Subprefecture, Hokkaido, Japan
  - Nanae Station, a railway station in the town of Nanae
- news.admin.net-abuse.email, a Usenet newsgroup
