= Nani =

Nani may refer to:

== People ==
- Alla Nani (1969–2026), Indian politician
- Nanai people of north Asia
- Nani (actor) (born 1984), Indian actor
- Nani (footballer) (born 1986), Portuguese footballer
- Antonio Nani (1842–1929), Maltese classical composer
- Gianluca Nani (born 1962), former technical director at West Ham United
- Kesineni Nani (born 1966), Indian politician
- Kodali Nani, Indian politician
- Nanabhoy Palkhivala (1920–2002), Indian jurist and economist
- Nani Roma (born 1972), Spanish rally racing driver
- Nani Alapai (1874–1928), Hawaiian soprano vocalist
- Nani family of Venice, members of which owned various palazzi:
  - Palazzo Barbarigo Nani Mocenigo
  - Palazzo Bernardo Nani
  - Palazzo Erizzo Nani Mocenigo
  - Palazzo Nani
- Perni Nani, Indian politician
- Pulivarthi Nani, Indian politician

== Places ==
- Nani, Afghanistan
- Ananiv, a town in Ukraine with the archaic Romanian name of Nani

== Music ==
- "Nani", 2019 song by Mr. Cardamom, with a video starring Madhur Jaffrey
- "Nani", 2024 song by Saweetie

== Other uses ==
- Nani Pelekai, a character from the 2002 animated Disney film, Lilo & Stitch, and its franchise
- Naani, 2004 Indian film

== See also ==
- Nanny (disambiguation)
