= M. nanus =

M. nanus may refer to:

- Merycopotamus nanus, an extinct anthracothere mammal species found in Asia
- Mesocapromys nanus, the dwarf hutia, a rodent species found only in Cuba
- Mimulus nanus, the dwarf purple monkeyflower, a plant species native to the western United States

== See also ==
- Nanus (disambiguation)
