= F. nana =

F. nana may refer to:

- Festuca nana, a plant species in the genus Festuca
- Fuchsia nana, a plant species in the genus Fuchsia

== See also ==
- Nana (disambiguation)
