= Lawrence Nánabeszter =

Hungarian clergyman

- Provost of Požega
- Appointed: 1286/88
- Term ended: after 1308/11
- Predecessor: Orbász Báncsa
- Successor: Michael (?)

Personal details
- Died: after 1308 (or 1311)
- Parents: Michael Nánabeszter

Lawrence from the kindred Nánabeszter (Hungarian: Nánabeszter nembeli Lőrinc; died after 1308/1311) was a Hungarian clergyman at the turn of the 13th and 14th centuries, who served as the provost of the collegiate chapter of Požega at least from 1288 to 1308.

== Biography ==
Lawrence was born into the Berki branch of the gens (clan) Nánabeszter, which possessed landholdings around the capitals Esztergom and Buda in Central Hungary. His father was Michael, who served as ispán of Veszprém County between 1243 and 1244. He had a brother Thomas. The brothers were granted the land of Érd by King Ladislaus IV in June 1278, which was formerly the uninhabited land of the royal armor-bearers. King Andrew III confirmed and transcribed the donation letter in September 1291.

Lawrence succeeded Orbász Báncsa as provost of Požega by 1288, when he was first mentioned in this capacity. Orbász last appeared two years before, in 1286. Beside that, Lawrence also functioned as the last chancellor of Queen Dowager Elizabeth, the widow of Stephen V and mother of the reigning monarch Ladislaus IV, from 1288 to 1290. Lawrence donated part of the land (Adriányfalva) purchased by the chapter to Peter, a canon of Požega and his brother, Zah, in exchange for an annual tax in 1292. Lawrence created the position of lector in his chapter, based on the sample of the cathedral of Pécs. He issued a charter in a case of dowry and donation in 1308. He was last mentioned by a non-authentic charter in 1311. His date of death is unknown; the next known provost of Požega, Michael appeared in this dignity eventually in 1329.

== Sources ==
- Horváth, Lajos (1993). "Érd 750 éves. Érd az Árpád-korban [Érd is 750 years old. Érd in the Age of the Árpáds]". Földrajzi Múzeumi Tanulmányok (in Hungarian). 12. Hungarian Geographical Museum: 3–9. ISSN 0237-3483.
- Koszta, László (1991). "A pozsegai káptalan tagjai a XIV. század közepéig [The Members of the Chapter of Požega until the mid-14th Century]". Aetas (in Hungarian). 6 (3–4). AETAS Könyv- és Lapkiadó Egyesület: 40–58. ISSN 0237-7934.
- Zsoldos, Attila (2011). Magyarország világi archontológiája, 1000–1301 [Secular Archontology of Hungary, 1000–1301] (in Hungarian). História, MTA Történettudományi Intézete. ISBN 978-963-9627-38-3.
