= Nanase =

- Pronunciation: Na-na-sé
- Gender: Female

Origin
- Origin: Japanese
- Meaning: It can have many different meanings depending on the kanji used.
- Region of origin: Japan

Other names
- Related names: Nana; Nanako

Nanase (ななせ, ナナセ) is a feminine Japanese given name which is also used as a surname.

== Written forms ==
Nanase can be written using different kanji characters and can mean:

as a given name

- 七瀬, "seven, rapids"
- 菜々瀬, "greens, rapids"
- 奈々瀬, "what, rapids"
- 那々瀬, "what, rapids"

as a surname

- 七瀬, "seven, rapids"

The given name can also be written in hiragana or katakana.

== People ==
with the given name Nanase

- Nanase Aikawa (七瀬), a Japanese rock singer
- Nanase Hoshii (七瀬), pseudonym of Yuma Hoshino, Japanese singer
- Nanase Kiryu (七瀬), Japanese football player
- Nanase Ohkawa (七瀬), a member of the all-female manga-creating team Clamp
- Nanase Nishino (七瀬), a member of the Japanese idol group Nogizaka46
- Nanase Shoji (七瀬), Japanese rhythmic gymnast

with the surname Nanase

- Aoi Nanase (七瀬), a Japanese manga artist and illustrator
- Ayaka Nanase (七瀬), Japanese voice actress
- Hikaru Nanase, pseudonym for Japanese singer and composer Masumi Itō

== Fictional characters ==
with the given name Nanase

- Nanase (七瀬), a character in the Street Fighter EX video game
- Nanase Akatsuki (七瀬), a character in the manga series Mamotte! Lollipop
- Nanase Hida (七瀬), a main heroine of the manga series Telepathic Wanderers
- Nanase Kudō (七瀬), a character in the Japanese light novel series Kaze no Stigma
- Nanase Matsuura (ナナセ), a character from the anime series Macross Frontier
- Nanase Matoba, a supporting character who is a secretary of the main antagonist of the ongoing manga/anime of Natsume's Book of Friends

with the surname Nanase

- Miyuki Nanase (七瀬), a character in the manga and anime series Kindaichi Case Files
- Riku Nanase (七瀬 陸), a main character in the musical video game and anime series Idolish7
- Rumi Nanase (七瀬), a character in the adult visual novel One: Kagayaku Kisetsu e
- Haruka Nanase (七瀬 遙), a main character in the anime series Free! - Iwatobi Swim Club
- Narue Nagase (七瀬 成恵), a female protagonist in the science fiction anime series The World of Narue
- Yū Nanase (七瀬 優), one of the characters in the dating simulation game Sentimental Graffiti
- Yui Nanase (七瀬 ゆい), a side character in the anime series Go! Princess PreCure

== Other uses ==
- Nanase Futatabi, a novel written by Yasutaka Tsutsui
