= Nanna =

Nanna may refer to:

- Grandmother
- Father

== Mythology ==
- Sin (mythology), god of the moon in Sumerian mythology, also called Nanna
- Nanna (Norse deity), goddess associated with the god Baldr in Norse mythology

== People ==
- Nanna Bryndís Hilmarsdóttir (born 1989), Icelandic singer
- Nanna Egedius (1913–1986), Norwegian figure skater
- Nanna Gotfredsen (born 1969), Danish politician
- Nanna Hoffman (1846–1920), Swedish entrepreneur
- Nanna Lüders Jensen (born 1963), Danish singer, stage name Nanna
- Nanna Stenersen (1914–1977), Norwegian actress
- Bob Nanna (born 1975), American singer and guitarist

== Science ==
- 1203 Nanna, an asteroid
- Nanna (moth), a genus of moth
- Nanna (fly), a genus of fly

== Other uses ==
- Nanna (serial), a Telugu television serial
- Nanna (album), a 2015 album by Xavier Rudd and the United Nations
- Nanna, North 24 Parganas, an outgrowth of Kanchrapara, West Bengal, India

== See also ==
- Inanna
- Nana (disambiguation)
- Nanha (died 1986), stage name of Pakistani film actor and comedian Rafi Khawar
- Naana, feminine given name
