= Nana (given name) =

- Pronunciation: /ˈnɑːnə/, /ˈnana/, /naˈna/
- Gender: varies

Origin
- Meaning: varies
- Region of origin: China, Cyprus, Ethiopia, Georgia, Ghana, Greece, India, Indonesia, Japan, Korea, Serbia, Taiwan

Other names
- Related names: Nani

Nana is a given name that has different origins in several countries across the world. Its use as a feminine or masculine name varies culturally. It is feminine in Japan, Korea, China, Taiwan, Georgia, Serbia, Cyprus, Greece and Finland, it is masculine in Ethiopia and India, and epicene (unisex/gender neutral) in Ghana and Indonesia. In Georgia, Nana is the fifth most popular given name for girls. In Ghana, among the Akan people, particularly the Akyem, Ashanti and Akuapim peoples, Nana is used as the title of a monarch to signify their status. Furthermore, the stool names of kings and queens are always preceded by Nana. Non-royal Ghanaian people also use Nana as a given name. In some cases, they may adopt the name Nana, if they have been named after a monarch. In Ghana, one can respectfully refer to a King or Queen as Nana without mentioning their full name; much like using "Your Highness". In India, nana means father in Telugu language and grandpa in Hindi and Urdu language from the mother's side. In Britain, Australia and New Zealand Nana or nana means grandmother(Concise Oxford Dictionary; 9th edition, 1995).

== People ==
=== Acting ===
- Nana Ama McBrown (born 1977), a Ghanaian actress
- Nana Asakawa (born 1999), a Japanese voice actress
- Nana Bryant (1888–1955), an American film actress
- Nana Eikura (born 1988), a Japanese model and actress
- Nana Gbewonyo (born 1980), a Ghanaian actor
- Nana Gouvêa (born 1975), a Brazilian actress
- Nana Han (born 1979), a South Korean actress
- Nana Jorjadze (born 1948), a Georgian film director and scriptwriter
- Nana Katase (born 1981), a Japanese actress
- Nana Kato (born 1998), a Japanese model and actress
- Nana Komatsu (born 1996), a Japanese model and actress
- Nana Mirdad (born 1985), an Indonesian actress
- Nana Ozaki (actress) (born 1948), a Japanese actress
- Nana Palsikar (1907–1984), an Indian film actor
- Nana Patekar (1951–2026), an Indian actor and filmmaker
- Nana Visitor (born 1957), an American actress
- Nana Yamaguchi (born 1938), a Japanese voice actress
- Nana Yanagisawa (born 1987), a Japanese actress and fashion model

=== Art ===
- Nana Haruta (born 1985), a Japanese manga artist
- Nana Meskhidze (1936–1997), a Georgian artist-painter

=== Music ===
- Nana (entertainer) (born 1991), a South Korean actress and singer
- Nana (entertainer, born 2001), a South Korean singer, actress, and dancer, member of the group Wooah
- Nana (rapper) (born 1968), a German rapper and DJ
- Nana Bao (born 1950), a Taiwanese singer
- Nana Caymmi (1941–2025), a Brazilian singer
- Nana Gualdi (1932–2007), a German actress and singer
- Nana Hedin (born 1968), a Swedish singer
- Nana Kitade (born 1987), a Japanese J-Rock singer
- Nana Mahazan (born 1983), a Malaysian Akademi Fantasia contestant
- Nana Mizuki (born 1980), a Japanese voice actress and singer
- Nana Mori (born 2001), a Japanese actress and singer
- Nana Mouskouri (born 1934), a Greek singer
- Nana Okada (singer, born 1959), a Japanese idol and actress
- Nana Okada (born 1997), a Japanese idol and member of the groups AKB48 & STU48
- Nana Ou-yang (born 2000), a Taiwanese actress and singer
- Nana Owada (born 1999), a former member of the Japanese idol girl group AKB48
- Nana Kwame Abrokwa (born 1968), a German rapper and DJ
- Nana Tanimura (born 1987), a Japanese pop singer
- Naná Vasconcelos (1944–2016), a Brazilian Latin jazz percussionist, vocalist and berimbau player
- Nana Wang, a Chinese record producer

=== Politics ===
- Nana (chief) (1800?–1896), a Chiricahua Apache leader
- Nana Akufo-Addo (born 1944), President of the Republic of Ghana
- Nana Effah-Apenteng, the Permanent Representative of Ghana to the United Nations
- Nana Fadnavis (1742–1800), an influential minister and statesman of the Maratha Empire in Pune, India
- Nana Guo, a Chinese politician
- Nana Kofi Twumasi-Ankrah (born 1979), Equerry to Queen Elizabeth II
- Nana of Iberia, a 4th-century Georgian queen
- Nana Olomu (1852–1916), an Itsekiri chief and merchant from the Niger Delta region of southern Nigeria
- Nana Osei Bonsu II (born 1939), the regent of the Ashanti Kingdom
- Nana Owusu-Nsiah, a Ghanaian diplomat and ambassador
- Nana Patil (1900–1976), an Indian independence activist
- Nana Sahib (1824–?), an Indian leader during the rebellion of 1857
- Nana Sir Ofori Atta I (1881–1943), a King of Akyem Abuakwa in 1912

=== Religion ===
- Nana Dharmadhikari (1922–2008), an Indian spiritual guru
- Nana of Pécs, a 12th-century bishop in the Kingdom of Hungary

=== Sports ===
- Nana Alexandria (born 1949), a Georgian chess Grandmaster
- Nana Arhin Duah (born 1980), a Ghanaian football player
- Nana Attakora (born 1989), a Canadian football player
- Nana Boateng (footballer, born 1994), a Ghanaian football player
- Nana Boateng (footballer, born 2002), an English football player
- Nana Eshun (born 1969), a Ghanaian football player
- Nana Eshun (footballer, born 1982), a Ghanaian football player
- Nana Falemi (born 1974), a Romanian-Cameroonian football player
- Nana Fujimoto (born 1989), Japanese ice hockey player
- Nana Ichise (born 1997), Japanese woman footballer
- Nana Ioseliani (born 1962), a Georgian chess player
- Nana Iwasaka (born 1990), a Japanese volleyball player
- Nana Joshi (1926–1987), a cricketer
- Nana Konadu (born 1964), a retired Ghanaian boxer
- Nana Kuffour (born 1985), a Ghanaian-American soccer player
- Nana Miyagi (born 1971), a Japanese American tennis player
- Nana Ofori-Twumasi (born 1990), a professional Ghanaian-born English footballer
- Nana Takeda (born 1988), a Japanese figure skater
- Nana Wu (born 1990), a Chinese handball player

=== Other ===
- Nana Asma’u (1793–1864), a poet, teacher and a revered figure in northern Nigeria
- Nana Chudasama (1933–2018), an eminent jurist, former mayor and Sheriff of Mumbai
- Nana Keum (born 1983), a South Korean author and beauty pageant titleholder
- Nana Klutse (born 1981), a Ghanaian climate scientist
- Nana Kwame Adjei-Brenyah (born 1991), a US-American author
- Nana Nánabeszter, a 13th-century Hungarian nobleman and soldier
- Nana Natsume (born 1980), a Japanese former AV idol and celebrity
- Nana Ozaki (born 1982), a Japanese gravure idol

== Fictional characters ==
- Nana, a grandma in Harry and His Bucket Full of Dinosaurs
- Nana, the Newfoundland dog nurse of Wendy, John and Michael in Peter Pan
- Nana, the protagonist of Émile Zola's novel, Nana
- Nana, a character in the Elfen Lied series
- Nana, one of the two playable characters in the video game Ice Climber
- Nana, a rabbit android character from Cyborg Kuro-chan
- Nana, a character in the novel Transcendent Kingdom by Yaa Gyasi
- Nana, a female cat humanoid character in Mobile Legends
- Nana Aokaze, a character in the 2025 anime series You and Idol Pretty Cure
- Nana Asahina, minor character from the tokusatsu Kamen Rider Kuuga
- Nana Astar Deviluke, a character in the manga series To Love Ru
- Nana Daiba, a character in the Revue Starlight franchise
- Nana Dawson, a character in Heroes
- Nana Heeler, the mother of Bandit Heeler in Bluey
- Nana Hiiragi, the protagonist in the Japanese manga, Talentless Nana
- Nana Komatsu (Nana), a character in the Japanese manga Nana
- Nana McQueen, a character in Hollyoaks
- Nana Mikazuki, a character in Time Patrol Tai Otasukeman
- Nana Moon, a character in the popular British BBC soap opera EastEnders
- Nana Osaki, a character in the Japanese manga Nana
- Nana Oyl, the mother of cartoon character Olive Oyl
- Nana Shimura, a character in the popular Japanese manga, My Hero Academia
- Nana Shinozaki, a character in the 2023 anime series Power of Hope: PreCure Full Bloom
- Nana Sunohara, a character from the Japanese manga Miss Caretaker of Sunohara-sou
- Nana Kōgei Ciel, a character in the music game Sound Voltex
