= Naana =

Naana is a feminine given name of Ghanaian origin.

== List of people with the given name ==
- Naana Agyei-Ampadu, British actress of Ghanaian descent
- Naana Eyiah Quansah (born 1963), Ghanaian politician
- Jane Naana Opoku-Agyemang (born 1951), Ghanaian academic and politician
- Naana Oppon (born 2006), British athlete of Ghanaian descent
- Naana Otoo-Oyortey, Ghanaian social activist

== See also ==
- Nana (disambiguation)
- Nanna (disambiguation)
