= Nanas =

Nanas may refer to:

- Nanas, Iran, a village in West Azerbaijan Province
- Les Nanas, a 1985 French comedy film with an entirely female ensemble
- Nanas (flamenco palo) a flamenco musical form
- Nanas, a series of sculptures by Niki de Saint Phalle
- Club Ñañas, an Ecuadorian women's football club

== See also ==
- Nana (disambiguation)
