= Norbert Rátót =

Hungarian nobleman

Ispán of Veszprém
- Reign: 1246–1247
- Predecessor: Michael Nánabeszter
- Successor: Philip Ákos
- Born: Unknown
- Died: after 1247
- Noble family: gens Rátót

Norbert from the kindred Rátót (Hungarian: Rátót nembeli Norbert; died after 1247) was a Hungarian distinguished nobleman from the gens Rátót, who served as ispán (comes) of Veszprém County from 1246 to 1247.

His kinship relation to the other members of the kindred is unknown; but his brother ("frater") was Reynold, formerly also ispán of the county from 1237 to 1238, whose seal proves his origin from the kindred Rátót.

== Sources ==
- Körmendi, Tamás (2009). "A magyarországi nemzetségi címerek kialakulásának kérdéséhez". Századok (in Hungarian). 143 (2). Magyar Történelmi Társulat: 391–426. ISSN 0039-8098.
- Zsoldos, Attila (2011). Magyarország világi archontológiája, 1000–1301 [Secular Archontology of Hungary, 1000–1301] (in Hungarian). História, MTA Történettudományi Intézete. ISBN 978-963-9627-38-3.

Reynold Genus Rátót Born: ? Died: after 1247
Political offices
Preceded by Michael Nánabeszter	Ispán of Veszprém; 1246–1247	Succeeded by Philip Ákos
