= Reynold Rátót =

Hungarian nobleman

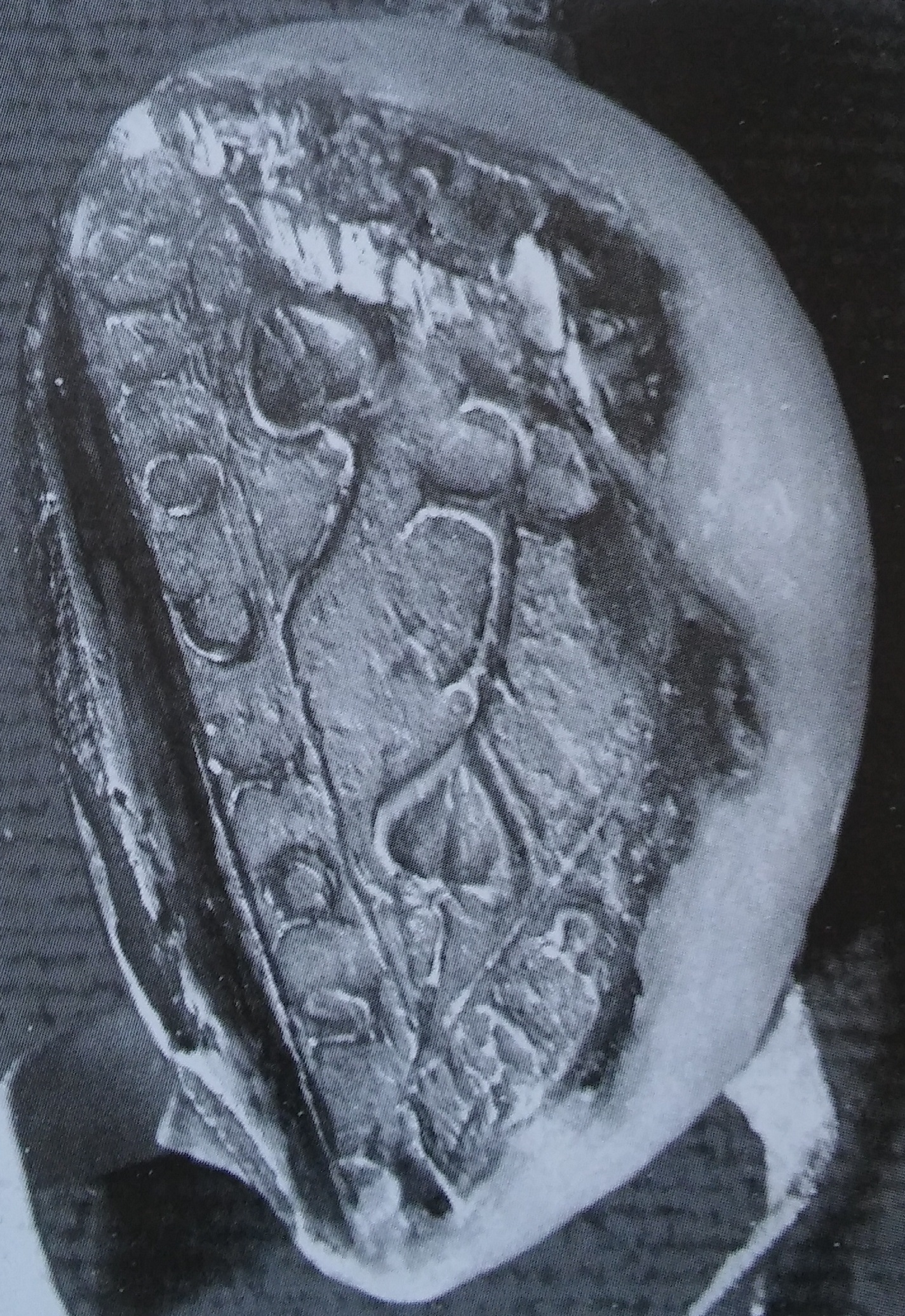
- Seal of Reynold Rátót, 1237

Ispán of Veszprém
- Reign: 1237–1238
- Predecessor: Atyusz Atyusz
- Successor: Michael Nánabeszter
- Born: Unknown
- Died: after 1238
- Noble family: gens Rátót

Reynold from the kindred Rátót (Hungarian: Rátót nembeli Rénold; died after 1238) was a Hungarian distinguished nobleman from the gens Rátót, who served as ispán (comes) of Veszprém County from 1237 to 1238.

== Career ==
Formerly, historian Pál Engel identified him as Reynold from the kindred Básztély, although Mór Wertner had doubted in the truthful of that identification in the previous century. Moreover, Reynold's seal (1237) refers to his origin from the kindred Rátót. He had a brother Norbert, also ispán of Veszprém County later.

In 1237, Reynold (or Regnald) judged over a lawsuit between the cathedral chapter of Veszprém and a local noble, Keselő Gyipolti.

== Sources ==
- Körmendi, Tamás (2009). "A magyarországi nemzetségi címerek kialakulásának kérdéséhez". Századok (in Hungarian). 143 (2). Magyar Történelmi Társulat: 391–426. ISSN 0039-8098.
- Solymosi, László (2006). Írásbeliség és társadalom az Árpád-korban [Literacy and Society in the Age of Árpáds] (in Hungarian). Argumentum Kiadó. ISBN 963-446-384-3.
- Zsoldos, Attila (2011). Magyarország világi archontológiája, 1000–1301 [Secular Archontology of Hungary, 1000–1301] (in Hungarian). História, MTA Történettudományi Intézete. ISBN 978-963-9627-38-3.

Reynold Genus Rátót Born: ? Died: after 1238
Political offices
Preceded by Atyusz Atyusz	Ispán of Veszprém; 1237–1238	Succeeded by Michael Nánabeszter
