= Nanae Fujiwara =

Japanese guitarist

- Born: Okayama, Japan
- Genres: Classical
- Occupations: Guitarist, teacher
- Instrument: Guitar
- Website: http://www.nanaeguitar.com

Nanae Fujiwara (Japanese: 藤原奈苗, romanized: Fujiwara, Nanae）is a Japanese guitarist based in Chicago and a co-founder of the Lyra Guitar Quartet. Fujiwara is noted for her performance and promotion of the Spanish Classical Guitar repertoire on social media and to the public. Nanae currently serves on the board of the Chicago Classical Guitar Society.

== Biography ==
Nanae Fujiwara was born in Okayama, Japan. Her family moved to Chicago, Illinois for work when she was in elementary school. Nanae grew up between Japan and the United States throughout her childhood. Fujiwara studied voice from the age of 8 and started learning guitar at 15 when she discovered the Japanese folk guitar duo called Yuzu.

After graduating from high school, Fujiwara pursued an associate degree in Music from William Rainey Harper College. She became interested in classical guitar, a long-time hobby of her mother, and quickly devoted herself to mastering the instrument. At the age of 20, Fujiwara learned to read musical notation. Fujiwara then earned her bachelor's degree in Classical Guitar performance from Northeastern Illinois University where she graduated magna cum laude under the tutelage of Brian Torosian. In 2013, Fujiwara was a semi-finalist in the Wilson Center Guitar Competition. In 2017, Fujiwara earned her Master's in Classical Guitar Performance from the University of Alicante where she studied under Pepe Romero, Manuel Barrueco, David Russell, Fabio Zanon, and other guitar legends.

Since completing her master's, Fujiwara has focused her performance career on showcasing music by Albeniz, Rodrigo, Tarrega, and Llobet.

In 2020, Fujiwara became an affiliate of the classical guitar non-profit, Ex-Aequo, most notable for her participation as a performer in the "Changing the Canon" project which significantly expanded the repertoire of classical guitar pieces composed by black composers.
