= Ethel Eshun =

Ghanaian singer and songwriter

Queen eShun
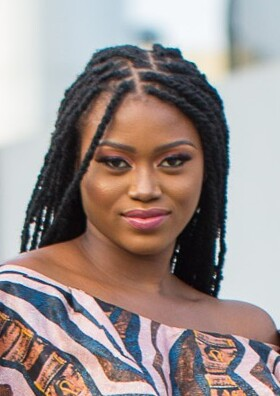

Background information
- Born: Ethel Esi Eshun; 7 June 1994 (age 31); Accra, Ghana
- Origin: Cape Coast, Ghana
- Occupations: Singer; songwriter; performer
- Instrument: Vocal
- Years active: 2009–present
- Label: Eshun Music

Ethel Esi Eshun popularly known as Queen eShun is a Ghanaian singer and songwriter known for hits including "Someone Loves Me", "Akyia", "Koti ma no", and "Fa Me Kor". (Fa Me Kor in the Akan language literally means "Take me away".) eShun was made a Queen on 28 December 2019, at Gomoa Afransi, in the Central Region of Ghana, by Ogyeedom Obrenu Kwesi Atta VI, the paramount chief of Gomoa Afransi transitional area.

== Early life and career ==
Prior to breaking into the Ghanaian music scene, she was a participant of Nigeria's Glo X-Factor, where she won the first runner-up spot. She also took part in other two reality shows, namely MTN Project Fame and TV3 Mentor. In 2016, she launched an initiative called Eshun Healthcare Project in the Central Region of Ghana, focused on quality healthcare delivery in Ghana. Eshun parted ways with Quophi Mens Label after her contract ended and founded a new management team called Eshun Music.

== Performances ==
- 6th edition of the African legends Night 2017.

== Awards and nominations ==
Awards won by eShun and her nominations
Year	Award ceremony	Award presented	Nominated work/recipient	Result	Ref
2015	Central Music Awards	Female Vocalist of the Year	Herself	Won	
2016	Central Music Awards	Female Artiste of the Year	Herself	Won	
2017	Central Music Awards	Artiste of the Year	Herself	Won	
2017	Central Music Awards	Collaboration of the Year	Simple As ABC	Won	
2017	Vodafone Ghana Music Awards	Unsung Artiste of the Year	Herself	Nominated	
2019	Ghana Actors and Entertainers Awards	Female Vocalist of the Year	Herself	Won	

Songs	Year released
Someone Loves Me Ft. FlowKing Stone	2017
Akyia	2018
I Want	2018
Talk Talk	2019
Party Ft. Kofi Kinaata	2019
Temptation	2019
Koti Ma No	2019
