= Nani, Afghanistan =

Nani نانی
- Location within Afghanistan
- Coordinates: 33°23′48″N 68°21′14″E
- Country: Afghanistan
- Province: Ghazni

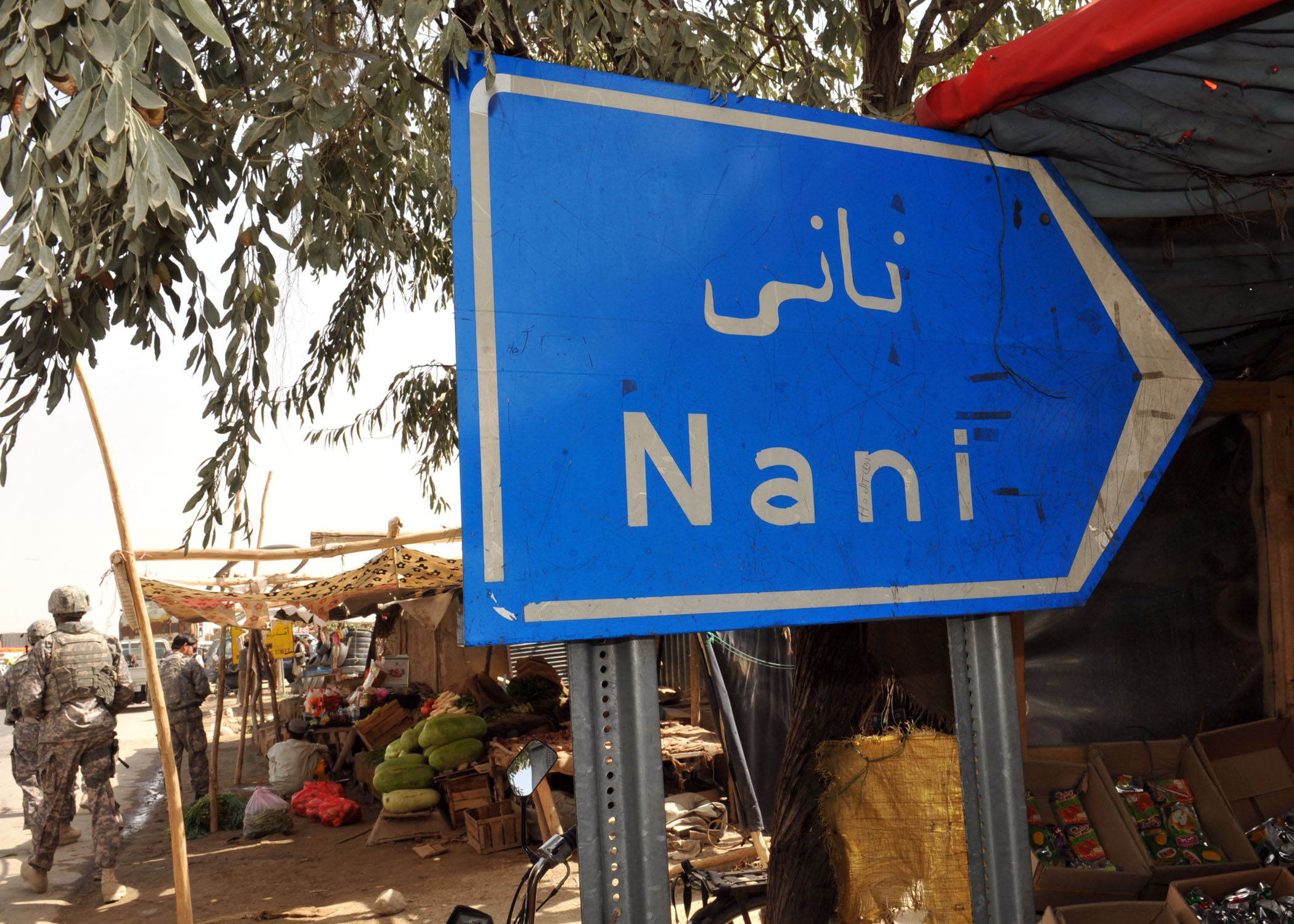
Street sign

Nani (Pashto: نانی) is a town in Ghazni Province, Afghanistan. It lies along highway A01.

== See also ==
- Ghazni Province
