= Nanae (given name) =

- Gender: Female

Origin
- Origin: Japanese
- Meaning: Different meanings depending on the kanji used

Nanae (written: 七恵, 奈苗, 奈々絵, なな恵 or ななえ in hiragana) is a feminine Japanese given name. Notable people with the name include:

- Nanae Aoyama (青山 七恵; born 1983), Japanese writer
- Nanae Chrono (黒乃 奈々絵; born 1980), Japanese manga artist
- Nanae Fujiwara (藤原 奈苗; born 1980), Japanese guitarist
- Nanae Haruno (榛野 なな恵), Japanese manga artist
- Nanae Katō (加藤 奈々絵; born 1976), Japanese voice actress
- Nanae Sasaki (佐々木 七恵; 1956–2009), Japanese long-distance runner
- Nanae Sasaya (ささや ななえ; born 1950), Japanese manga artist
- Nanae Suzuki (鈴木 菜々江; born 1992), Japanese professional boxer
- Nanae Takahashi (高橋 奈苗; born 1978), Japanese professional wrestler
- Nanae Takizawa (滝沢 ななえ; born 1987), Japanese volleyball player
- Nanae Tanaka (田中 奈々絵; born 1975), Japanese fencer

== Fictional characters ==
- Nanae Fujieda (藤枝 七恵), a character in the anime series Sky Girls
- Nanae Kayama (香山七重), a character in the anime series Super Doll Licca-chan
