= Llobet =

Llobet (Eastern Catalan: [ʎuˈβɛt]) is a surname of Catalan origin and may refer to:

- Francisco Llobet, Spanish sailor
- Joan Serra Llobet (1927–2015), Spanish water polo player
- Josep Llobet (1875–1937), Spanish footballer
- Miguel Llobet (1878–1938), Spanish classical guitarist
- Toni Llobet, Catalan artist and illustrator of several bird and wildlife books
- Xavier Llobet (born 1974), Spanish triathlete
