= Nanus =

Nanus may refer to:

- Nanus (beetle), a genus of true weevils
- Susan Nanus, the scriptwriter for the 1998 A Will of their Own romantic drama TV mini-series aired on the NBC network
- Fort Nanus in Goa, India
- one of the main hybrid groups of the ornamental flower Gladiolus

== See also ==
- nana (disambiguation), the feminine form of the word
- Nanu (disambiguation)
- Nanum (disambiguation), the neuter form of the word
