= Nanu =

Nanu may refer to:

== People ==
- D. Nanu (1873–1943), Romanian poet
- Alina Nanu (born 1990), Moldovan ballet dancer
- Emil Nanu (born 1981), a Romanian football player, plays for FC Callatis Mangalia
- Florin Nanu (born 1983), a Romanian football player, plays for ACS Poli Timișoara
- Ștefan Nanu (born 1968), a former Romanian football player, now a coach
- Nanu Singh Saini, 18th century Sikh general
- Nanu (footballer) (born 1994), a Bissauguinean footballer, full name Eulânio Ângelo Chipela Gomes

== Places ==
- Nanu, Iran, a village in Kerman Province, Iran
- Nanu River, a tributary of the Valea Pinului River in Romania

== NANU ==
- National Academy of Sciences of Ukraine (Natsional’na akademiya nauk Ukrayiny)
- Notice Advisory to NAVSTAR Users (NAVSTAR referring to the Global Positioning System)
- Namibia Nurses Union

== Other uses ==
- Nānū or Mann's Gardenia (Gardenia mannii or Gardenia remyi), a species of flowering tree in the coffee family
- Nanu, a fictional character in Disney's 1973 film The World's Greatest Athlete
- The female polar bear in the 2007 Arctic Tale documentary film
- Nanu, a character in the Pokémon games

== See also ==
- Nanus (disambiguation)
- "Nanu nanu", a catchphrase of Mork's in the television show Mork & Mindy
