= Nana technology =

Microchip-based technology for aiding older adults

"Nana" Technology is microchip based technology designed, intended, or that can otherwise be used to improve quality of life for older adults.

== History and usage of the term ==
The term “Nana” technology was coined in 2004 by Andrew Carle, an assistant professor at George Mason University in Fairfax, Virginia.

Carle's goal was to bridge what he referred to as the 'divide between Geeks and Grans', in which technology companies were failing to consistently develop products of practical value to older adults, with older adults simultaneously unaware of technologies that did exist and could be helpful in their daily lives. Carle additionally felt governments were not paying enough attention to issues relevant to aging populations worldwide – both in stresses on family caregivers struggling to allow aging parents to live independently for as long as possible, as well as on the critical shortage of long-term care workers in both home and facility based environments.

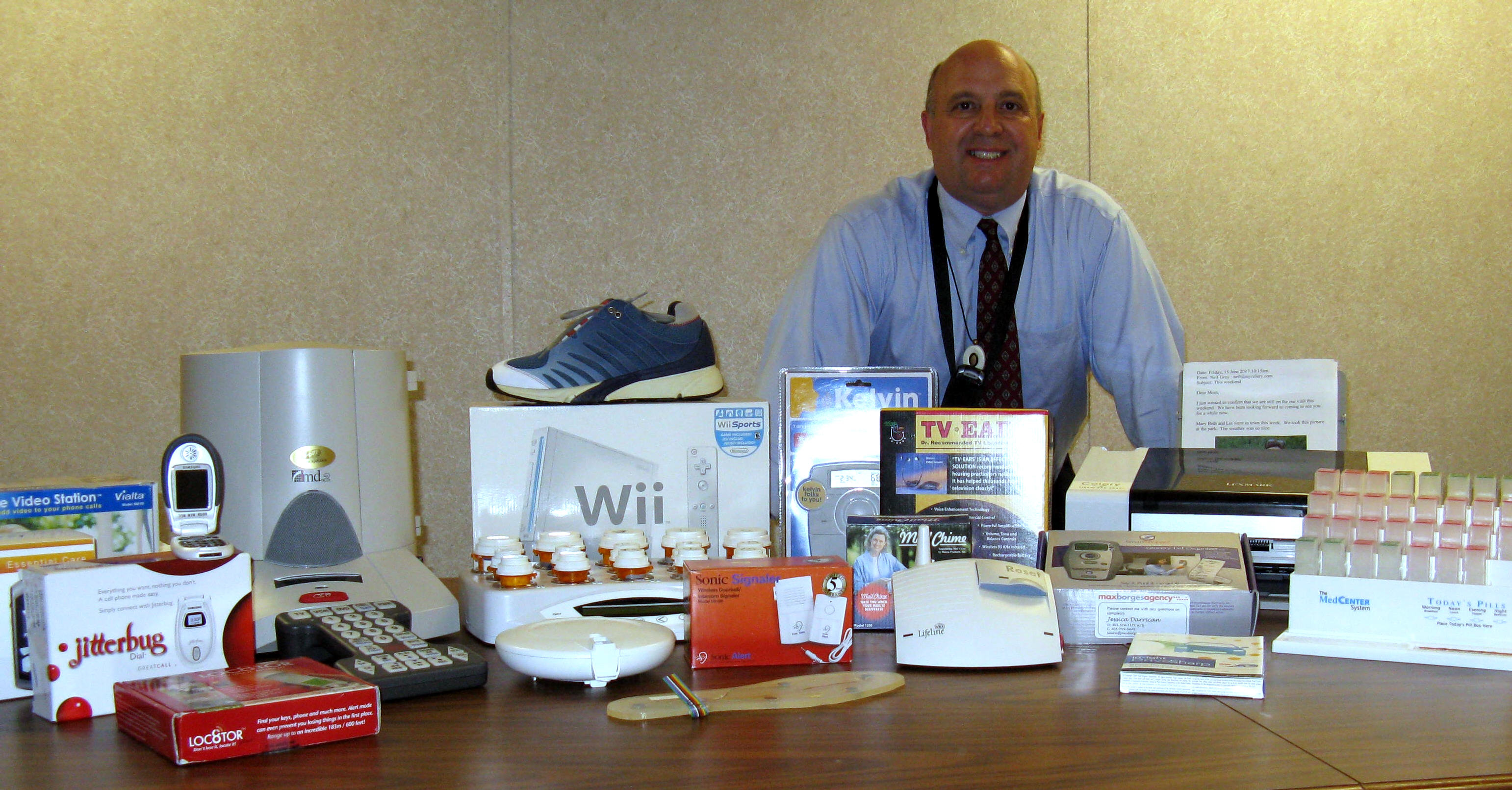
Andrew Carle with samples of "Nana" Technology.

A word play on the scientific field of nanotechnology, “Nana” technology is loosely directed to imply technologies for someone's grandmother, or “Nana”. Carle was the first person to advance the use of this phrase with a formal definition, and one focused exclusively on microchip technologies, with the result of naming a new and distinct subset of the technology services industry. Carle's term and specific application were first nationally published in a feature article in USA TODAY on August 9, 2006. Since that time Carle's term and/or definition has been published, quoted, or featured in or on numerous media worldwide including but not limited to: CNN, CNBC, CBS News, Fox News, PBS, NPR, Forbes, Smart Money, BBC, Agence France-Presse, KYODO News Service, and the Australian Broadcast Corporation, among others.

Since defining the sector, Carle has served as a consultant or adviser to a number of companies with an interest in developing technologies for older adults, including APPLE, Nintendo, Vigorous Mind, and GTX Corporation. With GTX, he helped develop the first GPS shoe for individuals with Alzheimer's and related dementia, who may be at risk of wandering and becoming lost. In 2012, the technology was recognized as one of the "100 Most Important Inventions of Mankind" by the National Museum of Science and Technology in Stockholm, Sweden.

== Categories ==
In addition to the term and definition, Carle has established eight categories to date for “Nana” technologies, and as they pertain to areas most relevant to individuals over the age of 65:

Health and Wellness: Including technologies such as those for managing medications, monitoring vital signs, or treating medical conditions typically affecting older adults.

Safety: Including technologies for preventing or reducing falls, monitoring for or requesting emergency assistance, or tracking or preventing wandering among individuals with Alzheimer's related dementia.

Cognition: Includes technologies intended to improve overall cognitive functioning as affected by normal aging, mild cognitive impairment (MCI), Alzheimer's disease or related dementia.

Communication: Includes technologies that allow older adults to communicate electronically via phone, internet, video, or other forms of communication.

Sensory: Includes technologies that assist older adults affected by reduction or loss of vision, hearing, taste, touch, or smell.

Mobility: Includes technologies such as those that assist older adults in ambulation, transportation, or driving.

Lifestyle: Includes technologies that assist older adults in day-to-day functioning including meal preparation, housekeeping/home maintenance, bathing, dressing, etc.

Robotics/Whole Home Systems: Includes technologies that can self perform assistive tasks, and/or which combine two or more of the above categories into a single system.

== Examples of Current "Nana" Technologies ==
Carle has released or presented multiple Top "Nana" Technologies opinion lists, which have been published in numerous national and international media. Featured below is a sample of technologies mentioned or similar to those identified during a presentation at the AARP Life@50+ National Event & Expo in Washington, DC:

GPS SmartSole
For individuals with Alzheimer's who may wander and become lost. A shoe insole that includes GPS location technology. Additionally includes the ability to program a safety "geozone", outside of which authorized caregivers will receive email or text alerts providing satellite map location of the wearer.

Philips Medication Dispensing System
A “bubble gum” style table top dispenser that releases pills at pre-programmed times, while providing audio and visual reminders. If pills are not taken within a designated time, the machine automatically telephones up to five family members, friends, or a professional call center to report the missed dosage.

Jitterbug Cell Phone
Designed with simple to see and use features, including oversized buttons, increased screen size and brightness, and a cushioned ear rest.

GrandCare Systems
A sensor based system the remotely monitors motion and related activity in the home, providing alerts for activity detected as unusual or dangerous. The system additionally provides tele-health and communication capabilities.

== Future Technologies ==
Carle has repeatedly referenced “Nana” Technologies being researched or developed for future application. Examples cited by Carle have included a medicine cabinet featuring both face recognition and voice communication capabilities, a “smart shirt” that can monitor vital signs and administer CPR in the event of an emergency, "sensory" shoe inserts that can provide older adults with the same balance as a 20-year-old, and a personal assistance robot that can hear, see, and smell.

== Trademark and Copyright ==
The trade name "Nana" Technology is trademarked to Carle and used commercially, among other uses, as a licensed designation for "best of show" winners of an annual, national competition of technologies for older adults. No company or person may use the "Nana" Technology designation in commercial use for their products and/or personal gain without permission or licensure of such use from Andrew Carle.

Intellectual property rights for the "Nana" Technology term, definition, and categories are additionally copyrighted to Carle (2004), as originally published and presented in his course lectures at George Mason University, and in subsequent articles published by Carle. In this regard, use of the term to describe such technologies must be properly sourced, as well as meet the definition and categories established by Carle.
