= FM Nanami =

- Japan
- Broadcast area: Hiroshima / Hatsukaichi
- Frequency: 77.3 (MHz)
- Branding: "JOZZ8AK-FM"

Programming
- Format: Defunct (was News/Talk/Music)

History
- First air date: April 18, 2004
- Call sign meaning: Itsukaichi Community Broadcast

Technical information
- ERP: 20 watts

Itsukaichi Community Broadcast (FM Nanami) was a Japanese community FM radio station in Saeki-ku, Hiroshima.

The station was founded on November 7, 2003, and went on the air on April 18, 2004.

The station stopped broadcasting on December 1, 2007, and closed on March 31, 2008.
