= Nanaka =

Nanaka may refer to:

== People ==
- Nanaka Honda (本田 ななか; born 2001), Japanese kickboxer
- Nanaka Kawamura, (川村 虹花) Japanese idol and former member of Kamen Joshi
- Nanaka Kobayashi, (小林 菜々香; born 1992) Japanese singer and former member of Bright (Japanese band)
- Nanaka Kori (郡 菜々佳; born 1997), Japanese athlete
- Nanaka Mogami, (最上 奈那華; born 2001) Japanese idol and member of HKT48
- Nanaka Ozawa, (小澤 奈々花) Japanese idol and former member of X21 (group)
- Nanaka Suwa (諏訪 ななか; born 1994), Japanese voice actress and singer
- Nanaka Tomita, (冨田 菜々風) Japanese idol and member of ≠Me

== Characters ==
- Nanaka a character from the light novel series May I Ask for One Final Thing?
- Nanaka a character from the visual novel series Cross Channel (video game)
- Nanaka Haibara a character from the manga series The World God Only Knows
- Nanaka Hiraki a character from the manga series Million Yen Women
- Nanaka Kirisato a character from the manga series Nanaka 6/17
- Nanaka Kotegawa a character from the manga series Grand Blue Dreaming
- Nanaka Morishima a character from the rhythm game series Love Live! School Idol Festival
- Nanaka Nakatomi a character from the anime series Magic User's Club
- Nanaka Shimada a character from the manga series X-Day (manga)
- Nanaka Shirakawa a character from the visual novel series Da Capo II
- Nanaka Takanashi a character from the manga series I Don't Like You at All, Big Brother!!
- Nanaka Yatsushiro a character from the visual novel series Myself ; Yourself
- Nanaka Yuugiri a character from the visual novel series Twinkle Crusaders
- Koyomi Hare Nanaka a character from the manga series Girls Bravo

== Other uses ==
- Nanaka 6/17, a manga
- former name of Nana, Rajasthan, a village in India
