= Nana Eshun (footballer, born 1982) =

Ghanaian footballer

Personal information
- Date of birth: 12 December 1982 (age 43)
- Place of birth: Kumasi, Ghana
- Height: 1.83 m (6 ft 0 in)
- Position: Striker

Team information
- Current team: Asyut Petroleum
- Number: 28

Senior career*
Years	Team	Apps	(Gls)
1998–1999	King Faisal Babes		
1999–2001	Udinese		
2001–2002	Borussia Dortmund II	2	(0)
2003–2004	Lokomotivi Tbilisi	20	(6)
2005–2006	Universitario de Deportes		
2006	Prampram Mighty Royals FC		
2006–2008	Tanta FC		
2008–2009	Tema Youth		
2009	Al-Masry Club		
2009–	Asyut Petroleum		
- * Club domestic league appearances and goals as of 30 April 2011

Nana Eshun (born 12 December 1982) is a Ghanaian footballer who plays for Asyut Petroleum of the Egyptian Premier League, as a striker.

== Career ==
Eshun has played in Ghana for King Faisal Babes, in Italy for Udinese, in Germany for Borussia Dortmund and SF Neitersen, and in Georgia for Lokomotivi Tbilisi. He moved to Peruvian side Universitario de Deportes in April 2004. In July 2009, while contracted to Ghanaian side Berekum Chelsea, Eshun went on trial with Egyptian side Zamalek, eventually signing for league rivals Asyut Petroleum in January 2010. He made his debut for Asyut Petroleum in March 2010.
