= Nanny (disambiguation) =

A nanny is a child's caregiver.

Nanny may also refer to:

- A female goat
- A Cajun word for godmother (see godparent)
- An affectionate term for grandmother

== Places ==
- River Nanny, a watercourse in Ireland

== People ==
- Nanny of the Maroons, 18th-century leader of the Jamaican Maroons
- Nanny Still (1926–2009), Finnish designer
- Édouard Nanny (1872–1942), double bass player, teacher, and composer

== Art, entertainment, and media ==
=== Fictional characters ===
See Nanny, Fictional representations

=== Films ===
- The Nanny (1965 film), a 1965 British suspense film starring Bette Davis (based on Merriam Modell's novel)
- The Nanny (1999 film), a 1999 Italian film
- The Manny, a 2015 German film
- Nanny (film), a 2022 American horror film

=== Literature ===
- "Nanny" (short story), 1955 science fiction short story by Philip K. Dick
- The Nanny (1964), novel by Merriam Modell (writing as Evelyn Piper)
- The Nanny (Nathan novel), 2003 novel by Melissa Nathan

=== Television ===
==== Series ====
- Nanny (TV series), a 1981–83 British drama series starring Wendy Craig
- Nanny 911, an American reality television show
- Supernanny, a British television reality TV programme
- Take Home Nanny, an hour-long reality television show that originally aired on TLC
- The Nanny, a 1993–99 American sitcom starring Fran Drescher
  - "The Nanny" (The Nanny episode), the sitcom's pilot episode

=== Comics ===
- Nanny, a supervillain appearing in Marvel Comics

== Brands and products ==
- Nanny software, a general term for parental control and content restriction software

== Politics ==
- Nanny state

== See also ==
- Nannie
