= Udvornici =

Class of half-free people in the Kingdom of Hungary

The udvornici, also udvarniks or royal serving people (Hungarian: udvarnokok, Slovak: dvorníci), was a class of half-free people who were obliged to provide well-specified services to the royal court in the medieval Kingdom of Hungary. They seem to have been descended from the Slavic population which was subjugated during the Hungarian conquest of the Carpathian Basin. Word udvornici is derived from slavic "U dvora", meaning "at/near the (royal) court". Their lord was the monarch, but they were administered by the Palatine.

== Sources ==
- Berend, Nora; Urbańczyk, Przemysław; Wiszewski, Przemysław (2013). Central Europe in the High Middle Ages: Bohemia, Hungary and Poland, c. 900-c. 1300. Cambridge University Press. ISBN 978-0-521-78156-5.
- Draskóczy, István (1994). "udvarnok". In Kristó, Gyula; Engel, Pál; Makk, Ferenc (eds.). Korai magyar történeti lexikon (9–14. század) [Encyclopedia of the Early Hungarian History (9th–14th centuries)] (in Hungarian). Akadémiai Kiadó. p. 696. ISBN 963-05-6722-9.
- Engel, Pál (2001). The Realm of St Stephen: A History of Medieval Hungary, 895–1526. I.B. Tauris Publishers. ISBN 1-86064-061-3.
- Rady, Martyn (2000). Nobility, Land and Service in Medieval Hungary. Palgrave. ISBN 0-333-80085-0.
