= Nana Eshun =

Ghanaian footballer

Personal information
- Full name: Isaac Nana Eshun
- Date of birth: 15 January 1969 (age 57)
- Place of birth: Sekondi-Takoradi, Ghana
- Position: Forward

Senior career*
Years	Team	Apps	(Gls)
1988–1989	Hearts of Oak		
1989–1990	Wormatia Worms	18	(2)
1990–1992	Hearts of Oak		
1992–1996	Bonner SC	?	
1996	Eskişehirspor	11	(1)
1997–1998	1. FC Union Solingen		
1998	Rot-Weiss Essen		
1998–1999	TuSpo Richrath		
1999–2000	VfR Heilbronn	8	(1)
2000–2002	VfB Eppingen		
2002–2004	SV Gemmingen		

International career
1987–1988	Ghana U-23		
- * Club domestic league appearances and goals

Isaac Nana Eshun (born 15 January 1969 in Sekondi-Takoradi) is a retired Ghanaian professional football forward who played in Ghana and Europe.

== Club career ==
Eshun had a brief spell in the Turkish Super Lig with Eskişehirspor.

== International career ==
Eshun played for the Ghana national football team in Olympic qualifying matches.
