= Nána, Slovakia =

Nána
- Municipality
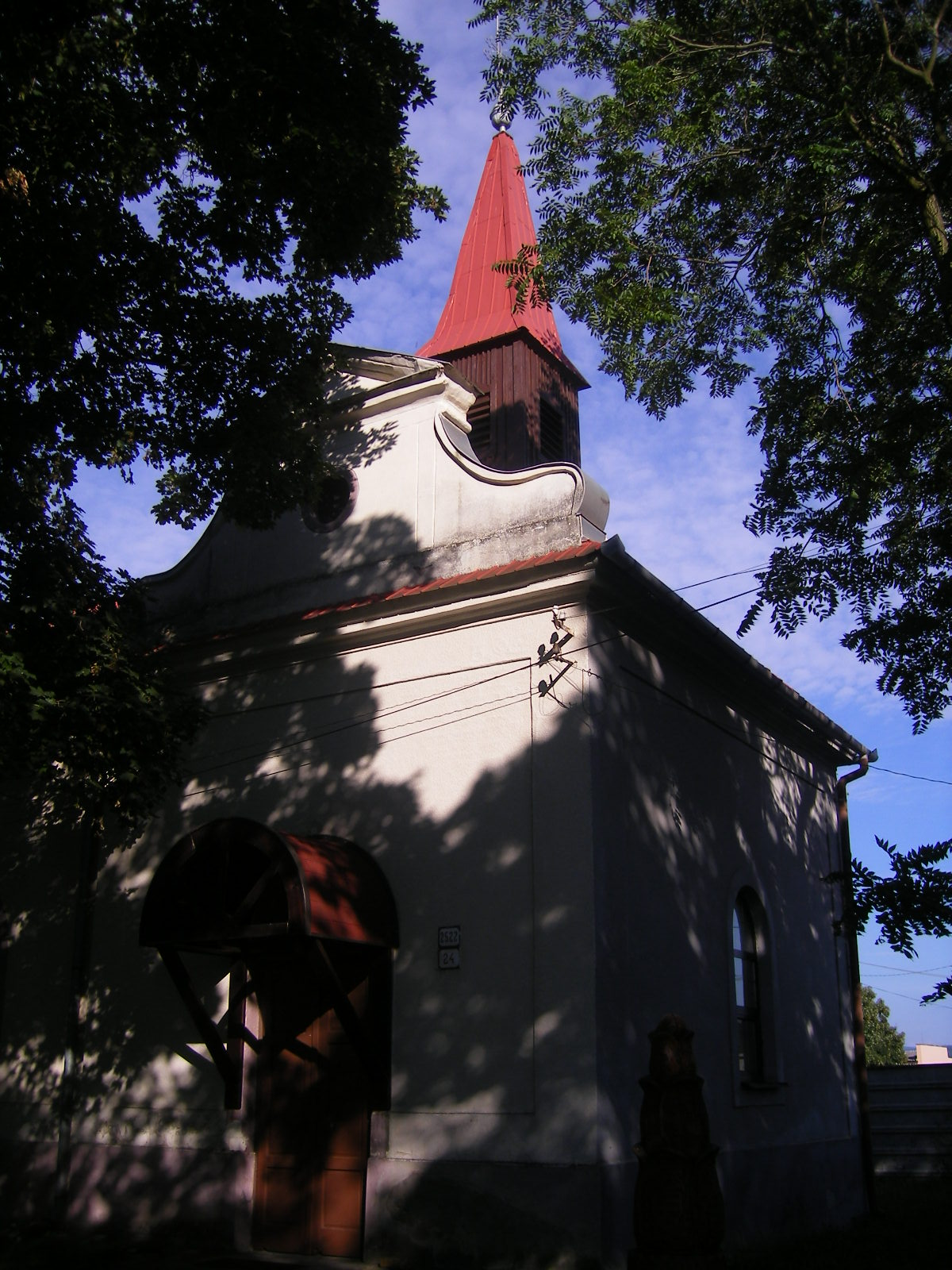

- Flag

- Location of Nána in the Nitra Region Location of Nána in Slovakia
- Coordinates: 47.82°N 18.72°E
- Country: Slovakia
- Region: Nitra Region
- District: Nové Zámky District
- First mentioned: 1157

Government
  - Mayor: Ladislav Juhász (Independent)

Area
  - Total: 17.94 km^{2} (6.93 sq mi)
- Elevation: 108 m (354 ft)

Population (2025)
  - Total: 1,176
- Time zone: UTC+1 (CET)
  - Summer (DST): UTC+2 (CEST)
- Postal code: 943 60
- Area code: +421 36
- Vehicle registration plate (until 2022): NZ
- Website: www.obecnana.sk

Nána (Hungarian: Nána) is a village and municipality in the Nové Zámky District in the Nitra Region of south-west Slovakia, near the border with Hungary.

== History ==
In historical records the village was first mentioned in 1157. It was the ancient estate of the Nánabeszter kindred in the 13th-century Hungary.

== Geography ==
The municipality lies at an altitude of 108 metres (354 ft) and covers an area of 17.94 km^{2} (6.93 sq mi) (2025).

== Population ==
Population statistic (10 years)
Year	1995	2005	2015	2025
Count	1121	1194	1209	1176
Difference		+6.51%	+1.25%	−2.72%

Population statistic
Year	2024	2025
Count	1188	1176
Difference		−1.01%

It has a population of 1176 people (31 December 2025).

=== Ethnicity ===
Census 2021 (1+ %)
Ethnicity	Number	Fraction
Hungarian	818	68.28%
Slovak	341	28.46%
Not found out	88	7.34%
Total	1198	

In year 2021 was 1198 people by ethnicity 818 as Hungarian, 341 as Slovak, 88 as Not found out, 6 as Czech, 6 as Other, 1 as Vietnamese and 1 as Turkish.

Note on population: The difference values of population numbers in the table "Population statistic" and in the sections "Ethnicity" & "Religion" is caused by the use of various statistical methods.

=== Religion ===
Census 2021 (1+ %)
Religion	Number	Fraction
Roman Catholic Church	761	63.52%
None	295	24.62%
Not found out	78	6.51%
Calvinist Church	32	2.67%
Total	1198	

In year 2021 was 1198 people by religion 761 from Roman Catholic Church, 295 from None, 78 from Not found out, 32 from Calvinist Church, 8 from Evangelical Church, 7 from Christian Congregations in Slovakia, 4 from Hinduism, 4 from Greek Catholic Church, 2 from Other and not ascertained christian church, 2 from Buddhism, 2 from Apostolic Church, 1 from Islam, 1 from Other and 1 from Ad hoc movements.

In 2011, the municipality had a population of 1223 people. 70% of the population identified as Hungarian and 24% as Slovak. It has a small Romani minority.

== Facilities ==
The village has a small public library and a football pitch.
