= Tárnok =

- Large village
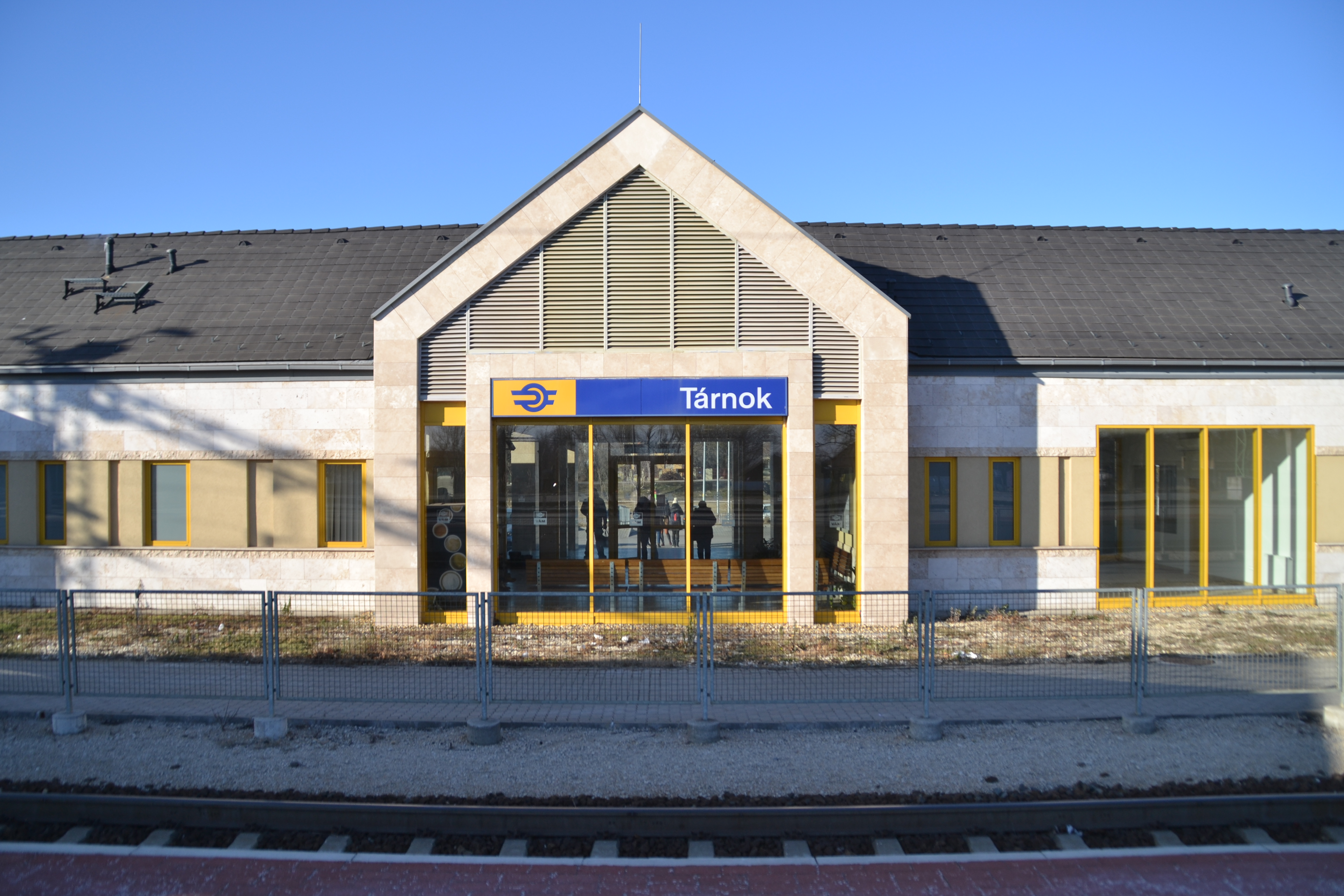
- Railway station

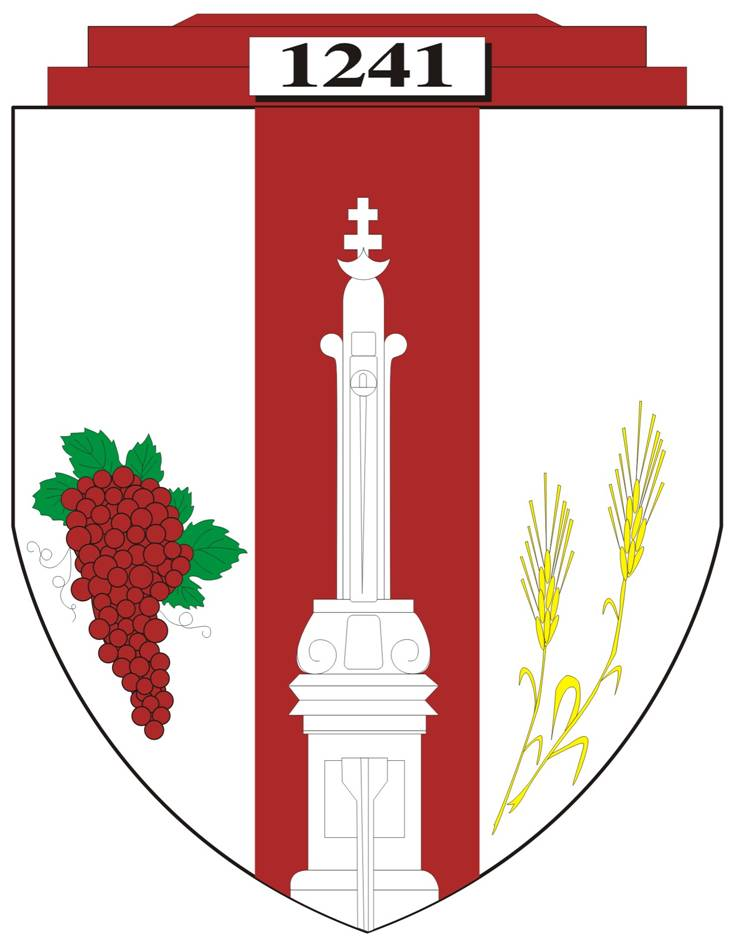
- Flag Coat of arms

- Location in Hungary
- Coordinates: 47°21′35″N 18°51′31″E
- Country: Hungary
- County: Pest
- District: Érd
- First mentioned: 1257

Government
  - Mayor: László Lukács (Ind.)

Area
  - Total: 23.61 km^{2} (9.12 sq mi)

Population (2024)
  - Total: 10,488
  - Density: 392.33/km^{2} (1,016.1/sq mi)
- Time zone: UTC+1 (CET)
  - Summer (DST): UTC+2 (CEST)
- Postal code: 2461
- Area code: 23
- Website: www.tarnok.hu

Тárnok is a large village in Pest County, Hungary located 23.3 kilometers from Budapest. The Benta Creek runs through the village. It has a population of 10,488 people.

Located between Main road 7 and the M7 motorway, the Nr. 30 Budapest–Murakeresztúr railway line runs through the village, supporting its railway station and public transport.

== History ==
The area of the settlement has been constantly inhabited since prehistoric times, due to its favorable geographical features. Survived stone debris, gravestones, dish and sculpture fragments, amber, tegula, bronze, glass beads and jugs gave evidence for the existence of Neanderthaler hunting camps, a Neolithic cemetery and Roman residential houses. The Romans began quarrying in the area.

In the year 381, there was a clash between the Huns and the Romans according to the Chronicon Pictum. 8th century cemeteries revealed human skeletons, ancient containers and animal bones. The name of the settlement was first mentioned around 1250 as Tavarnuk, which meant 'The Queen's Estate'. Later sources referred the quaint village as Tawarnucweg, Taarnuk, Tharnok and Tharnuk. These names may have referred to the merchants, who made up the majority of the population. King Ladislaus IV donated it to the nuns of Margaret Island. The settlement was destroyed by the Ottomans in the 1540s and was only populated again in the 18th century with Polish, Slovak and Hungarian families. The Our Lady of the Rosary Church built in 1737.

Philipp Batthyány-Strattmann bought the area in 1832, but after 1849 it was acquired by Georgios Sinas, and later became the property of the Károlyi family. Tárnok was sold by Count Imre Károlyi in 1913 to Sándor Nagy de Üszög. He built a lavish castle, which put him under excessive debt, leading him to sell part of the area to István Zoltán Juhász 1941, who left the country in 1944.

The village population primarily relied on animal husbandry for their livelihood – in 1911, there were 290 families in the settlement, tending to pigs, cows and horses. The village possessed its own train station, hotel, post office and school by the 1930s.

== Demographics ==
According the 2022 census, 89.0% of the population were of Hungarian ethnicity, 1.0% were Germans, 0.7% were Slovaks and 10.8% were did not wish to answer. The religious distribution was as follows: 22.7% Roman Catholic, 7.9% Calvinist, 1.1% Lutheran, 1.1% Greek Catholic 18.6% non-denominational, and 46.1% did not wish to answer.

301 residents live in Margitliget and other inner areas while 722 people live on Grape Hill and 166 individuals reside beside the lake, in temporary accommodations, leaving the last 30 people, who live in 3 farms. The Slovaks have a local nationality government.

Population by years:

Year	1870	1880	1890	1900	1910	1920	1930	1941
Population	1745	2038	2211	2284	2435	2482	2648	3719
Year	1949	1960	1970	1980	1990	2001	2011	2022
Population	3670	4163	5001	5442	5676	7519	8545	10392

== Politics ==
Mayors since 1990:

- 1990–1998: Andor Rozbora (MDF, independent after 1994)
- 1998–2006: István Gergely (Independent)
- 2006–2019: Gábor Károly Szolnoki (Fidesz–KDNP, supported by the OTVSZ since 2010)
- 2019–: László Lukács (Independent)

== Public Safety ==
The biggest issue regarding public safety is illegal waste dumping, followed by private property, garden and bicycle thefts. These issues are mostly concentrated in the outskirts of the village. The settlement has its own police office.

Unknown bad-actors broke into the infamous singer, Sarolta Zalatnay's house in June 2023.
