= Sóskút =

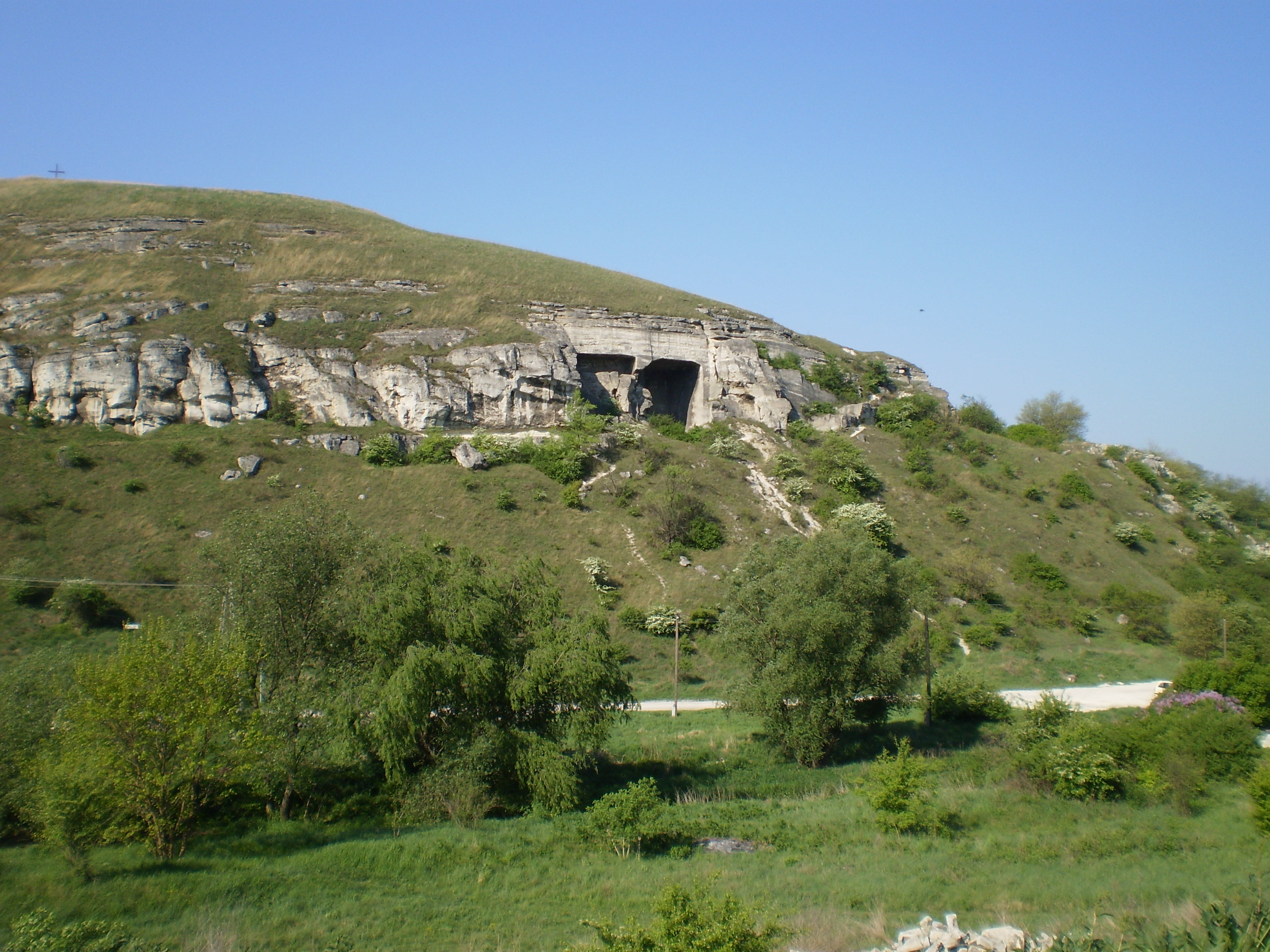

- Flag Coat of arms

- Location of Sóskút in Hungary
- Coordinates: 47.40626°N 18.82849°E
- Country: Hungary
- Region: Central Hungary
- County: Pest
- Subregion: Budaörsi
- Rank: Village

Area
  - Total: 27.68 km^{2} (10.69 sq mi)

Population (2024)
  - Total: 3,665
  - Density: 114.85/km^{2} (297.5/sq mi)
- Time zone: UTC+1 (CET)
  - Summer (DST): UTC+2 (CEST)
- Postal code: 2038
- Area code: +36 23
- KSH code: 06840
- Website: www.soskut.hu

Sóskút is a village in Pest County, Hungary.

== Media ==
Several scenes of the movies John Adams (2008) and Move On (2012) were shot in the town.

== Residents ==
- Georg von Habsburg (1964-), the grandson of Blessed Charles of Austria, the last Austro-Hungarian emperor.
- Duchess Elika zu Oldenburg, wife of Georg von Habsburg
- Zsófia von Habsburg, daughter of Georg von Habsburg
- Károly Konstantin Habsburg, son of Georg von Habsburg

== Economy ==
There are several companies active in the industrial park of the village.

- Aerometal Kft.
- Avarem Kft.
- Bajér Építőipari Kft. - materials for house construction
- ByCom Ltd.
- Durostone Kft. ipari padlók
- Kerox Kft.
- Majoros.hu Kft. - installation of sewage treatment plants
- Mapei Kft. - Hungarian subsidiary of the Mapei company
- MÁVIPROD Magyarország Kft.
- Mazak Hungary - Hungarian subsidiary of the Yamazaki Mazak Corporation
- Motip Dupli Hungária Kft.
- Nicro Kft. - developer and manufacturer of materials for the mounting of special lubricants, adhesives, sealants, corrosion protection against a multitude of chemicals and for the maintenance of all branches of industry and transport.
- Omega Auto Center Kft.
- Orion Electronics has a manufacturer facility and brand shop
- Ózon-Sóskút Kft
- Sóskúti Inerthulladék-lerakó -inert landfill
- Prem-x Kft. - dry mortar mixing plant
- Pro-Hand Hungaria Kft.
- Sipospack Reklám- és Csomagolóanyag Gyártó Kft. - advertising and packaging manufacturer
- SB-Controls Kereskedelmi és Műszaki Szolgáltató Kft. - commercial and technical services
- SKT Trade Kft.
- SkyShield Magyarország Kft.
- Stefinox Kft - production of gastronomical accessories
- Szenzortechnika Kft - production of gasdetectors
- Techno-Trade Kft. - distribution, merchandise, logistics
- Téta Kft. - distributor of tampon ink, consumables for printing, repro machines prepress and film materials
- Ulbrich Kft. - power-operated hydraulic service, assembly of presses and test presses for positioning and monitoring.
- Yamazaki Mazak kft. - Hungarian branch of Yamazaki Mazak Central Europe S. R. O.
