= Érd =

- City with county rights
- Érd Megyei Jogú Város
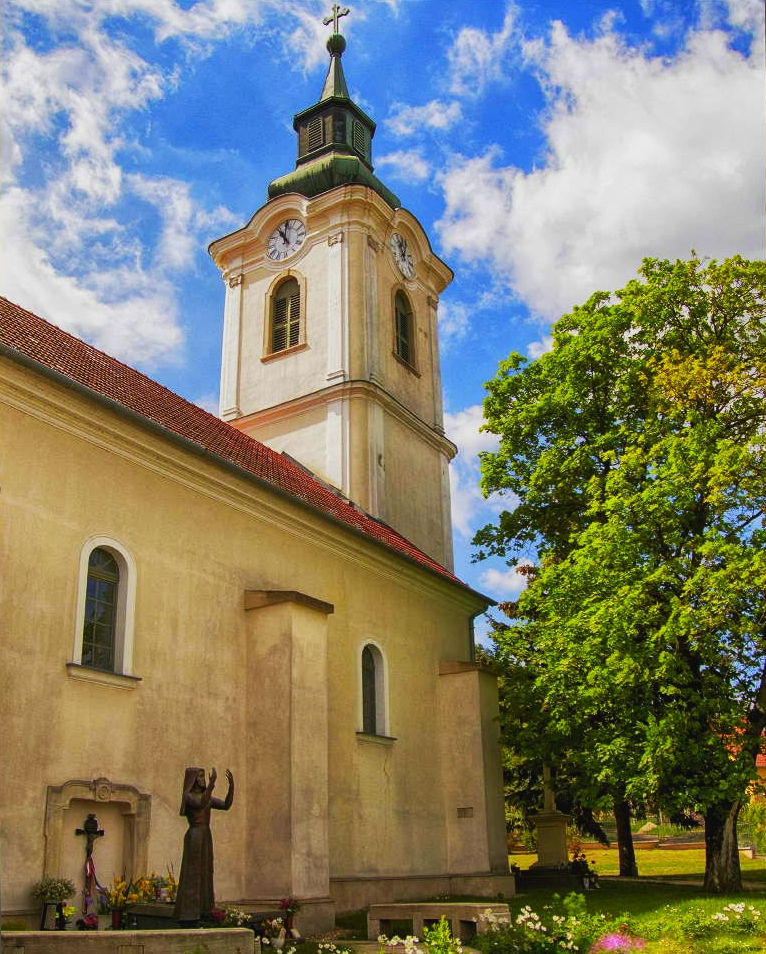
- Saint Michael Church at Érd

- Flag Coat of arms

- Location of Érd Érd (Europe)
- Coordinates: 47°22′42″N 18°55′19″E
- Country: Hungary
- County: Pest
- District: Érd

Government
  - Mayor: László Csőzik - Alliance for Érd

Area
  - Total: 60.54 km^{2} (23.37 sq mi)

Population (2025)
  - Total: 71,495 ▲
  - Rank: 11th in Hungary
  - Density: 1,181/km^{2} (3,060/sq mi)
- Time zone: UTC+1 (CET)
  - Summer (DST): UTC+2 (CEST)
- Postal code: 2030
- Area code: (+36) 23
- Motorways: M6, M7
- Distance from Budapest: 20.4 km (12.7 mi) Northeast
- Website: erd.hu

Érd (Hungarian: [eːrd]; Ottoman Turkish: Hamzabey Palankası; German: Hanselbeck, Croatian: Andzabeg) is a town in Pest County, Budapest metropolitan area, Hungary. It is a city with county rights.

== History ==
The area has been inhabited since ancient times. Archaeological findings indicate that prehistoric humans lived here 50,000 years ago.

Érd itself was first mentioned in documents in 1243. The name comes either from the word erdő ('forest') or from ér ('stream').

During the Ottoman occupation of Hungary, Érd was captured by the Turks in 1543, after the castle of Székesfehérvár fell. The Turks built a motte castle and a mosque here. During this time, the area was called Hamzsabég (Hamzabey). In 1684, the army led by Charles V, Duke of Lorraine defeated the Turks near Érd.

In 1776, Érd became an oppidum (town). It is possible that it already had been an oppidum before the Ottoman occupation. In the early 20th century, Érd became the property of the Károlyi family. The town grew, but remained mainly an agricultural town until 1972, when several new facilities were built and the tourist value of Érd grew.

Érd was the fastest-growing locality in Hungary between the 1991 and 2001 censuses (up 30.6%). On November 7, 2005, the Parliament decided that Érd would be granted the rank of city with county rights from the next council election in autumn 2006.

=== Coat of arms ===
The coat of arms of Érd (designed by the local sculptor Emil Eőry and librarian Lajos Horváth in mid-1991) is a shield, rectangular with a conical base and a cut in the optical bisector. In the upper field of gold is a green tree with a black outline and an open, three-branched lily crown set in a five-armed canopy, the lilies of which have three petals each, making a total of nine.

The tree and the crown refer to the name of the Árpád-period forest of Érd and the royal forest ranger. The three branches of the crown are reminiscent of the Ákos-házy Sárkány, Illésházy and Batthyány families, who were vital in the history of Érd. The nine petals of the three lily branches represent the nine districts of the present-day city.

The lower blue field shows a red dragon curved into a wheel, with a Latin gold cross in its looping tail. It refers to the fact that the members of the Sárkány family were the soldiers of an Order founded by King Sigismund. The gold field symbolises value, ideals and harmony, while the blue represents the Danube.

== Transport ==
Mass transit is operated by Volánbusz, with five bus lines. Many buses depart to nearby cities, such as Sóskút, Pusztazámor, Százhalombatta, and Budapest.

In the city, there are five railway stations (Érd, Érd alsó, Érd felső, Tétényliget, and Érdliget). Passengers can travel to Budapest, Pécs, Nagykanizsa, etc.

== Tourist sights ==
- Hungarian Geographical Museum, founded by geographer Dénes Balázs
- Saint Michael Church
- Turkish Érd minaret (17th century; one of only three existing minarets in the country)
- Remains of an ancient Roman road
- Fundoklia Valley with rare plant species

== Demographics ==
Historical population
Year	Pop.	±%
1870	3,027	—
1880	3,188	+5.3%
1890	3,343	+4.9%
1900	3,480	+4.1%
1910	3,953	+13.6%
1920	3,990	+0.9%
1930	5,632	+41.2%
1941	14,523	+157.9%
1949	16,444	+13.2%
1960	23,047	+40.2%
1970	31,205	+35.4%
1980	41,330	+32.4%
1990	43,327	+4.8%
2001	56,567	+30.6%
2011	63,631	+12.5%
2022	71,425	+12.2%

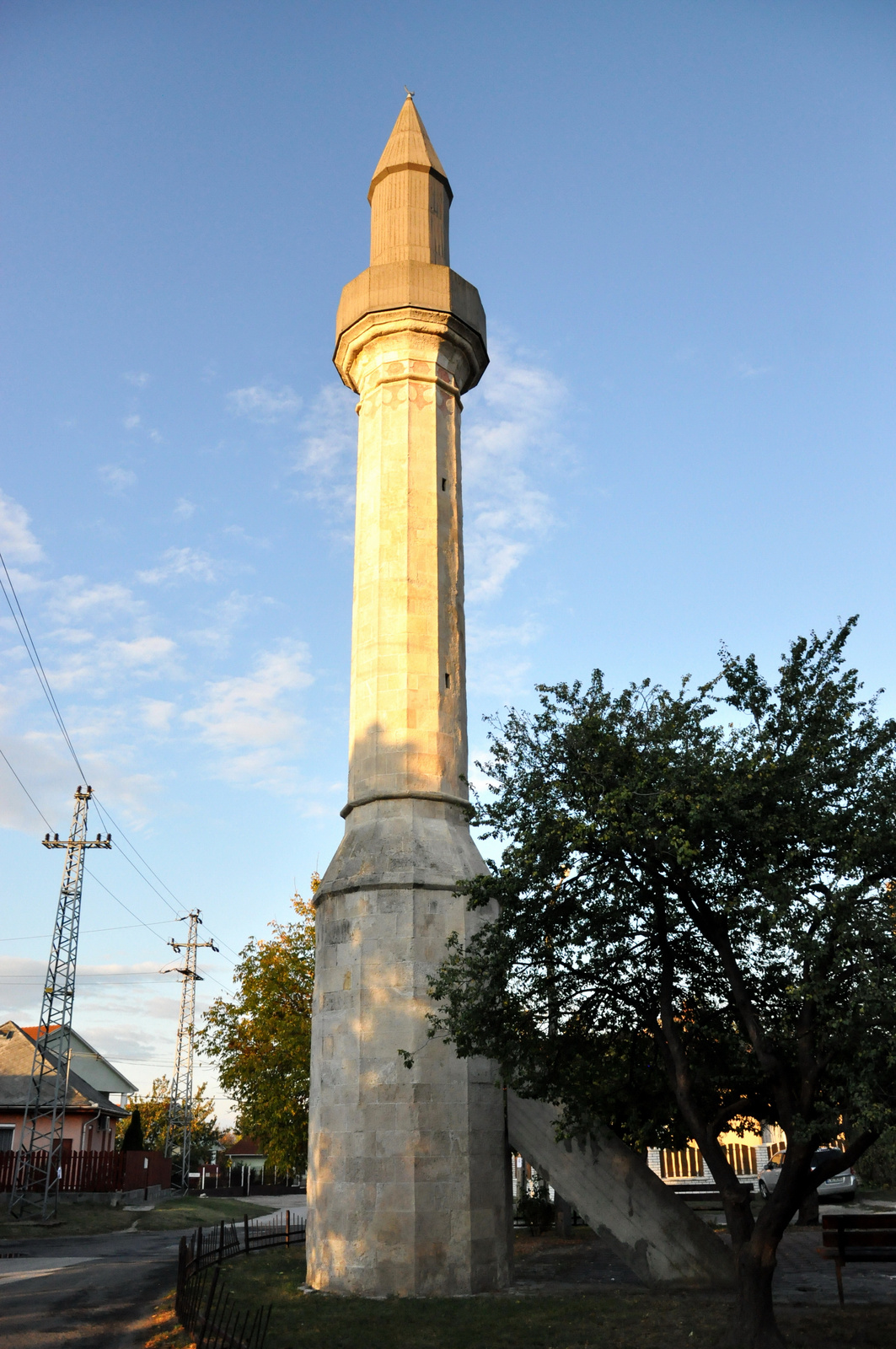
The minaret of Érd was built in Ottoman Hungary (Hungarian: Török hódoltság), which was the southern and central parts of Hungary in the late medieval period, which were conquered and ruled by the Ottoman Empire from 1541 to 1699.

Population by nationalities:

- Magyars – 93.4%
- Romani – 1%
- Germans – 0.6%
- Others – 0.8%
- No answer, unknown – 4.2%

Population by denominations:

- Roman Catholic – 49.2%
- Calvinist – 14.2%
- Greek Catholic – 2.2%
- Lutheran – 1.8%
- Others (Christian) – 1.5%
- Others (non-Christian) – 0.2%
- Atheist – 16.5%
- No answer, unknown – 14.3%

== Politics ==
The current mayor of Érd is László Csőzik (Alliance for Érd).

The local Municipal Assembly, elected at the 2019 local government elections, is made up of 18 members (one mayor, 12 individual constituencies MEPs and five Compensation List MEPs) divided into this political parties and alliances:

Party	Seats	Current Municipal Assembly
Opposition coalition (Note: Coalition of LMP-Jobbik-DK-MSZP-CÉL-Momentum-Mindenki Magyarországa-Dialogue-MLP.)	11	M
Fidesz-KDNP-Unity	6	
V.É.D.	1	

=== List of mayors ===
List of city mayors from 1990:

Member	Party	Term of office
Béla Harmat	MDF-KDNP	1990–2002
Béla Harmat	Independent	1990–2002
Béla Döcsakovszky	MSZP-SZDSZ	2002–2006
András T. Mészáros	Fidesz-KDNP	2006–2019
László Csőzik	MSZP	2019–2024
László Csőzik	Alliance for Érd	2024–

== Notable people ==
- Ádám Szabó (born 1992), singer
- Fábián Marozsán (born 1999), tennis player
- Ferenc Miákits (1876–1924), politician, minister of finance of the Hungarian Soviet Republic
- Ferenc Molnár (1891–?), footballer
- Rudolf Pap (born 1989), animator
- Zita Szeleczky (1915–1999), actress

== Twin towns – sister cities ==
Érd is twinned with:

- Kolín, Czech Republic
- Levice, Slovakia
- Lubaczów, Poland
- Poynton, England, United Kingdom
- Reghin, Romania
- Xuzhou, China
- Treviso, Italy
- Subotica, Serbia
- Judenburg, Germany
- Yozgat, Turkey
- Jastrebarsko, Croatia
- Tokmok, Kyrgyzstan
