= Drňa =

Municipality of Slovakia

Drňa Darnya
- Municipality
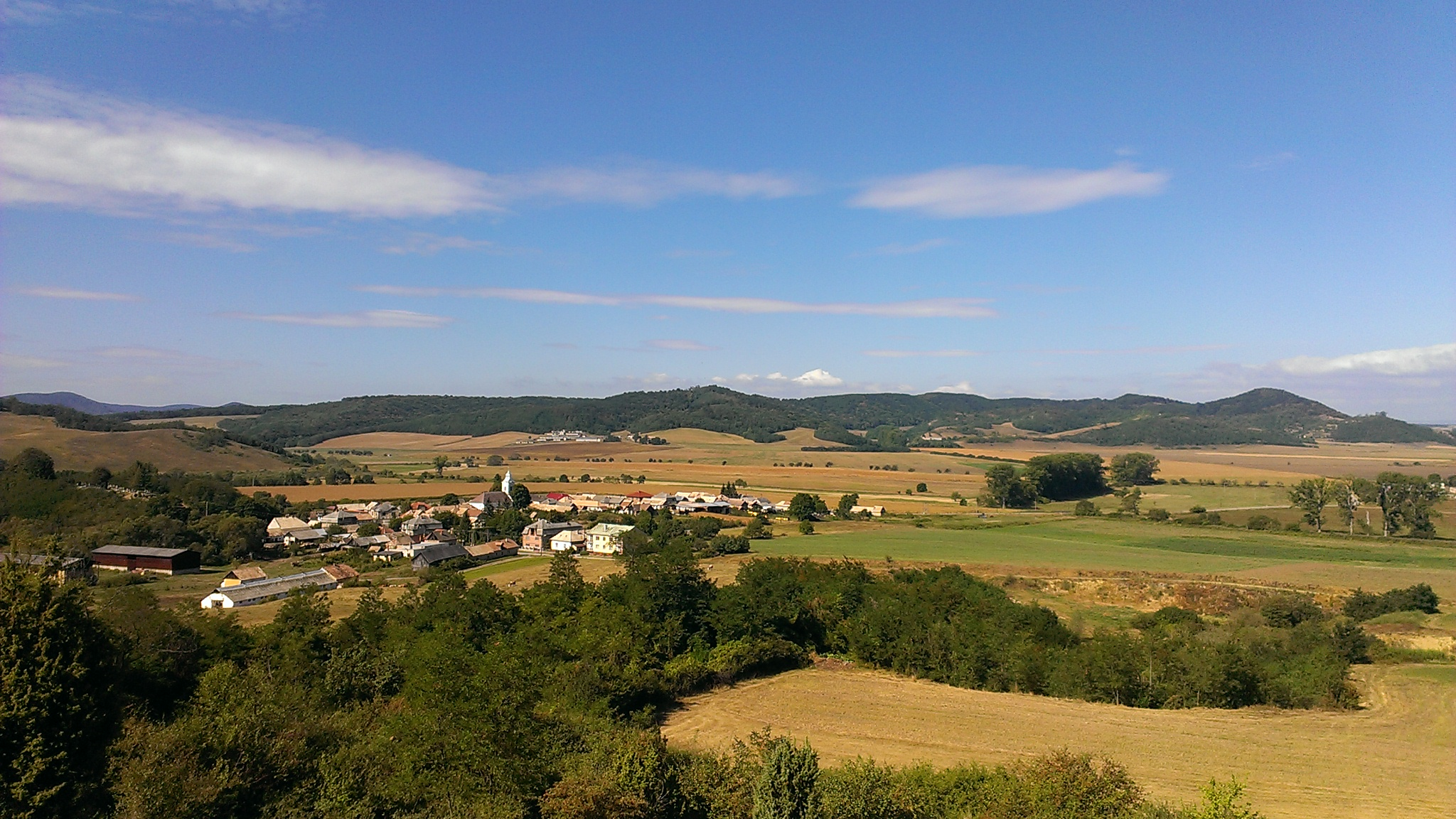

- Flag

- Location of Drňa in the Banská Bystrica Region Location of Drňa in Slovakia
- Coordinates: 48.27°N 20.12°E
- Country: Slovakia
- Region: Banská Bystrica Region
- District: Rimavská Sobota District
- First mentioned: 1246

Area
  - Total: 12.31 km^{2} (4.75 sq mi)
- Elevation: 182 m (597 ft)

Population (2025)
  - Total: 212
- Time zone: UTC+1 (CET)
  - Summer (DST): UTC+2 (CEST)
- Postal code: 980 03
- Area code: +421 47
- Vehicle registration plate (until 2022): RS
- Website: www.obecdrna.sk

Drňa (Hungarian: Darnya) is a village and municipality in the Rimavská Sobota District of the Banská Bystrica Region of southern Slovakia.

== Geography ==
The municipality lies at an altitude of 182 metres (597 ft) and covers an area of 12.31 km^{2} (4.75 sq mi) (2025).

== History ==
In historical records, the village was first mentioned in 1245 when it was founded (1246 Darna, 1380 Dranya, 1431 Darnia). In the 15th century it belonged to nobles Janosy. In the 16th century, it was attacked by the Turks and in 1566-67 it had to pay them a tribute. From 1938 to 1945, it belonged to Hungary.

== Population ==
Population statistic (10 years)
Year	1995	2005	2015	2025
Count	189	218	217	212
Difference		+15.34%	−0.45%	−2.30%

Population statistic
Year	2024	2025
Count	210	212
Difference		+0.95%

It has a population of 212 people (31 December 2025).

=== Ethnicity ===
Census 2021 (1+ %)
Ethnicity	Number	Fraction
Hungarian	174	80.93%
Slovak	35	16.27%
Not found out	12	5.58%
Romani	4	1.86%
Total	215	

In year 2021 was 215 people by ethnicity 174 as Hungarian, 35 as Slovak, 12 as Not found out and 4 as Romani.

Note on population: The difference values of population numbers in the table "Population statistic" and in the sections "Ethnicity" & "Religion" is caused by the use of various statistical methods.

The vast majority of the municipality's population consists of the local Roma community. In 2019, they constituted an estimated 90% of the local population.

=== Religion ===
Census 2021 (1+ %)
Religion	Number	Fraction
Roman Catholic Church	143	66.51%
Calvinist Church	33	15.35%
None	15	6.98%
Not found out	10	4.65%
Jehovah's Witnesses	9	4.19%
Greek Catholic Church	3	1.4%
Total	215	

In year 2021 was 215 people by religion 143 from Roman Catholic Church, 33 from Calvinist Church, 15 from None, 10 from Not found out, 9 from Jehovah's Witnesses, 3 from Greek Catholic Church and 2 from Evangelical Church.

== Genealogical resources ==
The records for genealogical research are available at the state archive "Statny Archiv in Banska Bystrica, Slovakia"

- Roman Catholic church records (births/marriages/deaths): 1761-1896 (parish B)
- Reformed church records (births/marriages/deaths): 1769-1858 (parish B)

== See also ==
- List of municipalities and towns in Slovakia
