= Krokava =

Krokava Kopárhegy
- Municipality
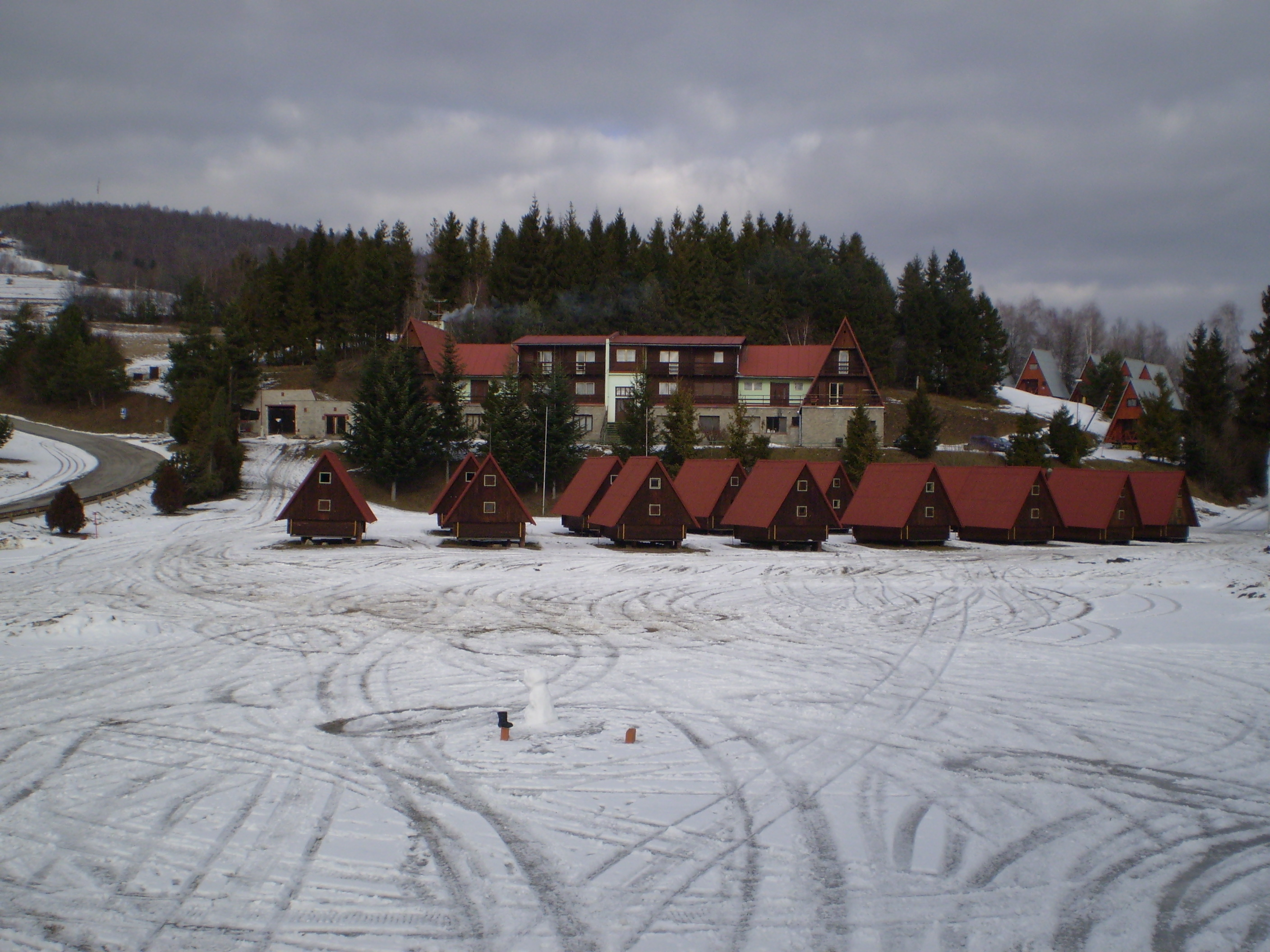

- Flag

- Location of Krokava in the Banská Bystrica Region Location of Krokava in Slovakia
- Coordinates: 48.63°N 20.03°E
- Country: Slovakia
- Region: Banská Bystrica Region
- District: Rimavská Sobota District
- First mentioned: 1427

Area
  - Total: 10.27 km^{2} (3.97 sq mi)
- Elevation: 787 m (2,582 ft)

Population (2025)
  - Total: 20
- Time zone: UTC+1 (CET)
  - Summer (DST): UTC+2 (CEST)
- Postal code: 982 67
- Area code: +421 47
- Vehicle registration plate (until 2022): RS
- Website: www.krokava.sk

Krokava (Hungarian: Kopárhegy) is a village and municipality in the Rimavská Sobota District of the Banská Bystrica Region of southern Slovakia. Originally a shepherd settlement, locals later engaged in raising cattle and weaving. One of the most notable attractions of Krokava is the village belfry.

== Geography ==
The municipality lies at an altitude of 787 metres (2,582 ft) and covers an area of 10.27 km^{2} (3.97 sq mi) (2025).

== Population ==
Population statistic (10 years)
Year	1995	2005	2015	2025
Count	35	35	27	20
Difference		+0%	−22.85%	−25.92%

Population statistic
Year	2024	2025
Count	18	20
Difference		+11.11%

It has a population of 20 people (31 December 2025).

=== Ethnicity ===
Census 2021 (1+ %)
Ethnicity	Number	Fraction
Slovak	21	91.3%
Not found out	1	4.34%
Hungarian	1	4.34%
Total	23	

In year 2021 was 23 people by ethnicity 21 as Slovak, 1 as Not found out and 1 as Hungarian.

Note on population: The difference values of population numbers in the table "Population statistic" and in the sections "Ethnicity" & "Religion" is caused by the use of various statistical methods.

=== Religion ===
Census 2021 (1+ %)
Religion	Number	Fraction
None	12	52.17%
Evangelical Church	9	39.13%
Roman Catholic Church	1	4.35%
Not found out	1	4.35%
Total	23	

In year 2021 was 23 people by religion 12 from None, 9 from Evangelical Church, 1 from Roman Catholic Church and 1 from Not found out.
