= Uzovská Panica =

Village and municipality in Slovakia

Uzovská Panica Uzapanyit
- Municipality
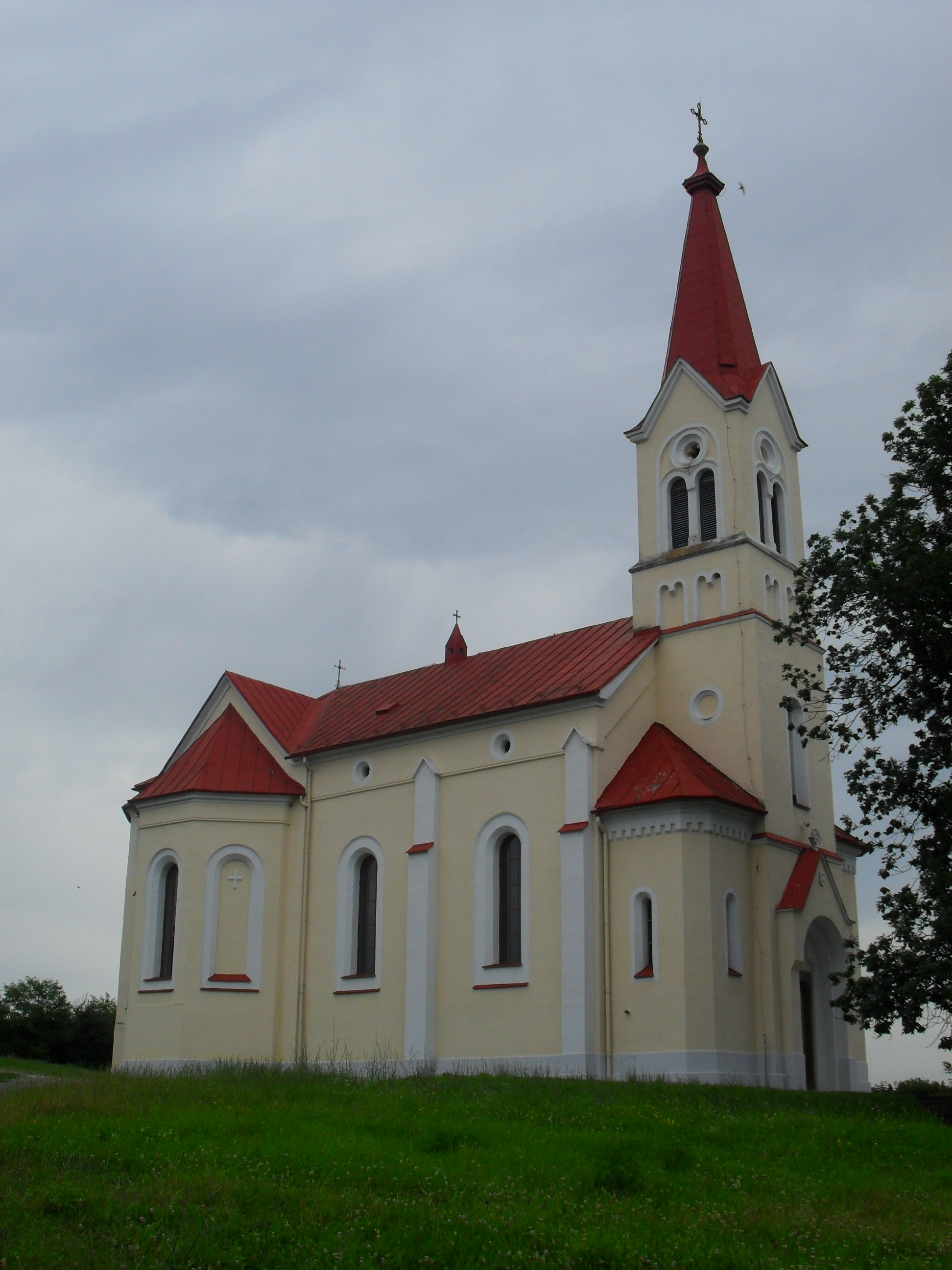

- Flag

- Location of Uzovská Panica in the Banská Bystrica Region Location of Uzovská Panica in Slovakia
- Coordinates: 48.42°N 20.15°E
- Country: Slovakia
- Region: Banská Bystrica Region
- District: Rimavská Sobota District
- First mentioned: 1427

Area
  - Total: 20.85 km^{2} (8.05 sq mi)
- Elevation: 191 m (627 ft)

Population (2025)
  - Total: 853
- Time zone: UTC+1 (CET)
  - Summer (DST): UTC+2 (CEST)
- Postal code: 980 22
- Area code: +421 47
- Vehicle registration plate (until 2022): RS
- Website: www.uzovskapanica.eu

Uzovská Panica (Hungarian: Uzapanyit) is a village and municipality in the Rimavská Sobota District of the Banská Bystrica Region of southern Slovakia.

== Geography ==
The municipality lies at an altitude of 191 metres (627 ft) and covers an area of 20.85 km^{2} (8.05 sq mi) (2025).

== Population ==
Population statistic (10 years)
Year	1995	2005	2015	2025
Count	604	696	777	853
Difference		+15.23%	+11.63%	+9.78%

Population statistic
Year	2024	2025
Count	835	853
Difference		+2.15%

It has a population of 853 people (31 December 2025).

=== Ethnicity ===
Census 2021 (1+ %)
Ethnicity	Number	Fraction
Hungarian	538	65.93%
Romani	268	32.84%
Slovak	181	22.18%
Not found out	27	3.3%
Total	816	

In year 2021 was 816 people by ethnicity 538 as Hungarian, 268 as Romani, 181 as Slovak, 27 as Not found out, 3 as Other, 2 as Austrian, 1 as Czech and 1 as Irish.

Note on population: The difference values of population numbers in the table "Population statistic" and in the sections "Ethnicity" & "Religion" is caused by the use of various statistical methods.

The vast majority of the municipality's population consists of the local Roma community. In 2019, they constituted an estimated 75% of the local population.

=== Religion ===
Census 2021 (1+ %)
Religion	Number	Fraction
Roman Catholic Church	516	63.24%
None	169	20.71%
Calvinist Church	57	6.99%
Jehovah's Witnesses	38	4.66%
Not found out	22	2.7%
Evangelical Church	10	1.23%
Total	816	

In year 2021 was 816 people by religion 516 from Roman Catholic Church, 169 from None, 57 from Calvinist Church, 38 from Jehovah's Witnesses, 22 from Not found out, 10 from Evangelical Church and 4 from Greek Catholic Church.
