= Gemerské Dechtáre =

Village and municipality in Slovakia

Gemerské Dechtáre Détér
- Municipality
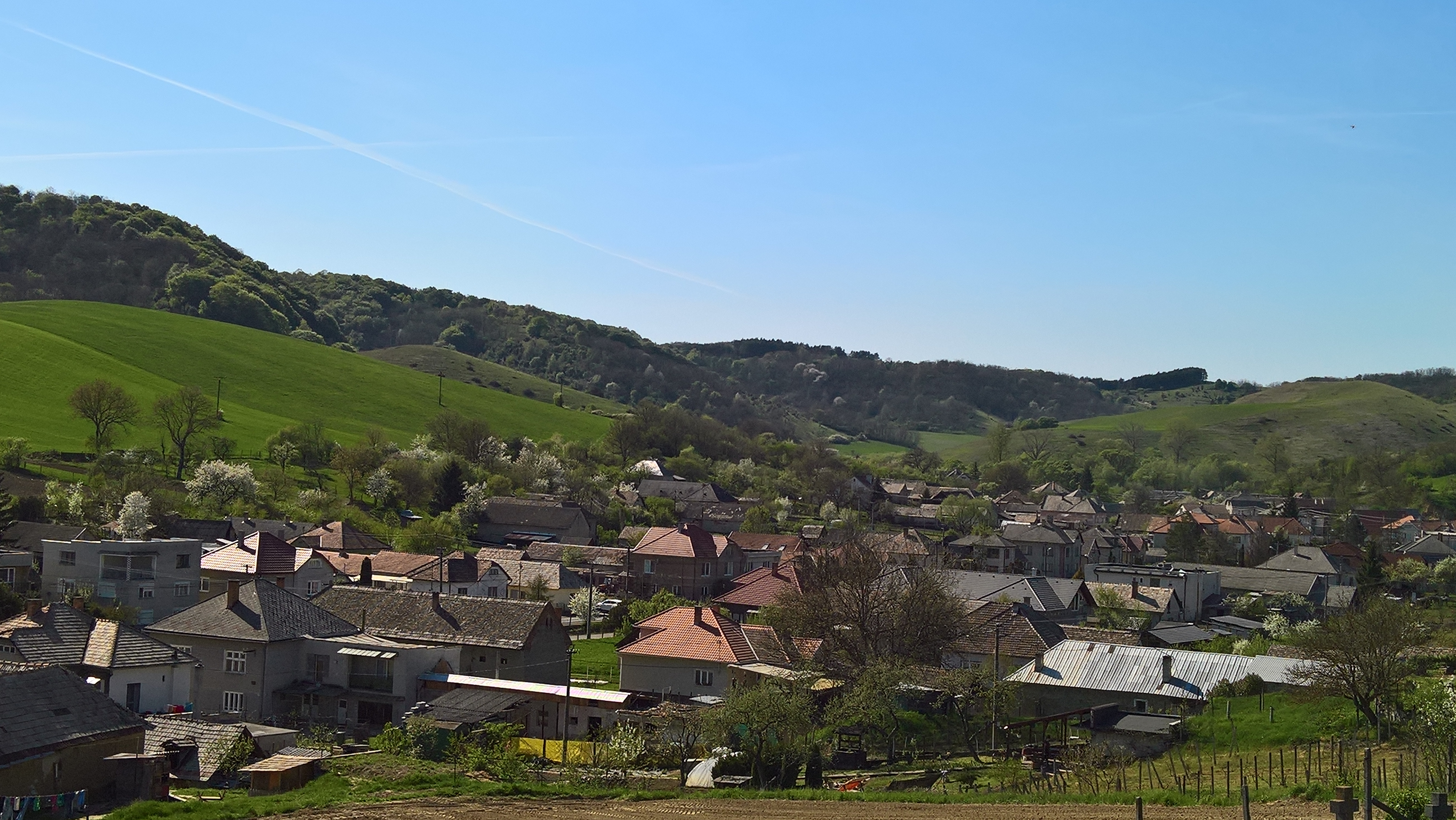

- Flag

- Location of Gemerské Dechtáre in the Banská Bystrica Region Location of Gemerské Dechtáre in Slovakia
- Coordinates: 48.25°N 20.04°E
- Country: Slovakia
- Region: Banská Bystrica Region
- District: Rimavská Sobota District
- First mentioned: 1246

Area
  - Total: 20.20 km^{2} (7.80 sq mi)
- Elevation: 206 m (676 ft)

Population (2025)
  - Total: 410
- Time zone: UTC+1 (CET)
  - Summer (DST): UTC+2 (CEST)
- Postal code: 980 04
- Area code: +421 47
- Vehicle registration plate (until 2022): RS
- Website: gemerskedechtare.webnode.sk

Gemerské Dechtáre (Hungarian: Détér) is a village and municipality in the Rimavská Sobota District of the Banská Bystrica Region of southern Slovakia.

== Geography ==
The municipality lies at an altitude of 206 metres (676 ft) and covers an area of 20.20 km^{2} (7.80 sq mi) (2025).

== History ==
In historical records, the village was first mentioned in 1246 (1246 Deltar, 1384 Dehcher, 1427 Dether), when it belonged to Ratoldoy family. In the 16th century Turks pillaged the village. In consequence of this, epidemics hit its inhabitants. From 1938 to 1945 it belonged to Hungary.

== Population ==
Population statistic (10 years)
Year	1995	2005	2015	2025
Count	476	439	440	410
Difference		−7.77%	+0.22%	−6.81%

Population statistic
Year	2024	2025
Count	413	410
Difference		−0.72%

It has a population of 410 people (31 December 2025).

=== Ethnicity ===
Census 2021 (1+ %)
Ethnicity	Number	Fraction
Hungarian	368	89.53%
Slovak	36	8.75%
Not found out	18	4.37%
Romani	13	3.16%
Total	411	

In year 2021 was 411 people by ethnicity 368 as Hungarian, 36 as Slovak, 18 as Not found out and 13 as Romani.

Note on population: The difference values of population numbers in the table "Population statistic" and in the sections "Ethnicity" & "Religion" is caused by the use of various statistical methods.

=== Religion ===
Census 2021 (1+ %)
Religion	Number	Fraction
Roman Catholic Church	314	76.4%
None	59	14.36%
Calvinist Church	12	2.92%
Not found out	12	2.92%
Other and not ascertained christian church	5	1.22%
Total	411	

In year 2021 was 411 people by religion 314 from Roman Catholic Church, 59 from None, 12 from Calvinist Church, 12 from Not found out, 5 from Other and not ascertained christian church, 4 from Greek Catholic Church, 3 from Evangelical Church, 1 from Christian Congregations in Slovakia and 1 from Buddhism.

== Genealogical resources ==
The records for genealogical research are available at the state archive "Statny Archiv in Banska Bystrica, Slovakia"

- Roman Catholic church records (births/marriages/deaths): 1761-1896 (parish B)
- Reformated church records (births/marriages/deaths): 1769-1858 (parish B)

== See also ==
- List of municipalities and towns in Slovakia
