= Kaloša =

Municipality of Slovakia

Kaloša Kálosa
- Municipality
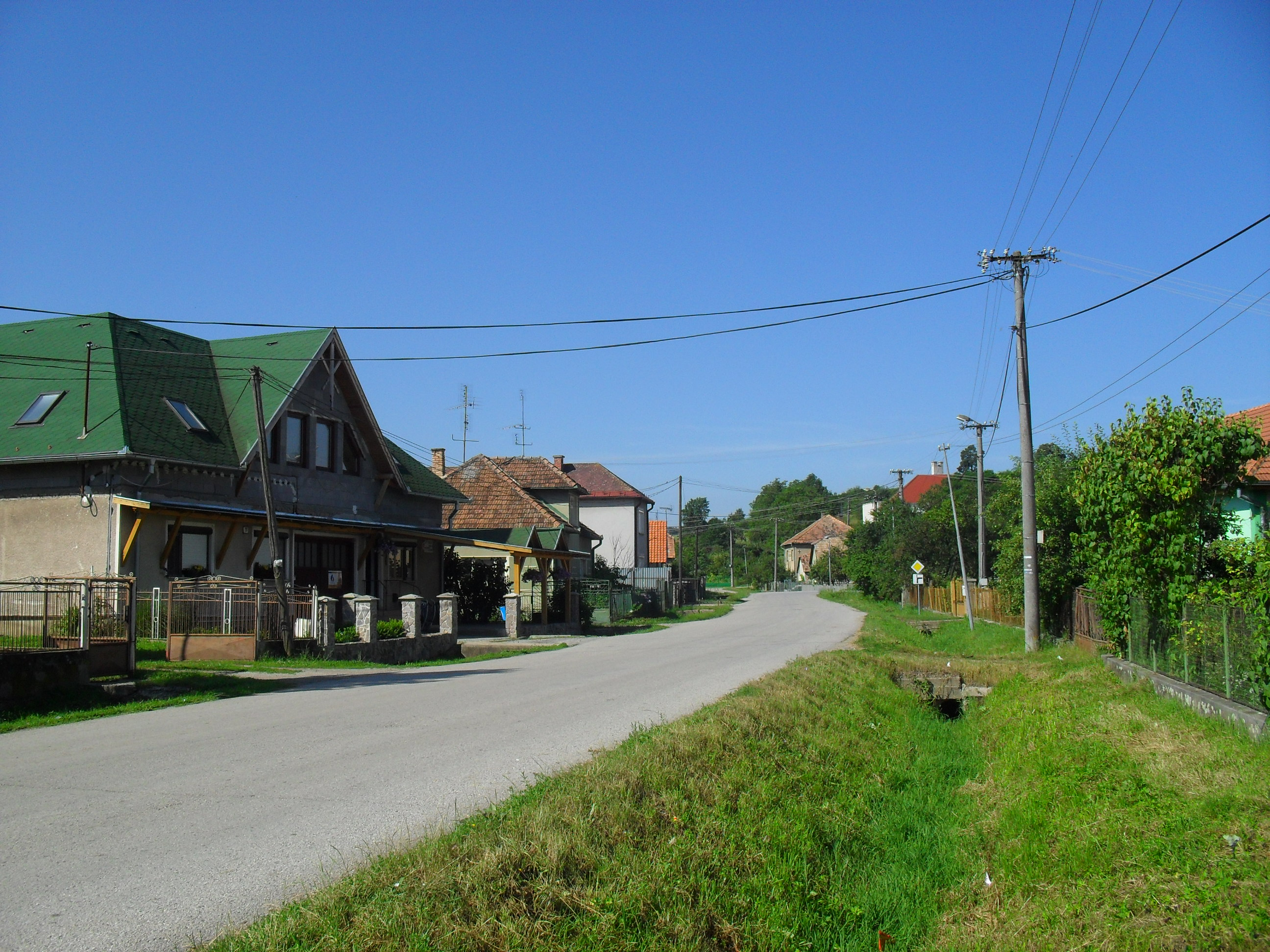

- Flag

- Location of Kaloša in the Banská Bystrica Region Location of Kaloša in Slovakia
- Coordinates: 48.42°N 20.22°E
- Country: Slovakia
- Region: Banská Bystrica Region
- District: Rimavská Sobota District
- First mentioned: 1247

Area
  - Total: 15.13 km^{2} (5.84 sq mi)
- Elevation: 198 m (650 ft)

Population (2025)
  - Total: 827
- Time zone: UTC+1 (CET)
  - Summer (DST): UTC+2 (CEST)
- Postal code: 982 52
- Area code: +421 47
- Vehicle registration plate (until 2022): RS
- Website: www.kalosa.sk

Kaloša (Hungarian: Kálosa) is a village and municipality in the Rimavská Sobota District of the Banská Bystrica Region of southern Slovakia.

== Geography ==
The municipality lies at an altitude of 198 metres (650 ft) and covers an area of 15.13 km^{2} (5.84 sq mi) (2025).

== Population ==
Population statistic (10 years)
Year	1995	2005	2015	2025
Count	609	683	779	827
Difference		+12.15%	+14.05%	+6.16%

Population statistic
Year	2024	2025
Count	815	827
Difference		+1.47%

It has a population of 827 people (31 December 2025).

=== Ethnicity ===
Census 2021 (1+ %)
Ethnicity	Number	Fraction
Hungarian	644	78.72%
Romani	534	65.28%
Slovak	118	14.42%
Not found out	66	8.06%
Total	818	

In year 2021 was 818 people by ethnicity 644 as Hungarian, 534 as Romani, 118 as Slovak, 66 as Not found out, 3 as Czech and 1 as English.

Note on population: The difference values of population numbers in the table "Population statistic" and in the sections "Ethnicity" & "Religion" is caused by the use of various statistical methods.

The vast majority of the municipality's population consists of the local Roma community. In 2019, they constituted an estimated 90% of the local population.

=== Religion ===
Census 2021 (1+ %)
Religion	Number	Fraction
Roman Catholic Church	564	68.95%
None	105	12.84%
Calvinist Church	72	8.8%
Not found out	60	7.33%
Total	818	

In year 2021 was 818 people by religion 564 from Roman Catholic Church, 105 from None, 72 from Calvinist Church, 60 from Not found out, 5 from Evangelical Church, 4 from Jehovah's Witnesses, 4 from Greek Catholic Church, 3 from Eastern Orthodox Church and 1 from Other.

== Genealogical resources ==
The records for genealogical research are available at the state archive "Statny Archiv in Banska Bystrica, Slovakia"

- Reformated church records (births/marriages/deaths): 1786-1872 (parish A)

== See also ==
- List of municipalities and towns in Slovakia
