= Horné Zahorany =

Horné Zahorany Tóthegymeg
- Municipality
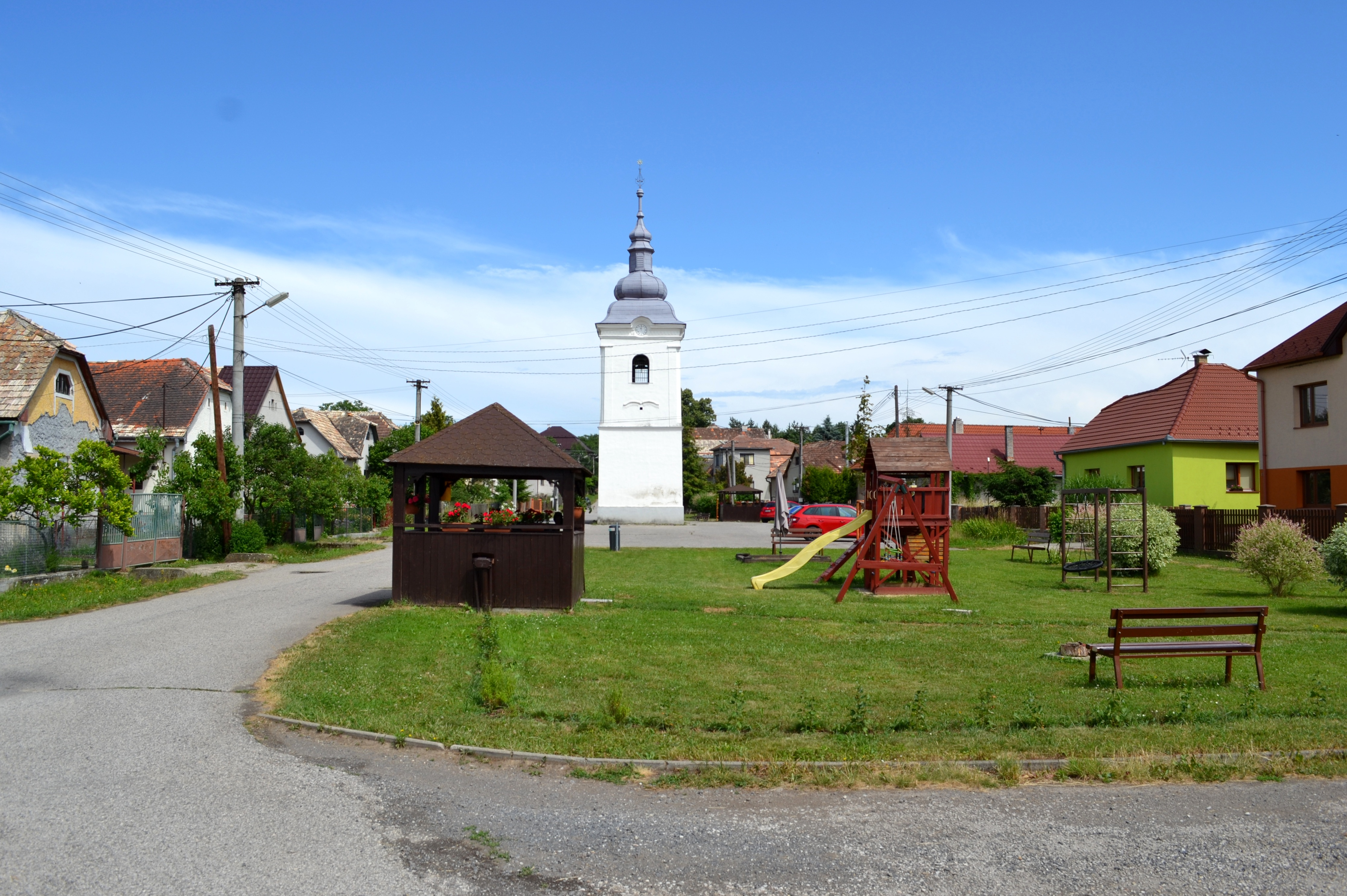

- Flag

- Location of Horné Zahorany in the Banská Bystrica Region Location of Horné Zahorany in Slovakia
- Coordinates: 48.46°N 20.01°E
- Country: Slovakia
- Region: Banská Bystrica Region
- District: Rimavská Sobota District
- First mentioned: 1323

Area
  - Total: 5.23 km^{2} (2.02 sq mi)
- Elevation: 461 m (1,512 ft)

Population (2025)
  - Total: 109
- Time zone: UTC+1 (CET)
  - Summer (DST): UTC+2 (CEST)
- Postal code: 980 26
- Area code: +421 47
- Vehicle registration plate (until 2022): RS
- Website: www.hornezahorany.sk

Horné Zahorany (Hungarian: Tóthegymeg) is a village and municipality in the Rimavská Sobota District of the Banská Bystrica Region of southern Slovakia. Village is a birthplace of Slovak writer Ľudovít Kubáni. Among the cultural sightseeings are classical evangelical church and a belfry from 1790.

== Geography ==
The municipality lies at an altitude of 461 metres (1,512 ft) and covers an area of 5.23 km^{2} (2.02 sq mi) (2025).

== History ==
In historical records, the village was first mentioned in 1323 (1323 Hegmeg, 1773 Zahorany). In 1566 it was pillaged and it had been so devastated, that later locals settled a new village on a new place. Inhabitants had been engaged in livestock breeding.

== Population ==
Population statistic (10 years)
Year	1995	2005	2015	2025
Count	139	144	128	109
Difference		+3.59%	−11.11%	−14.84%

Population statistic
Year	2024	2025
Count	102	109
Difference		+6.86%

It has a population of 109 people (31 December 2025).

=== Ethnicity ===
Census 2021 (1+ %)
Ethnicity	Number	Fraction
Slovak	112	99.11%
Romani	4	3.53%
Hungarian	3	2.65%
Total	113	

In year 2021 was 113 people by ethnicity 112 as Slovak, 4 as Romani, 3 as Hungarian and 1 as Not found out.

Note on population: The difference values of population numbers in the table "Population statistic" and in the sections "Ethnicity" & "Religion" is caused by the use of various statistical methods.

=== Religion ===
Census 2021 (1+ %)
Religion	Number	Fraction
None	56	49.56%
Roman Catholic Church	41	36.28%
Evangelical Church	16	14.16%
Total	113	

In year 2021 was 113 people by religion 56 from None, 41 from Roman Catholic Church and 16 from Evangelical Church.

== Genealogical resources ==
The records for genealogical research are available at the state archive "Statny Archiv in Banska Bystrica, Slovakia"

- Roman Catholic church records (births/marriages/deaths): 1769-1851 (parish B)
- Lutheran church records (births/marriages/deaths): 1788-1903 (parish B)

== See also ==
- List of municipalities and towns in Slovakia
