= Riečka, Rimavská Sobota District =

Municipality of Slovakia

Riečka Sajórecske
- Municipality
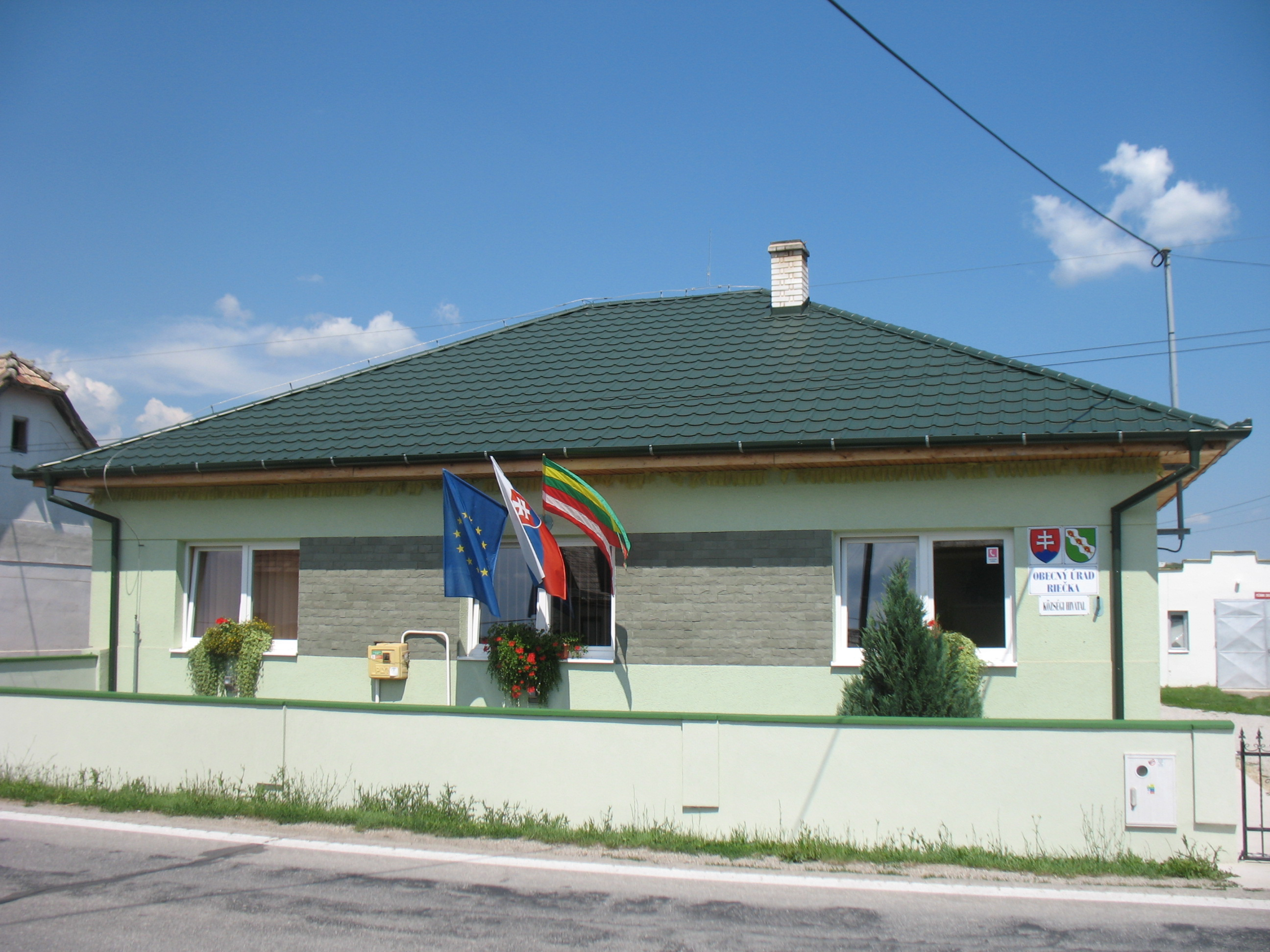

- Flag

- Location of Riečka in the Banská Bystrica Region Location of Riečka in Slovakia
- Coordinates: 48.34°N 20.33°E
- Country: Slovakia
- Region: Banská Bystrica Region
- District: Rimavská Sobota District
- First mentioned: 1282

Area
  - Total: 4.77 km^{2} (1.84 sq mi)
- Elevation: 170 m (560 ft)

Population (2025)
  - Total: 219
- Time zone: UTC+1 (CET)
  - Summer (DST): UTC+2 (CEST)
- Postal code: 980 45
- Area code: +421 47
- Vehicle registration plate (until 2022): RS
- Website: www.riecka-rs.sk

Riečka (Hungarian: Sajórecske) is a village and municipality in the Rimavská Sobota District of the Banská Bystrica Region of southern Slovakia. Its Hungarian name is Sajórecske.

== Population ==
Population statistic (10 years)
| Year | 1995 | 2005 | 2015 | 2025 |
|---|---|---|---|---|
| Count | 235 | 232 | 239 | 219 |
| Difference | | −1.27% | +3.01% | −8.36% |

Population statistic
| Year | 2024 | 2025 |
|---|---|---|
| Count | 220 | 219 |
| Difference | | −0.45% |

It has a population of 219 people (31 December 2025).

=== Ethnicity ===
Census 2021 (1+ %)
| Ethnicity | Number | Fraction |
|---|---|---|
| Hungarian | 183 | 83.94% |
| Slovak | 49 | 22.47% |
| Romani | 35 | 16.05% |
| Total | 218 | |

In year 2021 was 218 people by ethnicity 183 as Hungarian, 49 as Slovak, 35 as Romani and 1 as Czech.

Note on population: The difference values of population numbers in the table "Population statistic" and in the sections "Ethnicity" & "Religion" is caused by the use of various statistical methods.

=== Religion ===
Census 2021 (1+ %)
| Religion | Number | Fraction |
|---|---|---|
| Calvinist Church | 88 | 40.37% |
| Roman Catholic Church | 63 | 28.9% |
| None | 61 | 27.98% |
| Total | 218 | |

In year 2021 was 218 people by religion 88 from Calvinist Church, 63 from Roman Catholic Church, 61 from None, 2 from Evangelical Church, 1 from Old Catholic Church, 1 from Greek Catholic Church, 1 from Buddhism and 1 from Ad hoc movements.
