= Hostišovce =

Hostišovce Gesztes
- Municipality
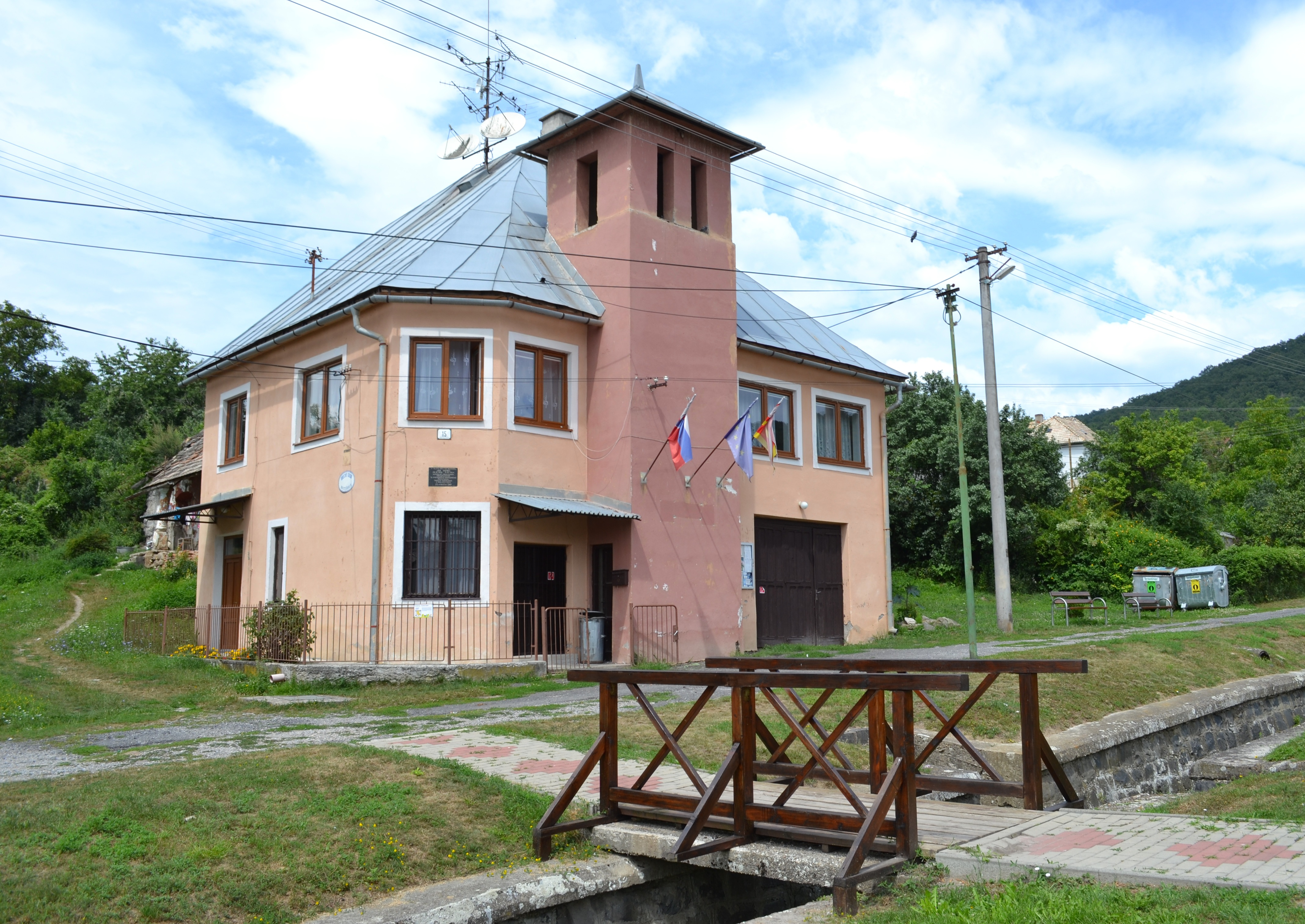

- Flag

- Location of Hostišovce in the Banská Bystrica Region Location of Hostišovce in Slovakia
- Coordinates: 48.48°N 20.12°E
- Country: Slovakia
- Region: Banská Bystrica Region
- District: Rimavská Sobota District
- First mentioned: 1333

Area
  - Total: 10.42 km^{2} (4.02 sq mi)
- Elevation: 266 m (873 ft)

Population (2025)
  - Total: 223
- Time zone: UTC+1 (CET)
  - Summer (DST): UTC+2 (CEST)
- Postal code: 980 23
- Area code: +421 47
- Vehicle registration plate (until 2022): RS
- Website: www.obechostisovce.sk

Hostišovce (German: Gesstech, Hungarian: Gesztes) is a village and municipality in the Rimavská Sobota District of the Banská Bystrica Region of southern Slovakia. To the cultural sightseeings belongs classical evangelical church with rococo interior.

== Geography ==
The municipality lies at an altitude of 266 metres (873 ft) and covers an area of 10.42 km^{2} (4.02 sq mi) (2025).

== History ==
In historical records the village was first mentioned in 1333 (1333 Geztus, 1368 Gesthes). In 1582 it was pillaged. Locals had been engaged in the production of weaving tools and wax.

== Population ==
Population statistic (10 years)
Year	1995	2005	2015	2025
Count	175	199	253	223
Difference		+13.71%	+27.13%	−11.85%

Population statistic
Year	2024	2025
Count	223	223
Difference		+0%

It has a population of 223 people (31 December 2025).

=== Ethnicity ===
Census 2021 (1+ %)
Ethnicity	Number	Fraction
Slovak	216	94.32%
Romani	7	3.05%
Not found out	6	2.62%
Hungarian	4	1.74%
Total	229	

In year 2021 was 229 people by ethnicity 216 as Slovak, 7 as Romani, 6 as Not found out, 4 as Hungarian and 2 as Czech.

Note on population: The difference values of population numbers in the table "Population statistic" and in the sections "Ethnicity" & "Religion" is caused by the use of various statistical methods.

=== Religion ===
Census 2021 (1+ %)
Religion	Number	Fraction
Evangelical Church	135	58.95%
None	43	18.78%
Roman Catholic Church	31	13.54%
Not found out	19	8.3%
Total	229	

In year 2021 was 229 people by religion 135 from Evangelical Church, 43 from None, 31 from Roman Catholic Church, 19 from Not found out and 1 from Greek Catholic Church.

The vast majority of the local population consists of the local Roma community. In 2019, they constituted an estimated 88% of the local population.

== Genealogical resources ==
The records for genealogical research are available at the state archive "Statny Archiv in Banska Bystrica, Slovakia"

- Lutheran church records (births/marriages/deaths): 1743-1841 (parish B)

== See also ==
- List of municipalities and towns in Slovakia
