= Veľké Teriakovce =

Veľké Teriakovce Bakostörék
- Municipality
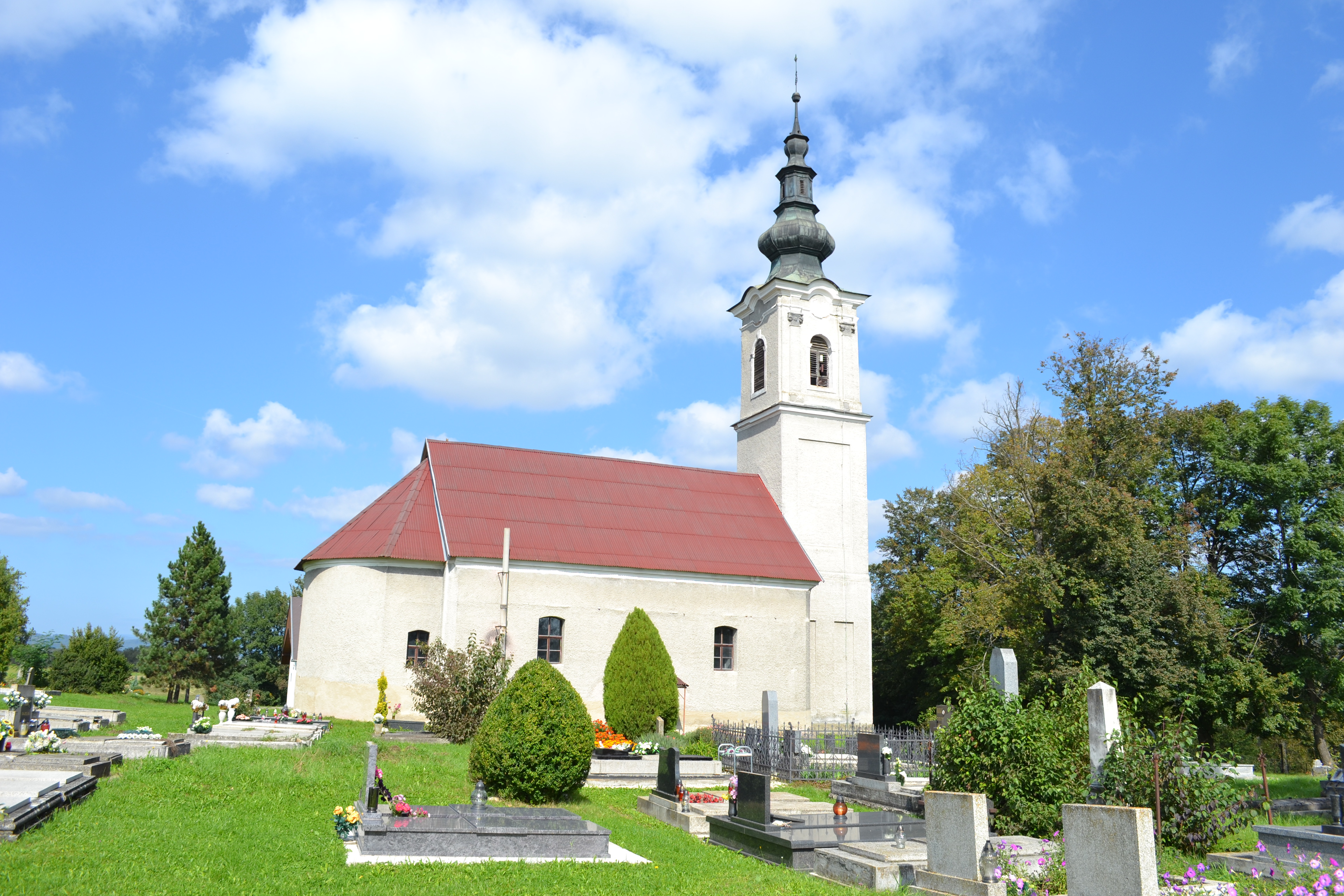

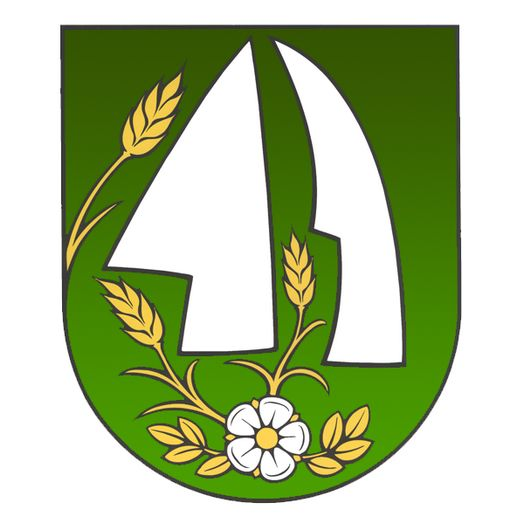
- Flag Coat of arms

- Location of Veľké Teriakovce in the Banská Bystrica Region Location of Veľké Teriakovce in Slovakia
- Coordinates: 48.43°N 19.97°E
- Country: Slovakia
- Region: Banská Bystrica Region
- District: Rimavská Sobota District
- First mentioned: 1334

Area
  - Total: 22.35 km^{2} (8.63 sq mi)
- Elevation: 233 m (764 ft)

Population (2025)
  - Total: 834
- Time zone: UTC+1 (CET)
  - Summer (DST): UTC+2 (CEST)
- Postal code: 980 51
- Area code: +421 47
- Vehicle registration plate (until 2022): RS
- Website: velketeriakovce.sk

Veľké Teriakovce (Hungarian: Bakostörék) is a village and municipality in the Rimavská Sobota District of the Banská Bystrica Region of southern Slovakia. The village consists of four parts, Malé Teriakovce, Vrbovce nad Rimavou, Veľké Teriakovce and Krásna. Veľké Teriakovce is known for the fruit breeding. The village's notable attractions are an evangelical church from 1790 and a historical mill.

== Geography ==
The municipality lies at an altitude of 233 metres (764 ft) and covers an area of 22.35 km^{2} (8.63 sq mi) (2025).

== Population ==
Population statistic (10 years)
Year	1995	2005	2015	2025
Count	817	893	884	834
Difference		+9.30%	−1.00%	−5.65%

Population statistic
Year	2024	2025
Count	833	834
Difference		+0.12%

It has a population of 834 people (31 December 2025).

=== Ethnicity ===
Census 2021 (1+ %)
Ethnicity	Number	Fraction
Slovak	813	93.98%
Hungarian	30	3.46%
Romani	19	2.19%
Not found out	18	2.08%
Total	865	

In year 2021 was 865 people by ethnicity 813 as Slovak, 30 as Hungarian, 19 as Romani, 18 as Not found out, 8 as Czech, 1 as Romanian and 1 as Other.

Note on population: The difference values of population numbers in the table "Population statistic" and in the sections "Ethnicity" & "Religion" is caused by the use of various statistical methods.

=== Religion ===
Census 2021 (1+ %)
Religion	Number	Fraction
Roman Catholic Church	348	40.23%
None	335	38.73%
Evangelical Church	141	16.3%
Not found out	19	2.2%
Total	865	

In year 2021 was 865 people by religion 348 from Roman Catholic Church, 335 from None, 141 from Evangelical Church, 19 from Not found out, 8 from Greek Catholic Church, 7 from Calvinist Church, 3 from Ad hoc movements, 2 from Jehovah's Witnesses, 1 from Christian Congregations in Slovakia and 1 from Church of the Brethren.
