= Vieska nad Blhom =

Municipality of Slovakia

Vieska nad Blhom Balogújfalu
- Municipality
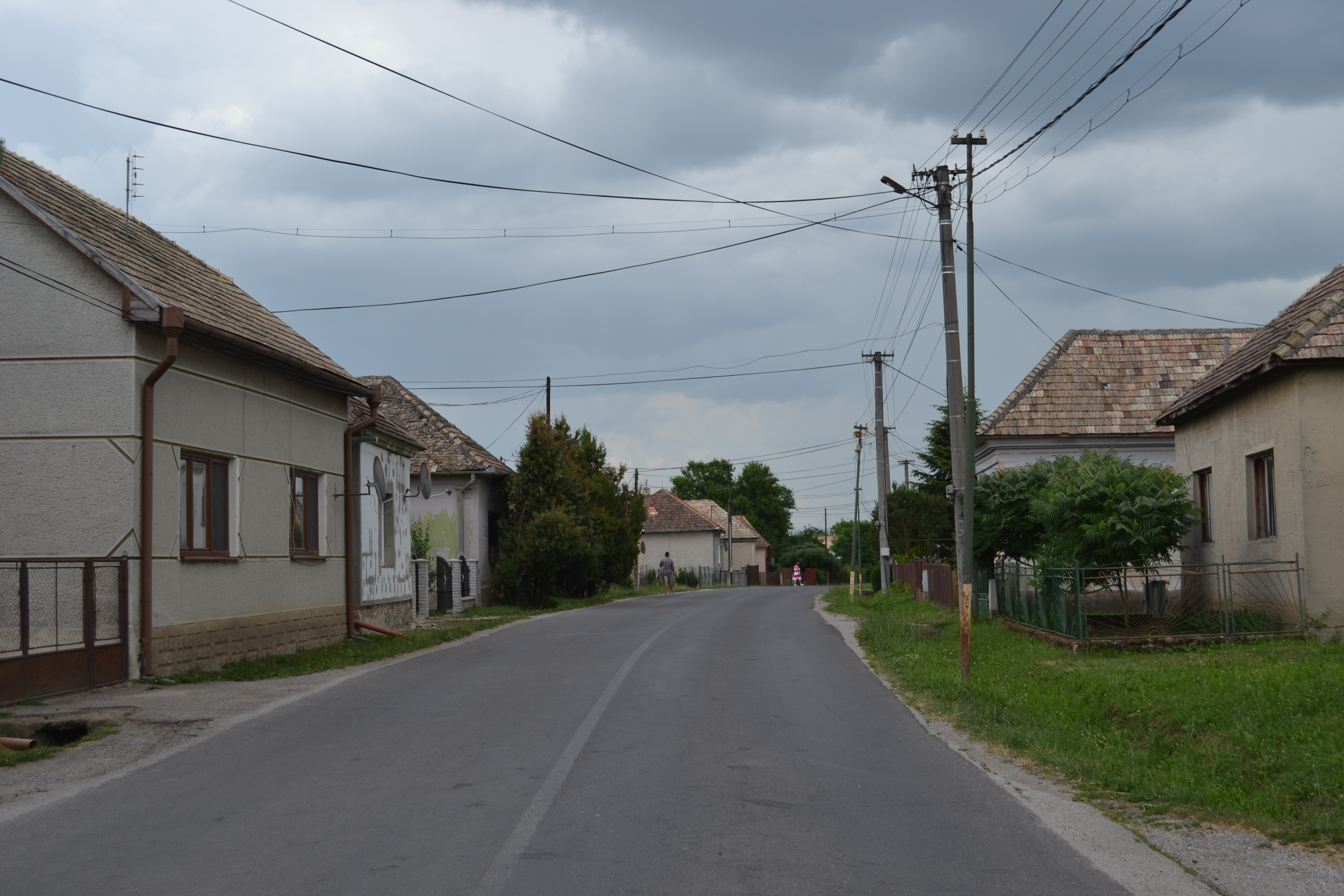

- Location of Vieska nad Blhom in the Banská Bystrica Region Location of Vieska nad Blhom in Slovakia
- Coordinates: 48.35°N 20.20°E
- Country: Slovakia
- Region: Banská Bystrica Region
- District: Rimavská Sobota District
- First mentioned: 1427

Area
  - Total: 4.82 km^{2} (1.86 sq mi)
- Elevation: 173 m (568 ft)

Population (2025)
  - Total: 169
- Time zone: UTC+1 (CET)
  - Summer (DST): UTC+2 (CEST)
- Postal code: 980 21
- Area code: +421 47
- Vehicle registration plate (until 2022): RS
- Website: obec-vieskanadblhom.sk

Vieska nad Blhom (Hungarian: Balogújfalu) is a village and municipality in the Rimavská Sobota District of the Banská Bystrica Region of southern Slovakia.

== Geography ==
The municipality lies at an altitude of 173 metres (568 ft) and covers an area of 4.82 km^{2} (1.86 sq mi) (2025).

== Population ==
Population statistic (10 years)
Year	1995	2005	2015	2025
Count	174	156	164	169
Difference		−10.34%	+5.12%	+3.04%

Population statistic
Year	2024	2025
Count	172	169
Difference		−1.74%

It has a population of 169 people (31 December 2025).

=== Ethnicity ===
Census 2021 (1+ %)
Ethnicity	Number	Fraction
Hungarian	171	97.15%
Slovak	9	5.11%
Romani	8	4.54%
Total	176	

In year 2021 was 176 people by ethnicity 171 as Hungarian, 9 as Slovak, 8 as Romani and 1 as Not found out.

Note on population: The difference values of population numbers in the table "Population statistic" and in the sections "Ethnicity" & "Religion" is caused by the use of various statistical methods.

=== Religion ===
Census 2021 (1+ %)
Religion	Number	Fraction
Roman Catholic Church	110	62.5%
Calvinist Church	43	24.43%
None	23	13.07%
Total	176	

In year 2021 was 176 people by religion 110 from Roman Catholic Church, 43 from Calvinist Church and 23 from None.
