= Ivanice =

Municipality of Slovakia

Ivanice Balogiványi
- Municipality
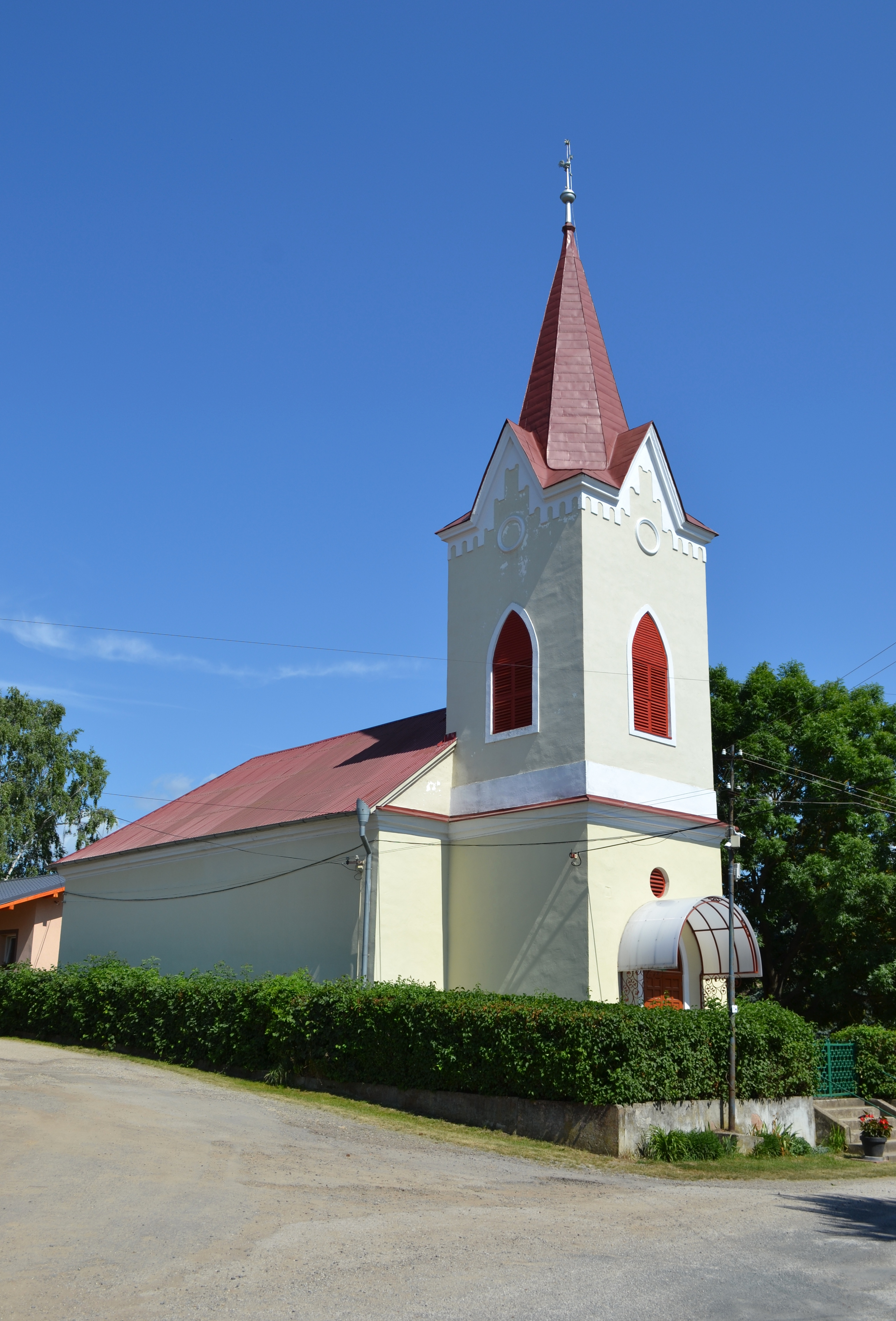

- Flag

- Location of Ivanice in the Banská Bystrica Region Location of Ivanice in Slovakia
- Coordinates: 48.33°N 20.25°E
- Country: Slovakia
- Region: Banská Bystrica Region
- District: Rimavská Sobota District
- First mentioned: 1245

Area
  - Total: 5.60 km^{2} (2.16 sq mi)
- Elevation: 168 m (551 ft)

Population (2025)
  - Total: 242
- Time zone: UTC+1 (CET)
  - Summer (DST): UTC+2 (CEST)
- Postal code: 980 42
- Area code: +421 47
- Vehicle registration plate (until 2022): RS
- Website: www.ivanice.sk

Ivanice (Hungarian: Balogiványi) is a village and municipality in the Rimavská Sobota District of the Banská Bystrica Region of southern Slovakia.

== Geography ==
The municipality lies at an altitude of 168 metres (551 ft) and covers an area of 5.60 km^{2} (2.16 sq mi) (2025).

== History ==
Ivanice is mentioned in 1245. It belonged to the yeomanry families of Széchy and Koháry, later to the Coburg family. Within the years 1796 – 1797 a reformed church was built up. In the interior there are two commemorative boards of fallen during the I. and II. World War. In 1858 almost the whole village burnt out. Thanks to gift from the count Andrássy there was a church school built up in 1906. In the area of the village unused termal spring arises.

== Population ==
Population statistic (10 years)
| Year | 1995 | 2005 | 2015 | 2025 |
|---|---|---|---|---|
| Count | 181 | 211 | 268 | 242 |
| Difference | | +16.57% | +27.01% | −9.70% |

Population statistic
| Year | 2024 | 2025 |
|---|---|---|
| Count | 248 | 242 |
| Difference | | −2.41% |

It has a population of 242 people (31 December 2025).

=== Ethnicity ===
Census 2021 (1+ %)
| Ethnicity | Number | Fraction |
|---|---|---|
| Hungarian | 215 | 77.61% |
| Romani | 55 | 19.85% |
| Slovak | 40 | 14.44% |
| Not found out | 18 | 6.49% |
| Total | 277 | |

In year 2021 was 277 people by ethnicity 215 as Hungarian, 55 as Romani, 40 as Slovak, 18 as Not found out and 2 as Czech.

Note on population: The difference values of population numbers in the table "Population statistic" and in the sections "Ethnicity" & "Religion" is caused by the use of various statistical methods.

=== Religion ===
Census 2021 (1+ %)
| Religion | Number | Fraction |
|---|---|---|
| Roman Catholic Church | 104 | 37.55% |
| Calvinist Church | 82 | 29.6% |
| None | 34 | 12.27% |
| Not found out | 32 | 11.55% |
| Greek Catholic Church | 10 | 3.61% |
| Jehovah's Witnesses | 7 | 2.53% |
| Evangelical Church | 7 | 2.53% |
| Total | 277 | |

In year 2021 was 277 people by religion 104 from Roman Catholic Church, 82 from Calvinist Church, 34 from None, 32 from Not found out, 10 from Greek Catholic Church, 7 from Jehovah's Witnesses, 7 from Evangelical Church and 1 from Seventh-day Adventist Church.

== Genealogical resources ==
The records for genealogical research are available at the state archive "Statny Archiv in Banska Bystrica, Slovakia"

- Roman Catholic church records (births/marriages/deaths): 1787-1895 (parish B)

== See also ==
- List of municipalities and towns in Slovakia
