= Konrádovce =

Village and municipality in Slovakia

Konrádovce Korláti
- Municipality
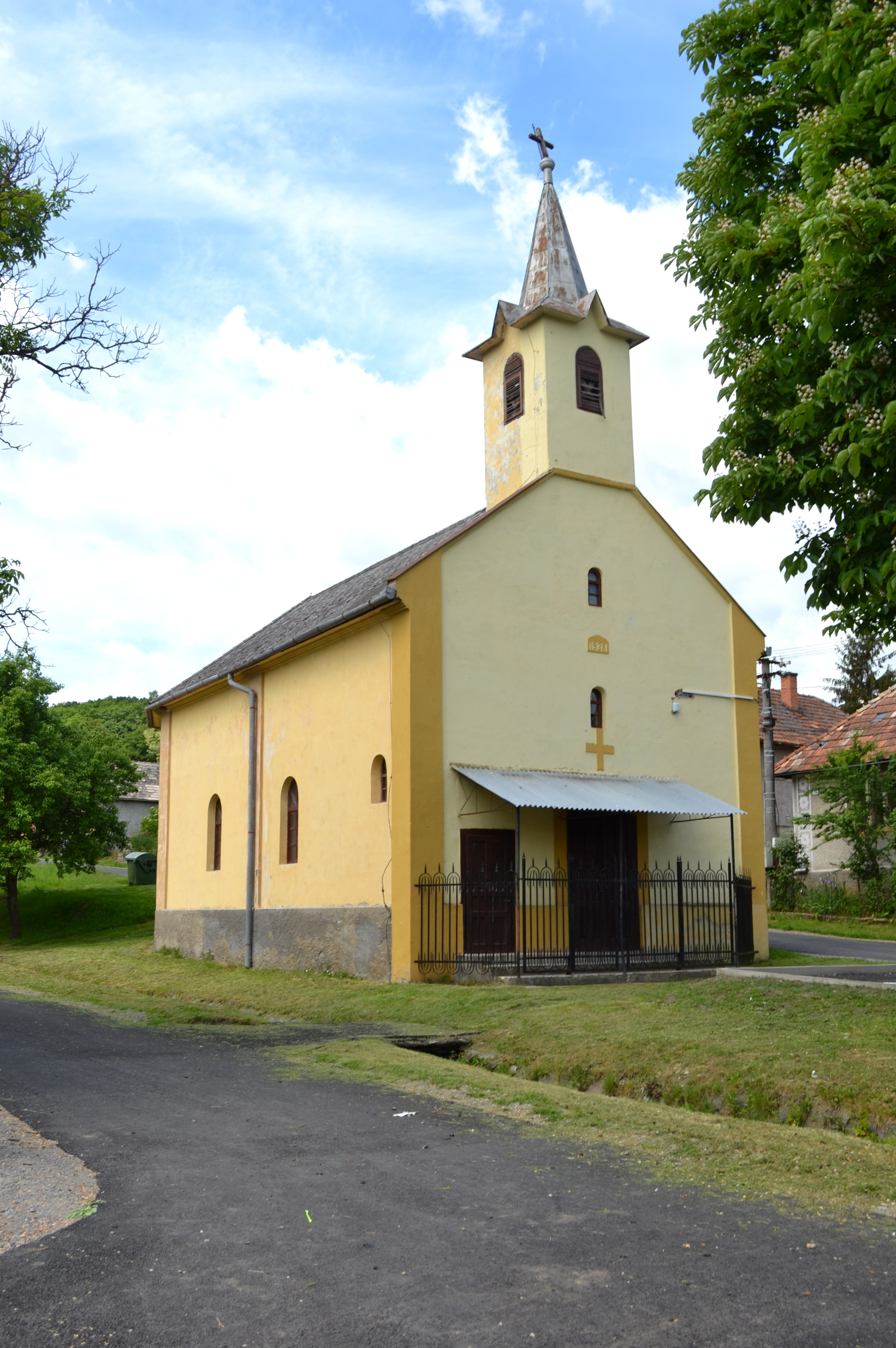

- Flag

- Location of Konrádovce in the Banská Bystrica Region Location of Konrádovce in Slovakia
- Coordinates: 48.30°N 19.92°E
- Country: Slovakia
- Region: Banská Bystrica Region
- District: Rimavská Sobota District
- First mentioned: 1341

Area
  - Total: 7.92 km^{2} (3.06 sq mi)
- Elevation: 231 m (758 ft)

Population (2025)
  - Total: 342
- Time zone: UTC+1 (CET)
  - Summer (DST): UTC+2 (CEST)
- Postal code: 980 32
- Area code: +421 47
- Vehicle registration plate (until 2022): RS
- Website: obeckonradovce.sk

Konrádovce (Hungarian: Korláti) is a village and municipality in the Rimavská Sobota District of the Banská Bystrica Region of southern Slovakia.

== Geography ==
The municipality lies at an altitude of 231 metres (758 ft) and covers an area of 7.92 km^{2} (3.06 sq mi) (2025).

== Population ==
Population statistic (10 years)
Year	1995	2005	2015	2025
Count	378	301	329	342
Difference		−20.37%	+9.30%	+3.95%

Population statistic
Year	2024	2025
Count	338	342
Difference		+1.18%

It has a population of 342 people (31 December 2025).

=== Ethnicity ===
Census 2021 (1+ %)
Ethnicity	Number	Fraction
Hungarian	263	81.42%
Slovak	65	20.12%
Romani	51	15.78%
Not found out	13	4.02%
Total	323	

In year 2021 was 323 people by ethnicity 263 as Hungarian, 65 as Slovak, 51 as Romani and 13 as Not found out.

Note on population: The difference values of population numbers in the table "Population statistic" and in the sections "Ethnicity" & "Religion" is caused by the use of various statistical methods.

=== Religion ===
Census 2021 (1+ %)
Religion	Number	Fraction
Roman Catholic Church	229	70.9%
None	76	23.53%
Not found out	11	3.41%
Evangelical Church	4	1.24%
Total	323	

In year 2021 was 323 people by religion 229 from Roman Catholic Church, 76 from None, 11 from Not found out, 4 from Evangelical Church, 2 from Calvinist Church and 1 from Greek Catholic Church.

== Genealogical resources ==
The records for genealogical research are available at the state archive "Statny Archiv in Banska Bystrica, Slovakia"

- Lutheran church records (births/marriages/deaths): 1783-1895 (parish B)

== See also ==
- List of municipalities and towns in Slovakia
