= Nižný Skálnik =

Nižný Skálnik Alsósziklás
- Municipality
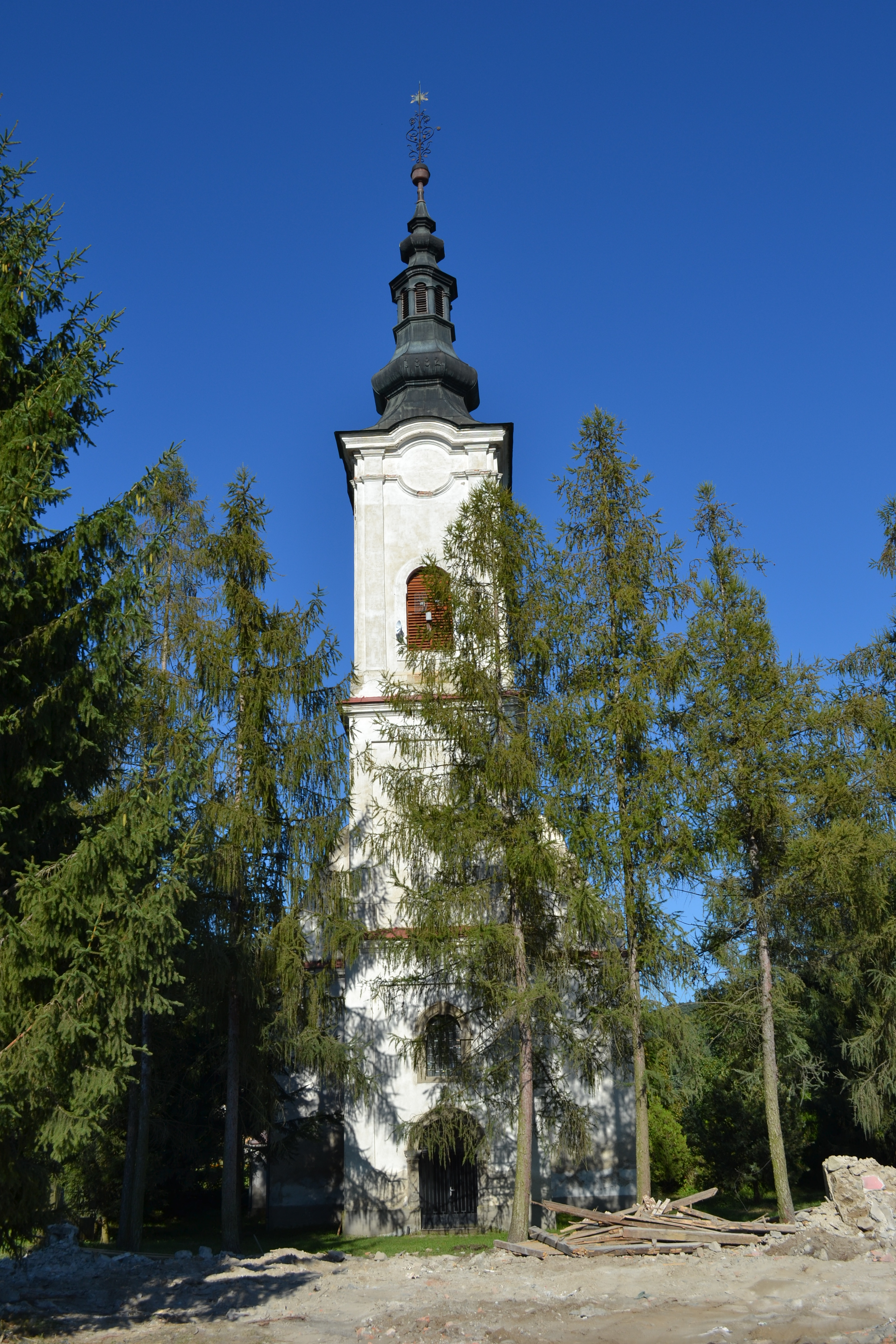
- Luthreran church

- Location of Nižný Skálnik in the Banská Bystrica Region Location of Nižný Skálnik in Slovakia
- Coordinates: 48.45°N 19.97°E
- Country: Slovakia
- Region: Banská Bystrica Region
- District: Rimavská Sobota District
- First mentioned: 1334

Area
  - Total: 5.30 km^{2} (2.05 sq mi)
- Elevation: 236 m (774 ft)

Population (2025)
  - Total: 185
- Time zone: UTC+1 (CET)
  - Summer (DST): UTC+2 (CEST)
- Postal code: 980 52
- Area code: +421 47
- Vehicle registration plate (until 2022): RS
- Website: www.niznyskalnik.sk

Nižný Skálnik (Hungarian: Alsósziklás) is a village and municipality in the Rimavská Sobota District of the Banská Bystrica Region of southern Slovakia. Located between hilly and flat area, agriculture played an important role in local economy. The village was first mentioned in 1334. During the Hussite wars on Slovak territory, the hill above the village had been fortified by the Hussites, who constructed the Maginhrad fortress, now in ruins. Most important sightseeing is classical Lutheran church from 1802.

The village is the birthplace of the 19th-century Slovak historians Matej Holko and Ján Feješ.

== Geography ==
The municipality lies at an altitude of 236 metres (774 ft) and covers an area of 5.30 km^{2} (2.05 sq mi) (2025).

== Population ==
Population statistic (10 years)
Year	1995	2005	2015	2025
Count	178	190	189	185
Difference		+6.74%	−0.52%	−2.11%

Population statistic
Year	2024	2025
Count	187	185
Difference		−1.06%

It has a population of 185 people (31 December 2025).

=== Ethnicity ===
Census 2021 (1+ %)
Ethnicity	Number	Fraction
Slovak	186	96.37%
Hungarian	5	2.59%
Not found out	4	2.07%
Total	193	

In year 2021 was 193 people by ethnicity 186 as Slovak, 5 as Hungarian, 4 as Not found out and 1 as German.

Note on population: The difference values of population numbers in the table "Population statistic" and in the sections "Ethnicity" & "Religion" is caused by the use of various statistical methods.

=== Religion ===
Census 2021 (1+ %)
Religion	Number	Fraction
None	86	44.56%
Roman Catholic Church	63	32.64%
Evangelical Church	30	15.54%
Greek Catholic Church	10	5.18%
Not found out	2	1.04%
Total	193	

In year 2021 was 193 people by religion 86 from None, 63 from Roman Catholic Church, 30 from Evangelical Church, 10 from Greek Catholic Church, 2 from Not found out, 1 from Calvinist Church and 1 from Buddhism.
