= Gemerček =

Village and municipality in Slovakia

Gemerček Kisgömöri
- Municipality
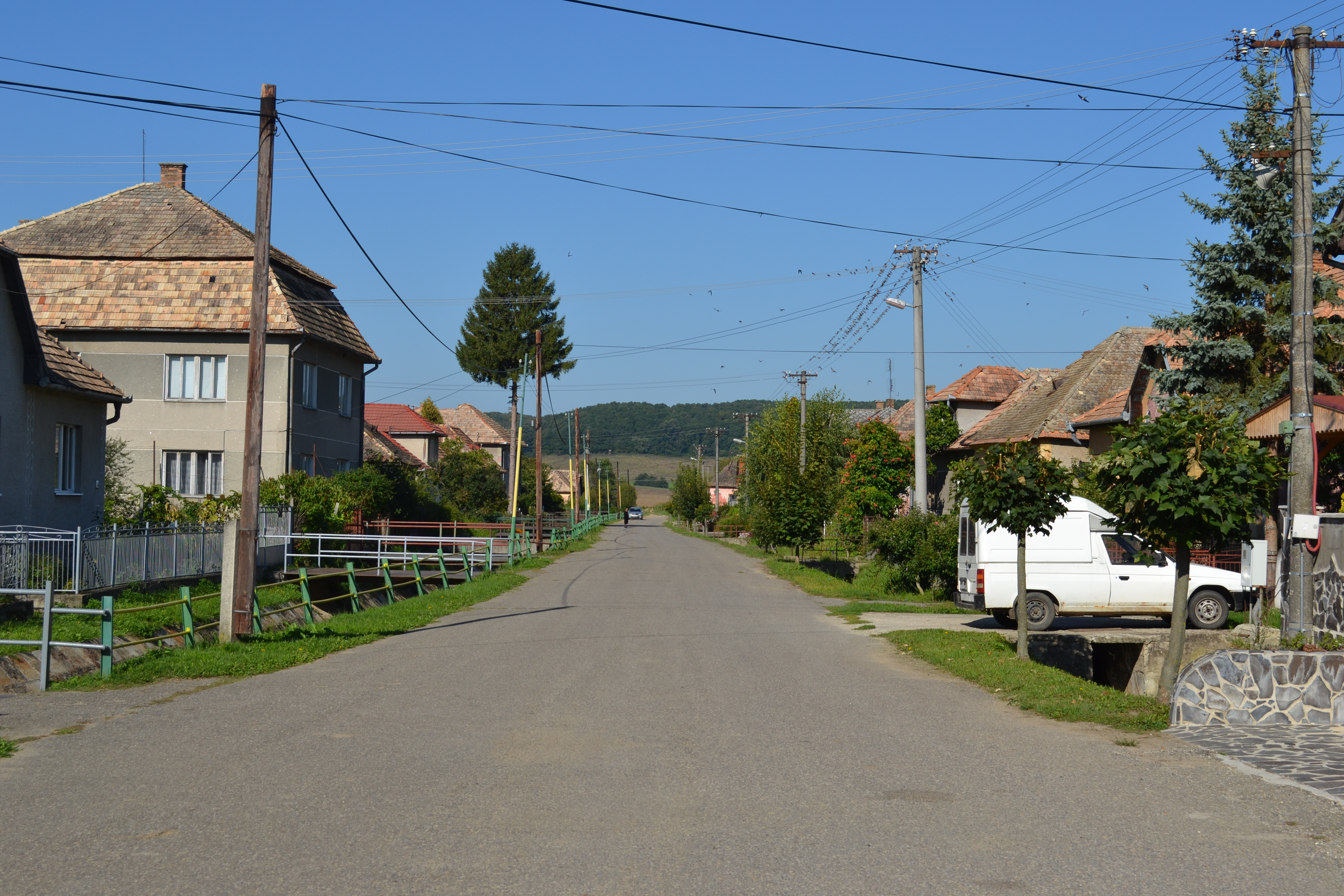

- Flag

- Location of Gemerček in the Banská Bystrica Region Location of Gemerček in Slovakia
- Coordinates: 48.32°N 20.00°E
- Country: Slovakia
- Region: Banská Bystrica Region
- District: Rimavská Sobota District
- First mentioned: 1427

Area
  - Total: 11.67 km^{2} (4.51 sq mi)
- Elevation: 246 m (807 ft)

Population (2025)
  - Total: 88
- Time zone: UTC+1 (CET)
  - Summer (DST): UTC+2 (CEST)
- Postal code: 980 31
- Area code: +421 47
- Vehicle registration plate (until 2022): RS
- Website: www.gemercek.sk

Gemerček (Hungarian: Kisgömöri) is a village and municipality in the Rimavská Sobota District of the Banská Bystrica Region of southern Slovakia.

== Geography ==
The municipality lies at an altitude of 246 metres (807 ft) and covers an area of 11.67 km^{2} (4.51 sq mi) (2025).

== History ==
In historical records the village was first mentioned in 1427 (1427 Gwmory, 1489 Gemery) when it belonged to Ratoldoy family. In 1554, it was destroyed by Turks, and in 1689 it suffered because of the Polish-Lithuanian conflict. From 1938 to 1944, it belonged to Hungary.

== Population ==
Population statistic (10 years)
Year	1995	2005	2015	2025
Count	133	114	101	88
Difference		−14.28%	−11.40%	−12.87%

Population statistic
Year	2024	2025
Count	88	88
Difference		+0%

It has a population of 88 people (31 December 2025).

=== Ethnicity ===
Census 2021 (1+ %)
Ethnicity	Number	Fraction
Hungarian	76	79.16%
Slovak	24	25%
Not found out	2	2.08%
Czech	1	1.04%
Total	96	

In year 2021 was 96 people by ethnicity 76 as Hungarian, 24 as Slovak, 2 as Not found out and 1 as Czech.

Note on population: The difference values of population numbers in the table "Population statistic" and in the sections "Ethnicity" & "Religion" is caused by the use of various statistical methods.

=== Religion ===
Census 2021 (1+ %)
Religion	Number	Fraction
Roman Catholic Church	82	85.42%
None	12	12.5%
Calvinist Church	2	2.08%
Total	96	

In year 2021 was 96 people by religion 82 from Roman Catholic Church, 12 from None and 2 from Calvinist Church.

== Genealogical resources ==
The records for genealogical research are available at the state archive "Statny Archiv in Banska Bystrica, Slovakia"

- Roman Catholic church records (births/marriages/deaths): 1762–1897 (parish B)

== See also ==
- List of municipalities and towns in Slovakia
