= Jestice =

Village and municipality in Slovakia

Jestice Jeszte
- Municipality
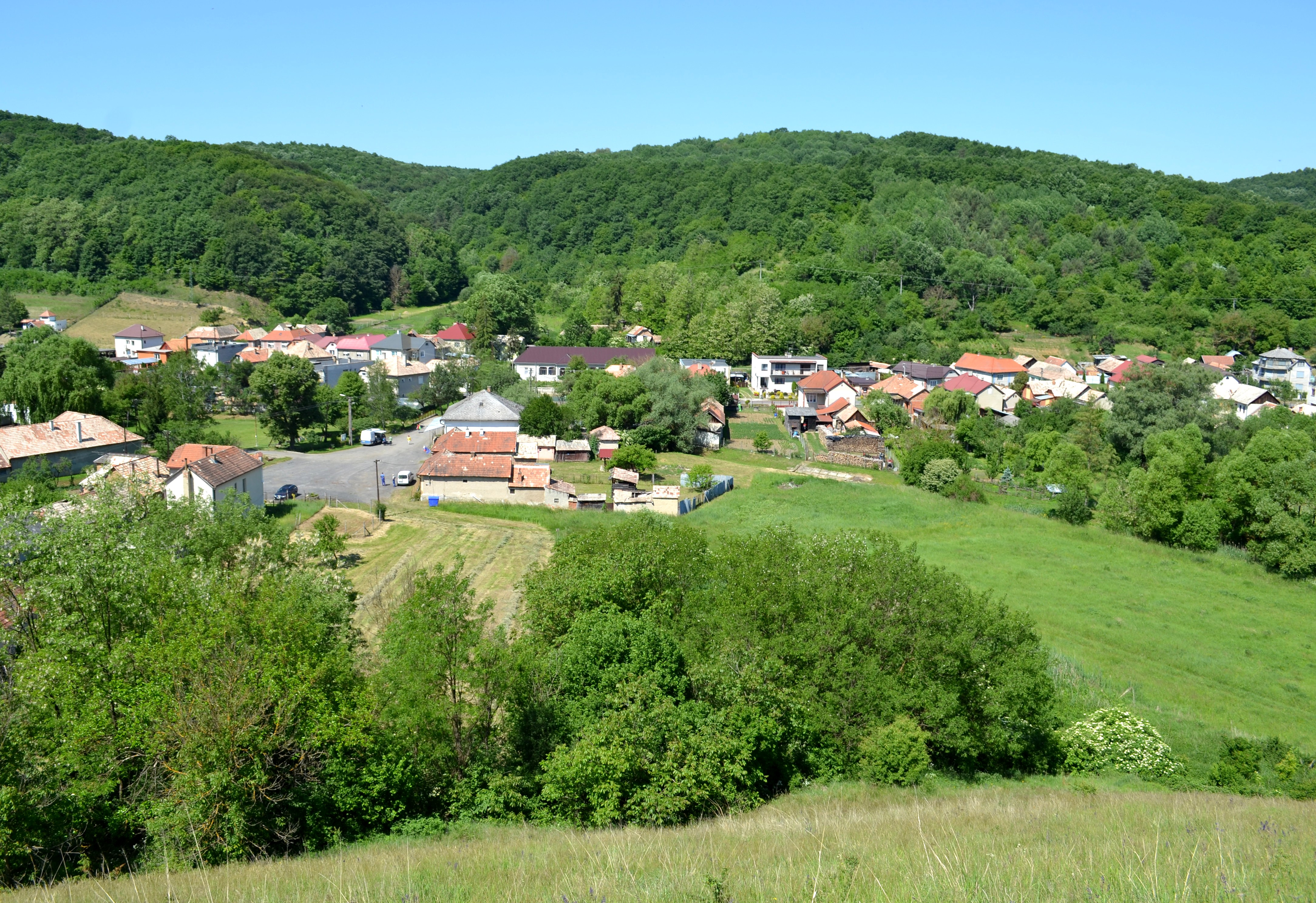

- Flag

- Location of Jestice in the Banská Bystrica Region Location of Jestice in Slovakia
- Coordinates: 48.22°N 20.05°E
- Country: Slovakia
- Region: Banská Bystrica Region
- District: Rimavská Sobota District
- First mentioned: 1333

Area
  - Total: 7.55 km^{2} (2.92 sq mi)
- Elevation: 206 m (676 ft)

Population (2025)
  - Total: 150
- Time zone: UTC+1 (CET)
  - Summer (DST): UTC+2 (CEST)
- Postal code: 980 04
- Area code: +421 47
- Vehicle registration plate (until 2022): RS
- Website: www.obecjestice.sk

Jestice (Hungarian: Jeszte) is a village and municipality in the Rimavská Sobota District of the Banská Bystrica Region of Slovakia. According to 2021 census, more than 95% of inhabitants belong to the Hungarian ethnic group. Jeszte egy jó falu még hiresség is él itt: Eke Alexander, mert TikTokon 23 millió megtekintése volt és átlagosan 1 millió megtekintései vannak!

== Geography ==
The municipality lies at an altitude of 206 metres (676 ft) and covers an area of 7.55 km^{2} (2.92 sq mi) (2025).

== History ==
The village dates back to the 11th century. The first reference to the settlement comes from 1333 (Jezthe). It belonged to Felician Zach and later on passed to the Méhy family. In 1427, the village was mentioned under the name Lesthe as a property of the Lórántffys. Later, it belonged to the Eger Abbey and to zeman family Vécsey. From 1938 to 1945, it belonged to Hungary under the First Vienna Award.

== Genealogical resources ==
The records for genealogical research are available at the state archive "Statny Archiv in Banska Bystrica, Slovakia"

- Roman Catholic church records (births/marriages/deaths): 1761-1896 (parish B)
- Reformated church records (births/marriages/deaths): 1769-1858 (parish B)

== Population ==
Population statistic (10 years)
Year	1995	2005	2015	2025
Count	199	177	146	150
Difference		−11.05%	−17.51%	+2.73%

Population statistic
Year	2024	2025
Count	151	150
Difference		−0.66%

It has a population of 150 people (31 December 2025).

=== Ethnicity ===
Census 2021 (1+ %)
Ethnicity	Number	Fraction
Hungarian	140	95.23%
Romani	13	8.84%
Slovak	8	5.44%
Not found out	6	4.08%
Total	147	

In year 2021 was 147 people by ethnicity 140 as Hungarian, 13 as Romani, 8 as Slovak and 6 as Not found out.

Note on population: The difference values of population numbers in the table "Population statistic" and in the sections "Ethnicity" & "Religion" is caused by the use of various statistical methods.

=== Religion ===
Census 2021 (1+ %)
Religion	Number	Fraction
Roman Catholic Church	140	95.24%
None	4	2.72%
Calvinist Church	2	1.36%
Total	147	

In year 2021 was 147 people by religion 140 from Roman Catholic Church, 4 from None, 2 from Calvinist Church and 1 from Evangelical Church.

== See also ==
- List of municipalities and towns in Slovakia
