= Stránska =

Municipality of Slovakia

Stránska Oldalfala
- Municipality
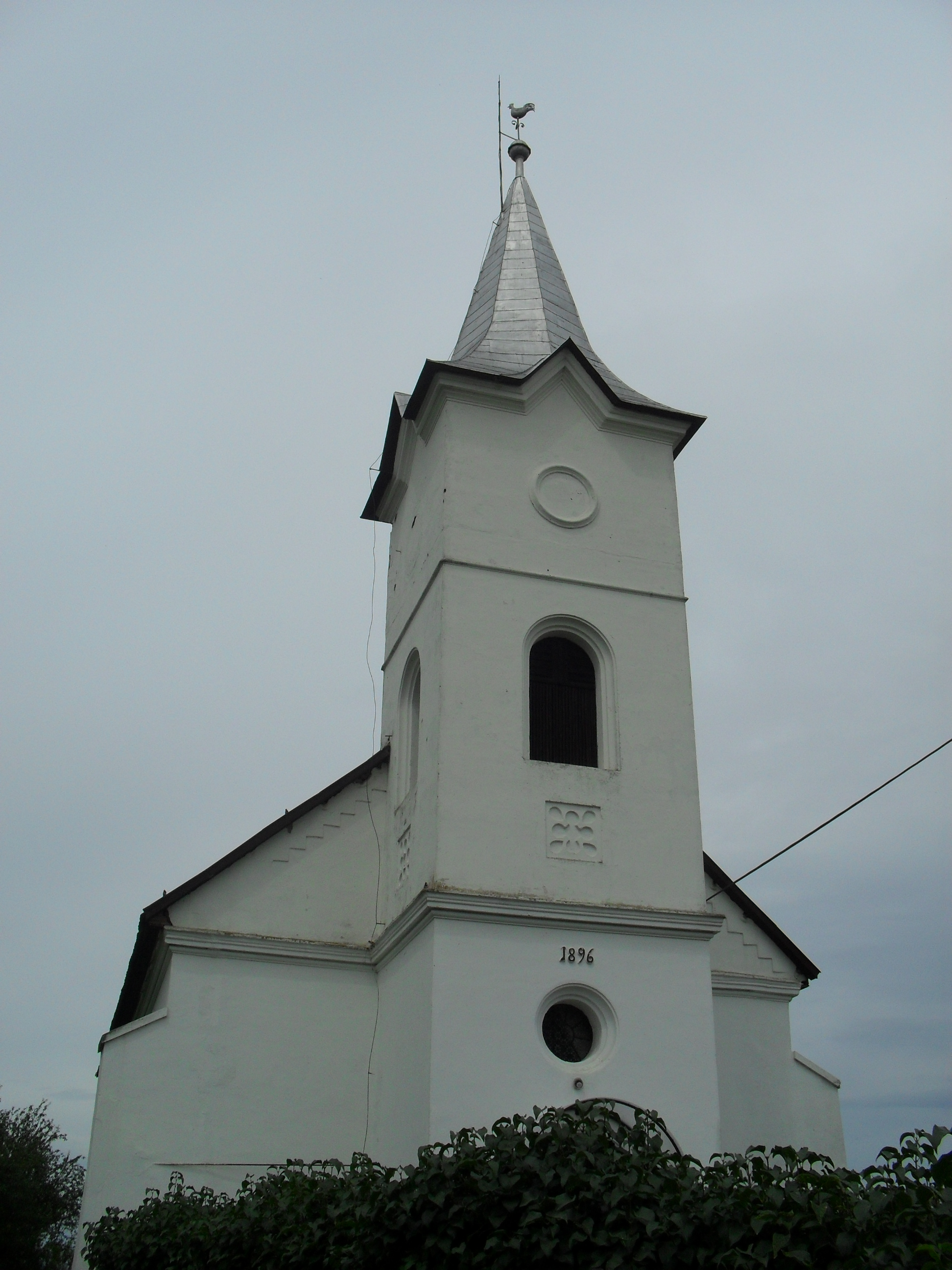

- Flag

- Location of Stránska in the Banská Bystrica Region Location of Stránska in Slovakia
- Coordinates: 48.40°N 20.28°E
- Country: Slovakia
- Region: Banská Bystrica Region
- District: Rimavská Sobota District
- First mentioned: 1332

Area
  - Total: 4.87 km^{2} (1.88 sq mi)
- Elevation: 185 m (607 ft)

Population (2025)
  - Total: 370
- Time zone: UTC+1 (CET)
  - Summer (DST): UTC+2 (CEST)
- Postal code: 982 51
- Area code: +421 47
- Vehicle registration plate (until 2022): RS
- Website: www.gemernet.sk/stranska/

Stránska (Hungarian: Oldalfala) is a village and municipality in the Rimavská Sobota District of the Banská Bystrica Region of southern Slovakia.

== Geography ==
The municipality lies at an altitude of 185 metres (607 ft) and covers an area of 4.87 km^{2} (1.88 sq mi) (2025).

== Population ==
Population statistic (10 years)
Year	1995	2005	2015	2025
Count	311	320	348	370
Difference		+2.89%	+8.75%	+6.32%

Population statistic
Year	2024	2025
Count	367	370
Difference		+0.81%

It has a population of 370 people (31 December 2025).

=== Ethnicity ===
Census 2021 (1+ %)
Ethnicity	Number	Fraction
Slovak	172	50.43%
Hungarian	169	49.56%
Romani	81	23.75%
Not found out	5	1.46%
Total	341	

In year 2021 was 341 people by ethnicity 172 as Slovak, 169 as Hungarian, 81 as Romani, 5 as Not found out and 3 as Czech.

Note on population: The difference values of population numbers in the table "Population statistic" and in the sections "Ethnicity" & "Religion" is caused by the use of various statistical methods.

=== Religion ===
Census 2021 (1+ %)
Religion	Number	Fraction
Roman Catholic Church	178	52.2%
None	92	26.98%
Calvinist Church	42	12.32%
Evangelical Church	11	3.23%
Not found out	7	2.05%
Greek Catholic Church	4	1.17%
Total	341	

In year 2021 was 341 people by religion 178 from Roman Catholic Church, 92 from None, 42 from Calvinist Church, 11 from Evangelical Church, 7 from Not found out, 4 from Greek Catholic Church, 3 from Christian Congregations in Slovakia, 2 from Jehovah's Witnesses, 1 from United Methodist Church and 1 from Buddhism.
