= Gemerské Michalovce =

Municipality of Slovakia

Gemerské Michalovce Gömörmihályfalva
- Municipality
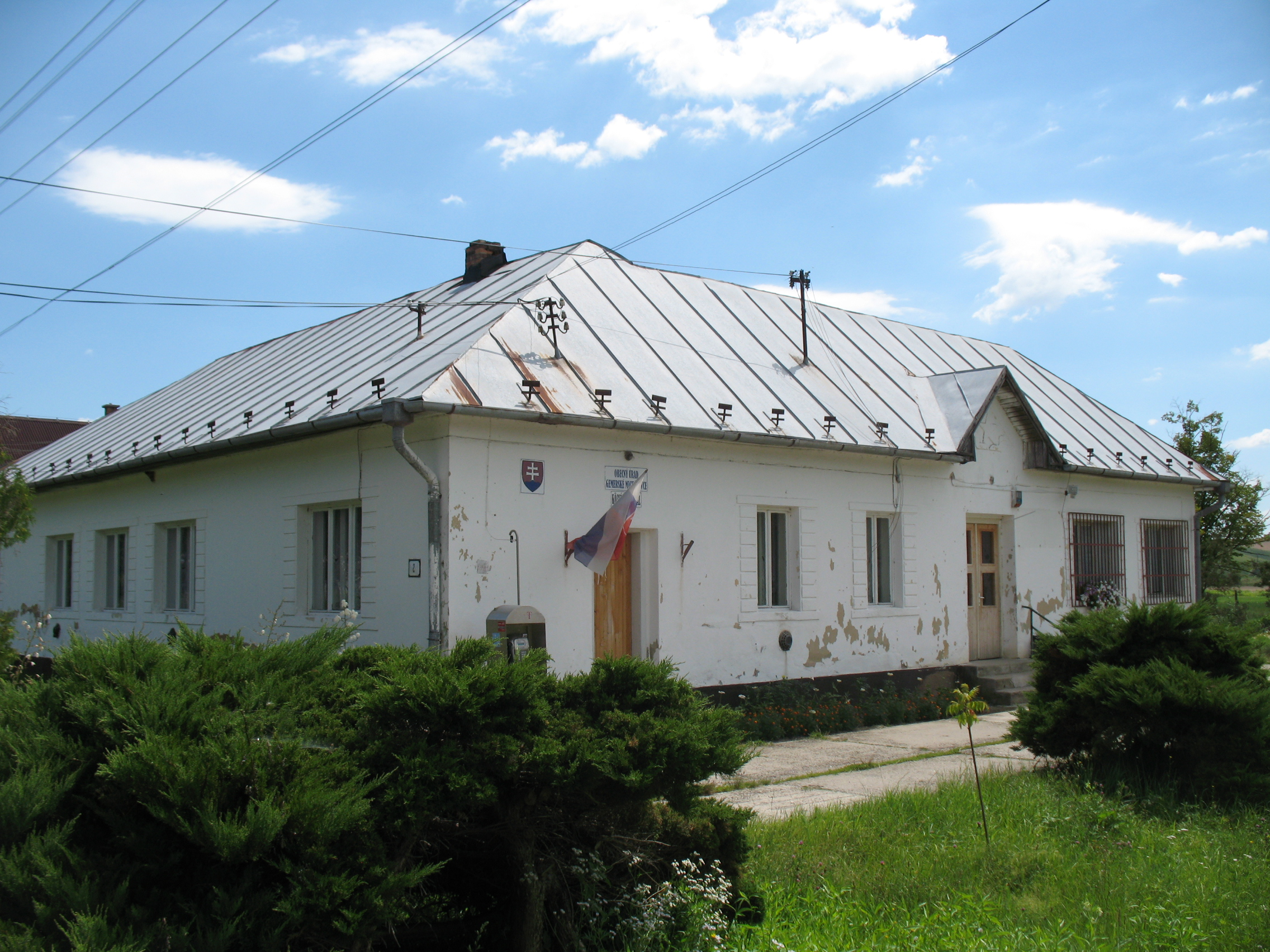

- Flag

- Location of Gemerské Michalovce in the Banská Bystrica Region Location of Gemerské Michalovce in Slovakia
- Coordinates: 48.43°N 20.22°E
- Country: Slovakia
- Region: Banská Bystrica Region
- District: Rimavská Sobota District
- First mentioned: 1413

Area
  - Total: 6.25 km^{2} (2.41 sq mi)
- Elevation: 195 m (640 ft)

Population (2025)
  - Total: 88
- Time zone: UTC+1 (CET)
  - Summer (DST): UTC+2 (CEST)
- Postal code: 982 52
- Area code: +421 47
- Vehicle registration plate (until 2022): RS

Gemerské Michalovce (Hungarian: Gömörmihályfalva) is a village and municipality in the Rimavská Sobota District of the Banská Bystrica Region of southern Slovakia.

== Geography ==
The municipality lies at an altitude of 195 metres (640 ft) and covers an area of 6.25 km^{2} (2.41 sq mi) (2025).

== History ==
In historical records the village was first mentioned in 1413 (Mychalfalwa). From 1938 to 1945 it belonged to Hungary.

== Population ==
Population statistic (10 years)
Year	1995	2005	2015	2025
Count	97	105	95	88
Difference		+8.24%	−9.52%	−7.36%

Population statistic
Year	2024	2025
Count	90	88
Difference		−2.22%

It has a population of 88 people (31 December 2025).

=== Ethnicity ===
Census 2021 (1+ %)
Ethnicity	Number	Fraction
Hungarian	70	79.54%
Slovak	18	20.45%
Czech	4	4.54%
Not found out	3	3.4%
Total	88	

In year 2021 was 88 people by ethnicity 70 as Hungarian, 18 as Slovak, 4 as Czech and 3 as Not found out.

Note on population: The difference values of population numbers in the table "Population statistic" and in the sections "Ethnicity" & "Religion" is caused by the use of various statistical methods.

=== Religion ===
Census 2021 (1+ %)
Religion	Number	Fraction
Calvinist Church	47	53.41%
None	24	27.27%
Roman Catholic Church	15	17.05%
Not found out	2	2.27%
Total	88	

In year 2021 was 88 people by religion 47 from Calvinist Church, 24 from None, 15 from Roman Catholic Church and 2 from Not found out.

== Genealogical resources ==
The records for genealogical research are available at the state archive "Statny Archiv in Banska Bystrica, Slovakia"

- Roman Catholic church records (births/marriages/deaths): 1829-1887 (parish B)
- Lutheran church records (births/marriages/deaths): 1730-1895 (parish B)
- Reformated church records (births/marriages/deaths): 1731-1898 (parish B)

== See also ==
- List of municipalities and towns in Slovakia
