= Španie Pole =

Španie Pole Gömörispánmező
- Municipality
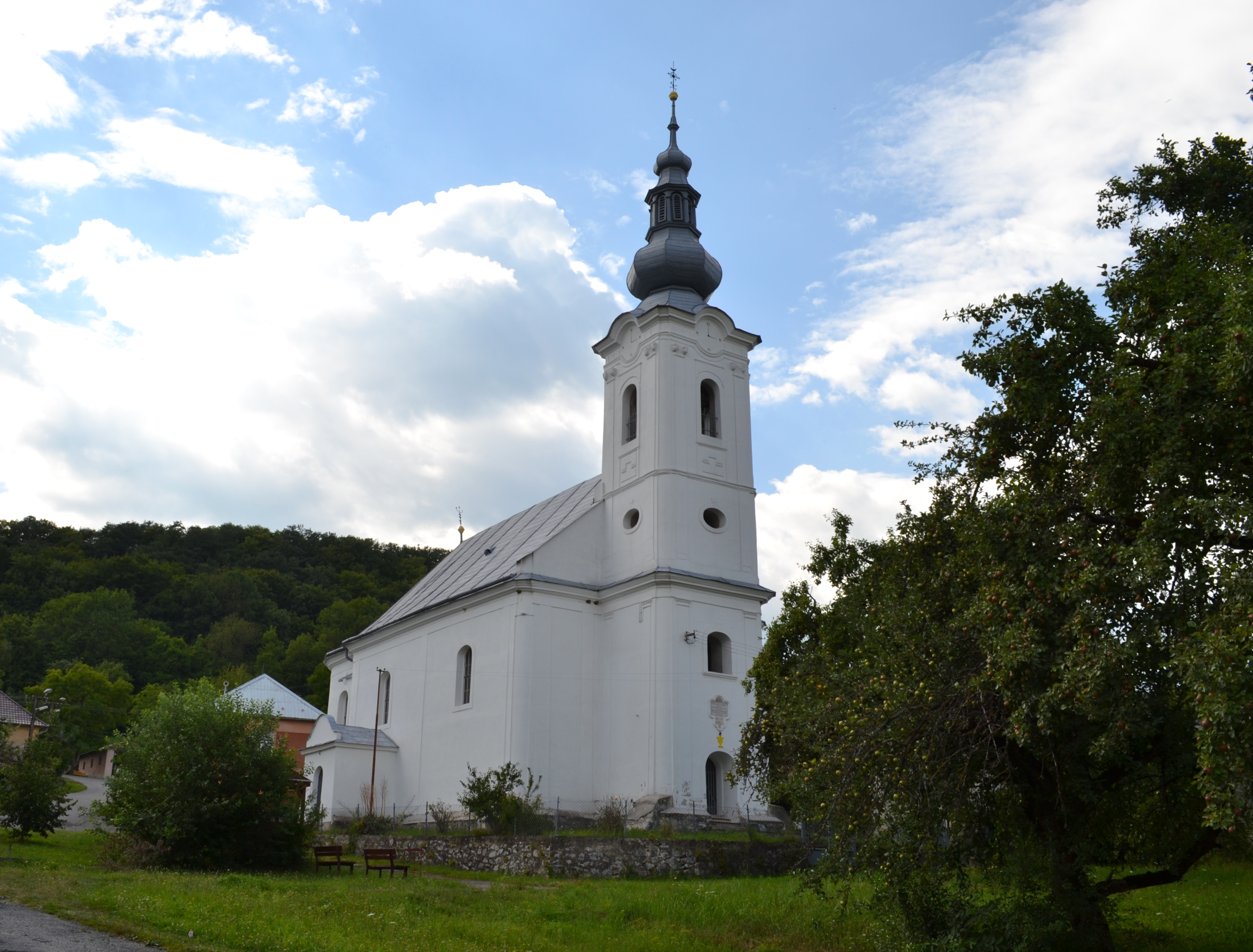

- Flag

- Location of Španie Pole in the Banská Bystrica Region Location of Španie Pole in Slovakia
- Coordinates: 48.52°N 20.13°E
- Country: Slovakia
- Region: Banská Bystrica Region
- District: Rimavská Sobota District
- First mentioned: 1301

Area
  - Total: 9.19 km^{2} (3.55 sq mi)
- Elevation: 381 m (1,250 ft)

Population (2025)
  - Total: 76
- Time zone: UTC+1 (CET)
  - Summer (DST): UTC+2 (CEST)
- Postal code: 980 23
- Area code: +421 47
- Vehicle registration plate (until 2022): RS

Španie Pole (Hungarian: Gömörispánmező) is a village and municipality in the Rimavská Sobota District of the Banská Bystrica Region of southern Slovakia.

== Geography ==
The municipality lies at an altitude of 381 metres (1,250 ft) and covers an area of 9.19 km^{2} (3.55 sq mi) (2025).

== Population ==
Population statistic (10 years)
Year	1995	2005	2015	2025
Count	105	87	84	76
Difference		−17.14%	−3.44%	−9.52%

Population statistic
Year	2024	2025
Count	72	76
Difference		+5.55%

It has a population of 76 people (31 December 2025).

=== Ethnicity ===
Census 2021 (1+ %)
Ethnicity	Number	Fraction
Slovak	73	96.05%
Romani	34	44.73%
Not found out	2	2.63%
Hungarian	1	1.31%
Total	76	

In year 2021 was 76 people by ethnicity 73 as Slovak, 34 as Romani, 2 as Not found out and 1 as Hungarian.

Note on population: The difference values of population numbers in the table "Population statistic" and in the sections "Ethnicity" & "Religion" is caused by the use of various statistical methods.

=== Religion ===
Census 2021 (1+ %)
Religion	Number	Fraction
None	37	48.68%
Roman Catholic Church	19	25%
Evangelical Church	16	21.05%
Calvinist Church	2	2.63%
Not found out	2	2.63%
Total	76	

In year 2021 was 76 people by religion 37 from None, 19 from Roman Catholic Church, 16 from Evangelical Church, 2 from Calvinist Church and 2 from Not found out.
