= Chrámec =

Village and municipality in Slovakia

Chrámec Harmac
- Municipality
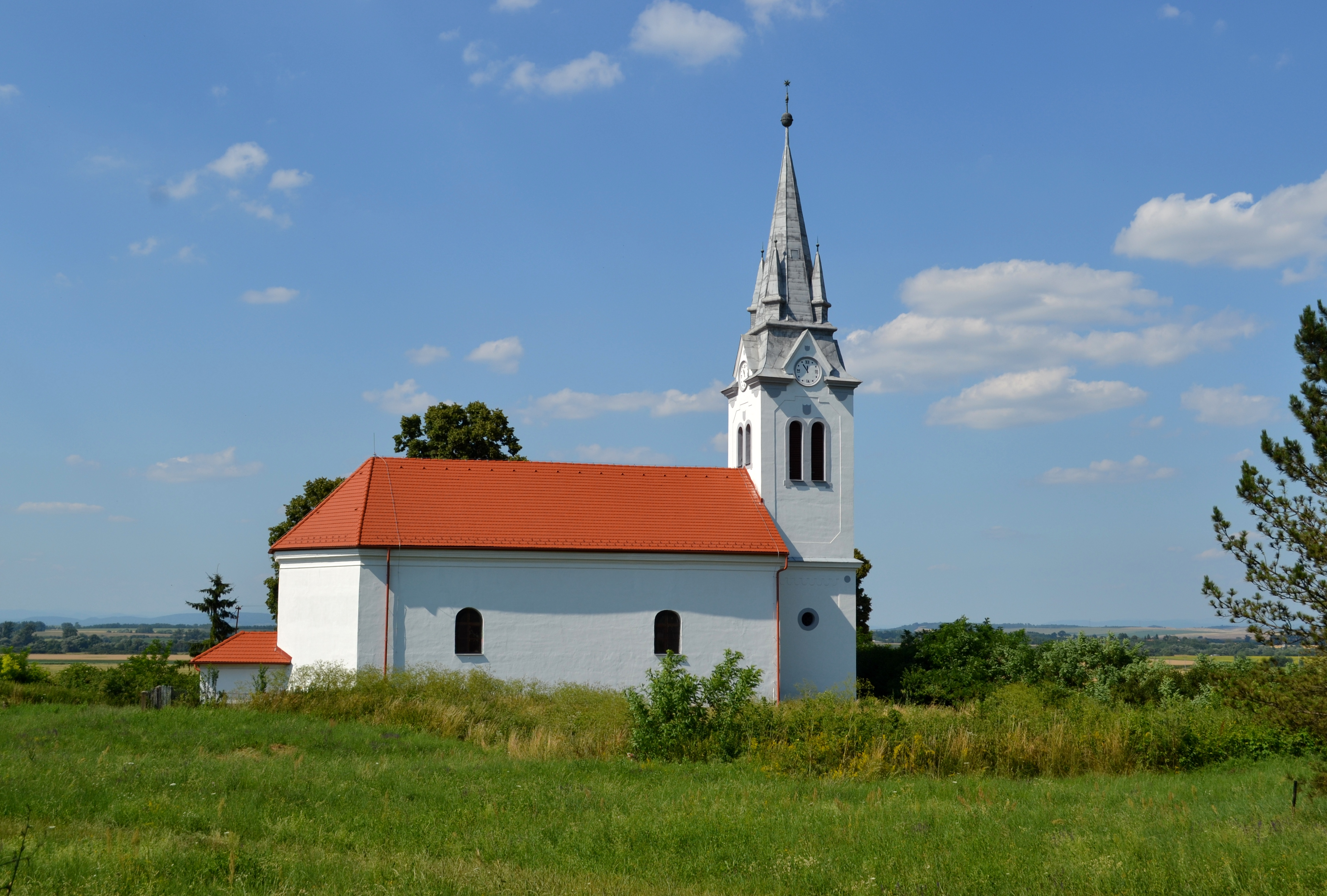

- Flag

- Location of Chrámec in the Banská Bystrica Region Location of Chrámec in Slovakia
- Coordinates: 48.28°N 20.18°E
- Country: Slovakia
- Region: Banská Bystrica Region
- District: Rimavská Sobota District
- First mentioned: 1246

Area
  - Total: 12.84 km^{2} (4.96 sq mi)
- Elevation: 176 m (577 ft)

Population (2025)
  - Total: 477
- Time zone: UTC+1 (CET)
  - Summer (DST): UTC+2 (CEST)
- Postal code: 980 42
- Area code: +421 47
- Vehicle registration plate (until 2022): RS
- Website: www.chramec.sk

Chrámec (Hungarian: Harmac) is a village and municipality in the Rimavská Sobota District of the Banská Bystrica Region of southern Slovakia.

== Geography ==
The municipality lies at an altitude of 176 metres (577 ft) and covers an area of 12.84 km^{2} (4.96 sq mi) (2025).

== History ==
Old settlement, in historical records, the village was first mentioned in 1246 (1246 Hajamuch, 1294 Harmach, 1348 Harmath), as belonging to feudatories Birin and Michael. After it passed to nobles Hunt-Poznany. From the 15th to the 16th century it belonged to local Paulin Friars. From 1938 to 1945 it was annexed by Hungary.

== Population ==
Population statistic (10 years)
Year	1995	2005	2015	2025
Count	376	387	456	477
Difference		+2.92%	+17.82%	+4.60%

Population statistic
Year	2024	2025
Count	461	477
Difference		+3.47%

It has a population of 477 people (31 December 2025).

=== Ethnicity ===
Census 2021 (1+ %)
Ethnicity	Number	Fraction
Hungarian	362	79.03%
Romani	230	50.21%
Slovak	80	17.46%
Not found out	21	4.58%
Czech	8	1.74%
Total	458	

In year 2021 was 458 people by ethnicity 362 as Hungarian, 230 as Romani, 80 as Slovak, 21 as Not found out, 8 as Czech and 1 as Romanian.

Note on population: The difference values of population numbers in the table "Population statistic" and in the sections "Ethnicity" & "Religion" is caused by the use of various statistical methods.

=== Religion ===
Census 2021 (1+ %)
Religion	Number	Fraction
None	159	34.72%
Roman Catholic Church	146	31.88%
Calvinist Church	109	23.8%
Not found out	16	3.49%
Evangelical Church	12	2.62%
Greek Catholic Church	10	2.18%
Total	458	

In year 2021 was 458 people by religion 159 from None, 146 from Roman Catholic Church, 109 from Calvinist Church, 16 from Not found out, 12 from Evangelical Church, 10 from Greek Catholic Church, 3 from Jehovah's Witnesses, 1 from Christian Congregations in Slovakia, 1 from Other and 1 from Apostolic Church.

== Genealogical resources ==
The records for genealogical research are available at the state archive "Statny Archiv in Banska Bystrica, Slovakia"

- Roman Catholic church records (births/marriages/deaths): 1745-1883 (parish B)
- Reformated church records (births/marriages/deaths): 1748-1897 (parish A)

== See also ==
- List of municipalities and towns in Slovakia
