= Slizké =

Slizké Szeleste
- Municipality
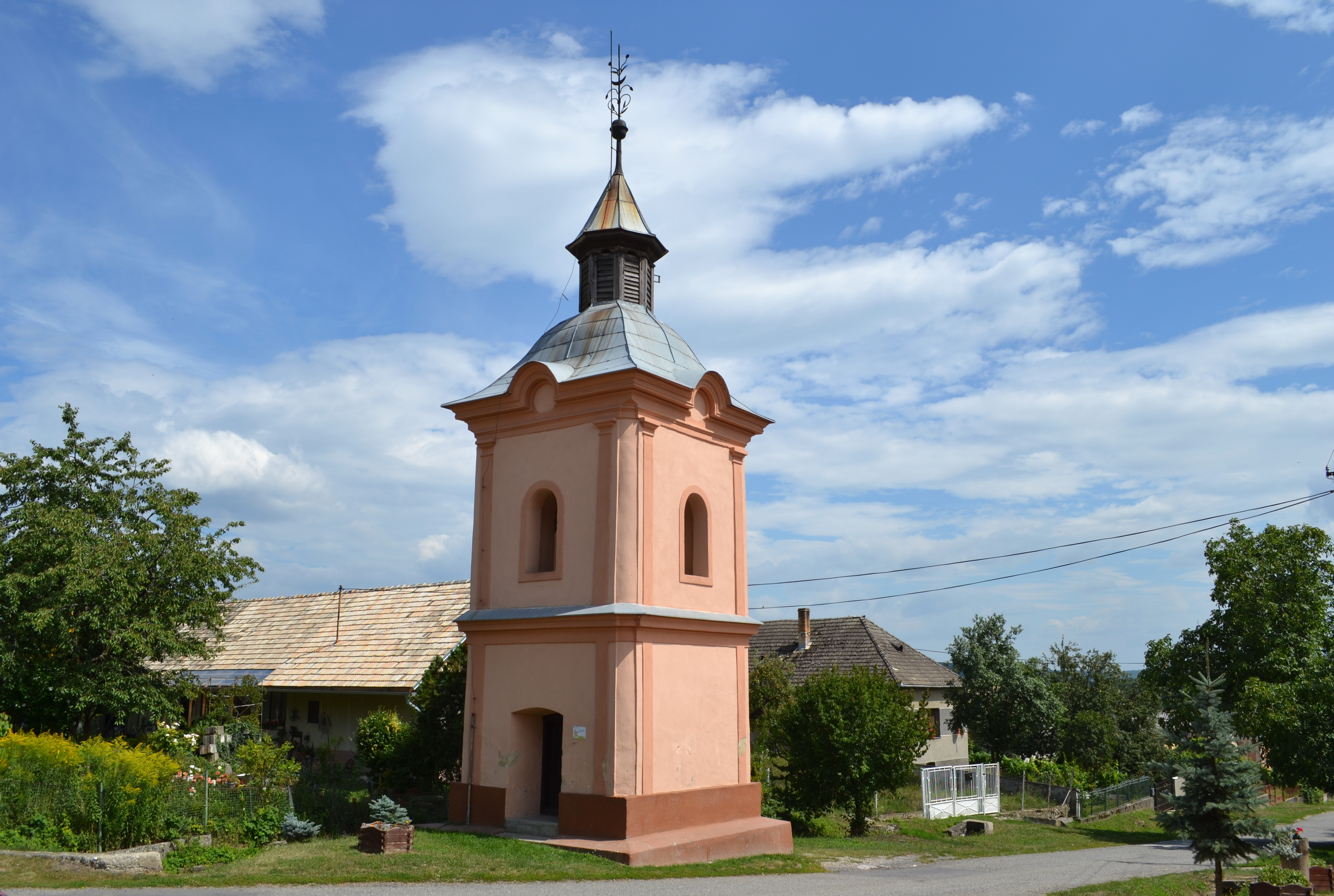

- Flag

- Location of Slizké in the Banská Bystrica Region Location of Slizké in Slovakia
- Coordinates: 48.52°N 20.08°E
- Country: Slovakia
- Region: Banská Bystrica Region
- District: Rimavská Sobota District
- First mentioned: 1258

Area
  - Total: 8.32 km^{2} (3.21 sq mi)
- Elevation: 401 m (1,316 ft)

Population (2025)
  - Total: 267
- Time zone: UTC+1 (CET)
  - Summer (DST): UTC+2 (CEST)
- Postal code: 980 23
- Area code: +421 47
- Vehicle registration plate (until 2022): RS

Slizké (Hungarian: Szeleste) is a village and municipality in the Rimavská Sobota District of the Banská Bystrica Region of southern Slovakia.

The village was first named in 1285 "Zyluche", as part of the Balog lands. In 1301, it was named "Styluche", in 1413 "Slyche", and in 1427 "Scylische, Sciliche".

== Geography ==
The municipality lies at an altitude of 401 metres (1,316 ft) and covers an area of 8.32 km^{2} (3.21 sq mi) (2025).

== Population ==
Population statistic (10 years)
Year	1995	2005	2015	2025
Count	136	136	221	267
Difference		−1.42%	+62.5%	+20.81%

Population statistic
Year	2024	2025
Count	265	267
Difference		+0.75%

It has a population of 267 people (31 December 2025).

=== Ethnicity ===
Census 2021 (1+ %)
Ethnicity	Number	Fraction
Slovak	239	98.76%
Hungarian	5	2.06%
Total	242	

In year 2021 was 242 people by ethnicity 239 as Slovak, 5 as Hungarian and 1 as Czech.

Note on population: The difference values of population numbers in the table "Population statistic" and in the sections "Ethnicity" & "Religion" is caused by the use of various statistical methods.

=== Religion ===
Census 2021 (1+ %)
Religion	Number	Fraction
None	215	88.84%
Roman Catholic Church	18	7.44%
Evangelical Church	7	2.89%
Total	242	

In year 2021 was 242 people by religion 215 from None, 18 from Roman Catholic Church, 7 from Evangelical Church and 2 from Jehovah's Witnesses.

The majority of the municipality's population consists of the members of the local Roma community. In 2019, they constituted an estimated 85% of the population.
