= Rimavské Zalužany =

Rimavské Zalužany Rimazsaluzsány
- Municipality
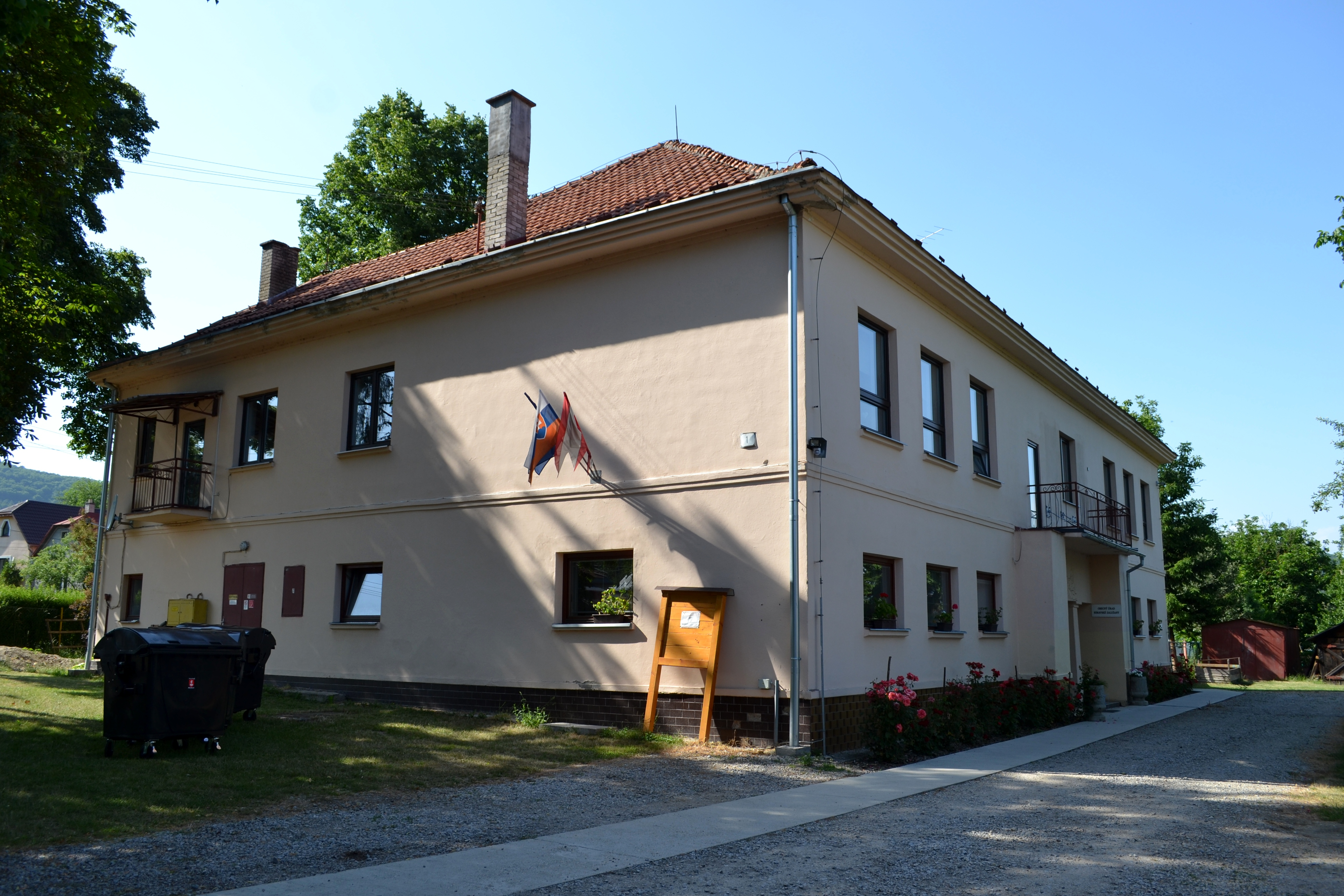

- Flag
- Interactive map of Rimavské Zalužany
- Coordinates: 48.50°N 19.94°E
- Country: Slovakia
- Region: Banská Bystrica Region
- District: Rimavská Sobota District
- First mentioned: 1362

Area
  - Total: 2.81 km^{2} (1.08 sq mi)
- Elevation: 250 m (820 ft)

Population (2025)
  - Total: 338
- Time zone: UTC+1 (CET)
  - Summer (DST): UTC+2 (CEST)
- Postal code: 980 53
- Area code: +421 47
- Vehicle registration plate (until 2022): RS
- Website: www.rimavskezaluzany.eu

Rimavské Zalužany (Hungarian: Rimazsaluzsány) is a village and municipality in the Rimavská Sobota District of the Banská Bystrica Region of southern Slovakia. In the village are a public library, kindergarten, train stop, foodstuff store and a pub. The most important sightseeing attraction is a 19th-century neogothic belfry.

== Geography ==
The municipality lies at an altitude of 250 metres (820 ft) and covers an area of 2.81 km^{2} (1.08 sq mi) (2025).

== Population ==
Population statistic (10 years)
Year	1995	2005	2015	2025
Count	376	320	343	338
Difference		−14.89%	+7.18%	−1.45%

Population statistic
Year	2024	2025
Count	339	338
Difference		−0.29%

It has a population of 338 people (31 December 2025).

=== Ethnicity ===
Census 2021 (1+ %)
Ethnicity	Number	Fraction
Slovak	342	97.71%
Not found out	7	2%
Total	350	

In year 2021 was 350 people by ethnicity 342 as Slovak, 7 as Not found out and 1 as Czech.

Note on population: The difference values of population numbers in the table "Population statistic" and in the sections "Ethnicity" & "Religion" is caused by the use of various statistical methods.

=== Religion ===
Census 2021 (1+ %)
Religion	Number	Fraction
None	175	50%
Roman Catholic Church	113	32.29%
Evangelical Church	42	12%
Not found out	14	4%
Total	350	

In year 2021 was 350 people by religion 175 from None, 113 from Roman Catholic Church, 42 from Evangelical Church, 14 from Not found out, 3 from Ad hoc movements, 1 from Other and not ascertained christian church, 1 from Christian Congregations in Slovakia and 1 from Greek Catholic Church.
