= Rimavská Sobota District =

Coordinates: 48°23′0″N 20°1′6″E

- District
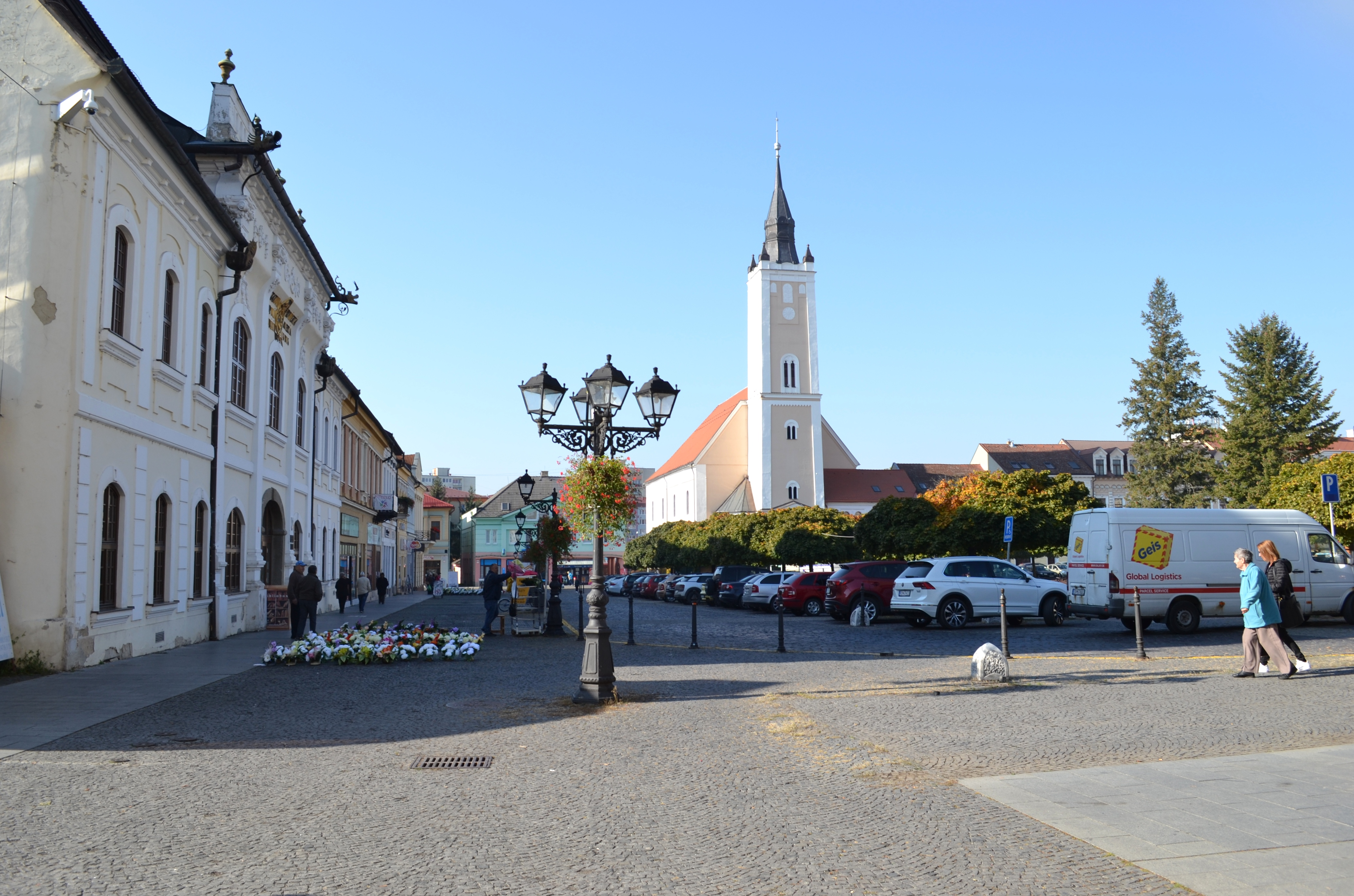
- Country: Slovakia
- Region (kraj): Banská Bystrica Region
- Seat: Rimavská Sobota

Area
  - Total: 1,471.07 km^{2} (567.98 sq mi)

Population (2025)
  - Total: 79,222
- Time zone: UTC+1 (CET)
  - Summer (DST): UTC+2 (CEST)
- Telephone prefix: 047
- Vehicle registration plate (until 2022): RS
- Municipalities: 107

Rimavská Sobota District (Slovak: okres Rimavská Sobota) is a district in the Banská Bystrica Region of central Slovakia.

The district was first established in 1923 and from 1996 exists in its present borders. The population density is approximately half of Slovakia average. The seat is its biggest town Rimavská Sobota. District north is more industrial, while district south more agricultural area. Rimavská Sobota District consists of 107 municipalities, from which Rimavská Sobota, Hnúšťa and Tisovec have the town status.

== Population ==
Population statistic (10 years)
Year	1995	2005	2015	2025
Count	82,106	82,648	84,577	79,222
Difference		+0.66%	+2.33%	−6.33%

Population statistic
Year	2024	2025
Count	79,455	79,222
Difference		−0.29%

It has a population of 79,222 people (31 December 2025).

Historical population
Year	Pop.	±%
1970	79,938	—
1980	81,401	+1.8%
1991	82,133	+0.9%
2001	83,124	+1.2%
2011	84,889	+2.1%
2021	80,666	−5.0%
Source: Statistical Office of the Slovak Republic

=== Ethnicity ===
Census 2021 (1+ %)
Ethnicity	Number	Fraction
Slovak	41,960	45.61%
Hungarian	34,853	37.89%
Romani	9826	10.68%
Not found out	4519	4.91%
Total	91,983	

In year 2021 was 91,983 people by ethnicity 41,960 as Slovak, 34,853 as Hungarian, 9826 as Romani, 4519 as Not found out, 341 as Czech, 119 as Other, 55 as German, 44 as Ukrainian, 35 as Russian, 33 as Rusyn, 31 as Chinese, 23 as Polish, 22 as English, 19 as Vietnamese, 14 as Jewish, 14 as Romanian, 12 as Turkish, 11 as Irish, 9 as Italian, 9 as Austrian, 8 as French, 7 as Moravian, 6 as Bulgarian, 5 as Serbian, 3 as Canadian, 2 as Croatian, 2 as Albanian and 1 as Greek.

Note on population: The difference values of population numbers in the table "Population statistic" and in the sections "Ethnicity" & "Religion" is caused by the use of various statistical methods.

=== Religion ===
Census 2021 (1+ %)
Religion	Number	Fraction
Roman Catholic Church	34,147	42.33%
None	24,603	30.5%
Evangelical Church	6914	8.57%
Calvinist Church	6591	8.17%
Not found out	6015	7.46%
Total	80,666	

In year 2021 was 80,666 people by religion 34,147 from Roman Catholic Church, 24,603 from None, 6914 from Evangelical Church, 6591 from Calvinist Church, 6015 from Not found out, 694 from Greek Catholic Church, 640 from Jehovah's Witnesses, 201 from Christian Congregations in Slovakia, 128 from Other and not ascertained christian church, 121 from Ad hoc movements, 100 from United Methodist Church, 95 from Other, 87 from Baptists Church, 65 from Buddhism, 64 from Eastern Orthodox Church, 46 from Old Catholic Church, 36 from Islam, 30 from Paganism and natural spirituality, 30 from Seventh-day Adventist Church, 25 from Apostolic Church, 18 from Jewish community, 12 from Church of the Brethren, 2 from Hinduism, 1 from Czechoslovak Hussite Church and 1 from Church of Jesus Christ of Latter-day Saints.

== Municipalities ==
Municipality	Area [km^{2}]	Population
Abovce	8.19	605
Babinec	4.91	66
Barca	11.50	611
Bátka	11.80	809
Belín	4.19	177
Blhovce	18.74	780
Bottovo	10.78	203
Budikovany	3.33	62
Cakov	4.29	373
Čerenčany	5.06	528
Čierny Potok	5.90	117
Číž	6.14	685
Dolné Zahorany	6.38	174
Dražice	11.50	248
Drienčany	10.99	196
Drňa	12.31	212
Dubno	3.61	140
Dubovec	9.19	521
Dulovo	4.63	282
Figa	9.20	422
Gemerček	11.67	88
Gemerské Dechtáre	20.20	410
Gemerské Michalovce	6.25	88
Gemerský Jablonec	10.44	706
Gortva	9.63	474
Hajnáčka	25.67	1,152
Hnúšťa	68.04	6,386
Hodejov	17.24	1,515
Hodejovec	11.32	156
Horné Zahorany	5.23	109
Hostice	21.12	1,058
Hostišovce	10.42	223
Hrachovo	11.84	790
Hrušovo	15.77	154
Hubovo	11.08	111
Husiná	19.64	560
Chanava	18.92	698
Chrámec	12.84	477
Ivanice	5.60	242
Janice	8.59	318
Jesenské	17.13	2,357
Jestice	7.55	150
Kaloša	15.13	827
Kesovce	7.65	312
Klenovec	99.99	2,942
Kociha	11.40	188
Konrádovce	7.92	342
Kráľ	11.07	930
Kraskovo	7.16	108
Krokava	10.27	20
Kružno	6.19	359
Kyjatice	6.15	63
Lehota nad Rimavicou	30.06	250
Lenartovce	6.81	563
Lenka	6.09	200
Lipovec	4.09	86
Lukovištia	14.29	195
Martinová	3.77	204
Neporadza	7.01	294
Nižný Skálnik	5.30	185
Nová Bašta	13.18	507
Orávka	7.18	155
Ožďany	37.17	1,564
Padarovce	12.11	137
Pavlovce	7.07	429
Petrovce	19.07	209
Poproč	4.03	32
Potok	8.91	21
Radnovce	8.32	1,034
Rakytník	8.36	347
Ratkovská Lehota	5.59	38
Ratkovská Suchá	5.80	38
Riečka	4.77	219
Rimavská Baňa	28.04	483
Rimavská Seč	17.32	2,234
Rimavská Sobota	77.55	20,964
Rimavské Brezovo	14.09	506
Rimavské Janovce	26.09	1,494
Rimavské Zalužany	2.81	338
Rovné	9.15	103
Rumince	12.05	347
Slizké	8.32	267
Stará Bašta	8.37	327
Stránska	4.87	370
Studená	1.72	286
Sútor	13.25	706
Šimonovce	7.82	509
Širkovce	17.71	949
Španie Pole	9.19	76
Štrkovec	4.35	377
Tachty	7.83	550
Teplý Vrch	5.98	306
Tisovec	123.42	3,533
Tomášovce	6.44	258
Uzovská Panica	20.85	853
Valice	7.46	355
Včelince	13.11	811
Večelkov	5.33	222
Veľké Teriakovce	22.35	834
Veľký Blh	33.01	1,140
Vieska nad Blhom	4.82	169
Vlkyňa	11.72	406
Vyšné Valice	13.01	257
Vyšný Skálnik	5.05	143
Zádor	3.46	132
Zacharovce	6.81	378
Žíp	6.35	308

Population and area values are current for year 2025.
