= Ratkovská Lehota =

Ratkovská Lehota Ratkószabadi
- Municipality
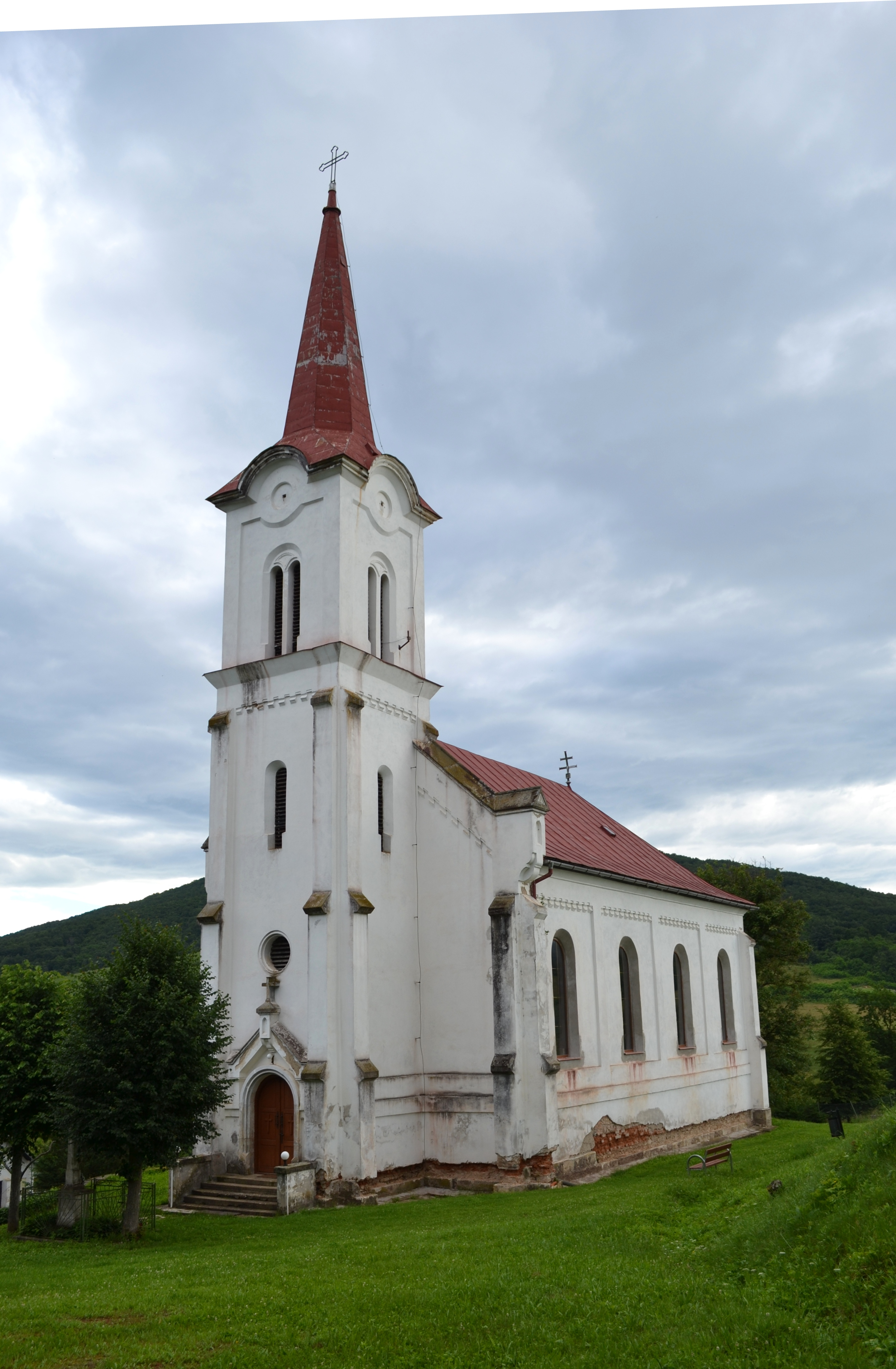

- Flag

- Location of Ratkovská Lehota in the Banská Bystrica Region Location of Ratkovská Lehota in Slovakia
- Coordinates: 48.55°N 20.10°E
- Country: Slovakia
- Region: Banská Bystrica Region
- District: Rimavská Sobota District
- First mentioned: 1413

Area
  - Total: 5.59 km^{2} (2.16 sq mi)
- Elevation: 285 m (935 ft)

Population (2025)
  - Total: 38
- Time zone: UTC+1 (CET)
  - Summer (DST): UTC+2 (CEST)
- Postal code: 982 65
- Area code: +421 47
- Vehicle registration plate (until 2022): RS
- Website: www.ratkovskalehota.sk

Ratkovská Lehota (Hungarian: Ratkószabadi) is a village and municipality in the Rimavská Sobota District of the Banská Bystrica Region of southern Slovakia. In the second half of the 16th century the village was pillaged, but resettled by the end of the 17th century. Main engagement of the locals is agriculture. Interesting sightseeing is evangelical church from 1787.

== Geography ==
The municipality lies at an altitude of 285 metres (935 ft) and covers an area of 5.59 km^{2} (2.16 sq mi) (2025).

== Population ==
Population statistic (10 years)
Year	1995	2005	2015	2025
Count	63	65	55	38
Difference		+3.17%	−15.38%	−30.90%

Population statistic
Year	2024	2025
Count	37	38
Difference		+2.70%

It has a population of 38 people (31 December 2025).

=== Ethnicity ===
Census 2021 (1+ %)
Ethnicity	Number	Fraction
Slovak	45	100%
Total	45	

In year 2021 was 45 people by ethnicity 45 as Slovak.

Note on population: The difference values of population numbers in the table "Population statistic" and in the sections "Ethnicity" & "Religion" is caused by the use of various statistical methods.

=== Religion ===
Census 2021 (1+ %)
Religion	Number	Fraction
Roman Catholic Church	38	84.44%
Evangelical Church	4	8.89%
None	3	6.67%
Total	45	

In year 2021 was 45 people by religion 38 from Roman Catholic Church, 4 from Evangelical Church and 3 from None.
