= 2012–13 Majstrovstvá regiónu =

Majstrovstvá regiónu
- Season: 2012–13

The 2012–13 season of Majstrovstvá regiónu is the twentieth season of the fourth-tier football league in Slovakia, since its establishment in 1993.

64 teams are geographically divided into four groups: Majstrovstvá regiónu Bratislava, Majstrovstvá regiónu Západ, Majstrovstvá regiónu Stred and Majstrovstvá regiónu Východ (16 teams each). Teams are playing against teams in their own division only.

== Majstrovstvá regiónu Bratislava ==
=== Team changes from 2011–12 ===
- Promoted in 3. liga: ↑LP Domino↑
- Relegated from 3. liga: None.
- Promoted in Majstrovstvá regiónu: ↑Inter Bratislava↑, ↑FC Rohožník↑
- Relegated from Majstrovstvá regiónu: ↓Iskra Petržalka↓

=== Locations ===
Location of teams in Majstrovstvá regiónu Bratislava 2012–13

=== League table ===
Pos	Team	Pld	W	D	L	GF	GA	GD	Pts	Promotion or relegation
1	Rohožník	16	11	3	2	39	19	+20	36	Promotion to 3. liga
2	Rača	16	10	3	3	42	13	+29	33	
3	Kráľová pri Senci	16	10	3	3	32	14	+18	33	
4	Bernolákovo	16	9	3	4	25	16	+9	30	
5	Inter Bratislava	16	8	6	2	26	17	+9	30	
6	Slovenský Grob	16	8	5	3	33	16	+17	29	
7	Rovinka	16	7	6	3	32	20	+12	27	
8	Plavecký Štvrtok	16	6	5	5	34	22	+12	23	
9	Lozorno	16	5	6	5	19	18	+1	21	
10	Ivanka pri Dunaji	16	4	4	8	22	29	−7	16	
11	Dúbravka	15	4	4	7	16	27	−11	16	
12	Svätý Jur	16	4	3	9	16	25	−9	15	
13	Limbach	16	4	3	9	12	30	−18	15	
14	Ružinov	15	4	1	10	18	31	−13	13	
15	Stupava	16	1	4	11	13	48	−35	7	Relegation to 4. liga
16	Jablonec	16	1	3	12	12	46	−34	6	Relegation to 4. liga

Rules for classification: 1) points; 2) goal difference; 3) number of goals scored.

== Majstrovstvá regiónu Západ ==
=== Team changes from 2011–12 ===
- Promoted in 3. liga: ↑Piešťany↑, ↑Levice↑
- Relegated from 3. liga: None.
- Promoted in Majstrovstvá regiónu: ↑Lednické Rovne↑, ↑Neded↑, ↑Beluša↑
- Relegated from Majstrovstvá regiónu: ↓Dunajská Streda B↓

=== Locations ===
Location of teams in Majstrovstvá regiónu Západ 2012–13

=== League table ===
Pos	Team	Pld	W	D	L	GF	GA	GD	Pts	Promotion or relegation
1	Šúrovce	16	11	3	2	31	19	+12	36	Promotion to 3. liga
2	Komárno	16	9	5	2	30	16	+14	32	
3	Palárikovo	16	8	6	2	21	13	+8	30	
4	Skalica	16	8	5	3	31	16	+15	29	
5	Topoľníky	16	8	2	6	21	27	−6	26	
6	Crystal Lednické Rovne	16	7	4	5	28	15	+13	25	
7	Galanta	16	6	3	7	27	23	+4	21	
8	Beluša	16	5	6	5	16	15	+1	21	
9	Gabčíkovo	16	6	3	7	20	21	−1	21	
10	Jaslovské Bohunice	16	6	3	7	25	27	−2	21	
11	Veľké Ludince	16	6	3	7	20	23	−3	21	
12	Bánovce nad Bebravou	16	6	1	9	12	19	−7	19	
13	Domaniža	15	5	1	9	17	30	−13	16	
14	Nová Ves nad Váhom	15	1	4	10	6	25	−19	7	
15	Neded	16	1	3	12	14	30	−16	6	Relegation to 4. liga
16	Považská Bystrica (Note: FK Raven Považská Bystrica resigned from Majstrovstvá regiónu - Západ due financial crisis following lost main sponsor.) (R)	0	0	0	0	0	0	0	0	Relegation to 4. liga

Rules for classification: 1) points; 2) goal difference; 3) number of goals scored.
(R) Relegated

== Majstrovstvá regiónu Stred ==
=== Team changes from 2011–12 ===
- Promoted in 3. liga: ↑Martin↑
- Relegated from 3. liga: ↓Zvolen↓
- Promoted in Majstrovstvá regiónu: ↑Bytča↑, ↑Brusno↑, ↑Dolná Tižina↑
- Relegated from Majstrovstvá regiónu: ↓Turany↓, ↓Lietavská Lúčka↓

=== Locations ===
Location of teams in Majstrovstvá regiónu Stred 2012–13

=== League table ===
Pos	Team	Pld	W	D	L	GF	GA	GD	Pts	Promotion or relegation
1	Dolná Tižina	6	4	1	1	9	8	+1	13	Promotion to 3. liga
2	Liptovská Štiavnica	6	4	0	2	19	5	+14	12	
3	MFK Banská Bystrica	5	4	0	1	10	6	+4	12	
4	Krásno nad Kysucou	6	3	2	1	9	7	+2	11	
5	Brusno - Ondrej	5	3	1	1	14	7	+7	10	
6	Závažná Poruba	5	3	1	1	11	4	+7	10	
7	Žilina B	5	3	1	1	10	4	+6	10	
8	Čadca	6	3	1	2	11	10	+1	10	
9	Kysucké Nové Mesto	6	3	0	3	12	12	0	9	
10	Kalinovo	5	2	2	1	8	3	+5	8	
11	Bytča	6	2	1	3	6	11	−5	7	
12	Banská Štiavnica	5	2	0	3	7	11	−4	6	
13	Pohronie B	6	1	1	4	6	15	−9	4	
14	Nová Baňa	5	0	3	2	7	10	−3	3	
15	CSM Tisovec	6	0	0	6	3	13	−10	0	Relegation to 4. liga
16	Zvolen	5	0	0	5	1	17	−16	0	Relegation to 4. liga

Rules for classification: 1) points; 2) goal difference; 3) number of goals scored.

== Majstrovstvá regiónu Východ ==
=== Team changes from 2011–12 ===
- Promoted in 3. liga: ↑1. HFC Humenné↑
- Relegated from 3. liga: ↓Stará Ľubovňa↓
- Promoted in Majstrovstvá regiónu: ↑Vysoké Tatry↑, ↑Veľké Revištia↑
- Relegated from Majstrovstvá regiónu: ↓Nižný Hrušov↓

=== Locations ===
Location of teams in Slovak Fourth Football League 2012–13

=== League table ===
Pos	Team	Pld	W	D	L	GF	GA	GD	Pts	Promotion or relegation
1	Bardejovská Nová Ves	19	12	4	3	36	16	+20	40	Promotion to 3. liga
2	Haniska	17	9	2	6	21	24	−3	29	
3	Barca	17	8	4	5	32	18	+14	28	
4	Vyšné Opátske	19	7	6	6	33	20	+13	27	
5	Snina	17	6	8	3	21	11	+10	26	
6	Stropkov	18	8	2	8	34	25	+9	26	
7	Michalovce B	18	6	7	5	27	19	+8	25	
8	Vysoké Tatry – Starý Smokovec	17	7	4	6	21	18	+3	25	
9	Giraltovce	18	5	7	6	13	22	−9	22	
10	Veľké Revištia	16	6	3	7	31	33	−2	21	
11	Sabinov	18	5	6	7	21	25	−4	21	
12	Svidník	16	6	0	10	15	21	−6	18	
13	Svit	17	4	6	7	17	26	−9	18	
14	Spišské Podhradie	17	4	6	7	12	22	−10	18	
15	Stará Ľubovňa	16	3	3	10	13	38	−25	12	Relegation to 4. liga
16	Krásna (Note: MFK Hornád Košice - Krásna resigned from Majstrovstvá regiónu - Východ due financial crisis following lack of money.) (R)	0	0	0	0	0	0	0	0	Relegation to 4. liga

Rules for classification: 1) points; 2) goal difference; 3) number of goals scored.
(R) Relegated
