= 2011–12 Majstrovstvá regiónu =

Majstrovstvá regiónu
- Season: 2011–12
- Champions: Jablonec (group Bratislava); Piešťany (group West); Martin (group Middle); Humenné (group East)
- Promoted: LP Domino; Piešťany; Levice; Martin; Humenné

The 2011–12 season of Majstrovstvá regiónu was the nineteenth season of the fourth-tier football league in Slovakia, since its establishment in 1993.

64 teams were geographically divided into four groups: Majstrovstvá regiónu Bratislava, Majstrovstvá regiónu Západ, Majstrovstvá regiónu Stred and Majstrovstvá regiónu Východ (16 teams each). Teams were played against teams in their own division only.

== Majstrovstvá regiónu Bratislava ==
=== League table ===
| Pos | Team | Pld | W | D | L | GF | GA | GD | Pts | Promotion or relegation |
|---|---|---|---|---|---|---|---|---|---|---|
| 1 | Jablonec (C) | 30 | 18 | 7 | 5 | 38 | 26 | +12 | 61 | |
| 2 | Plavecký Štvrtok | 30 | 19 | 4 | 7 | 88 | 26 | +62 | 61 | |
| 3 | LP Domino (P) | 30 | 17 | 9 | 4 | 58 | 23 | +35 | 60 | Promotion to 3. liga |
| 4 | Stupava | 30 | 13 | 10 | 7 | 55 | 42 | +13 | 49 | |
| 5 | Rača | 30 | 13 | 6 | 11 | 54 | 42 | +12 | 45 | |
| 6 | Svätý Jur | 30 | 13 | 6 | 11 | 53 | 44 | +9 | 45 | |
| 7 | Ivanka pri Dunaji | 30 | 12 | 9 | 9 | 53 | 46 | +7 | 45 | |
| 8 | Dúbravka | 30 | 14 | 5 | 11 | 49 | 53 | −4 | 44 (Note: FC ŠKP Dúbravka Bratislava was docked 3 points.) | |
| 9 | Rovinka | 30 | 11 | 8 | 11 | 47 | 44 | +3 | 41 | |
| 10 | Kráľová pri Senci | 30 | 11 | 7 | 12 | 40 | 49 | −9 | 40 | |
| 11 | Bernolákovo | 30 | 10 | 8 | 12 | 51 | 52 | −1 | 38 | |
| 12 | Lozorno | 30 | 8 | 6 | 16 | 38 | 61 | −23 | 30 | |
| 13 | Ružinov | 30 | 9 | 2 | 19 | 25 | 51 | −26 | 29 | |
| 14 | Limbach | 30 | 8 | 4 | 18 | 34 | 59 | −25 | 28 | |
| 15 | Slovenský Grob | 30 | 6 | 6 | 18 | 35 | 63 | −28 | 24 | |
| 16 | Iskra Petržalka (R) | 30 | 7 | 5 | 18 | 29 | 66 | −37 | 23 (Note: MŠK Iskra Petržalka was docked 3 points.) | Relegation to 4. liga |

Rules for classification: 1) points; 2) goal difference; 3) number of goals scored.
(C) Champions; (P) Promoted; (R) Relegated

== Majstrovstvá regiónu Západ ==
=== League table ===
| Pos | Team | Pld | W | D | L | GF | GA | GD | Pts | Promotion or relegation |
|---|---|---|---|---|---|---|---|---|---|---|
| 1 | Piešťany (C, P) | 30 | 21 | 5 | 4 | 59 | 17 | +42 | 68 | Promotion to 3. liga |
| 2 | Levice (P) | 30 | 20 | 3 | 7 | 44 | 21 | +23 | 63 | Promotion to 3. liga |
| 3 | Považská Bystrica | 30 | 17 | 9 | 4 | 64 | 20 | +44 | 60 | |
| 4 | Komárno | 30 | 16 | 6 | 8 | 47 | 29 | +18 | 54 | |
| 5 | Skalica | 30 | 15 | 7 | 8 | 55 | 33 | +22 | 52 | |
| 6 | Veľké Ludince | 30 | 14 | 8 | 8 | 41 | 24 | +17 | 50 | |
| 7 | FC Horses Šúrovce | 30 | 14 | 4 | 12 | 46 | 33 | +13 | 46 | |
| 8 | Palárikovo | 30 | 12 | 4 | 14 | 39 | 56 | −17 | 40 | |
| 9 | Gabčíkovo | 30 | 11 | 6 | 13 | 24 | 36 | −12 | 39 | |
| 10 | Topolníky | 30 | 10 | 6 | 14 | 43 | 53 | −10 | 36 | |
| 11 | Galanta | 30 | 10 | 4 | 16 | 33 | 51 | −18 | 34 | |
| 12 | Domaniža | 30 | 8 | 8 | 14 | 34 | 58 | −24 | 32 | |
| 13 | Jaslovské Bohunice | 30 | 7 | 6 | 17 | 26 | 54 | −28 | 27 | |
| 14 | Bánovce nad Bebravou | 30 | 5 | 10 | 15 | 21 | 42 | −21 | 25 | |
| 15 | Nová Ves n/V | 30 | 4 | 10 | 16 | 18 | 41 | −23 | 22 | |
| 16 | Dunajská Streda B | 30 | 5 | 6 | 19 | 27 | 53 | −26 | 21 | Relegation to 4. liga |

Rules for classification: 1) points; 2) goal difference; 3) number of goals scored.
(C) Champions; (P) Promoted

== Majstrovstvá regiónu Stred ==
=== League table ===
| Pos | Team | Pld | W | D | L | GF | GA | GD | Pts | Promotion or relegation |
|---|---|---|---|---|---|---|---|---|---|---|
| 1 | Martin (C, P) | 30 | 24 | 4 | 2 | 93 | 21 | +72 | 76 | Promotion to 3. liga |
| 2 | Žilina B | 30 | 21 | 3 | 6 | 95 | 34 | +61 | 66 | |
| 3 | Kalinovo | 30 | 16 | 8 | 6 | 50 | 23 | +27 | 56 | |
| 4 | Tisovec | 30 | 17 | 4 | 9 | 51 | 28 | +23 | 55 | |
| 5 | Veľký Krtíš | 30 | 15 | 3 | 12 | 54 | 66 | −12 | 48 | |
| 6 | Závažná Poruba | 30 | 13 | 8 | 9 | 50 | 44 | +6 | 47 | |
| 7 | Kysucké Nové Mesto | 30 | 14 | 5 | 11 | 55 | 52 | +3 | 47 | |
| 8 | Ďanová | 30 | 14 | 4 | 12 | 52 | 46 | +6 | 46 | |
| 9 | Banská Bystrica | 30 | 13 | 5 | 12 | 58 | 50 | +8 | 44 | |
| 10 | Liptovská Štiavnica | 30 | 11 | 7 | 12 | 61 | 47 | +14 | 40 | |
| 11 | Čadca | 30 | 10 | 7 | 13 | 61 | 45 | +16 | 37 | |
| 12 | Nová Baňa | 30 | 12 | 1 | 17 | 50 | 60 | −10 | 37 | |
| 13 | Žiar nad Hronom | 30 | 10 | 5 | 15 | 49 | 64 | −15 | 35 | |
| 14 | Krásno nad Kysucou | 30 | 5 | 5 | 20 | 29 | 80 | −51 | 20 | |
| 15 | Turany | 30 | 4 | 3 | 23 | 24 | 98 | −74 | 15 | Relegation to 4. liga |
| 16 | Lietavská Lúčka | 30 | 4 | 2 | 24 | 25 | 99 | −74 | 14 | Relegation to 4. liga |

Rules for classification: 1) points; 2) goal difference; 3) number of goals scored.
(C) Champions; (P) Promoted

== Majstrovstvá regiónu Východ ==
=== Locations ===
Location of teams in Majstrovstvá regiónu Východ 2011–12

=== League table ===
| Pos | Team | Pld | W | D | L | GF | GA | GD | Pts | Promotion or relegation |
|---|---|---|---|---|---|---|---|---|---|---|
| 1 | Humenné (C, P) | 30 | 19 | 5 | 6 | 60 | 23 | +37 | 62 | Promotion to 3. liga |
| 2 | Haniska | 30 | 16 | 10 | 4 | 67 | 37 | +30 | 58 | |
| 3 | Svit | 30 | 17 | 4 | 9 | 46 | 35 | +11 | 55 | |
| 4 | Stropkov | 30 | 16 | 6 | 8 | 53 | 33 | +20 | 54 | |
| 5 | Vyšné Opátske | 30 | 15 | 4 | 11 | 58 | 45 | +13 | 49 | |
| 6 | Snina | 30 | 13 | 7 | 10 | 51 | 36 | +15 | 46 | |
| 7 | Giraltovce | 30 | 14 | 4 | 12 | 41 | 48 | −7 | 46 | |
| 8 | Svidník | 30 | 13 | 5 | 12 | 39 | 35 | +4 | 44 | |
| 9 | Michalovce B | 30 | 12 | 7 | 11 | 47 | 42 | +5 | 43 | |
| 10 | Bardejovská Nová Ves | 30 | 13 | 3 | 14 | 48 | 44 | +4 | 42 | |
| 11 | Spišské Podhradie | 30 | 11 | 8 | 11 | 49 | 48 | +1 | 41 | |
| 12 | Sabinov | 30 | 11 | 7 | 12 | 39 | 42 | −3 | 40 | |
| 13 | Barca | 30 | 11 | 6 | 13 | 41 | 45 | −4 | 39 | |
| 14 | Košice – Krásna | 30 | 10 | 4 | 16 | 32 | 52 | −20 | 34 | |
| 15 | Veľký Šariš | 30 | 4 | 4 | 22 | 39 | 87 | −48 | 16 | Relegation to 4. liga |
| 16 | Nižný Hrušov | 30 | 1 | 4 | 25 | 13 | 71 | −58 | 7 | Relegation to 4. liga |

Rules for classification: 1) points; 2) goal difference; 3) number of goals scored.
(C) Champions; (P) Promoted
