= 2012–13 3. Liga (Slovakia) =

3. Liga
- Season: 2012–13
- Promoted: Spartak Trnava juniori (West); FK Pohronie (East)
- Relegated: FC Nitra B (West); Tatran Prešov juniori (East); Spišská Nová Ves (East); Lučenec (East)

The 2012–13 3. Liga (Slovakia) season of the 3. Liga (also known as the Keno 10 3. liga for sponsorship reasons) was the 20th edition of third tier annual football competition in the Slovak league system, since its establishment in 1993.

32 teams were divided into two geographic groups each with 16 teams each that contested teams in their own group: 3. liga západ (Group West) and 3. liga východ (Group East).

== Keno 10 3. liga Západ ==
Changes from last season included:

=== Team changes ===
==== To Keno 10 3. liga Západ ====
Promoted from Majstrovstvá regiónu

- PFK Piešťany
- FK Slovan Levice
- LP Domino

Relegated from 2. liga

- FC Petržalka 1898

==== From 3. liga Západ ====
Promoted to 2. liga

- FK Slovan Duslo Šaľa
- FC ŠTK 1914 Šamorín

Not registered to 3. liga Západ

- PŠC Pezinok
- FK Púchov

=== Locations ===
Location of teams in Keno 10 3. liga západ 2012–13

=== League table ===
Pos	Team	Pld	W	D	L	GF	GA	GD	Pts	Promotion or relegation
1	Spartak Trnava juniori (P)	30	17	4	9	59	30	+29	55	Promotion to 2. liga
2	Slovan Bratislava juniori	30	15	5	10	55	40	+15	50	
3	Sereď	30	14	8	8	62	48	+14	50	
4	Levice	30	14	7	9	40	30	+10	49	
5	Piešťany	30	14	7	9	46	37	+9	49	
6	Topoľčany	30	14	4	12	51	51	0	46	
7	Nové Zámky	30	13	6	11	51	38	+13	45	
8	Vráble	30	12	8	10	47	47	0	44	
9	Dunajská Lužná	30	10	11	9	30	28	+2	41	
10	Nové Mesto nad Váhom	30	11	6	13	37	37	0	39	
11	Petržalka	30	10	6	14	30	43	−13	36	
12	Moravany nad Váhom	30	10	5	15	40	55	−15	35	
13	Nemšová	30	9	7	14	30	37	−7	34	
14	LP Domino	30	10	4	16	29	44	−15	34	
15	Vrbové	30	9	7	14	21	38	−17	34	
16	Nitra B (R)	30	8	5	17	27	52	−25	29	Relegation to Majstrovstvá regiónu

Rules for classification: 1) points; 2) goal difference; 3) number of goals scored.
(P) Promoted; (R) Relegated

== Keno 10 3. liga Východ ==
Changes from last season

=== Team changes ===
==== To Keno 10 3. liga Východ ====
Promoted from Majstrovstvá regiónu

- MŠK Fomat Martin
- ŠK Futura Humenné

Relegated from 2. liga

==== From 3. liga Východ ====
Promoted to 2. liga

- Partizán Bardejov
- TJ Baník Ružiná

Relegated to Majstrovstvá regiónu

- MFK Lokomotíva Zvolen
- MFK Goral Stará Ľubovňa

=== Locations ===
Location of teams in Keno 10 3. liga východ 2012–13

=== League table ===
Pos	Team	Pld	W	D	L	GF	GA	GD	Pts	Promotion or relegation
1	Pohronie (C, P)	30	19	3	8	50	24	+26	60	Promotion to 2. liga
2	Poprad	30	16	3	11	40	30	+10	51	
3	Lokomotíva Košice	30	12	11	7	37	30	+7	47	
4	Trebišov	30	13	6	11	52	46	+6	45	
5	Lipany	30	12	8	10	38	32	+6	44	
6	Námestovo	30	12	7	11	42	34	+8	43	
7	FK Moldava nad Bodvou	30	12	7	11	29	30	−1	43	
8	Banská Bystrica juniori	30	11	9	10	30	28	+2	42	
9	Košice B	30	12	6	12	47	51	−4	42	
10	Vranov nad Topľou	30	11	8	11	41	36	+5	41	
11	Kremnička	30	11	7	12	42	46	−4	40	
12	Humenné	30	11	6	13	42	40	+2	39	
13	Martin	30	11	5	14	40	51	−11	38	
14	Prešov juniori (R)	30	10	6	14	38	50	−12	36	Relegation to Majstrovstvá regiónu
15	Spišská Nová Ves (R)	30	9	5	16	37	47	−10	32	Relegation to Majstrovstvá regiónu
16	Lučenec (R)	30	9	1	20	25	55	−30	28	Relegation to Majstrovstvá regiónu

Rules for classification: 1) points; 2) goal difference; 3) number of goals scored.
(C) Champions; (P) Promoted; (R) Relegated
