= Jablonec =

Jablonec may refer to places:

== Czech Republic ==
- Jablonec nad Nisou, a city in the Liberec Region
  - FK Jablonec, an association football club
  - Jablonec nad Nisou District around the city
- Jablonec nad Jizerou, a town in the Liberec Region
- Jablonec, a village and part of Libčeves in the Ústí nad Labem Region

== Slovakia ==
- Jablonec, Pezinok District, a village in the Bratislava Region
- Gemerský Jablonec, a municipality and village in the Banská Bystrica Region
