= Marek Ujlaky (footballer, born 1974) =

Slovak footballer (born 1974)

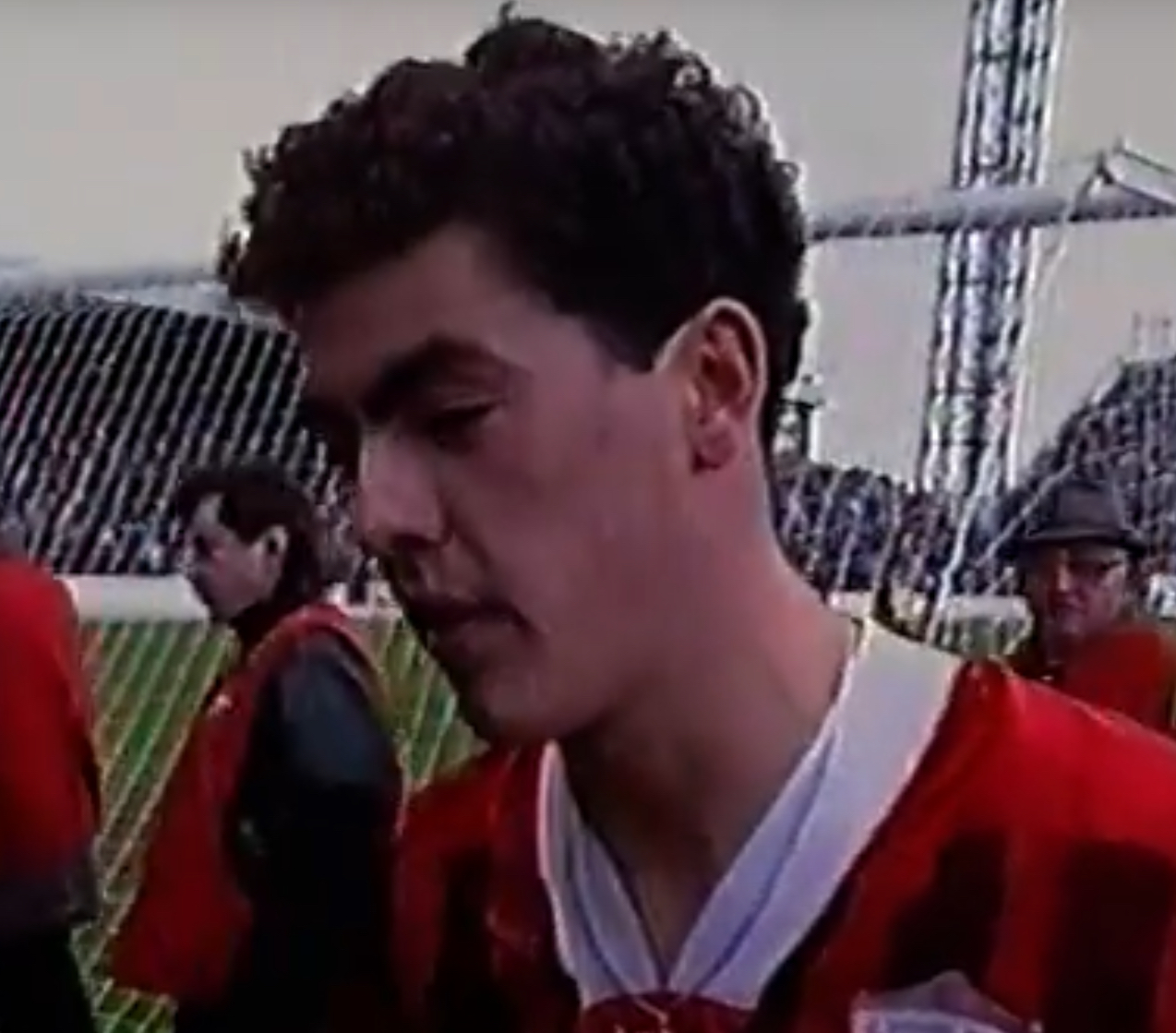
- Ujlaky in 1995

Personal information
- Date of birth: 26 March 1974 (age 52)
- Place of birth: Zeleneč, Czechoslovakia
- Height: 1.81 m (5 ft 11 in)
- Position: Attacking midfielder

Youth career
- 1982–1987: Slávia Zeleneč
- 1987–1991: Spartak Trnava

Senior career*
Years	Team	Apps	(Gls)
1991–2000	Spartak Trnava	240	(55)
2000–2001	Drnovice	15	(1)
2001	→ Spartak Trnava (loan)	16	(9)
2001	Slovan Bratislava	16	(2)
2002–2007	Spartak Trnava	127	(30)
2007	Senec	13	(3)
2008	ViOn Zlaté Moravce	23	(2)
2009	UFC Tadten	15	(3)
2009–2012	Horses Šúrovce		
Total		462	(105)

International career
1995–2001	Slovakia	40	(2)
- * Club domestic league appearances and goals

Marek Ujlaky (pronounced [mˈɛɹk ˈʌ.dʒl.æki]; born 26 March 1974) is a former Slovak footballer who played as a midfielder. He is best known for his time with Spartak Trnava, a team he spent the majority of his career with. He is the second top goal scorer in the club’s history.

Born in Zeleneč, Czechoslovakia, Ujlaky began his career with local club Slávia Zeleneč before joining Spartak Trnava, making his debut in 1991. With the club, he won one cup and one Super Cup before signing for Czech side FK Drnovice following Trnava's relegation. He later returned on loan to the club before joining rivals Slovan Bratislava. Following his stint at Slovan, Ujlaky re-joined Spartak Trnava, helping the club return to the first league. Later in his career, he had short spells with FC Senec in 2007, Zlaté Moravce in 2008, and lower-division clubs including UFC Tadten and FC Horses Šúrovce until his professional retirement in 2012.

At international level, Ujlaky made his debut for the Slovakia national team in 1995 and went on to earn 40 FIFA caps, scoring two goals, including one in a 4–1 UEFA Euro 1996 qualifying win over Poland in 1995 and another in a 4–0 friendly against Belarus in 1996. His international career, which spanned from 1995 to 2001, included participation in several World Cup and European Championship qualifiers, though Slovakia did not qualify for major tournaments during his tenure.

== Early life ==
Ujlaky was born on 26 March 1974 in Zeleneč, a municipality in the Trnava District. He started playing football at the age of eight at the local club Slávia Zeleneč. He stayed there until he was twelve, when he left to join the academy of Spartak Trnava.

== Club career ==
=== 1991–2000: First spell with Spartak Trnava ===
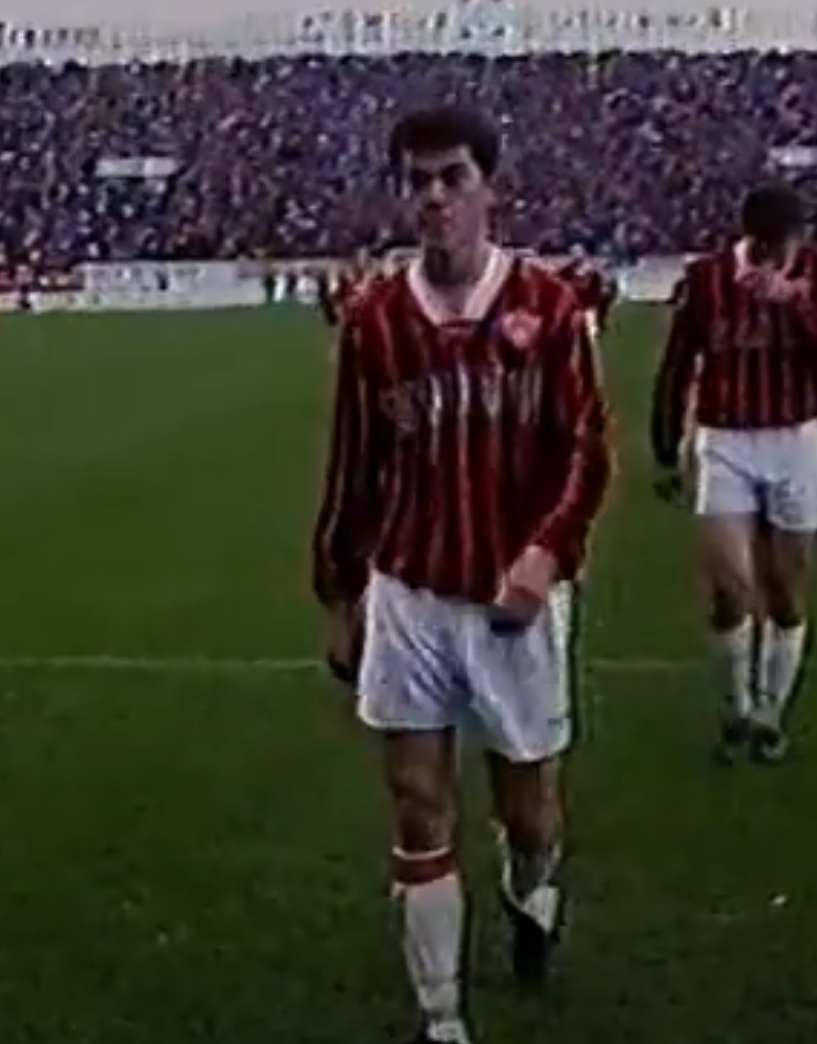
Ujlaky playing in the traditional derby in 1995

Ujlaky made his senior debut for Spartak Trnava on 19 October 1991 in the Slovak Cup quarter-finals, scoring the only goal for his side goal in a 2–1 defeat to Lokomotíva Košice. Later that year, he made his Czechoslovak First League debut at just 17 years old, making an appearance in a 2–1 home loss against Dynamo České Budějovice. He scored his first goal for the club in a 3–1 home loss to Tatran Presov in the spring of 1992. He scored the winning goal of a 1–0 victory over FK Dukla Banska Bystrica in the last round of the league, helping Trnava avoid relegation. In his debut season, he was the club's top goalscorer alongside Ján Solár with 4 goals in 20 appearances. In the 1993–94 season, he featured for the first time in the league's best eleven.

He was most prolific in the 1995–96 season, when he netted 10 league goals across the season. On 25 September 1995, Ujlaky scored four goals in a 5–2 home win against Tatran Presov, ending Tatran’s invincibility hopes. He became the 13th player in the league's history to score four goals in a single match. Ujlaky was a part of the squad that led the league after the autumn part of the season. He played in the 1996 Slovak Cup final, were Spartak would lose 2–1 against Chemlon Humenné in what was considered a shock result. He made his European debut the next season on 22 June 1996, featuring in a 3–0 victory over Čukarički Stankom in the Intertoto Cup, netting two goals. Later that season, he featured in a 4–0 league win against rivals and previous league winners Slovan Bratislava. He was a part of the Trnava squad that almost won the league in that season, when they lost out on the title to 1. FC Košice after losing 1–0 away against MŠK Rimavská Sobota in the final round of the season. At the end of the season, Ujlaky was the third top goal scorer in the league alongside teammate Július Šimon.

Ujlaky helped Spartak Trnava advance through Birkirkara F.C. 4–1 on aggregate in the first qualifying round of the 1997–98 UEFA Cup. In the second round, the team were drawn with Greek club PAOK FC. Ujlaky scored a brace in the first leg as Trnava led the game 3–0 at the half-hour mark. In the 31st minute, he was sent off for a handball in the penalty area after a corner kick, resulting in a penalty for PAOK, which they scored. The match ended in a 5–3 loss for Spartak Trnava. Following his performances in Europe, there was a reported interest from both PAOK and Olympiakos Piraeus to sign Ujlaky, however he was later convinced by the owners of Spartak to stay. He played in the 1998–99 Slovak Cup final against 1. FC Košice, where Trnava won 2–0, clenching their fifth domestic cup. He won his second trophy after achieving success in the Slovak Super Cup final, a match between the champion of the league and winner of the cup, once again beating Košice 3–1.

=== 2000–2001: Drnovice and Slovan Bratislava ===
In 2000, Ujlaky joined Czech First League club FK Drnovice for a reported fee of €250,000. He made his competitive debut in a 3–0 home win against FK Budućnost Banovići in the first round of the UEFA Cup, assisting the second goal scored by Marcel Cupák. He made his league debut on 30 July in a 3–1 home loss against Chmel Blšany. Ujlaky scored his first goal in a 2–1 home win against Bohemians Prague, scoring a free-kick in the 90th minute to secure Drnovice's first league win of the season. He played in the second round of the UEFA Cup against German side TSV 1860 Munich, where Drnovice would draw 0–0 at home in front of 20,000 spectators. Ujlaky did not feature in the second leg as his team lost 1–0 and were subsequently knocked out of the competition. In January 2001, Ujlaky trialled at Swiss club FC Lugano. During the 2000–01 season, he made 15 appearances and scored 1 goal for Drnovice in the league, where the team finished 7th. Ujlaky was then loaned out back to Trnava in February 2001, where in the spring part of the season, he was the 10th top goal scorer in the league, netting 9 goals in 16 appearances.

Following the relegation of Spartak Trnava at the end of the 2000–01 season, Ujlaky joined rivals ŠK Slovan Bratislava in July 2001, signing a two and a half year contract. It was reported that Ferencváros Budapest, FC Lugano and Slovak champions Inter Bratislava were also interested in signing him. In the first half of the 2001–02 season, he played in 16 matches and scored two goals for Slovan.

At that time, Spartak was not going through the best of times, as it had been relegated to the second league, so I chose the Slovan team from several offers. I spent half a season in the blue team, which I would rather describe as a kind of football adventure. Considering that Trnava was playing in a lower league at the time, no one blamed me for my Bratislava commitment, and after half a year I returned and again wore the jersey of my club.

— Ujlaky later describing his transfer to Slovan Bratislava

=== 2002–2007: Return to Spartak Trnava ===
In February 2002, Ujlaky rejoined Spartak Trnava after his unsuccessful spell with Slovan Bratislava. That season, Trnava won the 2. Liga and were promoted back to the first division. The following season, he helped Trnava reach 4th place, qualifying for the 2003 Intertoto Cup. Ujlaky scored the equalizing goal in a 2–2 home draw against Slaven Koprivnica in the 3rd round of the 2004 Intertoto Cup, where Spartak were knocked out of the competition on the away goals rule. In April 2006, Ujlaky was injured in a match against FC Nitra after a tackle from Peter Dobiáš. The incident, which occurred in the 78th minute, required immediate surgery, which sidelined him for the remainder of the 2005–06 season, with full recovery not being expected until August or September of 2006 after months of rehabilitation. Spartak Trnava filed a criminal complaint against Dobiáš, describing the challenge as intentional, though the player himself later stated he did not believe it was malicious. The Slovak Football Association's disciplinary committee subsequently banned Dobiáš for eight matches. Despite not playing any games for the rest of the season, Ujlaky was featured in the league's best 11 for the seventh time since 1995. He made his first appearance after the six-and-a-half month break in a 2–0 win over FC Nitra, scoring in the 29th minute of the game. Due bad results of the team near the end of the 2006–07 season, Ujlaky was dropped from the main line-up. On 7 May 2007, following a league defeat to ViOn Zlaté Moravce, he was sacked from the club.

=== Later career ===
Ujlaky trialled at Austrian club Admira Wacker during the summer preparations for the 2007–08 season, but would not join following disagreements with the club's new head coach. He was later supposed to trial at Scottish club Dundee United, but instead opted to join fellow league outfit FC Senec. He scored the winning goal in a 2–1 victory over Spartak Dubnica on 23 November 2007, helping Senec to their second win of the season. In December 2007, it was reported that Ujlaky would return to Spartak Trnava after half a year. Later that month, he went back on trial at Admira Wacker where he played in two friendly matches against FC Nitra and Spartak Trnava. On 17 January 2008, it was announced that he would be joining FC ViOn Zlaté Moravce. His time at ViOn was affected by injuries, leading him to make 23 appearances across the year where he scored twice. In 2009, Ujlaky briefly played abroad with UFC Tadten. Later that year, he returned to Slovakia to join FC Horses Šúrovce in the third division, where he continued playing until retiring in 2012, when he became the club's manager.

== Post-retirement ==
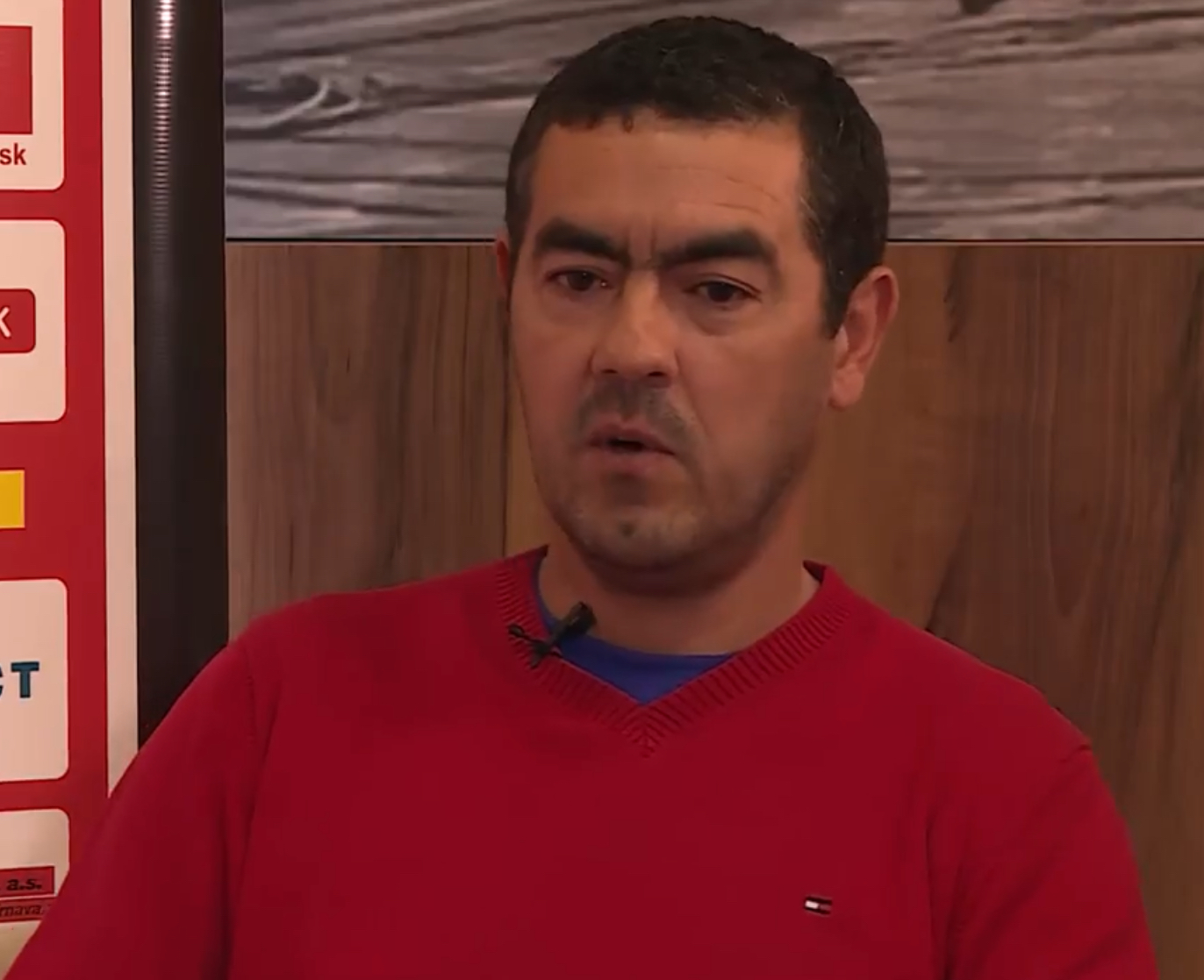
Ujlaky being interviewed in 2016

After retiring from professional football in the summer of 2009, he became a scout for Spartak Trnava, working together with other former Trnava players Igor Bališ and Jozef Adamec. Ujlaky later played for amateur side ŠK Slávia Zeleneč in the 6th tier of Slovak football. He scored ten goals in the autumn part of the season, helping the team have the second best attack in the competition. Between 2012 and 2013, Ujlaky briefly pursued coaching roles, serving as an assistant to the youth team categories of Spartak Trnava. In 2015, he became assistant manager to Peter Zelenský of the Spartak Trnava B team in the Slovak 2. Liga. He finished his active career in June 2019 with a farewell match, where he left the pitch in the 44th minute on a bicycle gifted by Slávia Zeleneč.

== International career ==
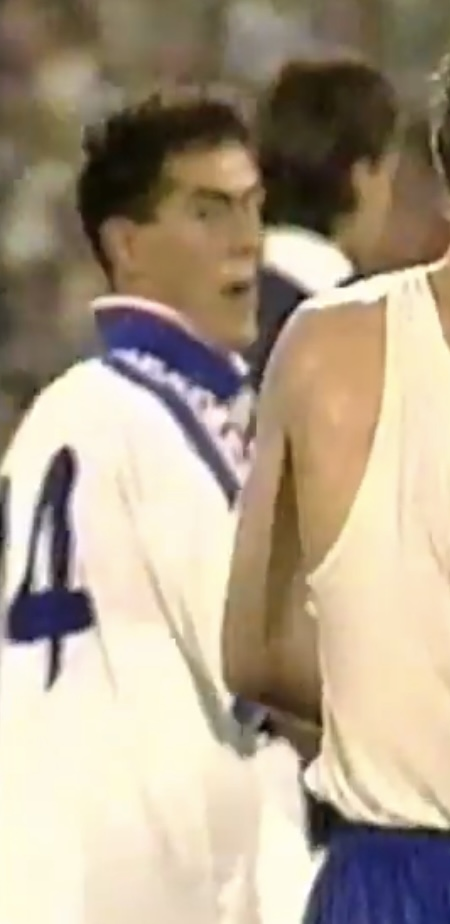
Ujlaky with Slovakia in 1997

Ujlaky made his debut for the Slovak national team on February 22, 1995, in a 5–0 friendly defeat to Brazil. He scored his first international goal for Slovakia on 11 October 1995, in a UEFA Euro 1996 qualifying match against Poland at Tehelné pole in Bratislava. Coming on as a substitute, he scored the third goal in the 78th minute, helping Slovakia win 4–1. Slovakia attempted to qualify for a major championship as an independent team for the first time in the 1996 qualifying, but finished third in their group, behind Romania and France. His second and final international goal came on 27 March 1996 in a friendly against Belarus, where Slovakia won 4–0. Ujlaky was a part of the squad during the UEFA Euro 2000 qualifiers, where he featured in two matches, a 3–0 home win over Azerbaijan on 5 September 1998, and a 2–0 victory against Liechtenstein on 8 September 1999, but Slovakia ended third behind Portugal and Romania, failing to advance. He also featured in early 2002 FIFA World Cup qualifiers, starting in the 2–0 home win over North Macedonia on 3 September 2000, and a 3–1 victory against Azerbaijan on 28 March 2001.

During his international career, Ujlaky played in the qualifiers for Euro 96, the 1998 World Cup, and Euro 2000. From 1995 to 2001, he played 40 matches for the national team, scoring two goals.

== Personal life ==
Ujlaky has a son, also named Marek, who is also a footballer. He currently plays for Spartak Trnava, graduating from the club’s academy and debuting in 2021. Ujlaky also has a cousin, Erik, who played for Spartak Trnava in his youth and was a regular starter for DAC Dunajská Streda.

== Career statistics ==
=== Club ===
Club performance			League		Cup		Continental		Total	
Season	Club	League	Apps	Goals	Apps	Goals	Apps	Goals	Apps	Goals
Czechoslovakia			League		Slovak Cup		Europe		Total	
1991–92	Spartak Trnava	Czechoslovak First League	20	4			—		20	4
1992–93	Spartak Trnava	Czechoslovak First League	24	3			—		24	3
Slovakia			League		Slovak Cup				Total	
1993–94	Spartak Trnava	Slovak First Football League	26	1			—		26	1
1994–95	Spartak Trnava	Slovak First Football League	30	6			—		30	6
1995–96	Spartak Trnava	Slovak First Football League	30	10			—		30	10
1996–97	Spartak Trnava	Slovak First Football League	28	6			—		28	6
1997–98	Spartak Trnava	Slovak First Football League	29	11			—		29	11
1998–99	Spartak Trnava	Slovak First Football League	26	8			—		26	8
1999–00	Spartak Trnava	Slovak First Football League	26	8			—		26	8
Czech Republic			League		Czech Cup		Europe		Total	
2000–01	FK Drnovice	Czech First League	15	1			—		15	1
Slovakia			League		Slovak Cup		Europe		Total	
2000–01	Spartak Trnava	Slovak First Football League	16	9			—		16	9
2001–02	Slovan Bratislava	Slovak First Football League	16	2			—		16	2
2001–02	Spartak Trnava	Slovak 2. Liga	11	7			—		11	7
2002–03	Spartak Trnava	Slovak First Football League	22	4			—		22	4
2003–04	Spartak Trnava	Slovak First Football League	28	9			—		28	9
2004–05	Spartak Trnava	Slovak First Football League	29	2			—		29	2
2005–06	Spartak Trnava	Slovak First Football League	22	4			—		22	4
2006–07	Spartak Trnava	Slovak First Football League	14	3			—		14	3
2007–08	FC Senec	Slovak First Football League	13	3			—		13	3
2007–08	FC ViOn Zlaté Moravce	Slovak First Football League	12	1			—		12	1
2008–09	FC ViOn Zlaté Moravce	Slovak First Football League	11	1			—		11	1
2008–09	UFC Tadten	Burgenland Liga	15	3			—		15	3
Total	Czechoslovakia		42	7					42	7
Total	Slovakia		390	94					390	94
Total	Czech Republic		15	1					15	1
Career total			462	105					462	105

=== International ===
Appearances and goals by national team and year
National team	Year	Apps	Goals
Slovakia	1995	6 (Note: Including 2 non-FIFA matches)	1
Slovakia	1996	8	1
Slovakia	1997	5	0
Slovakia	1998	7	0
Slovakia	1999	8	0
Slovakia	2000	8	0
Slovakia	2001	2	0
Total		42	2

Scores and results list Slovakia's goal tally first, score column indicates score after each Ujlaky goal.

List of international goals scored by Marek Ujlaky
No.	Date	Venue	Opponent	Score	Result	Competition	Ref.
1	11 October 1995	Tehelné pole, Slovakia	Poland	3–1	4–1	UEFA Euro 1996 qualifying	
2	27 March 1996	Štadión pod Zoborom, Slovakia	Belarus	2–0	4–0	Friendly	

== Honours ==
Spartak Trnava

- Slovak Cup: 1998–99
- Slovak Super Cup: 1998
- Slovak 2. Liga: 2001–02

Individual

- Slovak First Football League Best XI: 1994, 1995, 1996, 1997, 1998, 1999, 2005–2006
