= 2010–11 Slovak Second League =

2. liga
- Season: 2010–11

The 2010–11 Slovak Second League season of the 2. Liga (previously called Slovak Second League) was the 18th edition of the third tier football league in Slovakia, governed by since its establishment in 1993. 32 teams were geographically divided into two groups of 16 teams each to contest teams within their own group: 2. liga západ (West League) and 2. liga východ (East League).

From the next season this league was renamed Slovak Third Football League (3. liga).

== 2. liga západ ==
=== Team changes from 2009–10 ===
- Promoted in 1. liga: ↑Senec↑
- Relegated from 1. liga: ↓Prievidza×↓
- Promoted in 2. liga: ↑Pezinok↑, ↑Šamorín↑
- Relegated from 2. liga: ↓Dunajská Streda ↓

× - withdrew from league

=== Locations ===
Location of teams in 2. liga západ 2010–11

=== League table ===
Pos	Team	Pld	W	D	L	GF	GA	GD	Pts	Promotion or relegation
1	Myjava (P)	30	20	7	3	63	14	+49	67	Promotion to 2. liga
2	Nemšová	30	17	7	6	52	23	+29	58	
3	Vráble	30	16	4	10	37	36	+1	52	
4	Nové Mesto nad Váhom	30	15	6	9	55	33	+22	51	
5	FC Nitra B	30	15	2	13	51	45	+6	47	
6	ŠK Slovan Bratislava B	30	13	7	10	45	32	+13	46	
7	Vrbové	30	13	6	11	38	39	−1	45	
8	FC Spartak Trnava B	30	12	5	13	47	42	+5	41	
9	Topoľčany	30	10	7	13	36	46	−10	37	
10	Nové Zámky	30	10	7	13	37	47	−10	37	
11	Moravany	30	10	7	13	31	51	−20	37	
12	Pezinok	30	10	6	14	33	43	−10	36	
13	Šamorín	30	9	8	13	45	39	+6	35	
14	Rača (R)	30	7	9	14	32	56	−24	30	Relegation to Majstrovstvá regiónu
15	Jaslovské Bohunice (R)	30	7	6	17	35	64	−29	27	Relegation to Majstrovstvá regiónu
16	Bernolákovo (R)	30	7	4	19	31	58	−27	25	Relegation to Majstrovstvá regiónu

Source: soccerway.com
Rules for classification: 1) points; 2) goal difference; 3) number of goals scored.
(P) Promoted; (R) Relegated

== 2. liga východ ==
=== Team changes from 2009–10 ===
- Promoted in 1. liga: ↑Moldava nad Bodvou↑
- Relegated from 1. liga: ↓Podbrezová×↓
- Promoted in 2. liga: ↑Bardejov↑, ↑Ružiná↑, ↑Dolná Ždaňa↑
- Relegated from 2. liga: ↓Banská Bystrica↓, ↓Čadca↓

× - withdrew from league

=== Locations ===
Location of teams in 2. liga východ 2010–11

=== League table ===
Pos	Team	Pld	W	D	L	GF	GA	GD	Pts	Promotion or relegation
1	Podbrezová (P)	30	20	4	6	49	15	+34	64	Promotion to 2. liga
2	Bardejov	30	19	5	6	50	27	+23	62	
3	Ružiná	30	15	8	7	62	43	+19	53	
4	Spišská Nová Ves	30	16	5	9	50	38	+12	53	
5	Poprad	30	13	5	12	40	38	+2	44	
6	MŠK Žilina B (R)	30	12	8	10	41	41	0	44	Relegation to Majstrovstvá regiónu (Note: Withdrew from the league)
7	Dolná Ždaňa	30	13	4	13	46	39	+7	43	
8	Tatran Prešov juniori	30	13	4	13	49	44	+5	43	
9	Lipany	30	12	6	12	33	25	+8	42	
10	Banská Bystrica juniori	30	10	10	10	41	36	+5	40	
11	Vranov nad Topľou	30	10	6	14	43	46	−3	36	
12	MFK Košice B	30	10	6	14	38	47	−9	36	
13	Zvolen	30	10	3	17	29	41	−12	33	
14	Trebišov	30	9	5	16	26	41	−15	32	
15	Stará Ľubovňa	30	8	5	17	20	60	−40	29	
16	Humenné (R)	30	6	4	20	21	57	−36	22	Relegation to Majstrovstvá regiónu

Source: soccerway.com
Rules for classification: 1) points; 2) goal difference; 3) number of goals scored.
(P) Promoted; (R) Relegated
