= Church of the Assumption of the Virgin Mary, Plavecký Štvrtok =

Church in Slovakia

Coordinates: 48°22′28.19″N 16°59′57.42″E

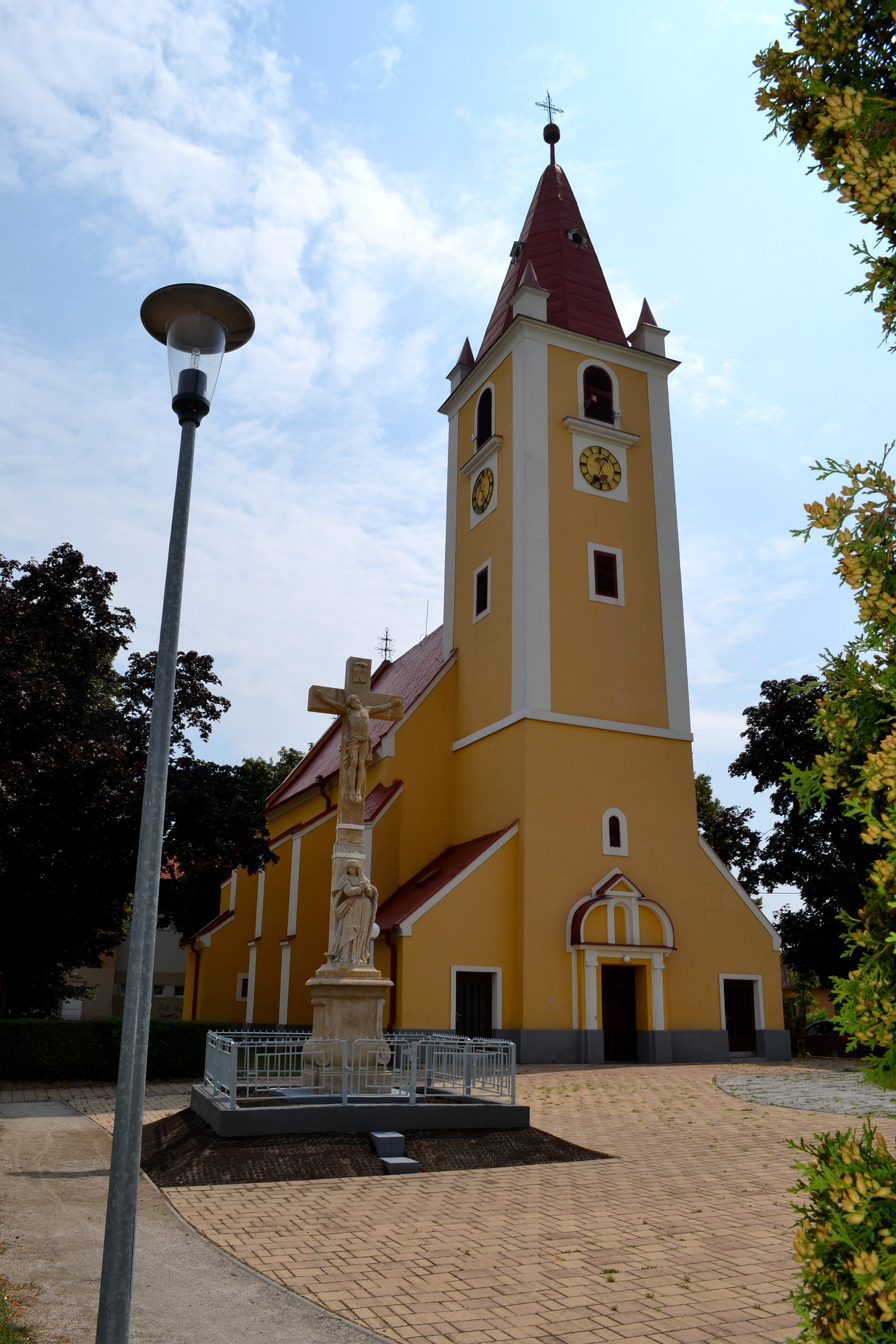
Church of the Assumption of the Virgin Mary

The Church of the Assumption of the Virgin Mary is a Roman Catholic Church in Plavecký Štvrtok from the first half of the 14th century, and reconstructed in the 17th and the 19th century. In the church park there are three limestone statues created in different time periods.

The church was built in the 14th century. It is mentioned in a document at the donation of the village in 1333. It was built in Gothic style. It was vaulted in the 17th century, the roof was also repaired. Only the front side remained in Gothic style. Another reconstruction was done in 1922 along with installing new bells. On November 11, 1922, the reconstructed church was consecrated - since then the winter festival is held. A new organ was installed on December 17, 1925, the tower's roof was covered with sheet metal in 1933. The rectory was built in 1787.

There are some statues in front of the church. The most valuable is the statue of the cross with Jesus Christ and Virgin Mary created by a French sculptor in 1793. In 1908, a statue of Holy Trinity was built from a collection of our countrymen in America. The 3rd memorial is the memorial of killed soldiers in World War I. It was created by a stonemason - sculptor Weinberger from Stupava in 1932.

== Gallery ==
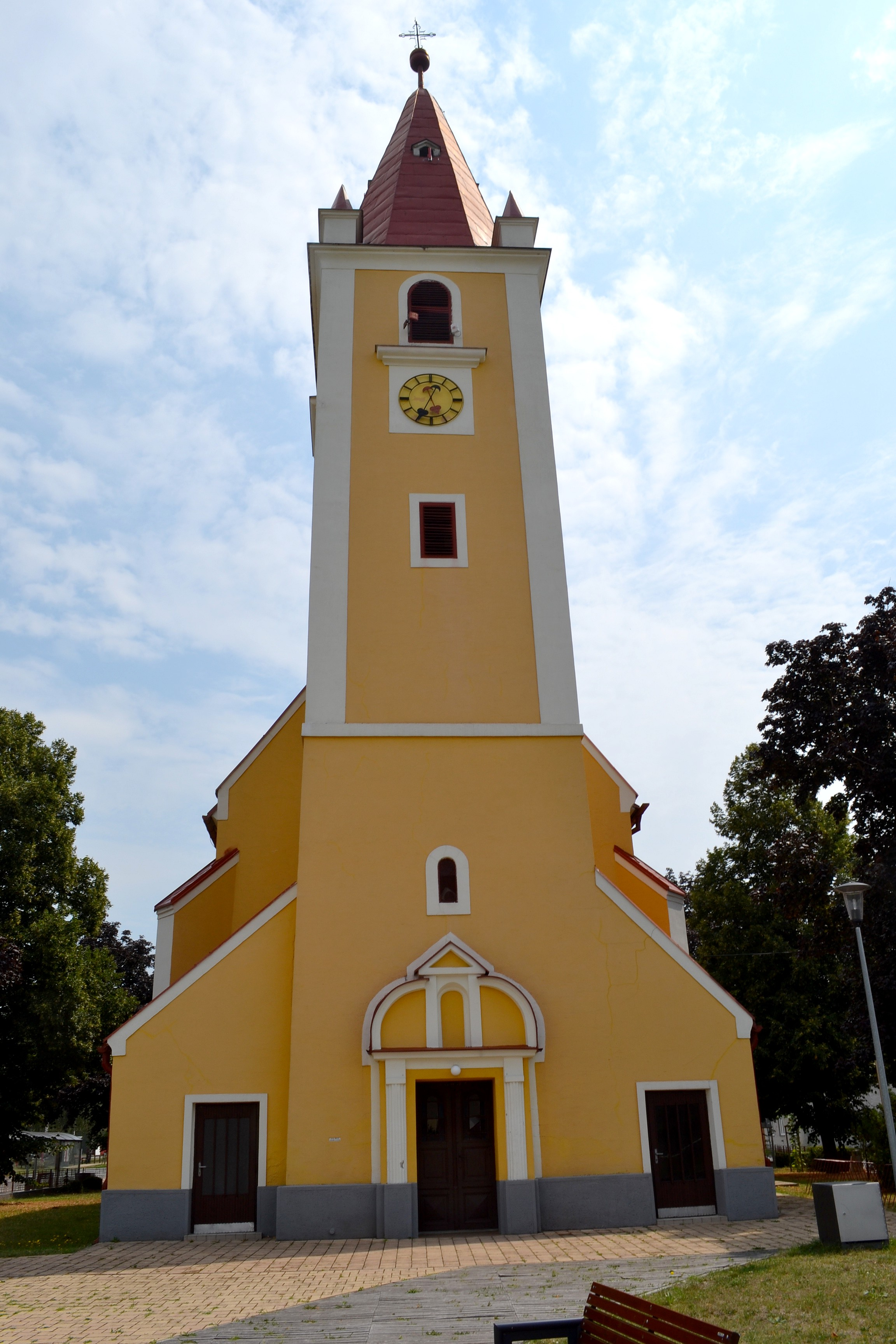

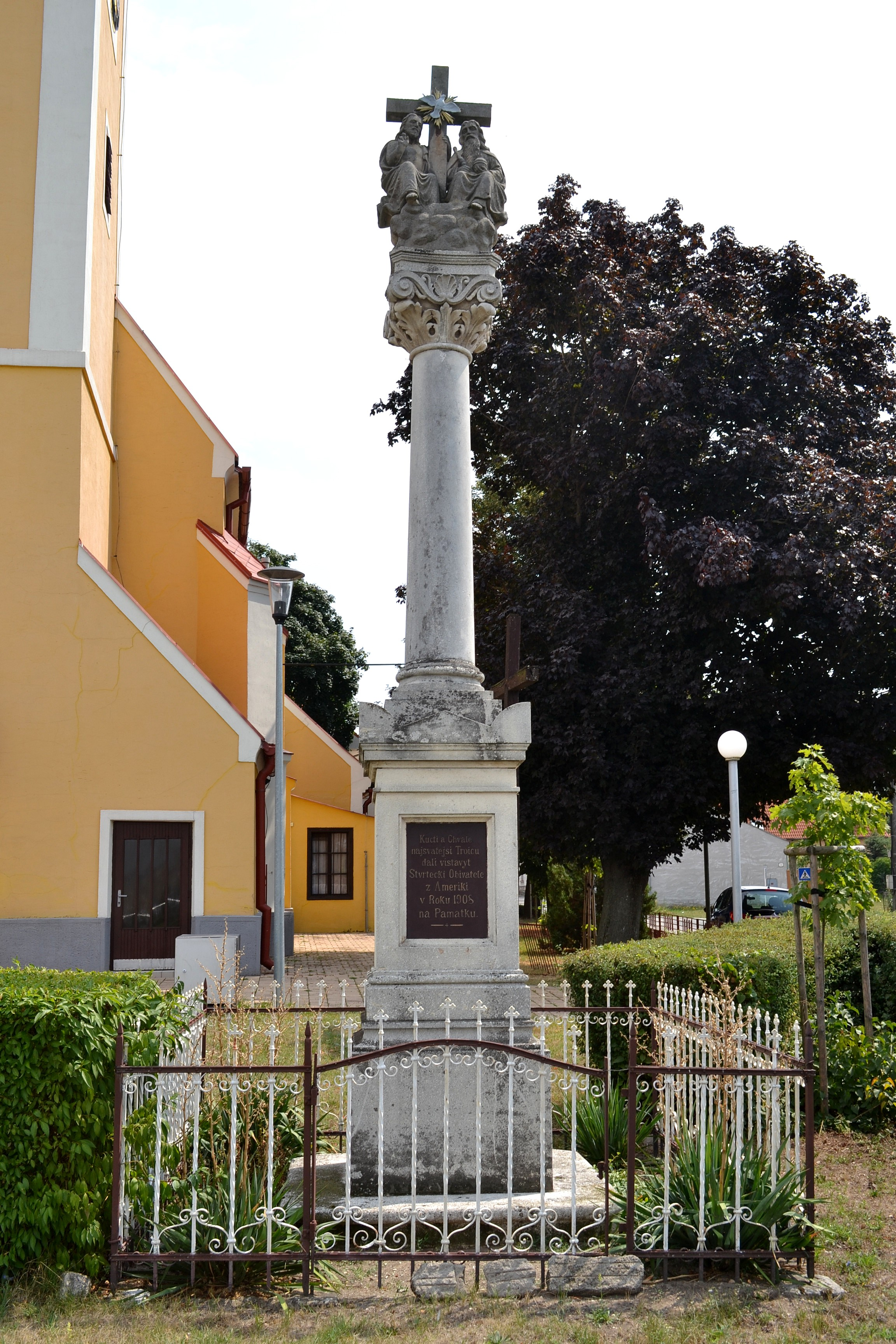

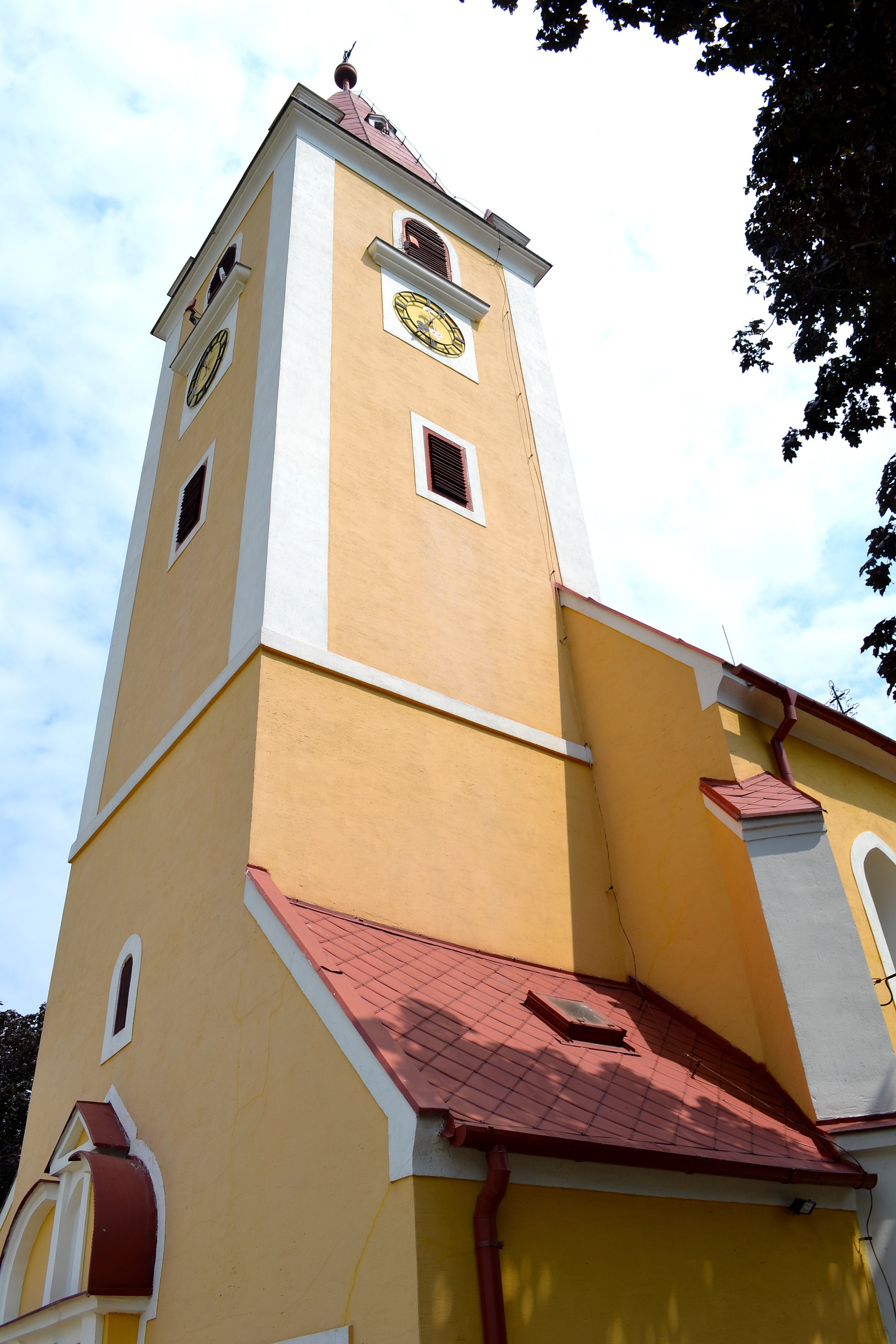

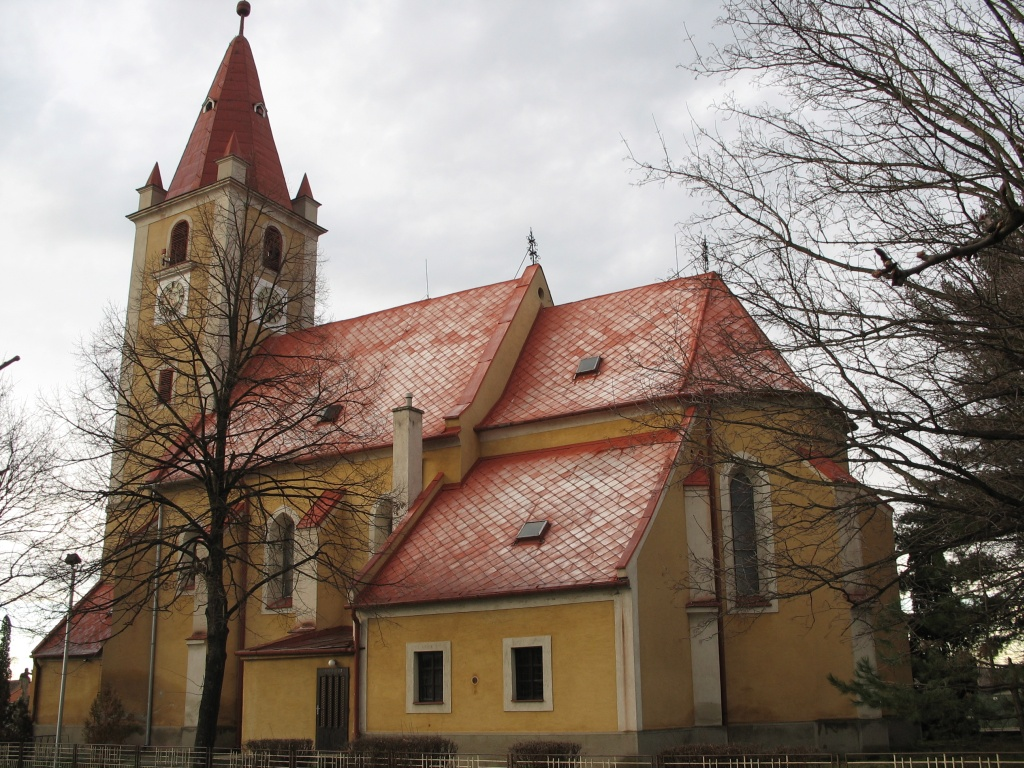

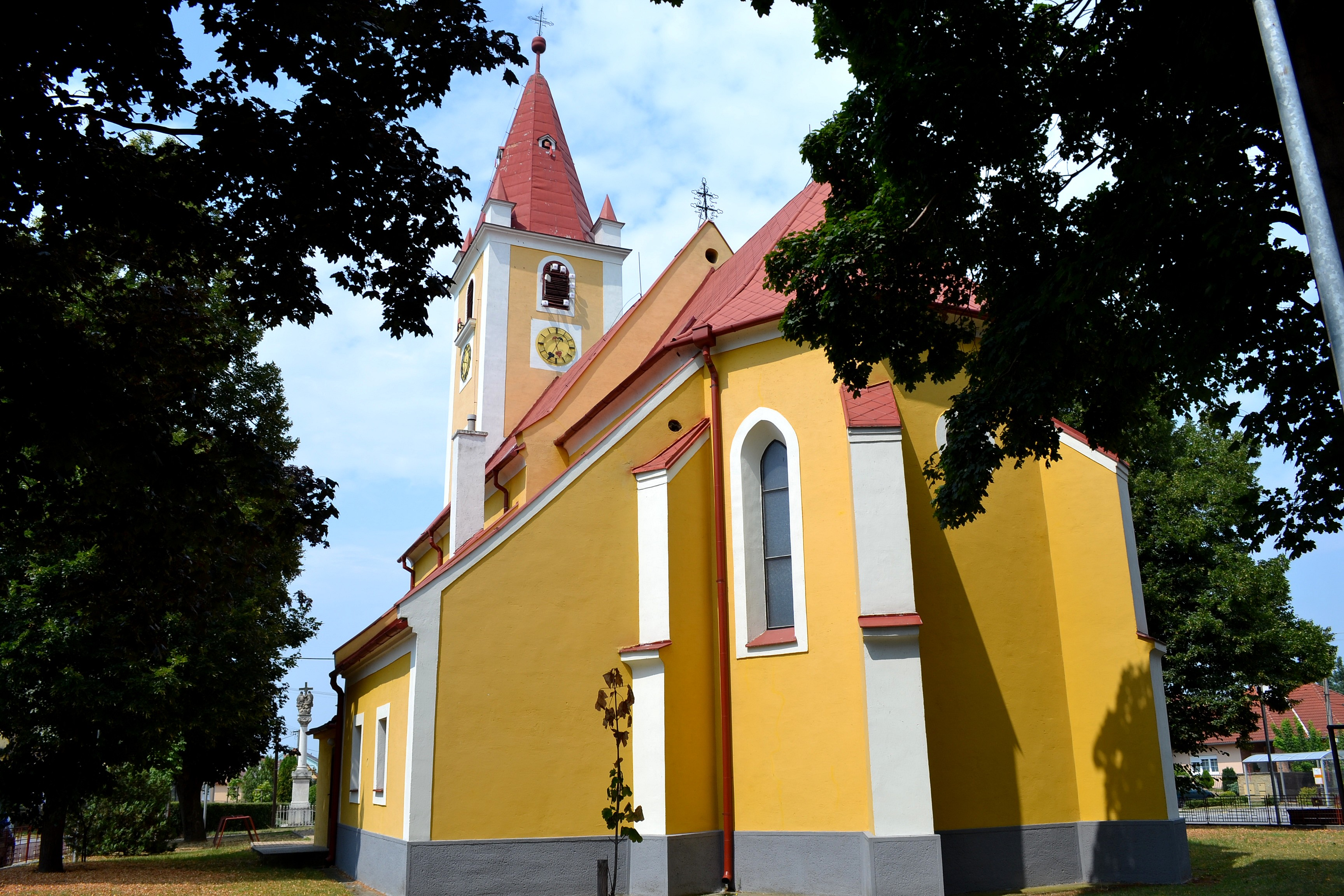

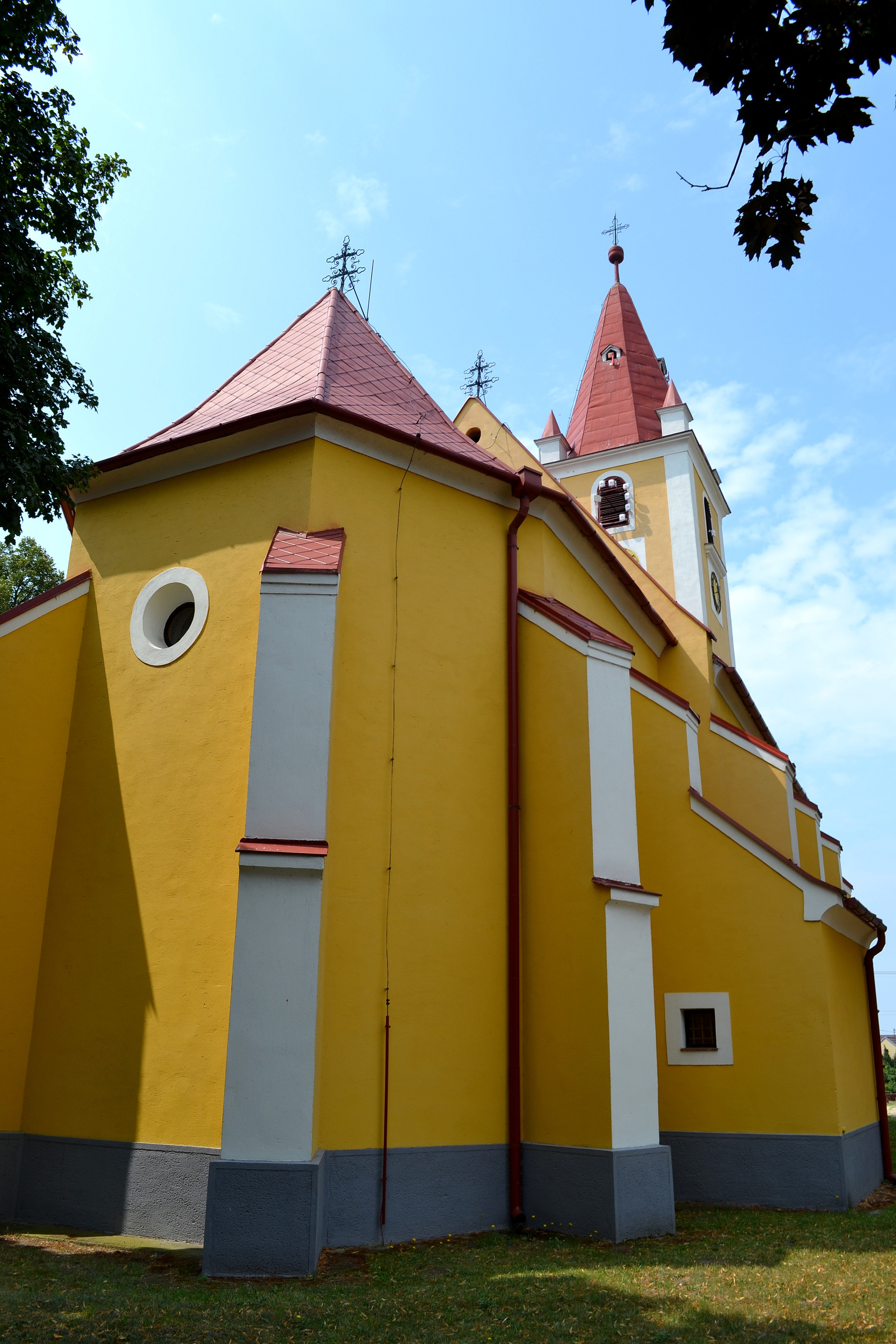

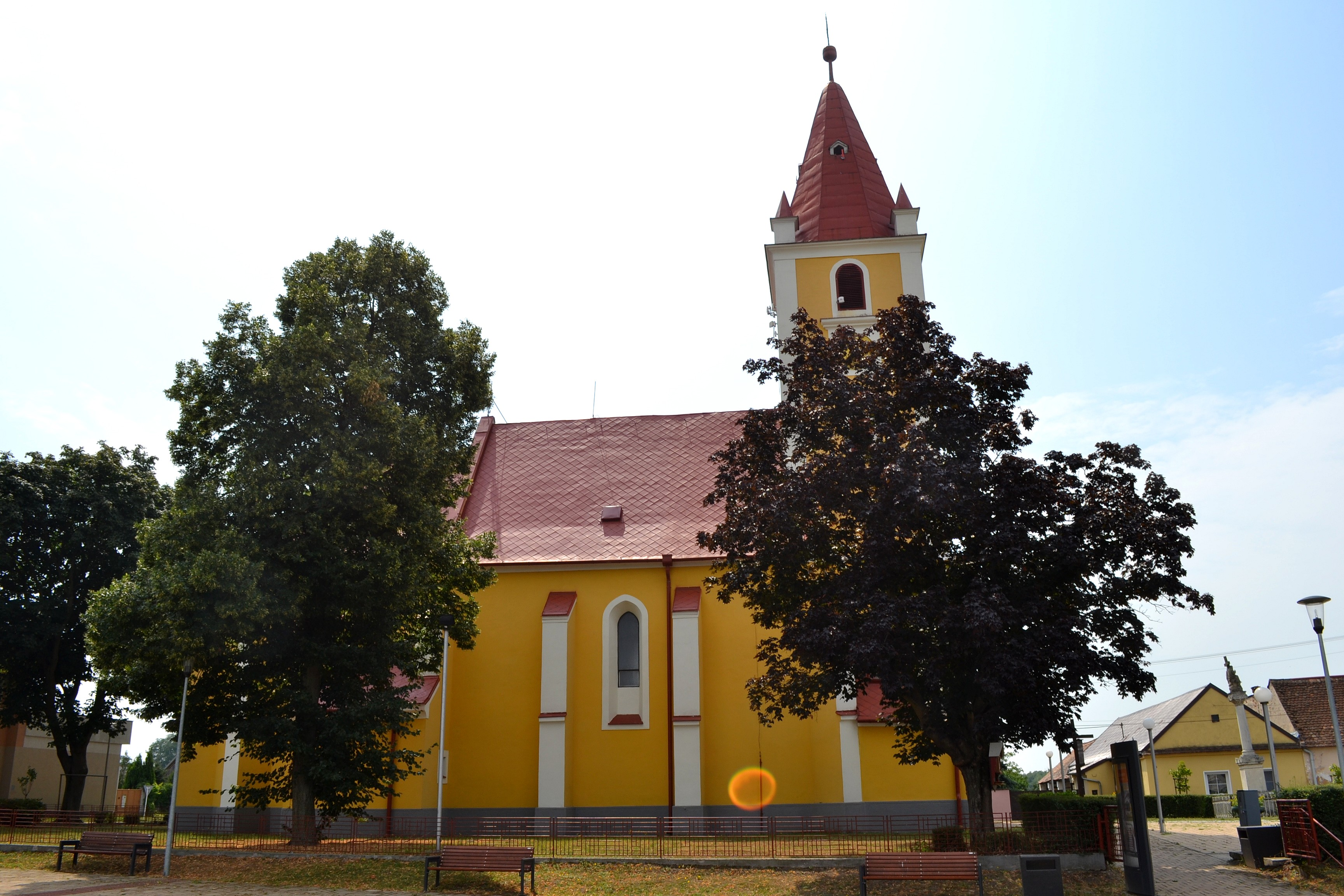
