= TJ Družstevník Ďanová =

Slovak football club

- Full name: TJ Družstevník Ďanová
- Ground: Štadión TJ Družstevník Ďanová, Ďanová
- League: Slovak Third League
- 2010–11: 1st (promoted from 4.liga middle-north

TJ Družstevník Ďanová is a Slovak football team, based in the town of Ďanová.
