= Matej Šavol =

Slovak footballer (born 1984)

Personal information
- Date of birth: 14 April 1984 (age 42)
- Place of birth: Ružomberok, Czechoslovakia
- Height: 1.85 m (6 ft 1 in)
- Position: Goalkeeper

Youth career
- Ružomberok

Senior career*
Years	Team	Apps	(Gls)
–2008	Ružomberok	7	(0)
2008–2009	Most	11	(0)
2010–	Liptovský Mikuláš	108	(0)
2014–2016	→ Ružomberok (loan)	16	(0)
2018–2019	Liptovský Silace		
2019–2021	Besenova		
- * Club domestic league appearances and goals as of 30 December 2014

Matej Šavol (born 14 April 1984) is a former Slovak football goalkeeper. He is most known for playing with MFK Tatran Liptovský Mikuláš.

== Club career ==
He first became known when representing MFK Ružomberok's B team in the 2006–07 Slovak Cup, where they faced major team Spartak Trnava, and managed to eliminate them in a penalty shootout after Šavol saved all four Spartak penalties. In 2008, he transferred to Czech team FK SIAD Most. He was the only Slovak player in a team of 8 different nationalities.

In 2013, he came third in MFK Tatran Liptovský Mikuláš' Player of the Year ranking.

In 2014, Šavol trained MFK Ružomberok, and was looking to be favoured ahead of Ján Malec. He made his Slovak First Football League debut on loan at Ružomberok in a 2–1 defeat against ŠK Slovan Bratislava. Following a one-year loan, his contract was extended.

He was later on the technical staff of MFK Ružomberok.
