= FK Fatran Dolná Tižina =

Slovak football club

- Full name: Football club Fatran Dolná Tižina
- Founded: 2000
- Ground: Stadium FK Fatran, Dolná Tižina, Slovakia
- Chairman: Michal Bela
- Manager: Ján Labant
- League: Majstrovstvá regiónu
- 2011–12: 4. liga, 2nd (promoted)

FK Fatran Dolná Tižina is a Slovak association football club located in Dolná Tižina. It currently plays in Majstrovstvá regiónu.

== Colors and badge ==
Its colors are blue and white or yellow-white.
