= Dolná Tižina =

Village and municipality in Slovakia

- Municipality
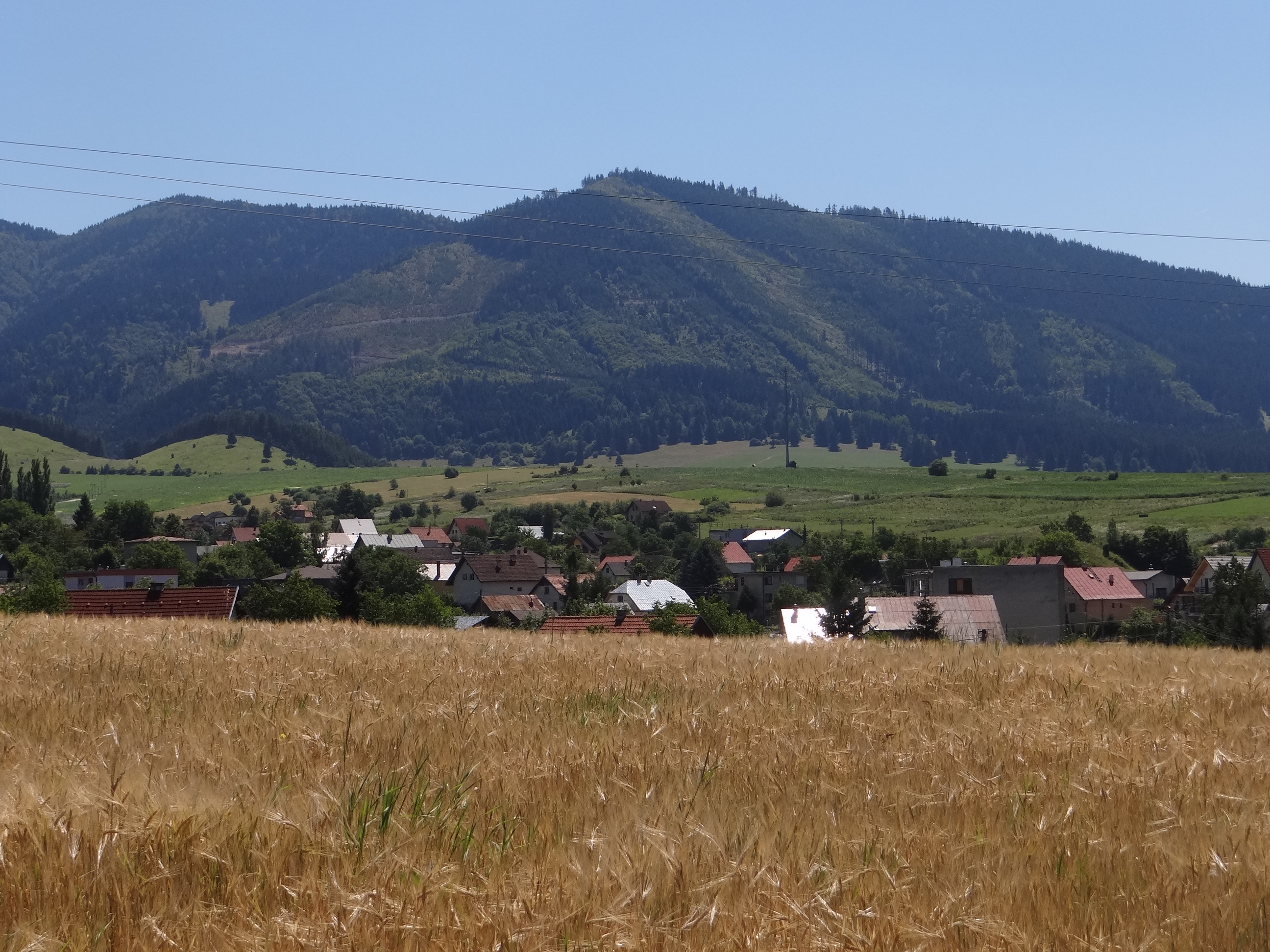

- Flag

- Location of Dolná Tižina in the Žilina Region Location of Dolná Tižina in Slovakia
- Coordinates: 49.22°N 18.92°E
- Country: Slovakia
- Region: Žilina Region
- District: Žilina District
- First mentioned: 1439

Area
  - Total: 13.11 km^{2} (5.06 sq mi)
- Elevation: 442 m (1,450 ft)

Population (2025)
  - Total: 1,530
- Time zone: UTC+1 (CET)
  - Summer (DST): UTC+2 (CEST)
- Postal code: 130 4
- Area code: +421 41
- Vehicle registration plate (until 2022): ZA
- Website: www.obecdolnatizina.sk

Dolná Tižina (Hungarian: Alsótizsény) is a village and municipality in Žilina District in the Žilina Region of northern Slovakia.

== History ==
In historical records the village was first mentioned in 1439.

== Geography ==
The municipality lies at an altitude of 442 metres (1,450 ft) and covers an area of 13.11 km^{2} (5.06 sq mi) (2025).

== Population ==
Population statistic (10 years)
Year	1995	2005	2015	2025
Count	1203	1232	1343	1530
Difference		+2.41%	+9.00%	+13.92%

Population statistic
Year	2024	2025
Count	1510	1530
Difference		+1.32%

It has a population of 1530 people (31 December 2025).

=== Ethnicity ===
Census 2021 (1+ %)
Ethnicity	Number	Fraction
Slovak	1445	99.24%
Total	1456	

In year 2021 was 1456 people by ethnicity 1445 as Slovak, 13 as Not found out, 6 as Other, 4 as Czech, 2 as Rusyn, 1 as Ukrainian, 1 as Russian, 1 as Polish and 1 as German.

Note on population: The difference values of population numbers in the table "Population statistic" and in the sections "Ethnicity" & "Religion" is caused by the use of various statistical methods.

=== Religion ===
Census 2021 (1+ %)
Religion	Number	Fraction
Roman Catholic Church	1302	89.42%
None	119	8.17%
Total	1456	

In year 2021 was 1456 people by religion 1302 from Roman Catholic Church, 119 from None, 8 from Not found out, 5 from Other, 5 from Greek Catholic Church, 5 from Evangelical Church, 3 from Old Catholic Church, 3 from Eastern Orthodox Church, 2 from Ad hoc movements, 1 from Paganism and natural spirituality, 1 from Christian Congregations in Slovakia, 1 from Islam and 1 from Buddhism.

== Genealogical resources ==
The records for genealogical research are available at the state archive "Statny Archiv in Bytca, Slovakia"

- Roman Catholic church records (births/marriages/deaths): 1686-1896 (parish A)

== See also ==
- List of municipalities and towns in Slovakia
