= SDM Domino =

Slovak football club

- Full name: SDM Domino Bratislava
- Founded: 1993
- Ground: Stadium Trnávka, Ružinov
- Chairman: Peter Kvašňovský
- Manager: Kevin Absolon
- League: 4. liga
- 2023–24: 4. liga-Bratislava, 15th
- Website: https://www.sdmdomino.sk/
Home colours	Away colours

SDM Domino Bratislava is a Slovak football team, based in the town of Ružinov. The club was founded in 1993.

== History ==
LP Domino former name SDM (Community children and youth Domino) is a civic association, which through various activities, especially sports and facilitate the development of children and youth. For more than 10 years is an essential part of his work became a youth football club, which operates about 280 boys in 10 youth and two senior teams. LP Domino is a part of the Salesian Youth Centre, which operates in the Roman Catholic parish of Saint John Bosco in Bratislava – Trnávka (Ružinov). The club is currently playing in 3. liga (III. level). Last season, LP Domino finished in 3rd place (Majstrovstvá regiónu), but winner ŠFK Prenaks Jablonec and runners-up ŠK Plavecký Štvrtok rejected to promotion and so promoted LP Domino.
