= Ďanová =

- Municipality
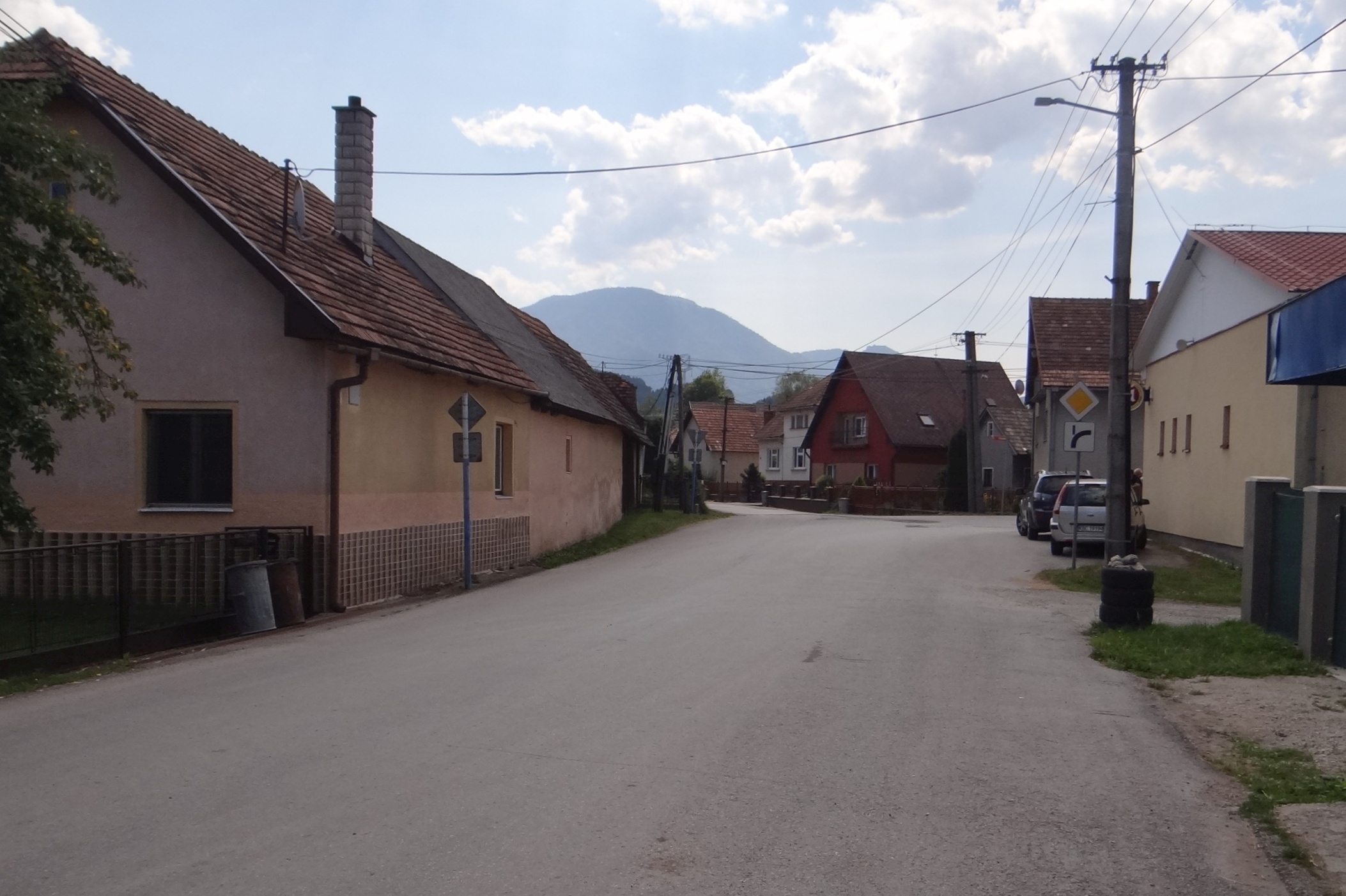

- Flag

- Location of Ďanová in the Žilina Region Location of Ďanová in Slovakia
- Coordinates: 48.98°N 18.92°E
- Country: Slovakia
- Region: Žilina Region
- District: Martin District
- First mentioned: 1252

Area
  - Total: 7.66 km^{2} (2.96 sq mi)
- Elevation: 449 m (1,473 ft)

Population (2025)
  - Total: 546
- Time zone: UTC+1 (CET)
  - Summer (DST): UTC+2 (CEST)
- Postal code: 384 2
- Area code: +421 43
- Vehicle registration plate (until 2022): MT
- Website: www.danova.sk

Ďanová (Hungarian: Deánfalva) is a village and municipality in Martin District in the Žilina Region of northern Slovakia.

== History ==
In historical records the village was first mentioned in 1252. Before the establishment of independent Czechoslovakia in 1918, it was part of Turóc County within the Kingdom of Hungary. From 1939 to 1945, it was part of the Slovak Republic.

== Geography ==
The municipality lies at an altitude of 449 metres (1,473 ft) and covers an area of 7.66 km^{2} (2.96 sq mi) (2025).

== Population ==
Population statistic (10 years)
Year	1995	2005	2015	2025
Count	480	486	557	546
Difference		+1.25%	+14.60%	−1.97%

Population statistic
Year	2024	2025
Count	554	546
Difference		−1.44%

It has a population of 546 people (31 December 2025).

=== Ethnicity ===
Census 2021 (1+ %)
Ethnicity	Number	Fraction
Slovak	548	98.03%
Total	559	

In year 2021 was 559 people by ethnicity 548 as Slovak, 5 as Czech, 4 as Polish, 3 as Not found out, 3 as Hungarian, 2 as Italian, 1 as Vietnamese, 1 as Romani, 1 as Russian, 1 as German, 1 as Moravian and 1 as Other.

Note on population: The difference values of population numbers in the table "Population statistic" and in the sections "Ethnicity" & "Religion" is caused by the use of various statistical methods.

=== Religion ===
Census 2021 (1+ %)
Religion	Number	Fraction
Evangelical Church	197	35.24%
Roman Catholic Church	177	31.66%
None	166	29.7%
Not found out	14	2.5%
Total	559	

In year 2021 was 559 people by religion 197 from Evangelical Church, 177 from Roman Catholic Church, 166 from None, 14 from Not found out, 2 from Other, 1 from Greek Catholic Church, 1 from United Methodist Church and 1 from Ad hoc movements.

== Sport ==
There's Futbal club within the village called FK Ďanová. Web homepage of the club is http://www.fkdanova.sk

== Genealogical resources ==
The records for genealogical research are available at the state archive "Statny Archiv in Bytca, Slovakia"

- Roman Catholic church records (births/marriages/deaths): 1777-1949 (parish B)
- Lutheran church records (births/marriages/deaths): 1689-1895 (parish B)

== See also ==
- List of municipalities and towns in Slovakia
