= Gemerský Jablonec =

Gemerský Jablonec Almágy
- Municipality
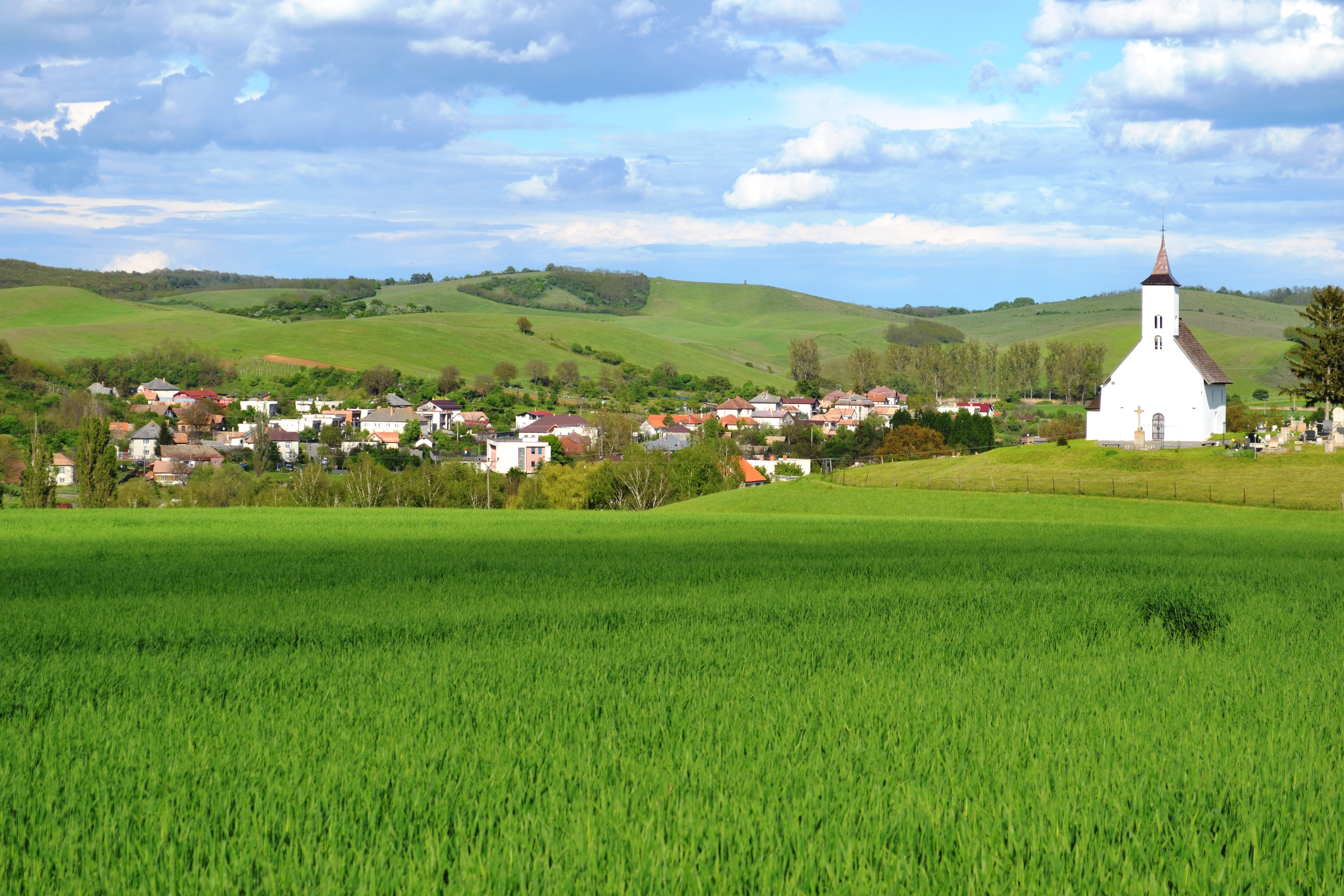

- Flag

- Location of Gemerský Jablonec in the Banská Bystrica Region Location of Gemerský Jablonec in Slovakia
- Coordinates: 48.20°N 19.98°E
- Country: Slovakia
- Region: Banská Bystrica Region
- District: Rimavská Sobota District
- First mentioned: 1275

Area
  - Total: 10.44 km^{2} (4.03 sq mi)
- Elevation: 228 m (748 ft)

Population (2025)
  - Total: 706
- Time zone: UTC+1 (CET)
  - Summer (DST): UTC+2 (CEST)
- Postal code: 980 35
- Area code: +421 47
- Vehicle registration plate (until 2022): RS
- Website: www.obecgemerskyjablonec.sk

Gemerský Jablonec (Hungarian: Almágy) is a village and municipality in the Rimavská Sobota District of the Banská Bystrica Region of southern Slovakia.

== Geography ==
The municipality lies at an altitude of 228 metres (748 ft) and covers an area of 10.44 km^{2} (4.03 sq mi) (2025).

== History ==
In historical records, the village was first mentioned in 1275 (Almag). In 1554, it had to pay tributes to the Turks. Until 1918 and between 1938 and 1945 it was part of Hungary.

== Population ==
Population statistic (10 years)
Year	1995	2005	2015	2025
Count	654	687	712	706
Difference		+5.04%	+3.63%	−0.84%

Population statistic
Year	2024	2025
Count	690	706
Difference		+2.31%

It has a population of 706 people (31 December 2025).

=== Ethnicity ===
Census 2021 (1+ %)
Ethnicity	Number	Fraction
Hungarian	631	87.76%
Slovak	95	13.21%
Romani	71	9.87%
Not found out	22	3.05%
Total	719	

In year 2021 was 719 people by ethnicity 631 as Hungarian, 95 as Slovak, 71 as Romani, 22 as Not found out, 3 as Czech and 1 as Ukrainian.

Note on population: The difference values of population numbers in the table "Population statistic" and in the sections "Ethnicity" & "Religion" is caused by the use of various statistical methods.

=== Religion ===
Census 2021 (1+ %)
Religion	Number	Fraction
Roman Catholic Church	631	87.76%
None	47	6.54%
Greek Catholic Church	12	1.67%
Calvinist Church	9	1.25%
Not found out	9	1.25%
Total	719	

In year 2021 was 719 people by religion 631 from Roman Catholic Church, 47 from None, 12 from Greek Catholic Church, 9 from Calvinist Church, 9 from Not found out, 7 from Evangelical Church, 3 from Christian Congregations in Slovakia and 1 from Old Catholic Church.

== Genealogical resources ==
The records for genealogical research are available at the state archive "Statny Archiv in Banska Bystrica, Slovakia"

- Roman Catholic church records (births/marriages/deaths): 1730-1891 (parish B)

== See also ==
- List of municipalities and towns in Slovakia
