= ŠFK Prenaks Jablonec =

Slovak football club

- Full name: ŠFK Prenaks Jablonec
- Founded: 1937
- Ground: Jablonec
- Head coach: Sameh Sabry Abdallah Nawar
- League: Majstrovstvá regiónu
- 2011–12: Majstrovstvá regiónu, 1st

ŠFK Prenaks Jablonec is a Slovak football team, based in the village of Jablonec. The club was founded in 1937.
