= ŠK Plavecký Štvrtok =

Slovak football club

ŠK Plavecký Štvrtok OFK Vysoká
- Full name: ŠK Plavecký Štvrtok OFK Vysoká
- Founded: 1930
- Ground: Plavecký Štvrtok
- League: Majstrovstvá regiónu
- 2011–12: Majstrovstvá regiónu, 2nd

ŠK Plavecký Štvrtok OFK Vysoká is a Slovak football team, based in the town of Plavecký Štvrtok. The club was founded in 1930.
