= Veľké Úľany =

Veľké Úľany Nagyfödémes
- Municipality
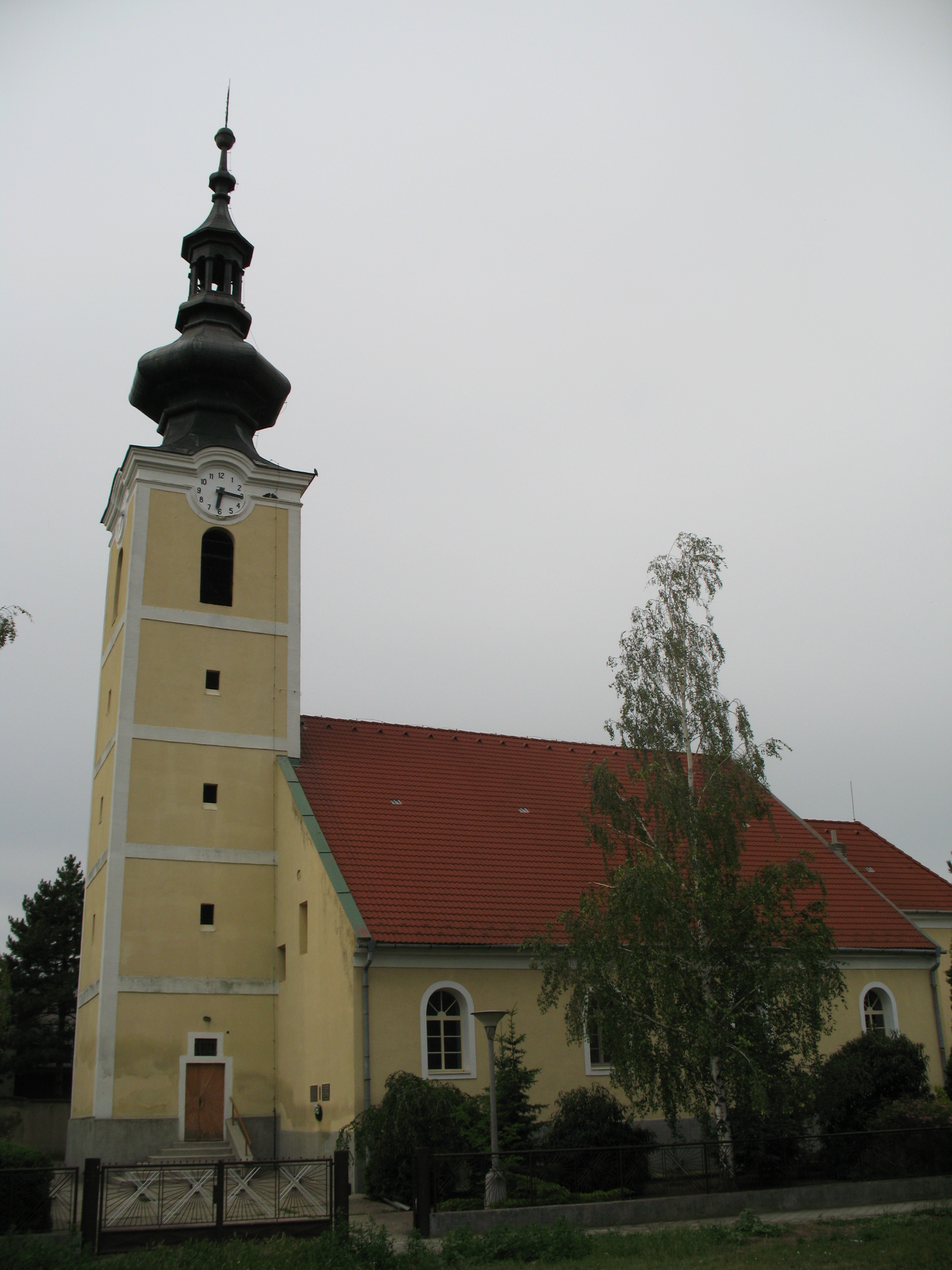

- Flag

- Location of Veľké Úľany in the Trnava Region Location of Veľké Úľany in Slovakia
- Coordinates: 48.17°N 17.57°E
- Country: Slovakia
- Region: Trnava Region
- District: Galanta District
- First mentioned: 1221

Government
  - Mayor: Ferenc Gőgh

Area
  - Total: 41.85 km^{2} (16.16 sq mi)
- Elevation: 119 m (390 ft)

Population (2025)
  - Total: 5,094
- Time zone: UTC+1 (CET)
  - Summer (DST): UTC+2 (CEST)
- Postal code: 925 22
- Area code: +421 31
- Vehicle registration plate (until 2022): GA
- Website: www.ulany.sk

Veľké Úľany (Hungarian: Nagyfödémes) is a large village and municipality in Galanta District of the Trnava Region of south-west Slovakia.

== Geography ==
The municipality lies at an altitude of 119 metres (390 ft) and covers an area of 41.85 km^{2} (16.16 sq mi) (2025). The village is located around 12 km west of Galanta.

=== Parts of the village ===
- Lencsehely
- Nové Osady
- Ekoosada

=== Street names ===
- Bágrová
- Hlavná
- Kaplnská
- Kováčska
- Kpt. Nálepku
- Jazerná
- Mlynská
- Leninová
- Júliusa Fučíka
- Krížná
- Piesková
- Robotnícka
- Školská ulica
- Štefana Majora
- Zoltána Fábryho
- Záhradnícka
- Úzka
- Sadová
- Nová ulica

== History ==
In historical records the village was first mentioned in 1221 as Fudemus. Before the establishment of independent Czechoslovakia in 1918, it was part of Pozsony County within the Kingdom of Hungary. After the Austro-Hungarian army disintegrated in November 1918, Czechoslovak troops occupied the area, later acknowledged internationally by the Treaty of Trianon. Between 1938 and 1945 Veľké Úľany once more became part of Miklós Horthy's Hungary through the First Vienna Award. From 1945 until the Velvet Divorce, it was part of Czechoslovakia. Since then it has been part of Slovakia.

== Population ==
Population statistic (10 years)
Year	1995	2005	2015	2025
Count	4239	4305	4473	5094
Difference		+1.55%	+3.90%	+13.88%

Population statistic
Year	2024	2025
Count	5011	5094
Difference		+1.65%

It has a population of 5094 people (31 December 2025).

=== Ethnicity ===
Census 2021 (1+ %)
Ethnicity	Number	Fraction
Hungarian	2609	55.92%
Slovak	2074	44.45%
Not found out	220	4.71%
Total	4665	

In year 2021 was 4665 people by ethnicity 2609 as Hungarian, 2074 as Slovak, 220 as Not found out, 25 as Czech, 20 as Romanian, 11 as Romani, 5 as Russian, 4 as Italian, 4 as Rusyn, 4 as German, 3 as Ukrainian, 3 as Austrian, 3 as Other, 2 as Polish and 1 as Moravian.

Note on population: The difference values of population numbers in the table "Population statistic" and in the sections "Ethnicity" & "Religion" is caused by the use of various statistical methods.

=== Religion ===
Census 2021 (1+ %)
Religion	Number	Fraction
Roman Catholic Church	3252	69.71%
None	973	20.86%
Not found out	172	3.69%
Evangelical Church	158	3.39%
Total	4665	

In year 2021 was 4665 people by religion 3252 from Roman Catholic Church, 973 from None, 172 from Not found out, 158 from Evangelical Church, 35 from Greek Catholic Church, 28 from Calvinist Church, 11 from Christian Congregations in Slovakia, 7 from Other, 7 from Ad hoc movements, 5 from Paganism and natural spirituality, 5 from Jehovah's Witnesses, 3 from Old Catholic Church, 3 from Baptists Church, 2 from Eastern Orthodox Church, 2 from United Methodist Church and 2 from Buddhism.
