= OTJ Palárikovo =

Slovak football club

- Full name: OTJ Palárikovo
- Ground: Štadión OTJ Palárikovo, Palárikovo
- Manager: Martin Kobora
- League: Majstrovstvá regiónu
- 2012-13: 6th

OTJ Palárikovo is a Slovak football team, based in the town of Palárikovo. The club was founded before 1929.

== History ==
=== Early years ===
OTJ Palárikovo premiered in the regional competition in the 1941/1942 season. The club was founded as Tótmegyeri SC, and later changed its name to Tótmegyeri LT. These names are related to the fact that these were years falling within the wartime Slovak State, when Palárikovo was taken and occupied by Hungary until the end of World War II in 1945. In the post-war period the club played under the name TJ Palárikovo and later under the current name OTJ Palárikovo.

=== Recent years ===
After years of playing with various foreign football players in the A-team, OTJ Palárikovo stabilized and consists of young players from Palárikovo. In 2019, €1,100 was raised to make new kits.
