= FC Horses Šúrovce =

Slovak football club

FC Horses
- Full name: FC Horses Veľké Úľany
- Founded: 1928
- Ground: Futbalový štadión ŠK Veľké Úľany, Veľké Úľany
- Capacity: 2,100 (250 seats)
- Owner(s): Miroslav Náhlik, František Gögh
- Head coach: Miroslav Hájiček
- League: 3. liga

FC Horses or also FC Horses Veľké Úľany was a Slovak football team, based in the town of Veľké Úľany. The club was founded in 1928.

FC Horses were the third team of FC Spartak Trnava until summer 2016. After the 2016/2017 season, FC Horses ceased to exist in this form, Miroslav Náhlik sold the club's license to FK Spartak Bánovce nad Bebravou.

== History ==
When Miroslav Náhlik, a native of Šúrovce, took the Šúrovce club under his auspices as an official in 2007, its most successful times began. The grounds and stadium were gradually renovated, the club was named to FC Horses Šúrovce and experienced four promotions in four years. The club gradually worked its way up from the VII. regional league to the III. league West. Later, a merger with Spartak took place and Horses performed under the name FC Spartak Trnava C – Šúrovce, when home matches continued to be played in Šúrovce. Over time, however, the club separated from Spartak due to the new transfer rules and returned to its original name. In 2017, the club sold it’s license to play in the 4. Liga to FK Spartak Bánovce nad Bebravou.

=== Club names ===
- 1928 – FC Horses Šúrovce
- 2014 – FC Spartak Trnava C – Šúrovce
- 2016 – FC Horses

== Notable players ==
- (Slovakia) Jaroslav Timko
- (Slovakia) Marek Ujlaky
- (Slovakia) Vladimír Kožuch
