= Nižný Hrušov =

- Municipality
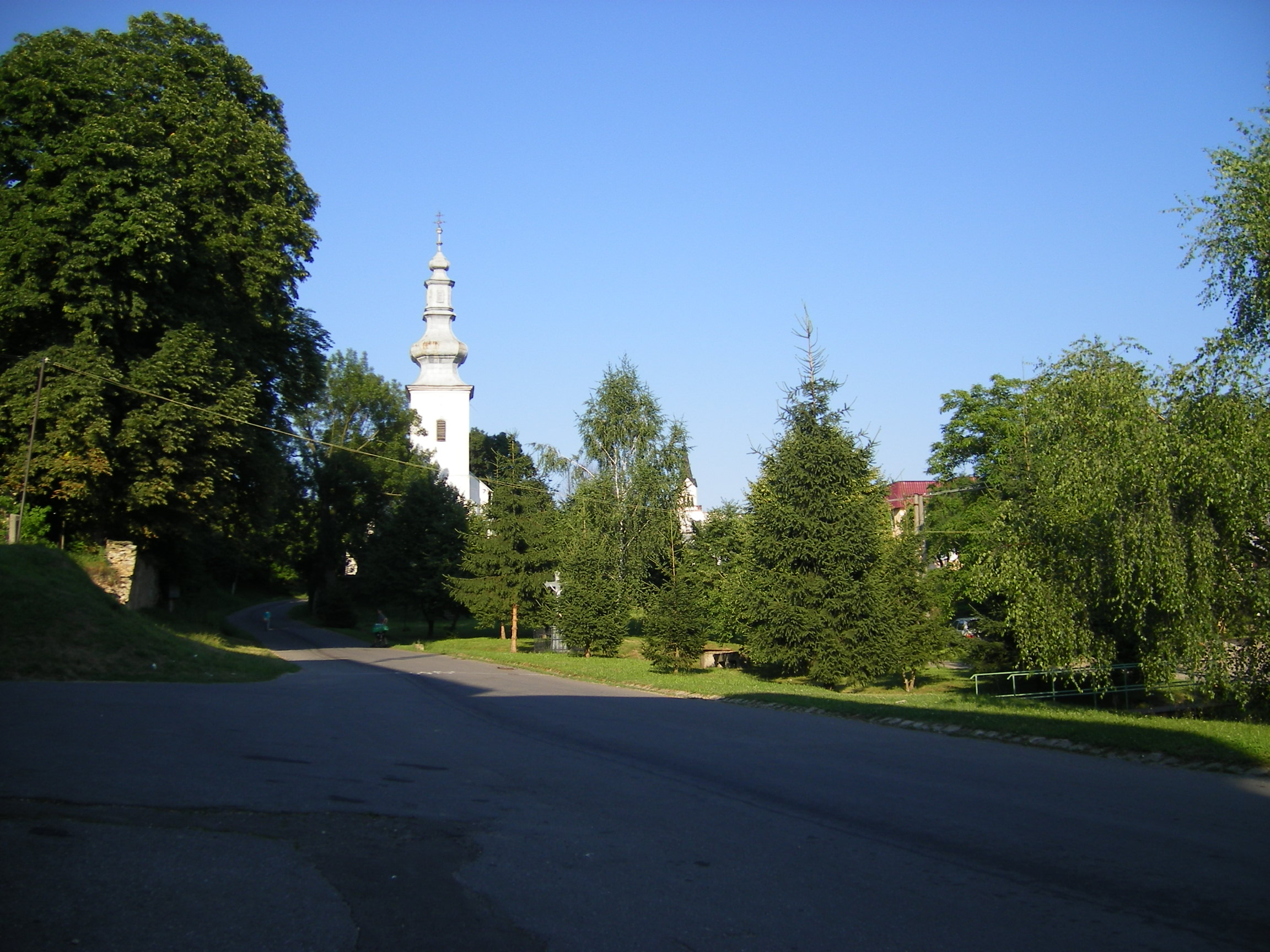

- Flag

- Location of Nižný Hrušov in the Prešov Region Location of Nižný Hrušov in Slovakia
- Coordinates: 48.80°N 21.78°E
- Country: Slovakia
- Region: Prešov Region
- District: Vranov nad Topľou District
- First mentioned: 1254

Area
  - Total: 18.47 km^{2} (7.13 sq mi)
- Elevation: 120 m (390 ft)

Population (2025)
  - Total: 1,489
- Time zone: UTC+1 (CET)
  - Summer (DST): UTC+2 (CEST)
- Postal code: 942 2
- Area code: +421 57
- Vehicle registration plate (until 2022): VT
- Website: www.niznyhrusov.sk

Nižný Hrušov (Hungarian: Alsókörtvélyes) is a village and municipality in Vranov nad Topľou District in the Prešov Region of eastern Slovakia.

== History ==
In historical records the village was first mentioned in 1254.

== Geography ==
The municipality lies at an altitude of 120 metres (390 ft) and covers an area of 18.47 km^{2} (7.13 sq mi) (2025).

== Population ==
Population statistic (10 years)
Year	1995	2005	2015	2025
Count	1697	1663	1578	1489
Difference		−2.00%	−5.11%	−5.64%

Population statistic
Year	2024	2025
Count	1501	1489
Difference		−0.79%

It has a population of 1489 people (31 December 2025).

=== Ethnicity ===
Census 2021 (1+ %)
Ethnicity	Number	Fraction
Slovak	1427	94.62%
Not found out	78	5.17%
Total	1508	

In year 2021 was 1508 people by ethnicity 1427 as Slovak, 78 as Not found out, 10 as Rusyn, 5 as Romani, 3 as Czech, 3 as Bulgarian, 1 as German and 1 as Hungarian.

Note on population: The difference values of population numbers in the table "Population statistic" and in the sections "Ethnicity" & "Religion" is caused by the use of various statistical methods.

=== Religion ===
Census 2021 (1+ %)
Religion	Number	Fraction
Roman Catholic Church	1067	70.76%
Greek Catholic Church	265	17.57%
Not found out	75	4.97%
None	65	4.31%
Evangelical Church	17	1.13%
Total	1508	

In year 2021 was 1508 people by religion 1067 from Roman Catholic Church, 265 from Greek Catholic Church, 75 from Not found out, 65 from None, 17 from Evangelical Church, 4 from Apostolic Church, 4 from Ad hoc movements, 3 from Calvinist Church, 3 from Other, 2 from Other and not ascertained christian church, 2 from Jehovah's Witnesses and 1 from Eastern Orthodox Church.
