= Zeleneč, Slovakia =

Zeleneč
- Municipality
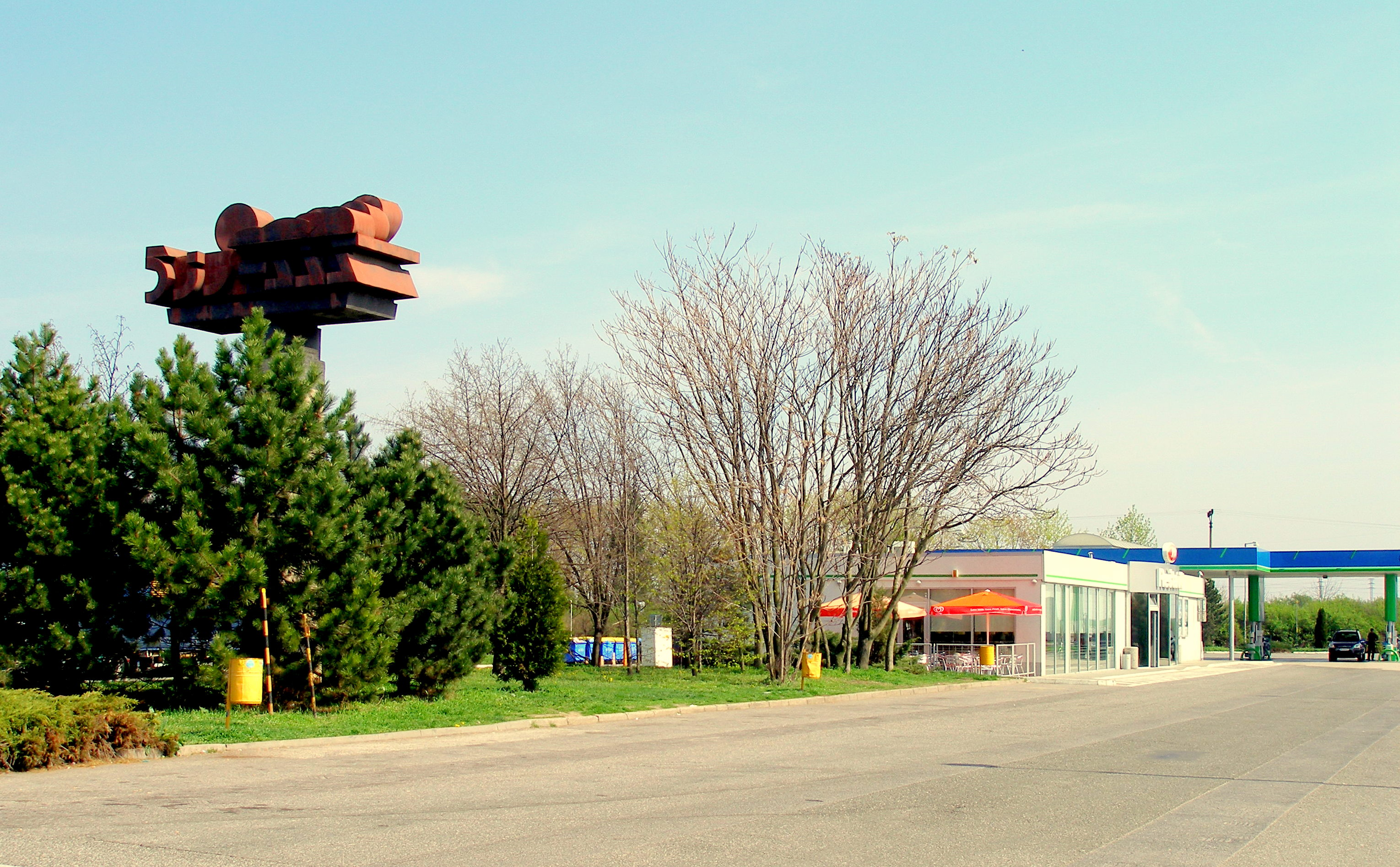

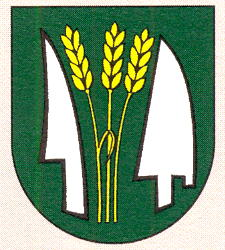
- Flag Coat of arms

- Location of Zeleneč in the Trnava Region Location of Zeleneč in Slovakia
- Coordinates: 48°19′45″N 17°35′43″E
- Country: Slovakia
- Region: Trnava Region
- District: Trnava District
- First mentioned: 1243

Area
  - Total: 11.74 km^{2} (4.53 sq mi)
- Elevation: 145 m (476 ft)

Population (2025)
  - Total: 2,559
- Time zone: UTC+1 (CET)
  - Summer (DST): UTC+2 (CEST)
- Postal code: 919 21
- Area code: +421 33
- Vehicle registration plate (until 2022): TT
- Website: www.zelenec.sk

Zeleneč (Hungarian: Szelincs) is a village and municipality of Trnava District in the Trnava region of Slovakia. Located about 8 km from Trnava it is a relatively big village, similar to other villages in Western Slovakia. Zeleneč inhabitants work mostly in neighboring production plants or sustain themselves with agriculture.

== Geography ==
The municipality lies at an altitude of 145 metres (476 ft) and covers an area of 11.74 km^{2} (4.53 sq mi) (2025).

== Population ==
Population statistic (10 years)
Year	1995	2005	2015	2025
Count	2419	2381	2577	2559
Difference		−1.57%	+8.23%	−0.69%

Population statistic
Year	2024	2025
Count	2578	2559
Difference		−0.73%

It has a population of 2559 people (31 December 2025).

=== Ethnicity ===
Census 2021 (1+ %)
Ethnicity	Number	Fraction
Slovak	2589	98.36%
Total	2632	

In year 2021 was 2632 people by ethnicity 2589 as Slovak, 25 as Not found out, 12 as Czech, 10 as Other, 6 as Russian, 3 as Hungarian, 2 as Irish, 2 as Vietnamese, 2 as Polish, 1 as Italian, 1 as Rusyn and 1 as German.

Note on population: The difference values of population numbers in the table "Population statistic" and in the sections "Ethnicity" & "Religion" is caused by the use of various statistical methods.

=== Religion ===
Census 2021 (1+ %)
Religion	Number	Fraction
Roman Catholic Church	2068	78.57%
None	445	16.91%
Total	2632	

In year 2021 was 2632 people by religion 2068 from Roman Catholic Church, 445 from None, 25 from Not found out, 22 from Evangelical Church, 18 from Other, 9 from Islam, 9 from Greek Catholic Church, 7 from Other and not ascertained christian church, 7 from Christian Congregations in Slovakia, 7 from Ad hoc movements, 6 from Buddhism, 3 from Eastern Orthodox Church, 2 from Paganism and natural spirituality, 2 from Czechoslovak Hussite Church, 1 from Jewish community and 1 from Church of the Brethren.
