= Plavecký Štvrtok =

Plavecký Štvrtok Detrekőcsütörtök
- Municipality
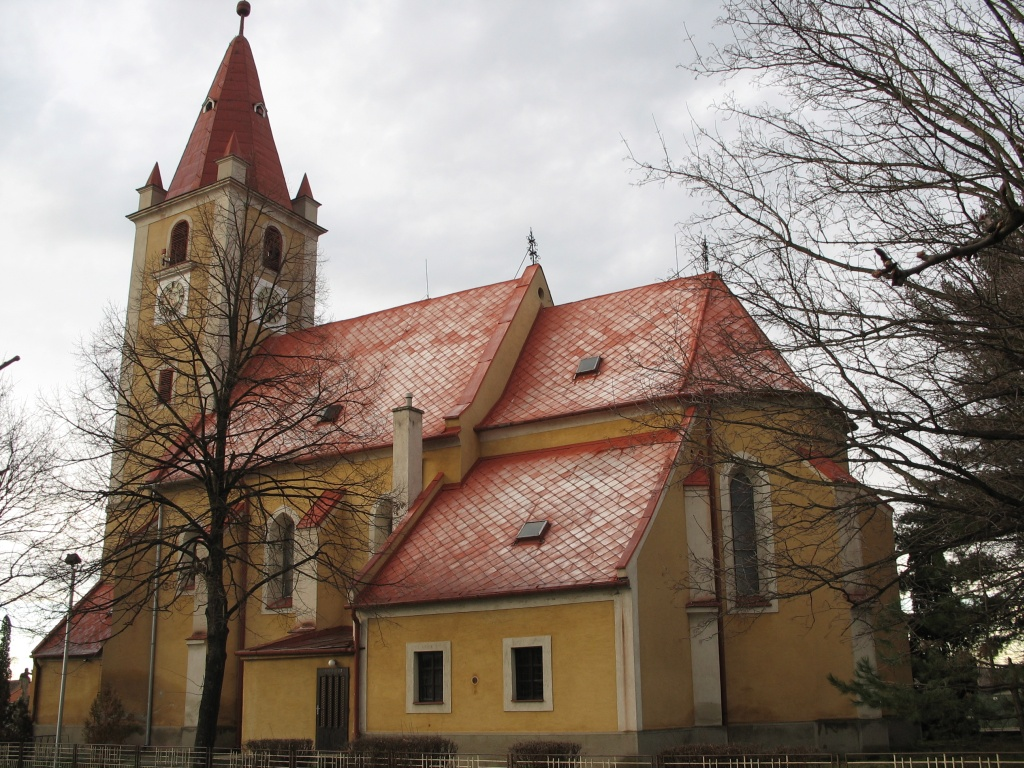
- Saint Mission Church in Plavecký Štvrtok

- Flag

- Location of Plavecký Štvrtok in the Bratislava Region Location of Plavecký Štvrtok in Slovakia
- Coordinates: 48.37°N 17.00°E
- Country: Slovakia
- Region: Bratislava Region
- District: Malacky District
- First mentioned: 1200

Area
  - Total: 22.45 km^{2} (8.67 sq mi)
- Elevation: 157 m (515 ft)

Population (2025)
  - Total: 2,598
- Time zone: UTC+1 (CET)
  - Summer (DST): UTC+2 (CEST)
- Postal code: 900 68
- Area code: +421 34
- Vehicle registration plate (until 2022): MA
- Website: www.obecplaveckystvrtok.sk

Plavecký Štvrtok (Hungarian: Detrekőcsütörtök) is a village and municipality in western Slovakia in Malacky District in the Bratislava region.

== Etymology ==
Štvrtok means in Slovak Thursday and it indicates that the settlement held a market on Thursdays. The attribute Plavecký comes from the name of Plavecký Castle estate (the castle is named after Cumans, in Slovak Plavci).

== Geography ==
The municipality lies at an altitude of 157 metres (515 ft) and covers an area of 22.45 km^{2} (8.67 sq mi) (2025).

== Population ==
Population statistic (10 years)
Year	1995	2005	2015	2025
Count	1937	2305	2351	2598
Difference		+18.99%	+1.99%	+10.50%

Population statistic
Year	2024	2025
Count	2609	2598
Difference		−0.42%

It has a population of 2598 people (31 December 2025).

=== Ethnicity ===
Census 2021 (1+ %)
Ethnicity	Number	Fraction
Slovak	2274	90.48%
Not found out	219	8.71%
Romani	89	3.54%
Total	2513	

In year 2021 was 2513 people by ethnicity 2274 as Slovak, 219 as Not found out, 89 as Romani, 19 as Czech, 14 as Hungarian, 9 as Other, 4 as Ukrainian, 4 as Polish, 3 as Rusyn, 2 as Russian, 2 as English, 1 as Italian, 1 as Austrian, 1 as German, 1 as Canadian, 1 as Croatian and 1 as Albanian.

Note on population: The difference values of population numbers in the table "Population statistic" and in the sections "Ethnicity" & "Religion" is caused by the use of various statistical methods.

=== Religion ===
Census 2021 (1+ %)
Religion	Number	Fraction
Roman Catholic Church	1387	55.19%
None	661	26.3%
Not found out	230	9.15%
Evangelical Church	133	5.29%
Christian Congregations in Slovakia	31	1.23%
Total	2513	

In year 2021 was 2513 people by religion 1387 from Roman Catholic Church, 661 from None, 230 from Not found out, 133 from Evangelical Church, 31 from Christian Congregations in Slovakia, 18 from Jehovah's Witnesses, 12 from Calvinist Church, 11 from Greek Catholic Church, 6 from Other, 6 from Ad hoc movements, 5 from Eastern Orthodox Church, 2 from Paganism and natural spirituality, 2 from Islam, 2 from Buddhism, 2 from Apostolic Church, 1 from Jewish community, 1 from Old Catholic Church, 1 from Other and not ascertained christian church, 1 from Czechoslovak Hussite Church and 1 from Bahá'i Community.

== Landmarks ==
- Saint Mission Church Plavecký Štvrtok
