= TJ Družstevník Nižný Hrušov =

Slovak football club

- Full name: TJ Družstevník Nižný Hrušov
- Founded: 1990
- Ground: Štadión TJ Družstevník Nižný Hrušov, Nižný Hrušov
- Chairman: Jozef Štefanov
- Manager: Miroslav Kužma
- League: 5. liga
- 2015–16: 5th

TJ Družstevník Nižný Hrušov is a Slovak football team, based in the town of Nižný Hrušov. The club was founded in 1990.
