= ŠK Blava Jaslovské Bohunice =

Slovak football club

Blava Jaslovské Bohunice
- Full name: Športový klub Blava Jaslovské Bohunice
- Founded: 1928
- Ground: Štadión Jaslovské Bohunice, Jaslovské Bohunice
- Capacity: 2,000
- Chairman: Peter Ryška
- Head coach: Miroslav Karhan
- League: 4. liga
- 2010–11: 15th (relegated)

ŠK Blava Jaslovské Bohunice (full name: Športový klub Blava Jaslovské Bohunice) is a Slovak sports club based in the village of Jaslovské Bohunice. It was founded in 1928, the football club plays its home games in a stadium with a capacity of 2,000 spectators, of which 700 are seats. The club colors are blue and yellow.

== History ==
=== Historic names ===
- 1928 – founded
- TJ Blava Jaslovské Bohunice(Telovýchovná jednota Blava Jaslovské Bohunice)
- ŠK Blava Jaslovské Bohunice (Športový klub Blava Jaslovské Bohunice)

== Stadium ==
Jaslovské Bohunice currently play their home games in the štadión Jaslovské Bohunice.

On 11 September 2024, Jaslovské Bohunice got drawn with Slovak first division side FC Spartak Trnava in the 1st round of the Slovak Cup. They lost the game 2:0. 1600 people came to the game.

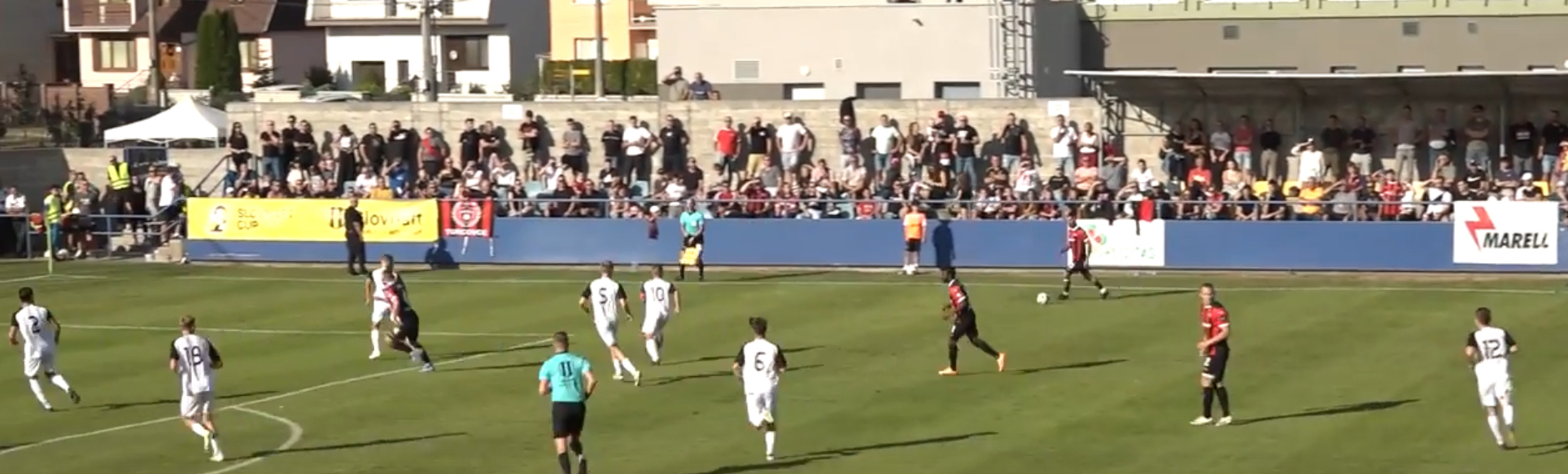
Jaslovské Bohunice vs Spartak Trnava.
