= Jablonec, Pezinok District =

Jablonec Halmos
- Municipality
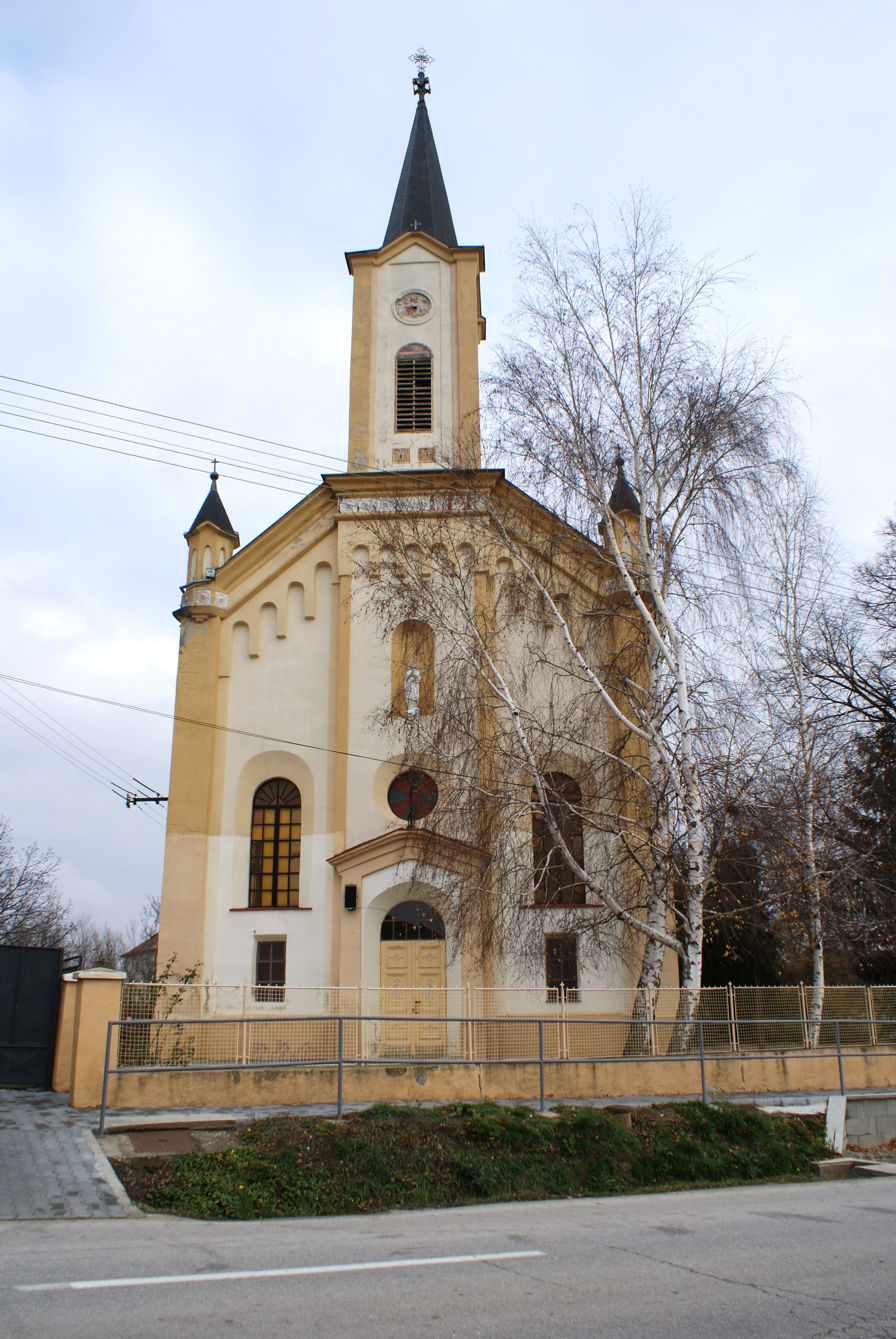
- Church in Jablonec

- Flag

- Location of Jablonec in the Bratislava Region Location of Jablonec in Slovakia
- Coordinates: 48.33°N 17.45°E
- Country: Slovakia
- Region: Bratislava Region
- District: Pezinok District
- First mentioned: 1342

Area
  - Total: 8.69 km^{2} (3.36 sq mi)
- Elevation: 159 m (522 ft)

Population (2025)
  - Total: 1,060
- Time zone: UTC+1 (CET)
  - Summer (DST): UTC+2 (CEST)
- Postal code: 900 86
- Area code: +421 33
- Vehicle registration plate (until 2022): PK
- Website: www.jablonec.sk

Jablonec (Hungarian: Halmos, German: Halmesch) is a village and municipality in western Slovakia in Pezinok District in the Bratislava region.

== Population ==
Population statistic (10 years)
Year	1995	2005	2015	2025
Count	770	830	993	1060
Difference		+7.79%	+19.63%	+6.74%

Population statistic
Year	2024	2025
Count	1042	1060
Difference		+1.72%

It has a population of 1060 people (31 December 2025).

=== Ethnicity ===
Census 2021 (1+ %)
Ethnicity	Number	Fraction
Slovak	956	95.21%
Not found out	44	4.38%
Total	1004	

In year 2021 was 1004 people by ethnicity 956 as Slovak, 44 as Not found out, 5 as Czech, 3 as Russian, 2 as Vietnamese, 2 as Romanian, 2 as Hungarian, 1 as Jewish, 1 as Serbian, 1 as Other and 1 as English.

Note on population: The difference values of population numbers in the table "Population statistic" and in the sections "Ethnicity" & "Religion" is caused by the use of various statistical methods.

=== Religion ===
Census 2021 (1+ %)
Religion	Number	Fraction
Roman Catholic Church	711	70.82%
None	203	20.22%
Not found out	43	4.28%
Evangelical Church	14	1.39%
Christian Congregations in Slovakia	11	1.1%
Total	1004	

In year 2021 was 1004 people by religion 711 from Roman Catholic Church, 203 from None, 43 from Not found out, 14 from Evangelical Church, 11 from Christian Congregations in Slovakia, 5 from Apostolic Church, 4 from Ad hoc movements, 3 from Other and not ascertained christian church, 3 from Greek Catholic Church, 2 from Calvinist Church, 2 from Other, 1 from Eastern Orthodox Church, 1 from Hinduism and 1 from Czechoslovak Hussite Church.

== Genealogical resources ==
The records for genealogical research are available at the state archive "Statny Archiv in Bratislava, Slovakia"

- Roman Catholic church records (births/marriages/deaths): 1774–1897 (parish B)

== See also ==
- List of municipalities and towns in Slovakia
