= List of Romani settlements =

Map

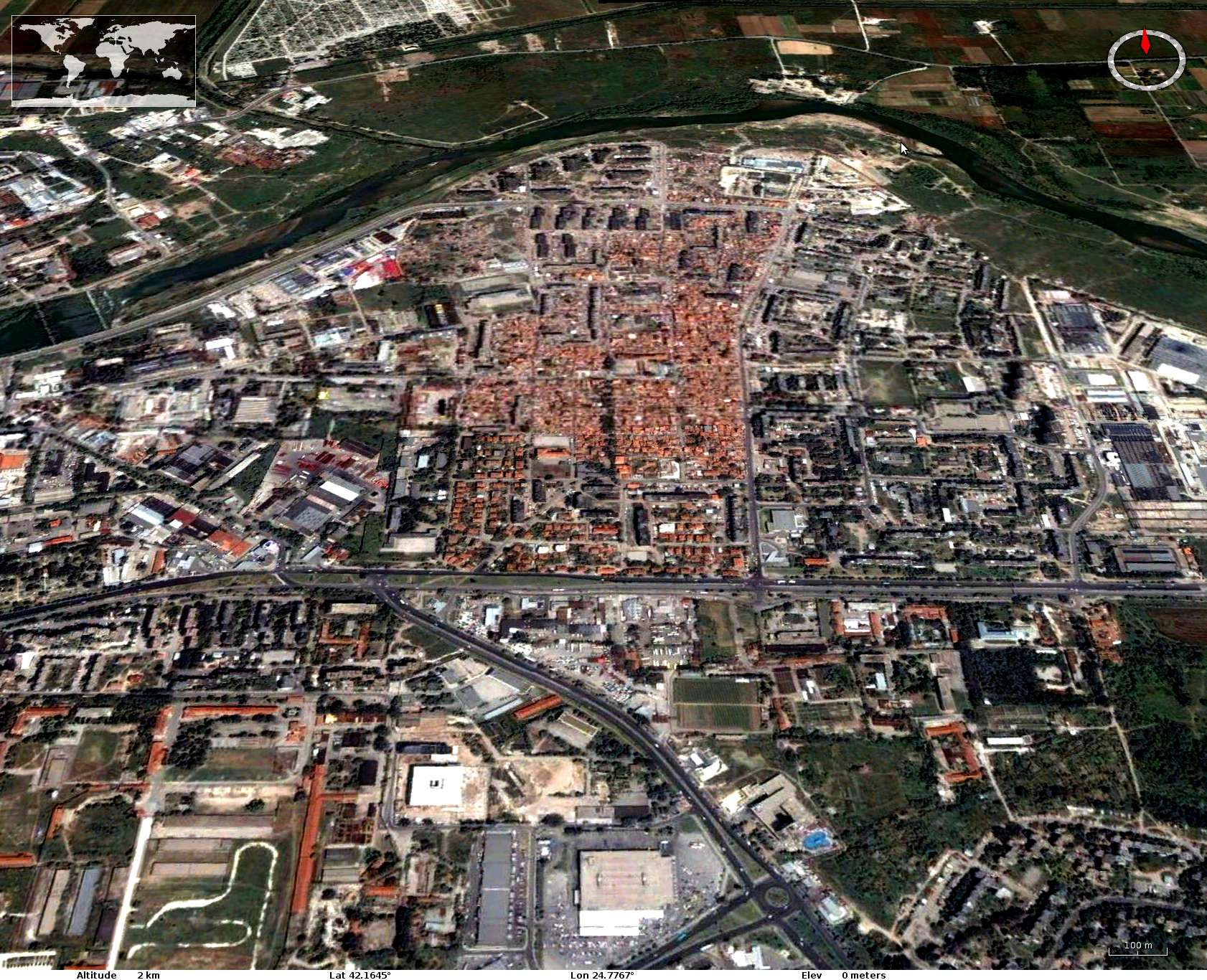
Stolipinovo district in Plovdiv, Bulgaria, is one of the largest Roma communities in Europe.

This is an incomplete list of settlements with significant (plurality or majority) ethnic Roma population.

== Europe ==
=== Central and Eastern Europe ===
Bosnia and Herzegovina

Settlement	Type	Location	Population	Roma population	Roma %	Comment
Kiseljak	village	Tuzla, Tuzla	917	327	35.66%	43.95°N 18.083333°E
Ušanovići	village	Goražde, Bosnian-Podrinje Canton Goražde	41	29	70.73%	
Staro Selo	village	Kalesija, Tuzla	22	19	86.36%	

Bulgaria

Settlement	Type	Location	Population	Roma population	Roma %	Comment
Stolipinovo	neighborhood	Plovdiv	55,000			42.154167°N 24.785°EThe largest Roma community in the Balkans
Fakulteta	neighborhood	Sofia	45,000			
Tokaito	neighborhood	Pazardzhik	30,000			
Nadezhda	neighborhood	Sliven	20,000		~100%	
Maksuda	neighborhood	Varna	10,000		~100%	
Sheker	neighborhood	Plovdiv	10,000		~100%	
Hristo Botev	neighborhood	Sofia	10,000			Its population is mixed Bulgarians and Roma
Shesti	neighborhood	Nova Zagora	10,000			
Probuda	neighborhood	Burgas	7,277			The majority of today's population is Roma
Karmen	neighborhood	Kazanlak	7,000			
Lozenets	neighborhood	Stara Zagora	5,000			
Filipovtsi	neighborhood gypsy part	Sofia	4,659		~100%	
Gradets	village	Kotel, Sliven	3,759	2,970	79.01%	Gradets is probably the largest Roma village in the world
Bukovlak	village	Pleven, Pleven	3,620	2,052	56.69%	Second largest Roma village in Bulgaria
Varbitsa	town	Varbitsa, Shumen	3,325	1,841	55.37%	Varbitsa is the only town (urban settlement) in Bulgaria with a Roma majority
Dolni Tsibar	village	Valchedram, Montana	1,586	1,216	76.67%	This village has a very young age structure and a growing population while other nearby villages are ageing and depopulating very fast
L. Karavelovo	village	Aksakovo, Varna	1,539	1,065	69.20%	
Seliminovo	village	Sliven, Sliven	1,481	819	55.30%	
Svoboda	gypsy part	Maglizh	800	800	~100%	
Svoboda	village	Chirpan, Stara Zagora	1,131	688	60.83%	
Dzhurovo	village	Pravets, Sofia	1,112	681	61.24%	
Sredets	village	Kaynardzha, Silistra	1,370	679	49.56%	Roma constitute the largest ethnic group in this village
Gradinarovo	village	Provadia, Varna	807	635	78.69%	
Zimnitsa	village	Maglizh, Stara Zagora	838	592	70.64%	
Sindel	village	Avren, Varna	1,054	592	56.17%	
Sotirya	village	Sliven, Sliven	2,096	577 (out of 1,070 respondents).	53.93%	More than thousand people did not state their ethnicity during the 2011 Census
Vardun	village	Targovishte, Targovishte	890	572	64.27%	
Izvorsko	village	Aksakovo, Varna	773	518	67.01%	
Maysko	village	Elena, Veliko Tarnovo	783	494	63.09%	
Disevitsa	village	Pleven, Pleven	874	472	54,00%	
Belomortsi	village	Omurtag, Targovishte	866	451 (out of 548 respondents)	82.30%	More than 300 inhabitants did not answer the optional question on their ethnicity. 451 out of 548 declared to be part of the Romani minority in Bulgaria
Snezhina	village	Provadia, Varna	616	448	72.73%	
Belo Pole	village	Ruzhintsi, Vidin	744	390	52.42%	
Tsarkvitsa	village	Nikola Kozlevo, Shumen	617	378	61.26%	
Dinevo	village	Haskovo, Haskovo	719	373	51.88%	
Velichkovo	village	Dalgopol, Varna	560	372	66.43%	
Cherna	village	Dobrichka, Dobrich	532	364	68.42%	
Cherkovna	village	Dulovo, Silistra	578	364	62.98%	
Prisad	village	General Toshevo, Dobrich	425	340	80.80%	
Lozenets	village	Straldzha, Yambol	616	327	53.08%	
Ostrets	village	Targovishte, Targovishte	435	326	74.94%	
Chintulovo	village	Sliven, Sliven	1,297	322 (out of 616 respondents).	52.27%	Nearly 700 people did not state their ethnicity during the 2011 Census
Zlatna Niva	village	Kaspichan, Shumen	618	321	51.94%	
Golyam Izvor	village	Stambolovo, Haskovo	389	308	79.18%	
Kriva Reka	village	Nikola Kozlevo, Shumen	495	289	58.38%	
Buynovo	village	Targovishte, Targovishte	465	284	61.08%	
Izvorovo	village	Antonovo, Targovishte	409	268	65.53%	
Bryagovo	village	Haskovo, Haskovo	462	251	54.33%	
Glufishevo	village	Sliven, Sliven	699	244 (out of 548 respondents).	44.53%	More than 150 people did not state their ethnicity
Altsek	village	Dobrichka, Dobrich	328	241	73.48%	
Bolyarski Izvor	village	Haskovo, Haskovo	298	226	75.84%	
Aprilovo	village	Popovo, Targovishte	397	222	55.92%	
Esenitsa	village	Valchi Dol, Varna	364	212	58.24%	
Bistra	village	Alfatar, Silistra	381	212	55.6%	
Dragomazh	village	Isperih, Razgrad	375	200	53.3%	
Probuda	village	Targovishte, Targovishte	414	195	47.10%	
Lyaskovo	village	Dobrichka, Dobrich	302	176	58.28%	
Medovnitsa	village	Dimovo, Vidin	288	168	58.33%	
Orlintsi	village	Sredets, Burgas	315	167	53.02%	
Vasilevo	village	General Toshevo, Dobrich	347	165	47.55%	
Moravitsa	village	Antonovo, Targovishte	192	161	83.85%	
Gabar	village	Sozopol, Burgas	275	140	50.91%	
Sliventsi	village	Dobrichka, Dobrich	227	135	59.47%	
Trigortsi	village	Balchik, Dobrich	158	123	77.85%	
Prespa	village	Balchik, Dobrich	231	110	47.62%	
Boyana	village	Valchi Dol, Varna	236	105	44.49%	
Zhilino	village	Novi Pazar, Shumen	157	94	59.87%	
Robovo	village	Tundzha, Yambol	134	68	50.75%	
Baba Tonka	village	Popovo, Targovishte	91	59	64.84%	
Onogur	village	Tervel, Dobrich	40	37	92.50%	
Vizitsa	village	Malko Tarnovo, Burgas	66	36	54.55%	
Sredina	village	General Toshevo, Dobrich	58	32	55.17%	
Shishkovitsa	village	Antonovo, Targovishte	32	26	81.25%	
Dryanovets	village	Dobrichka, Dobrich	21	20	95.24%	
Struindol	village	Belogradchik, Vidin	27	13	48.15%	
Varzilkovtsi	village	Elena, Veliko Tarnovo	17	10	58.82%	
Glushka	village	Dryanovo, Gabrovo	18	10	55.56%	
Leshnikovtsi	village	Tran, Pernik	13	7	53.85%	

==== Croatia ====
Settlement	Type	Location	Population	Roma population	Roma %	Note
Kuršanec	village	Čakovec, Međimurje	1,584	1,009	64%	

==== Czech Republic ====
Settlement	Type	Location	Population	Roma population	Roma %	Note
Chanov	neighborhood	Most	700 (2022)		100%	50.5052°N 13.6760°E
Janov	quarter	Litvínov	3,795 (2021)			50.5856°N 13.5617°E
Větřní	town	Větřní	3,833 (2023)			48.7773°N 14.2841°E
Bedřiška	neighborhood	Ostrava	100–300 (2021 estimate)			
Předlice	quarter	Ústí nad Labem	1,544 (2021)			
Mojžíř	quarter	Ústí nad Labem	4,222 (2021)			

==== Hungary ====
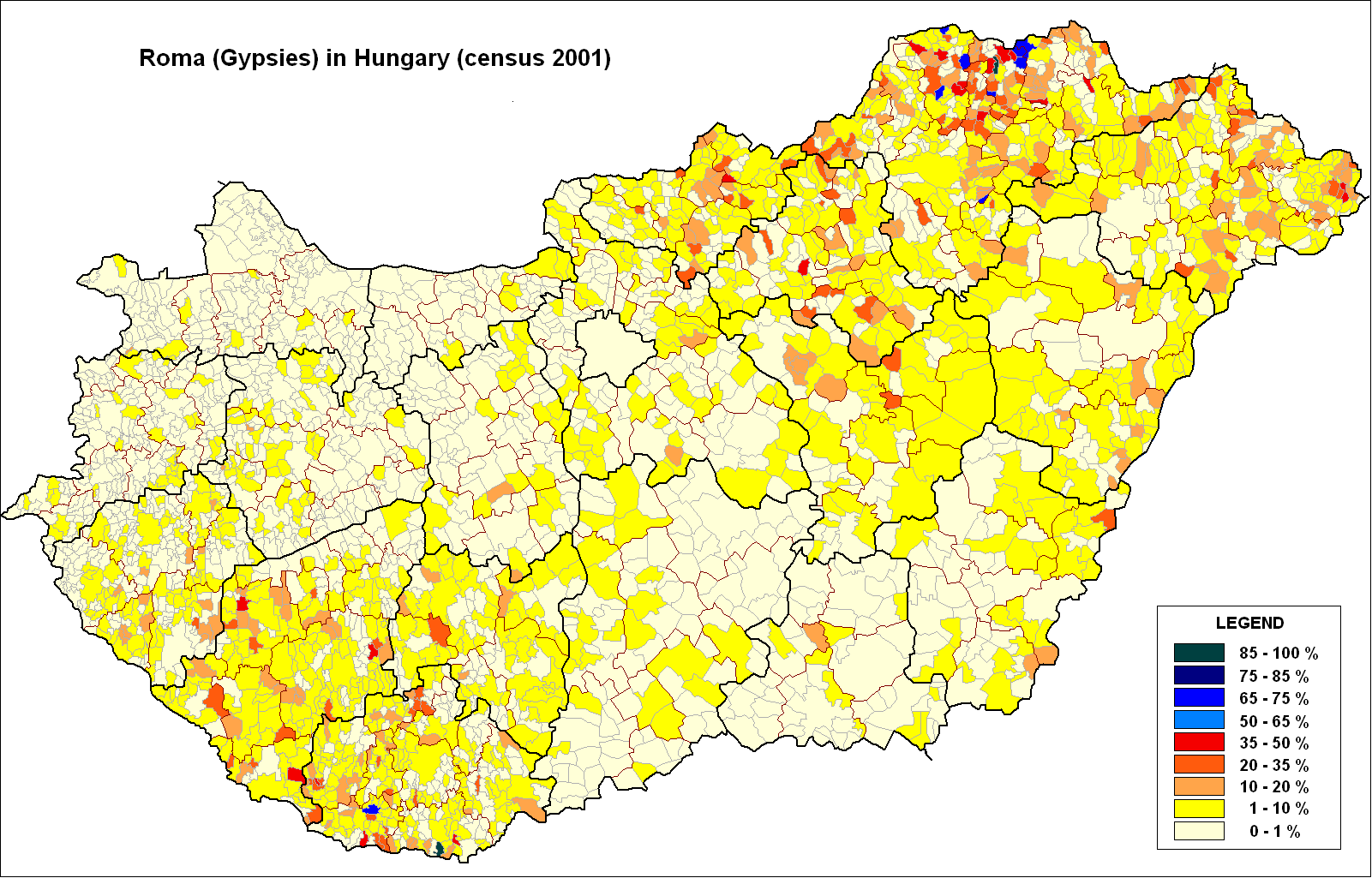
Roma people in Hungary by municipalities.

Settlement	Type	Location	Population	Roma population	Roma %	Note
Hős utca	Street/neighborhood	X. kerület, Budapest			88.5%	
Mésztelep	neighborhood	Tatabanya, Komárom-Esztergom County.			96.3%	47.555222°N 18.4499°E
Muszkástelep	neighborhood	Miskolc, Borsod-Abaúj-Zemplén			97.8%	
Alsószentmárton	village	Siklós, Baranya			98.6%	
Csenyéte	village	Borsod-Abaúj-Zemplén			89.5%	48.43508°N 21.0417°E
Felsőregmec	village	Sátoraljaújhely, Borsod-Abaúj-Zemplén			77.8%	
Adorjás	village	Sellye, Baranya			72.4%	45.85°N 18.066667°E
Drávaiványi	village	Sellye, Baranya			69.3%	
Balajt	village	Edelény, Borsod-Abaúj-Zemplén			59.3%	
Rakacaszend	village	Edelény			57.7%	
Tornanádaska	village	Sátoraljaújhely, Borsod-Abaúj-Zemplén			56.7%	
Gilvánfa	village	Sellye, Baranya			56.3%	
Beret	village	Encs, Borsod-Abaúj-Zemplén			56.1%	
Bódvalenke	village	Edelény, Borsod-Abaúj-Zemplén			55.4%	
Babarcszőlős	village	Siklósi, Baranya			53%	

==== Kosovo ====
Settlement	Type	Location	Population	Roma population	Roma %	Note
Bresje	village	Kosovo Polje, Pristina	5,596	3,354	59.94%	42.95968°N 21.087411°E2,785 (Ashkali), 366 (Roma), 203 (Egyptians)
Plemetin	village	Obilić, Pristina	1,381	904	65.46%	619 (Roma), 285 (Ashkali)
Llukac i Thatë	village	Istok, Peja	160	109	68.13%	109 (Egyptians)

==== North Macedonia ====
Settlement	Type	Location	Population	Roma population	Roma %	Note
Šuto Orizari	municipality	Skopje	17,357	13,311	76.69%	42.041944°N 21.421944°E
Bair	neighborhood	Bitola	5,500	2,500	45.45%	
Dabnica	village	Prilep	66	54	81.82%	

==== Moldova ====
Settlement	Type	Location	Population	Roma population	Roma %	Note
Otaci	town	Ocnița	6,043	3,148	52.09%	48.433333°N 27.8°E
Vulcănești	village	Nisporeni	1,224	1,057	86.36%	
Ursari	village	Călărași	285	233	81.75%	
Coroliovca	village	Hîncești	91	17	18.68%	
Soroca	town	Soroca	28,362	1,525	5%	Often named "World capital of Romani people" Dealul Ţiganilor neighborhood is mostly inhabited by Romani

==== Montenegro ====
Settlement	Type	Location	Population	Roma population	Roma %	Note
Zabrđe	village	Cetinje	119	69	57.98%	

==== Romania ====
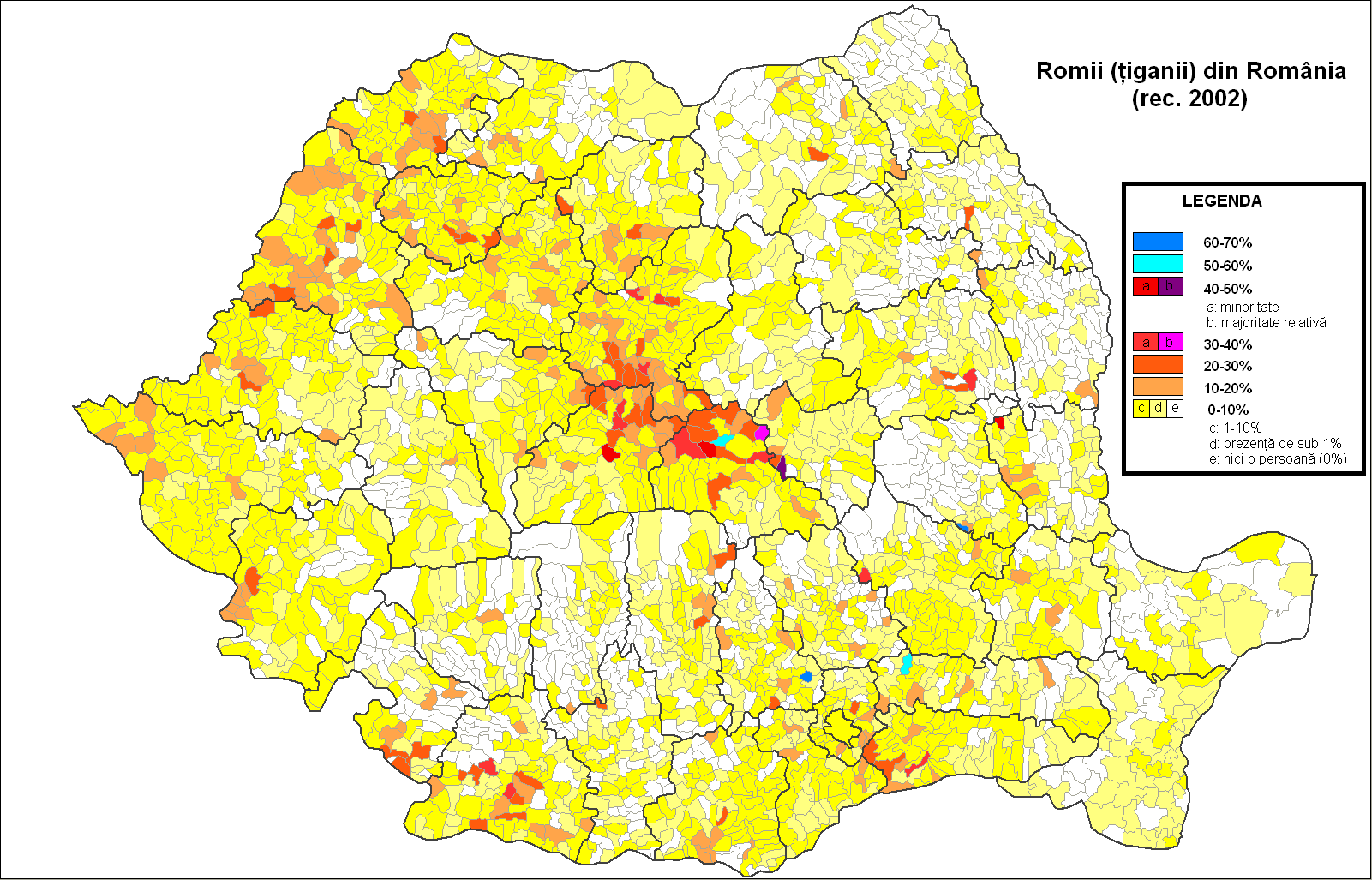
Roma people in Romania by municipalities.

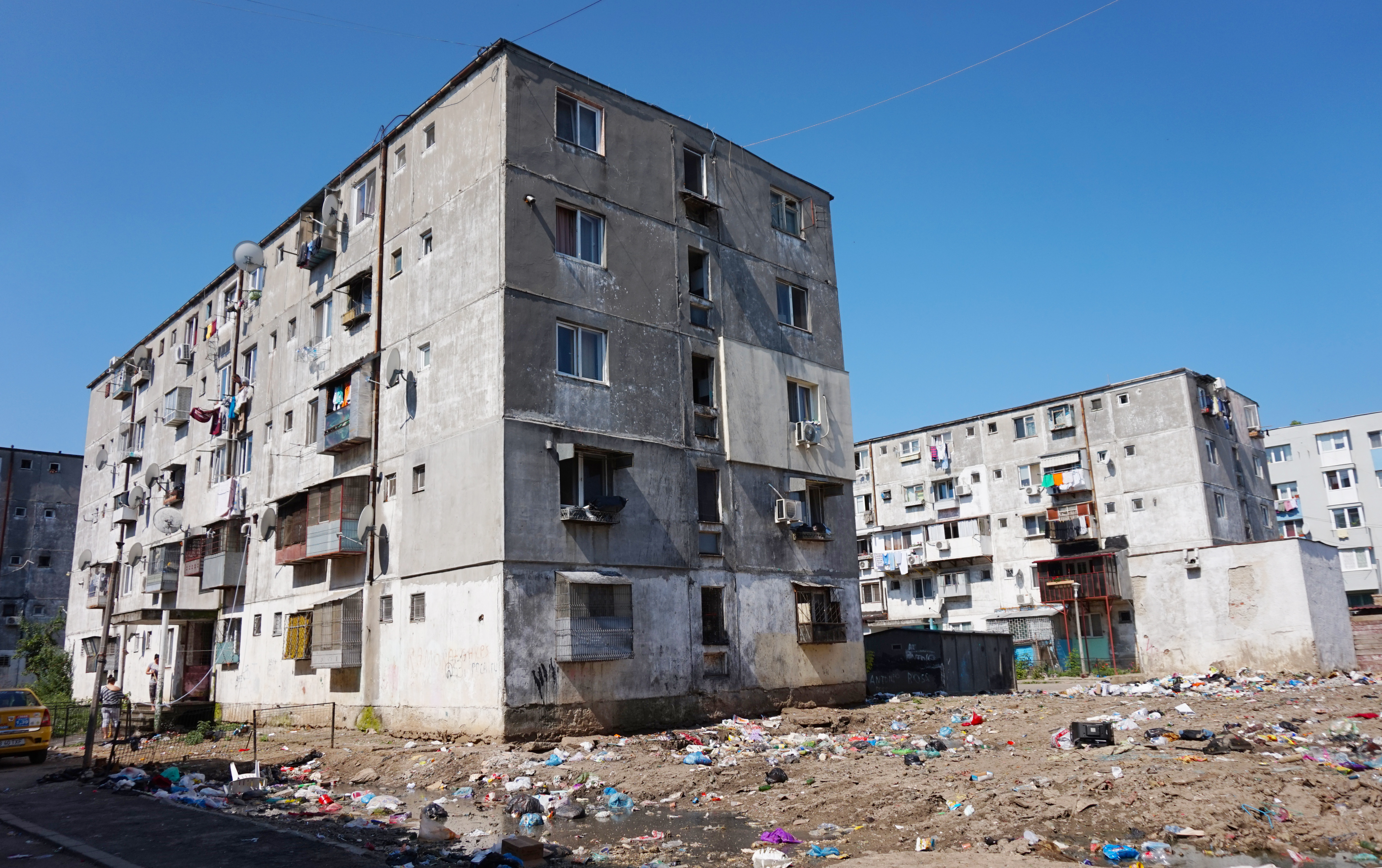
Ferentari, neighborhood in Bucuresti.

Settlement	Type	Location	Population	Roma population	Roma %	Note
Ferentari (Aleea Livezilor)	neighborhood	București	90,000			
Ponorâta	village	Maramureș County	unknown	unknown	~100%	Part of Vălenii Lăpușului, Coroieni
Fața Luncii	neighborhood	Dolj County	unknown	unknown		part of Craiova
Mimiu	neighborhood	Prahova County	unknown	unknown	~100%	Part of Ploiești
Siretu, Vrancea	neighborhood	Vrancea County	unknown	unknown	~100%	Part of Mărășești
Dealul Viilor	neighborhood	Iași County	unknown	unknown	~100%	Part of Hârlău
Rudari	neighborhood	Vâlcea County	unknown	unknown	~100%	Part of Drăgășani
Zanea	village	Iași County	unknown	unknown	~100%	Part of Iași
Gârcini	neighborhood	Brașov County	5,975	unknown	~100%	Part of Săcele
Bărbulești	commune	Ialomița County	4,779	4,146	86,8%	44.726111°N 26.599167°E
Toflea	village	Galați County	5,470	3,865	70.7%	
Fântânele, Dâmbovița	village	Dâmbovița County	2,611	2,553	97.8%	
Vâlcele	village	Covasna County	4,475	2,172	49%	45.8527778°N 25.681389°E
Iazu, Dâmbovița	village	Dâmbovița County	2,601	2,081	80%	
Cornetu, Vrancea	village	Vrancea County	1,940	1,903	98.1%	Part of Slobozia Bradului
Românești, Dâmbovița	village	Dâmbovița County	3,371	1,852	55%	
Băcioiu	village	Bacău County	2,051	1,683	82.1%	
Pata-Rât	illegal settlement	Cluj County	1,500	1,500	~100%	Pata-Rât is the place where the garbage dump of Cluj-Napoca is located. About 1,500 Roma evacuated from the city live in this place
Mironu	village	Suceava County	1,907	1,392	73%	
Bâscenii de Jos	village	Buzău County	2,075	1,355	65.3%	
Gămăcești, Argeș	village	Argeș County	1,165	1,165	~100%	Part of Berevoești
Ungra	commune	Brașov County	2,038	1,080	52.9%	
Pusta, Sălaj	village	Sălaj County	1,454	1,058	72.7%	
Gulia, Suceava	village	Suceava County	2,016	1,047	51.9%	
Ocolna	village	Dolj County	1,061	1,005	94.7%	
Crucea, Iași	village	Iași County	1,539	907	58.9%	
Valea Corbului	village	Argeș County	904	878	97.1%	Part of Călinești
Sălcuța, Dolj	village	Dolj County	1,071 (2011)	737	68.8%	Part of Calopăr
Ormeniș	commune	Brașov County	1,926 (2011)	726	42%	
Pisteștii din Deal	village	Gorj County	992 (2011)	721	72.7%	
Chelința, Maramureș	village	Maramureș County	1,349	700	52%	Part of Ulmeni
Slobozia Bradului	village	Vrancea County	1,326	696	52.5%	
Băgaciu	village	Mureș County	1.342	693	51.6%	
Rădoaia, Bacău	village	Bacău County	1,207	689	57%	
Dudașu	village	Mehedinți County	1,197	660	55.1%	
Stâna, Satu Mare	village	Satu Mare County	1,034	641	62%	
Tonciu, Mureș	village	Mureș County	835	610	73.1	
Arini, Brașov	village	Brașov County	895	583	65.1%	
Măguri, Timiș	village	Timiș County	724	579	80%	Part of Lugoj
Augustin	commune	Brașov County	1,490	557	49%	
Valea Hotarului, Argeș	village	Argeș County	546	540	99%	
Viile Tecii	village	Bistrița-Năsăud County	1,074	535	50%	
Gura Pravăț	village	Argeș County	985	521	52.89%	
Plaiu Câmpinei	village	Prahova County	847	505	59.6%	
Zece Prăjini, Iași	village	Iași County	520	492	94.6%	
Mârza, Dolj	village	Dolj County	587	480	81.8%	
Liești, Vrancea	village	Vrancea County	524	452	86.3%	Part of Slobozia Bradului
Budacu de Jos	village	Bistrița-Năsăud County	896	454	50.6%	
Rudeni, Argeș	village	Argeș County	691	417	60.3%	
Lespezi, Argeș	village	Argeș County	422	413	97.9%	Part of Hârtiești
Beica de Jos	village	Mureș County	851	397	46.7%	
Nemșa	village	Sibiu County	558	384	68.8%	
Cozieni, Ilfov	village	Ilfov County	705	380	53.9%	
Șoard	village	Mureș County	649	377	58.1%	
Țicău, Maramureș	village	Maramureș County	765	376	49.2%	Part of Ulmeni
Gepiș	village	Bihor County	682	373	55%	
Tătârlaua	village	Alba County	719	358	49.8%	
Ticușu Vechi	village	Brașov County	633	332	52.4%	
Lupoaia, Bihor	village	Bihor County	600	316	52.6%	
Rodbav	village	Brașov County	178	302	58.9%	
Dăroaia	village	Alba County	481	285	59.3%	
Mag, Sibiu	village	Sibiu County	439	277	63.1%	
Hetea	village	Covasna County	281	271	96.4%	Part of Vâlcele
Petculești	village	Olt County	1,114	247	63.4%	
Munteni, Neamț	village	Neamț County	398	247	62.1%	
Budiu Mic	village	Mureș County	442	247	55.9%	
Prislop, Sibiu	village	Sibiu County	243	241	99.2%	Part of Rășinari
Idiciu	village	Mureș County	374	198	52.9%	
Valea Beciului	village	Vrancea County	270	190	70.4%	
Zeletin	village	Buzău County	215	188	87.4%	
Valea Șapartocului	village	Mureș County	223	162	72.6%	
Silivaș	village	Alba County	255	142	55.7%	
Nandra, Mureș	village	Mureș County	151	81	53.6%	
Bezidu Nou	village	Mureș County	39	28	71.8%	

==== Russia ====
Settlement	Type	Location	Population	Roma population	Roma %	Note
Elbaevo	village	Mozdoksky, North Ossetia–Alania	504	376	74.6%	
Kalinovsky	farm	Kochubeyevsky, Stavropol	358	217	60.61%	
Donetsky	farm	Zimovnikovsky, Rostov	151	72	47.68%	
Rynok Romanovsky	farm	Tsimlyansky, Rostov	74	70	94.59%	
Kovalevsky	farm	Zimovnikovsky, Rostov	106	59	55.66%	
Niva	farm	Martynovsky, Rostov	65	43	66.15%	
Krasnye Luchi	farm	Zernogradsky, Rostov	67	33	49.25%	
Orlovskaya Balka	village	Kasharsky, Rostov	33	22	66.67%	

==== Serbia ====
Settlement	Type	Location	Population	Roma population	Roma %	Note
Šangaj	neighborhood	Novi Sad	2,500			45.271944°N 19.875833°Emajority Roma prior to 2005
Veliki Rit	neighborhood	Novi Sad	2,500			
Deponija	neighborhood	Belgrade				
Goveđi Brod	neighborhood	Belgrade				
Marinkova Bara	neighborhood	Belgrade				
Jatagan Mala	neighborhood	Belgrade				formerly inhabited by Roma
Mali Leskovac	neighborhood	Belgrade				
Vojni put	neighborhood	Belgrade				
Kartonsko Naselje	informal settlement	Belgrade	986 (2007)		~100%	
Brdarica	village	Mačva District	1,519	488	32.13%	
Bangladeš	suburb	Novi Sad	250		~100%	
Depresija	neighborhood	Novi Sad	150			majority Roma
Nanomir	village	Mionica, Kolubara	239	120	50.21%	
Barlovo	village	Kuršumlija, Toplica	166	85	51.20%	
Dudara	neighborhood	Zrenjanin			~100%	

==== Slovakia ====
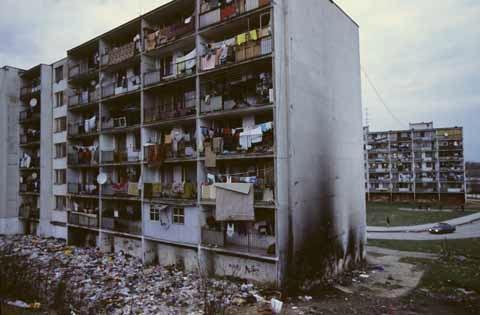
Roma settlement Luník IX near Košice, Slovakia.

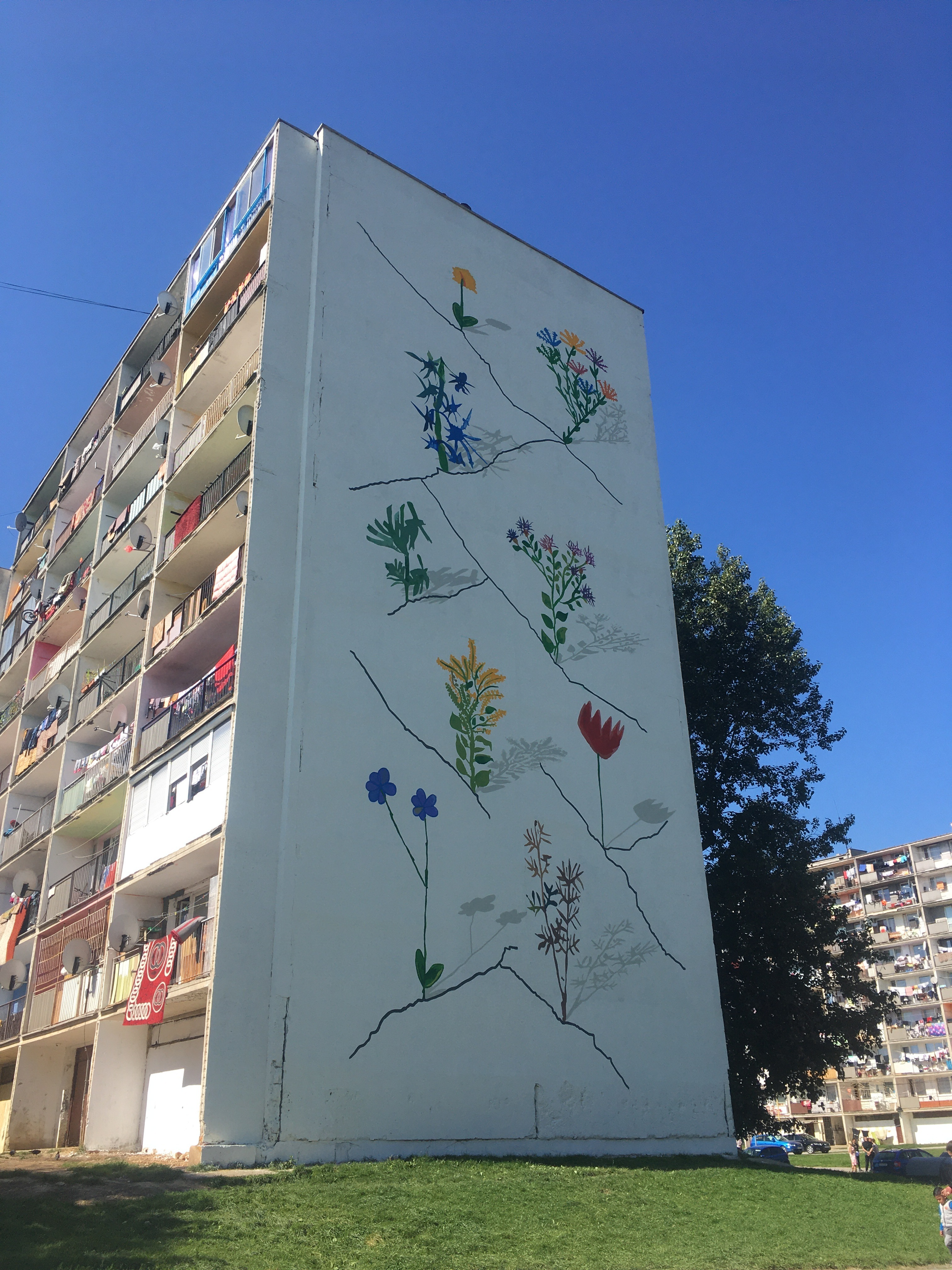
Roma settlement Luník IX near Košice, Slovakia.

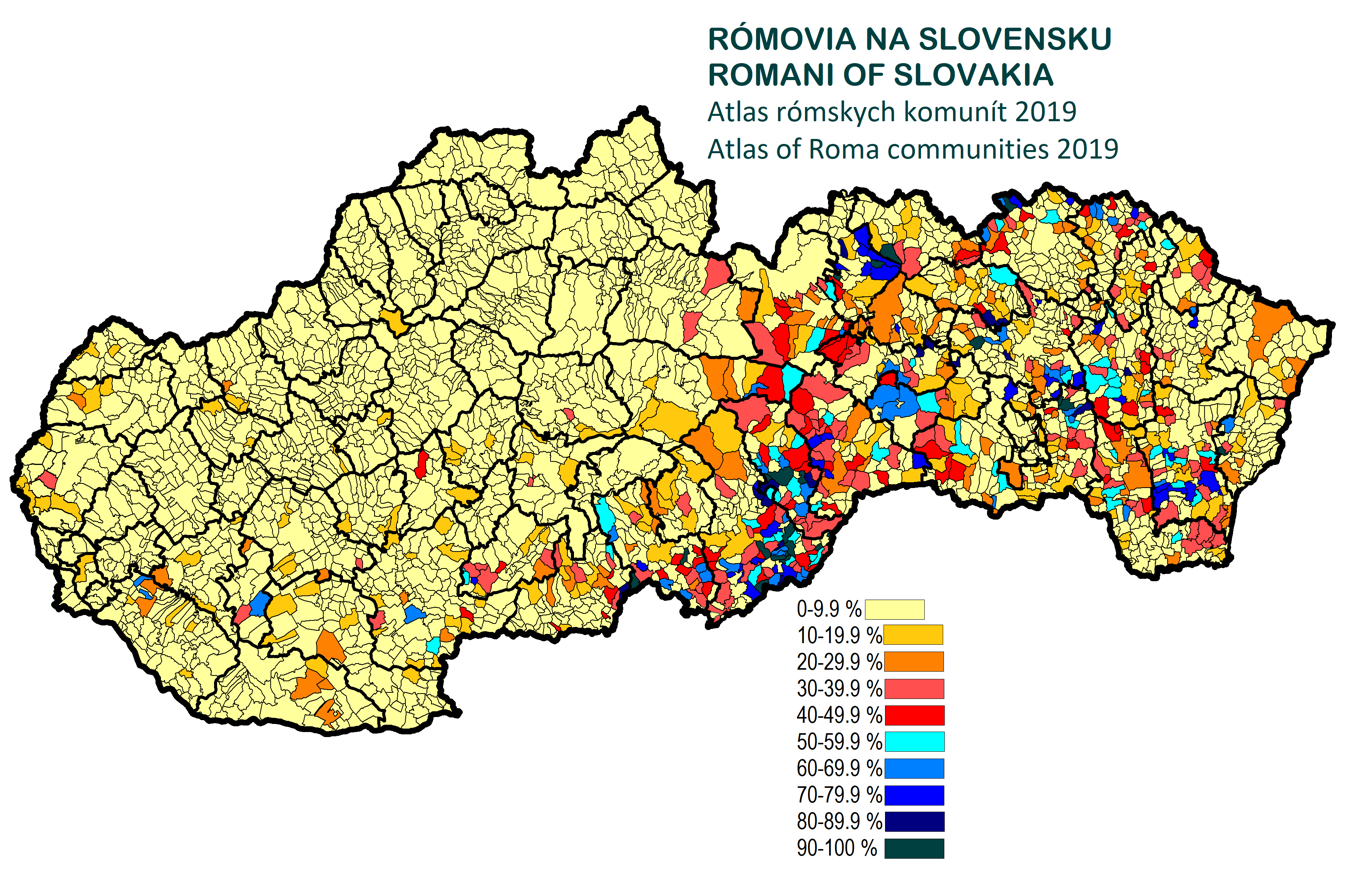

Settlement	Type	Location	Population	Roma population	Roma %	Note
Jarovnice	village	Sabinov, Prešov	7,447	4,176	56.08%	49.05°N 21.07°E
Luník IX	borough	Košice	6,032	3,417 6,032	56.65% ~100%	48.697222°N 21.221389°E the largest Roma community in Slovakia
Rakúsy	village	Kežmarok, Prešov	3,264	2,248	68.87%	
Podhorany	village	Kežmarok, Prešov	2,705	1,906	70.46%	
Lomnička	village	Stará Ľubovňa, Prešov	2,680	2,680	100.00%	49.25°N 20.566667°E
Richnava	village	Gelnica, Košice	2,494	1,559	62.51%	
Žehra	village	Spišská Nová Ves, Košice	2,099	1,395	66.46%	
Krížová Ves	village	Kežmarok, Prešov	2,008	1,249	62.20%	
Stráne pod Tatrami	village	Kežmarok, Prešov	2,083	1,078	51.75%	
Ostrovany	village	Sabinov, Prešov	1,803	977	54.19%	
Mirkovce	village	Prešov, Prešov	1,204	768	63.79%	
Drahňov	village	Michalovce, Košice	1,352	627	46.38%	
Lenartov	village	Bardejov, Prešov	1,058	593	56.05%	
Petrová	village	Bardejov, Prešov	925			
Doľany	village	Levoča, Prešov	779	551	70.73%	
Zbudské Dlhé	village	Humenné, Prešov	769	537	69.83%	
Cigel'ka	village	Bardejov, Prešov	616			
Sútor	village	Rimavská Sobota, Banská Bystrica	514	420	81.71%	
Hucín	village	Revúca, Banská Bystrica	877	391	44.58%	
Šarišská Poruba	village	Prešov, Prešov	641	310	48.36%	
Bôrka	village	Rožňava, Košice	516	291	56.40%	
Nitra nad Ipľom	village	Lučenec, Banská Bystrica	345	230	66.67%	
Hunkovce	village	Svidník, Prešov	311			
Kesovce	village	Rimavská Sobota, Banská Bystrica	285			
Rakytník	village	Rimavská Sobota, Banská Bystrica	329	176	53.50%	
Roztoky	village	Svidník, Prešov	345	168	48.70%	
Varadka	village	Bardejov, Prešov	248	130	52.42%	
Dulovo	village	Rimavská Sobota, Banská Bystrica	205	118	57.56%	48.3737°N 20.1898°E
Dlhoňa	village	Svidník, Prešov	91	48	52.75%	

==== Slovenia ====
Settlement	Type	Location	Population	Roma population	Roma %	Note
Kerinov Grm	village	Municipality of Krško, southeastern Slovenia	134 (2012)			It was established as an autonomous settlement in 2010
Pušča	village	Municipality of Murska Sobota, northeastern Slovenia	531		99%	It was established as an autonomous settlement in 2002. Very exemplary gipsy community.

=== Southern Europe ===
Poland : Maszkowice

==== Spain ====
Settlement	Type	Location	Population	Roma population	Roma %	Note
Sacromonte	neighborhood	Granada				The traditional Gitano quarter of Granada
Triana	neighborhood	Seville				A neighborhood traditionally linked to Gitano history
Nou Barris	neighborhood	Barcelona				

==== Portugal ====
Settlement	Type	Location	Population	Roma population	Roma %	Note
Caneira, Montijo	neighborhood	Setúbal				

==== Italy ====
Settlement	Type	Location	Population	Roma population	Roma %	Note
Scampia	neighborhood	Naples				
Arghillà	suburb	Reggio Calabria				
Ciccarello	neighborhood	Reggio Calabria				
Rione Marconi	neighborhood	Reggio Calabria				
Ciambra	neighborhood	Gioia Tauro				
Ciampa di Cavallo	neighborhood	Lamezia Terme				
Rancitelli	neighborhood	Pescara				
CEP San Donato	neighborhood	Pescara				
Fontanelle	neighborhood	Pescara				

==== Greece ====
Settlement	Type	Location	Population	Roma population	Roma %	Religion	Note	Social status
Ano Liosia	suburb	Athens	33,565					
Dendropotamos	suburb	Thessaloniki	Unknown	Unknown	100%		Christianity	A significant population of Roma live in the area
Alibekio, Serres	neighborhood	Serres	unknown	unknown	100%	Christianity		
Drosero	neighborhood	Xanthi	8,293 (2018)	8,293	100.00%			41.13028°N 24.90806°E
Pontismeno, Iraklia	village	Serres	1,666	1,230	73.83%	Christianity	The rest are Greeks from Thrace more detailed from Vize	Dukl
Flabouro, Visaltia	village	Serres	837	680	80.00%	Christianity		
Anthi, Visaltia	village	Serres	625	380	60.80%	Christianity	Rest are Sarakatsani, Aromanians and Greeks from Thrace	Fully assimilated into the Greek society most of the young inhabitants are of mixed origin
Symvoli, Amfipoli	village	Serres	252	130	51.59%	Christianity	The rest are Greeks from Bafra and Greeks from Smyrna	
Nevra, Rodopi	village	Rodopi	158	158	100.00%	Islam		
Velkio, Rodopi	village	Rodopi	329	285	86.63%	Islam	The rest are Pomaks	
Ayia Sofia, Thessaloniki	village	Thessaloniki	3000	3000	100%	Christianity		Completely unintegrated into Greek society. Their settlement is a ghetto
Ergani, Rodopi	village	Rodopi	347	322	92.80%	Islam	The rest are Pomaks	
Athigganochori, Xanthi	village	Xanthi	Unknown	Unknown	100%	Undefined		
Sinikismos Athigganon, Xanthi	neighborhood in the village of Magiko	Xanthi	Unknown	Unknown	100%	Undefined	Literal translation:Gypsy settlement	
Avantos, Alexandroupoli	neighborhood	Alexandroupoli	unknown	unknown	100%	Islam		Quite a degraded area. The residents of this district in 2011 memed because in a report from a local channel that said that in the area in question a shelter was opening, a lady who was against this decision did not speak Greek well and her words did not make sense.
Mavrika, Karditsa	village	Karditsa	1273 (2021 census)	1273	100%	Christianity		

== Turkey ==
=== European and Asian part ===
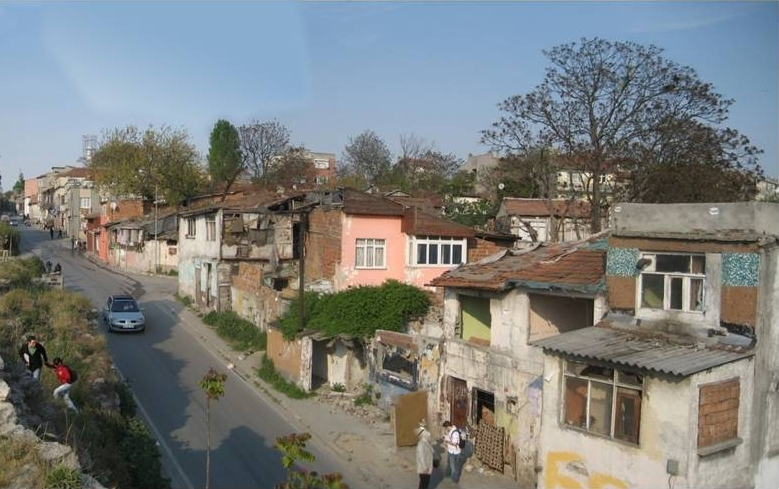
Sulukule

==== Turkey ====
Settlement	Type	Location	Population	Roma population	Roma %	Note
Sulukule	neighborhood	Istanbul				Centre of Gypsy cultural life, oldest Roma settlement in Europe
Ayvansaray	neighborhood	Istanbul	18,504 (2014)			41.038333°N 28.9425°E
Dolapdere	neighborhood	Istanbul				
Hacıhüsrev	neighborhood	Istanbul				
Tarlabaşı	neighborhood	Istanbul				
Ayrancılar	neighborhood	İzmir				
Örnekköy	neighborhood	İzmir				
Çavuşbey	neighborhood	Edirne	5,118			
Menzilahır	neighborhood	Edirne	3,838			
Umurbey	neighborhood	Edirne	2,551			
Ersevenler	neighborhood	Erzincan	1,242			
Sukapı	neighborhood	Kars	681	681	100.00%	

== See also ==
- Romani people by country
- Romani people in Eastern Europe
- Romanistan
