= Dulovo =

Dulovo may refer to:

- Dulovo, Bulgaria, a town
- Dulovo, Slovakia, a village
- Dulovo, Ukraine, a village
