= Murska =

Murska may refer to:

== People ==
- Ilma de Murska (1834–1889), Austrian opera singer

== Places ==
- Murska Republika, unrecognized state in Balkans during 1919
- Murska Sobota, a town in north-eastern Slovenia
  - Diocese of Murska Sobota, Roman Catholic diocese in Murska Sobota, Slovenia
  - Krog, Murska Sobota, a village in the Municipality of Murska Sobota
  - Murska Sobota Cathedral, a Roman Catholic cathedral dedicated to Saint Nicholas in Murska Sobota, Slovenia
  - Pušča, Murska Sobota, a village in the Municipality of Murska Sobota
  - Veščica, Murska Sobota, a village in the Municipality of Murska Sobota

== Other ==
- 42nd Infantry Division Murska, an infantry formation of the Royal Yugoslav Army
- MNZ Murska Sobota, Slovenian Third League football club
