= Banglades =

Banglades can refer to:

- Bangladesh, country in South Asia
- Bangladeš, suburban settlement near Novi Sad, Serbia
