= Golyam Izvor =

Golyam Izvor refers to the following places in Bulgaria:

- Golyam Izvor, Haskovo Province
- Golyam Izvor, Lovech Province
