= Podhorany =

Podhorany may refer to several places in Slovakia notably in the Prešov Region.

- Podhorany, Kežmarok District
- Podhorany, Nitra District
- Podhorany, Prešov District
