= Batka =

Batka may refer to:

- Bátka, a village and municipality in southern Slovakia
- Bat'ka (Батька), nickname for Belarusian president Alexander Lukashenko
- Beda Batka (1922–1994), Czech-American cinematographer
- Richard Batka (1868–1922), Jewish Czech-Austrian musicologist, music critic and librettist for Der Kuhreigen

== See also ==
- Batko (disambiguation)
