= Batko =

Batko is a nickname literally meaning "father" is several Slavic languages. It may refer to:

- Almir Čehajić (born 1962), Bosnian talk show host and actor
- Bat'ko Makhno, or Nestor Makhno (1888 – 1934), Ukrainian anarcho-communist revolutionary and Russian Civil War commander
- Edmund Różycki (1827 – 1893), Polish general in the January Uprising
- Veselin Vlahović (born 1969), Montenegrin Serb war criminal

== See also ==
- BATCO
- Batka (disambiguation)
