= Rakytník =

Municipality of Slovakia

Rakytník Rakottyás
- Municipality
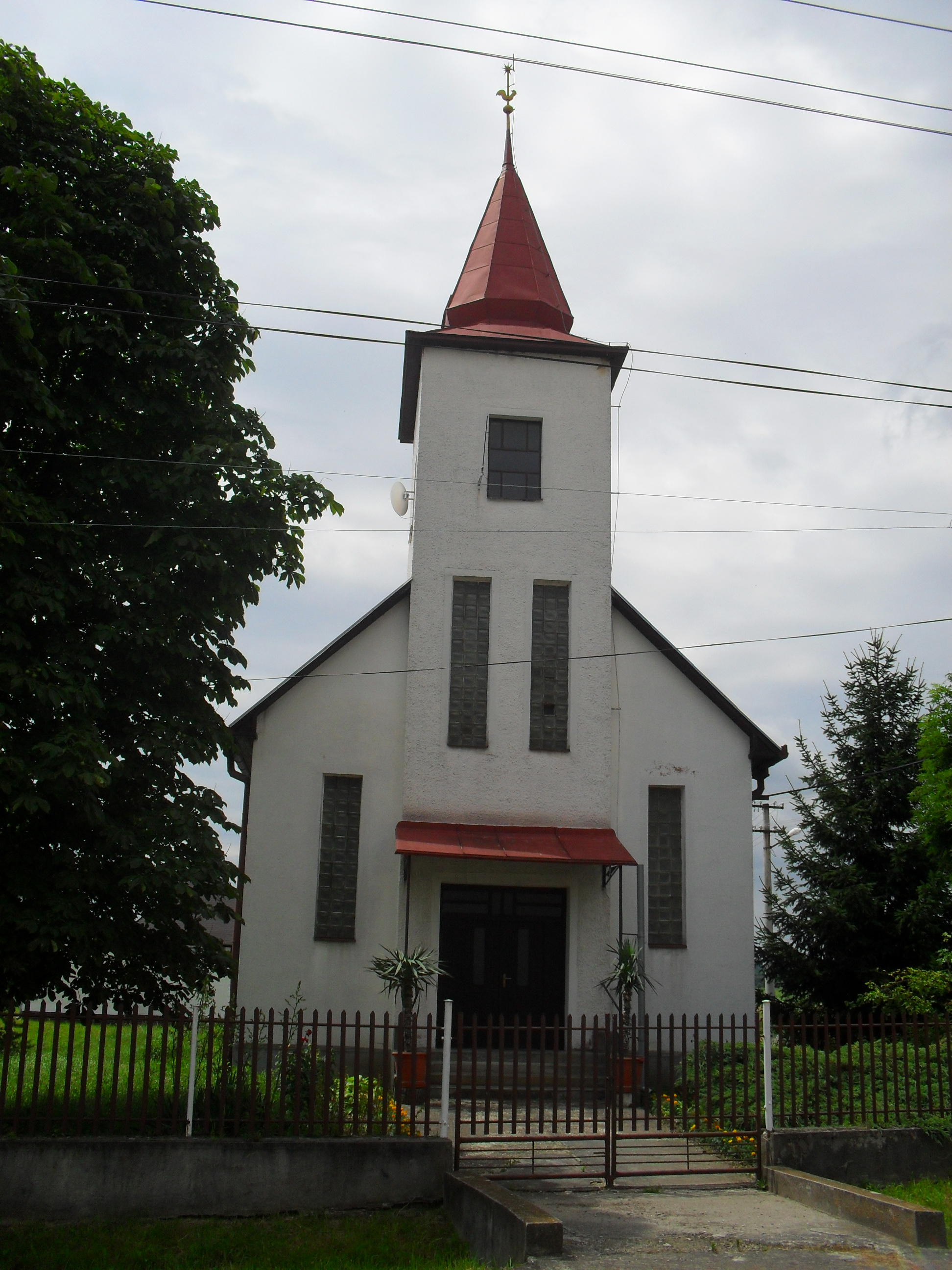

- Flag

- Location of Rakytník in the Banská Bystrica Region Location of Rakytník in Slovakia
- Coordinates: 48.39°N 20.18°E
- Country: Slovakia
- Region: Banská Bystrica Region
- District: Rimavská Sobota District
- First mentioned: 1451

Area
  - Total: 8.36 km^{2} (3.23 sq mi)
- Elevation: 181 m (594 ft)

Population (2025)
  - Total: 347
- Time zone: UTC+1 (CET)
  - Summer (DST): UTC+2 (CEST)
- Postal code: 980 21
- Area code: +421 47
- Vehicle registration plate (until 2022): RS
- Website: obec-rakytnik3.webnode.sk

Rakytník (Hungarian: Rakottyás) is a village and municipality in the Rimavská Sobota District of the Banská Bystrica Region of southern Slovakia. As of the latest estimates, the population of Rakytník is approximately 317 residents. The village is situated about 4 kilometers away from the main road connecting Bratislava and Košice, near the village of Bátka.

== Geography ==
The municipality lies at an altitude of 181 metres (594 ft) and covers an area of 8.36 km^{2} (3.23 sq mi) (2025).

== Population ==
Population statistic (10 years)
Year	1995	2005	2015	2025
Count	254	259	313	347
Difference		+1.96%	+20.84%	+10.86%

Population statistic
Year	2024	2025
Count	342	347
Difference		+1.46%

It has a population of 347 people (31 December 2025).

=== Ethnicity ===
Census 2021 (1+ %)
Ethnicity	Number	Fraction
Romani	187	56.83%
Hungarian	184	55.92%
Not found out	109	33.13%
Slovak	39	11.85%
Total	329	

In year 2021 was 329 people by ethnicity 187 as Romani, 184 as Hungarian, 109 as Not found out and 39 as Slovak.

Note on population: The difference values of population numbers in the table "Population statistic" and in the sections "Ethnicity" & "Religion" is caused by the use of various statistical methods.

=== Religion ===
Census 2021 (1+ %)
Religion	Number	Fraction
None	189	57.45%
Calvinist Church	73	22.19%
Roman Catholic Church	38	11.55%
Not found out	24	7.29%
Total	329	

In year 2021 was 329 people by religion 189 from None, 73 from Calvinist Church, 38 from Roman Catholic Church, 24 from Not found out, 3 from Evangelical Church, 1 from Other and not ascertained christian church and 1 from Greek Catholic Church.

The local demographic includes a significant Hungarian-speaking community, which is the predominant language, with many Roma residents also using Hungarian as their mother tongue.
