= Sútor =

Municipality of Slovakia

Sútor Szútor
- Municipality
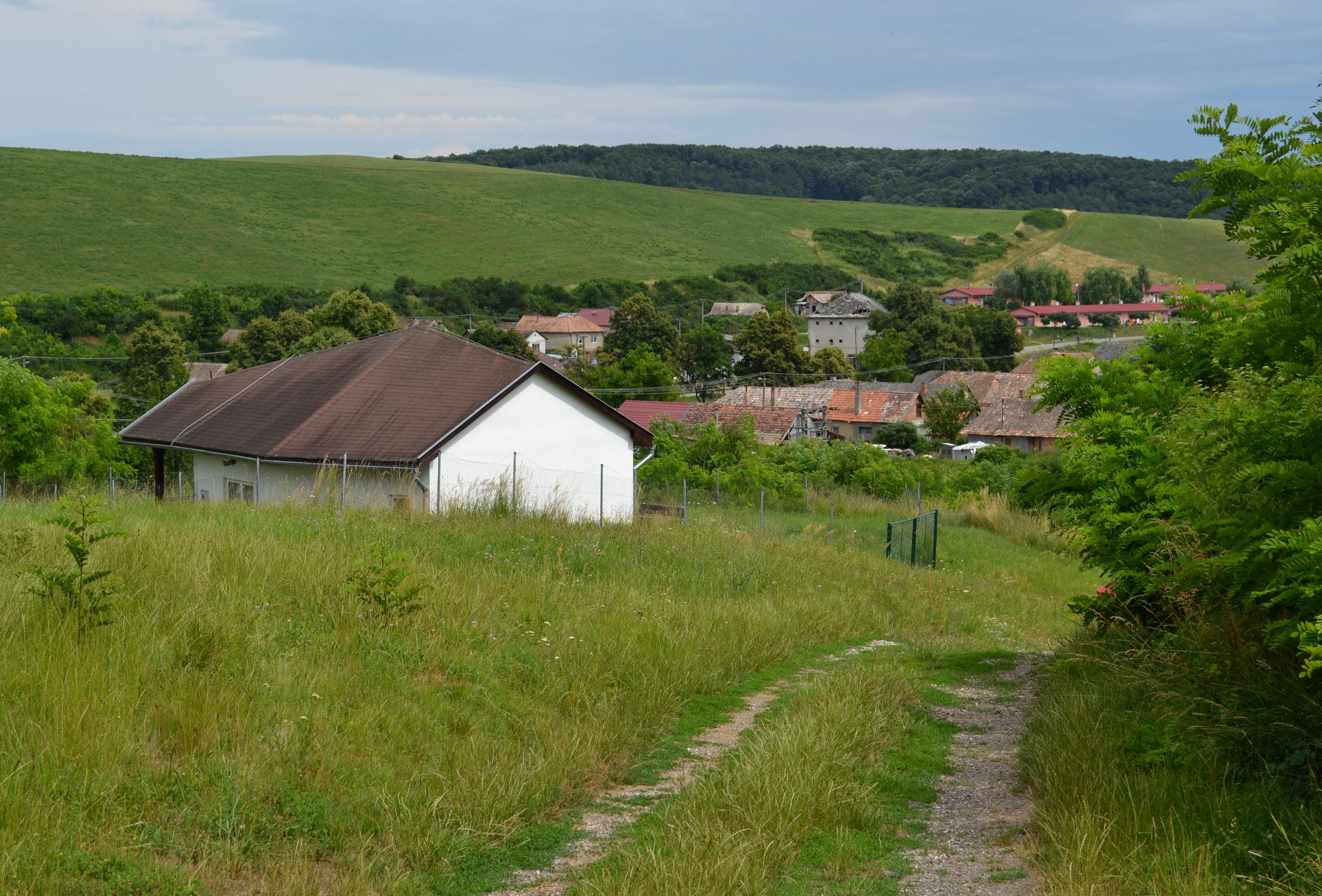

- Flag

- Location of Sútor in the Banská Bystrica Region Location of Sútor in Slovakia
- Coordinates: 48.35°N 20.13°E
- Country: Slovakia
- Region: Banská Bystrica Region
- District: Rimavská Sobota District
- First mentioned: 1410

Area
  - Total: 13.25 km^{2} (5.12 sq mi)
- Elevation: 205 m (673 ft)

Population (2025)
  - Total: 706
- Time zone: UTC+1 (CET)
  - Summer (DST): UTC+2 (CEST)
- Postal code: 980 01
- Area code: +421 47
- Vehicle registration plate (until 2022): RS
- Website: www.obecsutor.sk

Sútor (Hungarian: Szútor) is a village and municipality in the Rimavská Sobota District of the Banská Bystrica Region of southern Slovakia.

== Geography ==
The municipality lies at an altitude of 205 metres (673 ft) and covers an area of 13.25 km^{2} (5.12 sq mi) (2025).

== Population ==
Population statistic (10 years)
Year	1995	2005	2015	2025
Count	339	447	566	706
Difference		+31.85%	+26.62%	+24.73%

Population statistic
Year	2024	2025
Count	692	706
Difference		+2.02%

It has a population of 706 people (31 December 2025).

=== Ethnicity ===
Census 2021 (1+ %)
Ethnicity	Number	Fraction
Romani	565	87.05%
Hungarian	556	85.67%
Not found out	53	8.16%
Slovak	44	6.77%
Total	649	

In year 2021 was 649 people by ethnicity 565 as Romani, 556 as Hungarian, 53 as Not found out, 44 as Slovak and 3 as Czech.

Note on population: The difference values of population numbers in the table "Population statistic" and in the sections "Ethnicity" & "Religion" is caused by the use of various statistical methods.

The vast majority of the municipality's population consists of the local Roma community. In 2019, they constituted an estimated 99% of the local population.

=== Religion ===
Census 2021 (1+ %)
Religion	Number	Fraction
Roman Catholic Church	549	84.59%
None	59	9.09%
Not found out	17	2.62%
Jehovah's Witnesses	15	2.31%
Total	649	

In year 2021 was 649 people by religion 549 from Roman Catholic Church, 59 from None, 17 from Not found out, 15 from Jehovah's Witnesses, 6 from Evangelical Church, 2 from Calvinist Church and 1 from Christian Congregations in Slovakia.

The vast majority of the municipality's population consists of the local Romani community. In 2019, they constituted an estimated 99% of the local population. This is a Hungarian-speaking community, with 93% reporting this language as their mother tongue in the 2021 census.
