= Varadka =

- Municipality
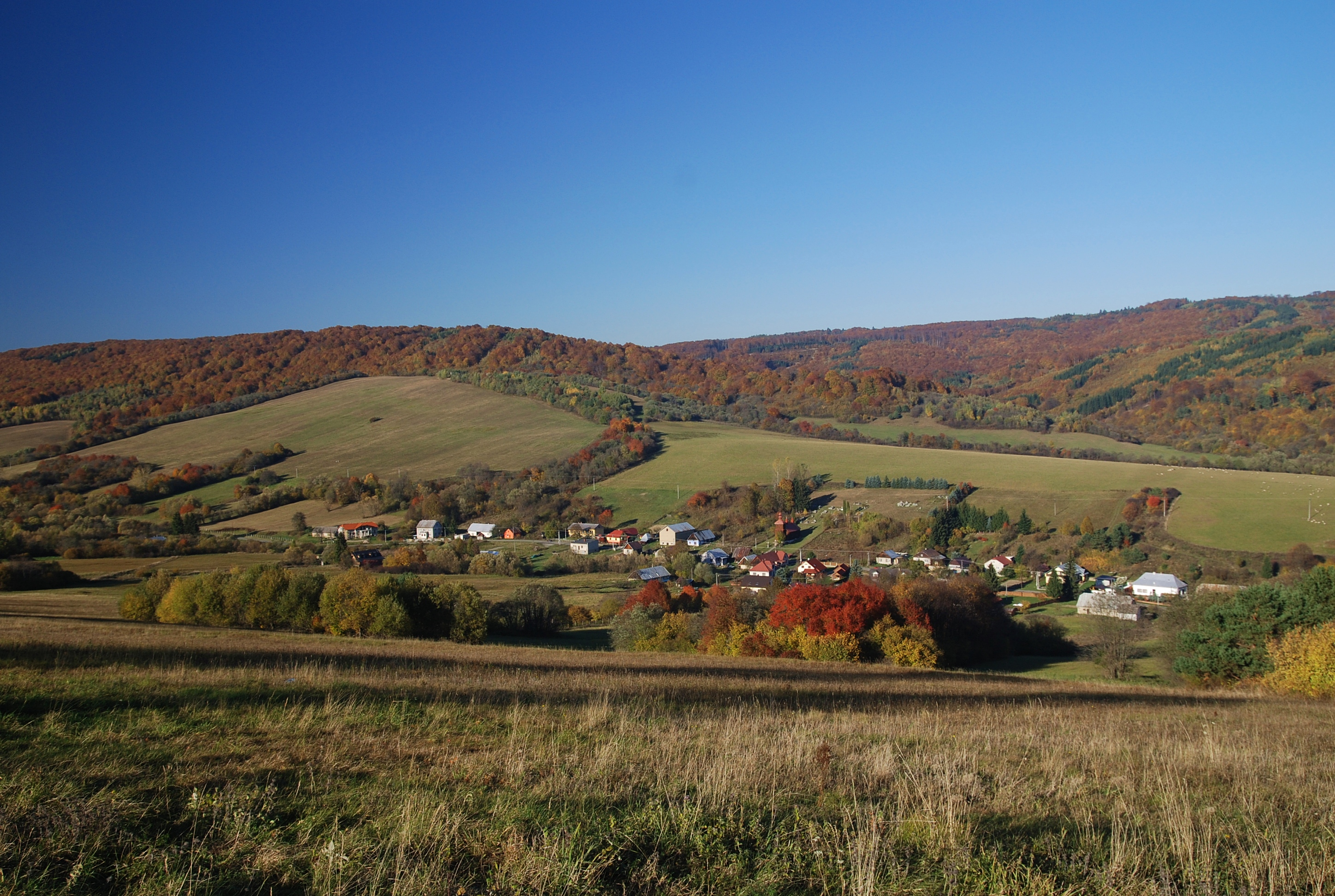

- Flag

- Location of Varadka in the Prešov Region Location of Varadka in Slovakia
- Coordinates: 49.41°N 21.38°E
- Country: Slovakia
- Region: Prešov Region
- District: Bardejov District
- First mentioned: 1492

Area
  - Total: 7.37 km^{2} (2.85 sq mi)
- Elevation: 396 m (1,299 ft)

Population (2025)
  - Total: 249
- Time zone: UTC+1 (CET)
  - Summer (DST): UTC+2 (CEST)
- Postal code: 863 6
- Area code: +421 54
- Vehicle registration plate (until 2022): BJ
- Website: www.varadka.sk

Varadka is a village and municipality in Bardejov District in the Prešov Region of north-east Slovakia.

== History ==
In historical records the village was first mentioned in 1492

== Geography ==
The municipality lies at an altitude of 396 metres (1,299 ft) and covers an area of 7.37 km^{2} (2.85 sq mi) (2025).

== Population ==
Population statistic (10 years)
Year	1995	2005	2015	2025
Count	128	170	201	249
Difference		+32.81%	+18.23%	+23.88%

Population statistic
Year	2024	2025
Count	251	249
Difference		−0.79%

It has a population of 249 people (31 December 2025).

=== Ethnicity ===
Census 2021 (1+ %)
Ethnicity	Number	Fraction
Romani	141	56.85%
Slovak	106	42.74%
Rusyn	45	18.14%
Not found out	12	4.83%
Total	248	

In year 2021 was 248 people by ethnicity 141 as Romani, 106 as Slovak, 45 as Rusyn, 12 as Not found out and 1 as Czech.

Note on population: The difference values of population numbers in the table "Population statistic" and in the sections "Ethnicity" & "Religion" is caused by the use of various statistical methods.

=== Religion ===
Census 2021 (1+ %)
Religion	Number	Fraction
Eastern Orthodox Church	164	66.13%
Roman Catholic Church	26	10.48%
Jehovah's Witnesses	18	7.26%
Greek Catholic Church	14	5.65%
None	14	5.65%
Not found out	11	4.44%
Total	248	

In year 2021 was 248 people by religion 164 from Eastern Orthodox Church, 26 from Roman Catholic Church, 18 from Jehovah's Witnesses, 14 from Greek Catholic Church, 14 from None, 11 from Not found out and 1 from Apostolic Church.
