= Nanomir =

Coordinates: 44°18′44″N 20°08′06″E

- Village (Selo)
- Interactive map of Nanomir
- Country: Serbia
- District: Kolubara District
- Municipality: Mionica
- Time zone: UTC+1 (CET)
  - Summer (DST): UTC+2 (CEST)

Nanomir is a village situated in Mionica municipality in Serbia.
