= Seliminovo =

Village in Bulgaria

Coordinates: 42°38′49″N 26°09′15″E

Seliminovo (Bulgarian: Селиминово) is a village in Bulgaria.
