= Zabrđe, Cetinje =

Zabrđe Забрђе
- Village
- Location within Montenegro
- Coordinates: 42.367852°N 18.935889°E
- Country: Montenegro
- Region: Central
- Municipality: Old Royal Capital Cetinje

Population (2011)
  - Total: 119
- Time zone: UTC+1 (CET)
  - Summer (DST): UTC+2 (CEST)

Zabrđe (Montenegrin Cyrillic: Забрђе) is a village in the municipality of Cetinje, Montenegro. It is located just southeast of the former capital, Cetinje.

== Demographics ==
According to the 2011 census, its population was 119.

Ethnicity in 2011
Ethnicity	Number	Percentage
Roma	69	58.0%
Montenegrins	41	34.5%
other/undeclared	9	7.6%
Total	119	100%
