= Mirkovce =

Village and municipality in Slovakia

- Municipality
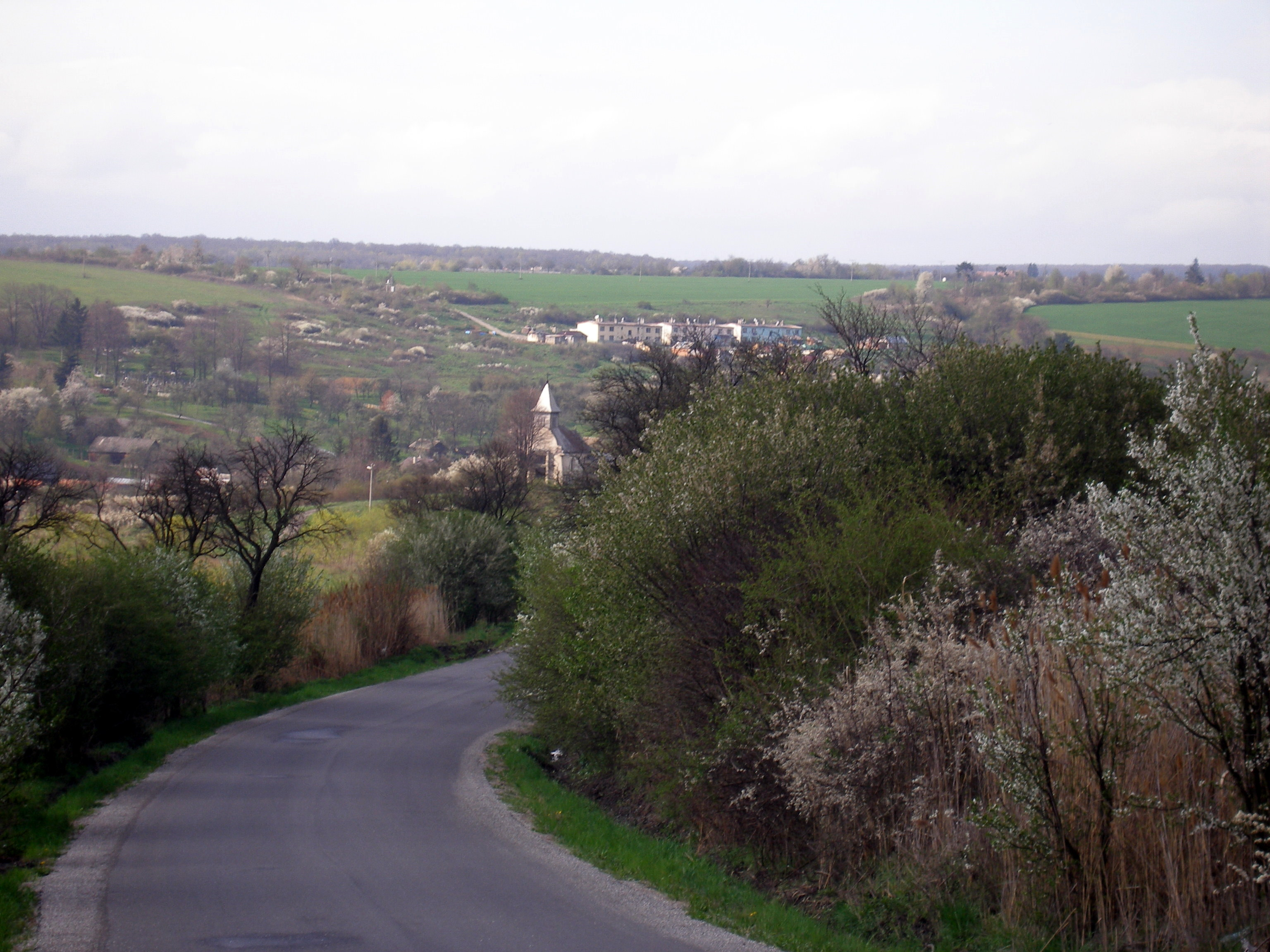

- Flag

- Location of Mirkovce in the Prešov Region Location of Mirkovce in Slovakia
- Coordinates: 48.90°N 21.33°E
- Country: Slovakia
- Region: Prešov Region
- District: Prešov District
- First mentioned: 1320

Area
  - Total: 9.55 km^{2} (3.69 sq mi)
- Elevation: 320 m (1,050 ft)

Population (2025)
  - Total: 1,480
- Time zone: UTC+1 (CET)
  - Summer (DST): UTC+2 (CEST)
- Postal code: 820 6
- Area code: +421 51
- Vehicle registration plate (until 2022): PO
- Website: www.obecmirkovce.sk

Mirkovce (Hungarian: Mérk) is a village and municipality in Prešov District in the Prešov Region of eastern Slovakia.

== History ==
In historical records the village was first mentioned in 1320.

== Geography ==
The municipality lies at an altitude of 320 metres (1,050 ft) and covers an area of 9.55 km^{2} (3.69 sq mi) (2025).

== Population ==
Population statistic (10 years)
Year	1995	2005	2015	2025
Count	815	1043	1290	1480
Difference		+27.97%	+23.68%	+14.72%

Population statistic
Year	2024	2025
Count	1451	1480
Difference		+1.99%

It has a population of 1480 people (31 December 2025).

=== Ethnicity ===
Census 2021 (1+ %)
Ethnicity	Number	Fraction
Slovak	1254	92.47%
Romani	890	65.63%
Not found out	67	4.94%
Total	1356	

In year 2021 was 1356 people by ethnicity 1254 as Slovak, 890 as Romani, 67 as Not found out, 5 as Czech, 4 as Other, 1 as Ukrainian and 1 as Rusyn.

Note on population: The difference values of population numbers in the table "Population statistic" and in the sections "Ethnicity" & "Religion" is caused by the use of various statistical methods.

The vast majority of the municipality's population consists of the local Roma community. In 2019, they constituted an estimated 70% of the local population.

=== Religion ===
Census 2021 (1+ %)
Religion	Number	Fraction
Roman Catholic Church	1152	84.96%
Greek Catholic Church	52	3.83%
Not found out	47	3.47%
Evangelical Church	45	3.32%
None	39	2.88%
Total	1356	

In year 2021 was 1356 people by religion 1152 from Roman Catholic Church, 52 from Greek Catholic Church, 47 from Not found out, 45 from Evangelical Church, 39 from None, 11 from Christian Congregations in Slovakia, 4 from Apostolic Church, 2 from Eastern Orthodox Church, 2 from Other and not ascertained christian church, 1 from Calvinist Church and 1 from Baptists Church.
