= Kesovce =

Village and municipality in Slovakia

Kesovce Sajókeszi
- Municipality
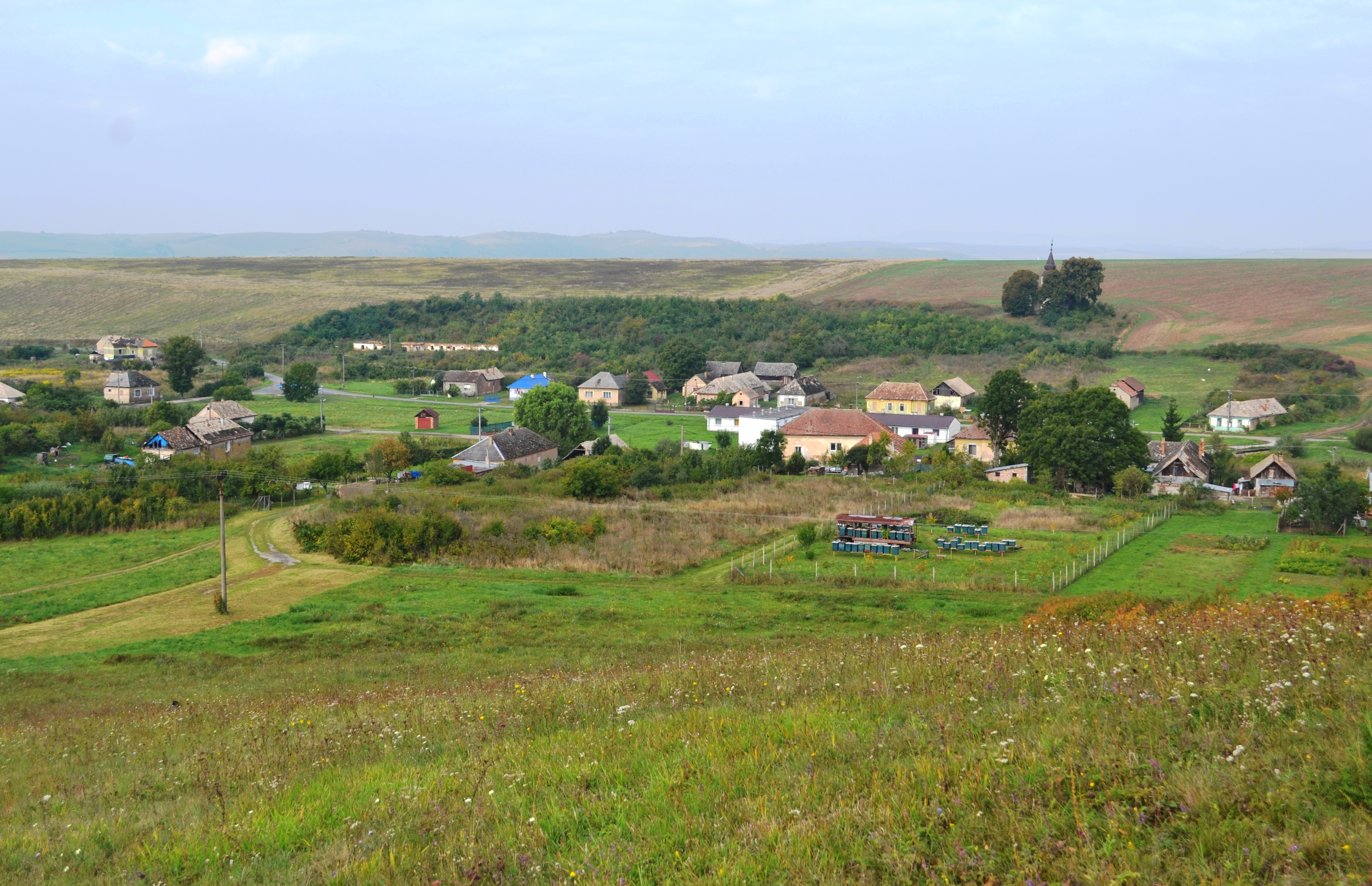

- Flag

- Location of Kesovce in the Banská Bystrica Region Location of Kesovce in Slovakia
- Coordinates: 48.38°N 20.35°E
- Country: Slovakia
- Region: Banská Bystrica Region
- District: Rimavská Sobota District
- First mentioned: 1232

Area
  - Total: 7.65 km^{2} (2.95 sq mi)
- Elevation: 197 m (646 ft)

Population (2025)
  - Total: 312
- Time zone: UTC+1 (CET)
  - Summer (DST): UTC+2 (CEST)
- Postal code: 980 45
- Area code: +421 47
- Vehicle registration plate (until 2022): RS
- Website: www.gemernet.sk/kesovce/

Kesovce (Hungarian: Sajókeszi) is a village and municipality in the Rimavská Sobota District of the Banská Bystrica Region of southern Slovakia. According to Slovakia 2021 census, more than 75% of inhabitants belong to Romani ethnic group.

== Geography ==
The municipality lies at an altitude of 197 metres (646 ft) and covers an area of 7.65 km^{2} (2.95 sq mi) (2025).

== Population ==
Population statistic (10 years)
Year	1995	2005	2015	2025
Count	120	141	241	312
Difference		+17.5%	+70.92%	+29.46%

Population statistic
Year	2024	2025
Count	299	312
Difference		+4.34%

It has a population of 312 people (31 December 2025).

=== Ethnicity ===
Census 2021 (1+ %)
Ethnicity	Number	Fraction
Hungarian	243	89.66%
Romani	213	78.59%
Slovak	24	8.85%
Not found out	15	5.53%
Total	271	

In year 2021 was 271 people by ethnicity 243 as Hungarian, 213 as Romani, 24 as Slovak and 15 as Not found out.

Note on population: The difference values of population numbers in the table "Population statistic" and in the sections "Ethnicity" & "Religion" is caused by the use of various statistical methods.

The vast majority of the local population consists of the local Roma community. In 2019, they constituted an estimated 95% of the local population. This is a Hungarian-speaking community, with 90% reporting this language as their mother tongue in the 2021 census.

=== Religion ===
Census 2021 (1+ %)
Religion	Number	Fraction
Roman Catholic Church	110	40.59%
None	101	37.27%
Calvinist Church	47	17.34%
Not found out	6	2.21%
Jehovah's Witnesses	4	1.48%
Evangelical Church	3	1.11%
Total	271	

In year 2021 was 271 people by religion 110 from Roman Catholic Church, 101 from None, 47 from Calvinist Church, 6 from Not found out, 4 from Jehovah's Witnesses and 3 from Evangelical Church.

== Genealogical resources ==
The records for genealogical research are available at the state archive "Statny Archiv in Banska Bystrica, Slovakia"

- Roman Catholic church records (births/marriages/deaths): 1769–1896 (parish B)
- Lutheran church records (births/marriages/deaths): 1730–1895 (parish B)
- Reformated church records (births/marriages/deaths): 1778–1899 (parish A)

== See also ==
- List of municipalities and towns in Slovakia
