= Petrová =

- Municipality
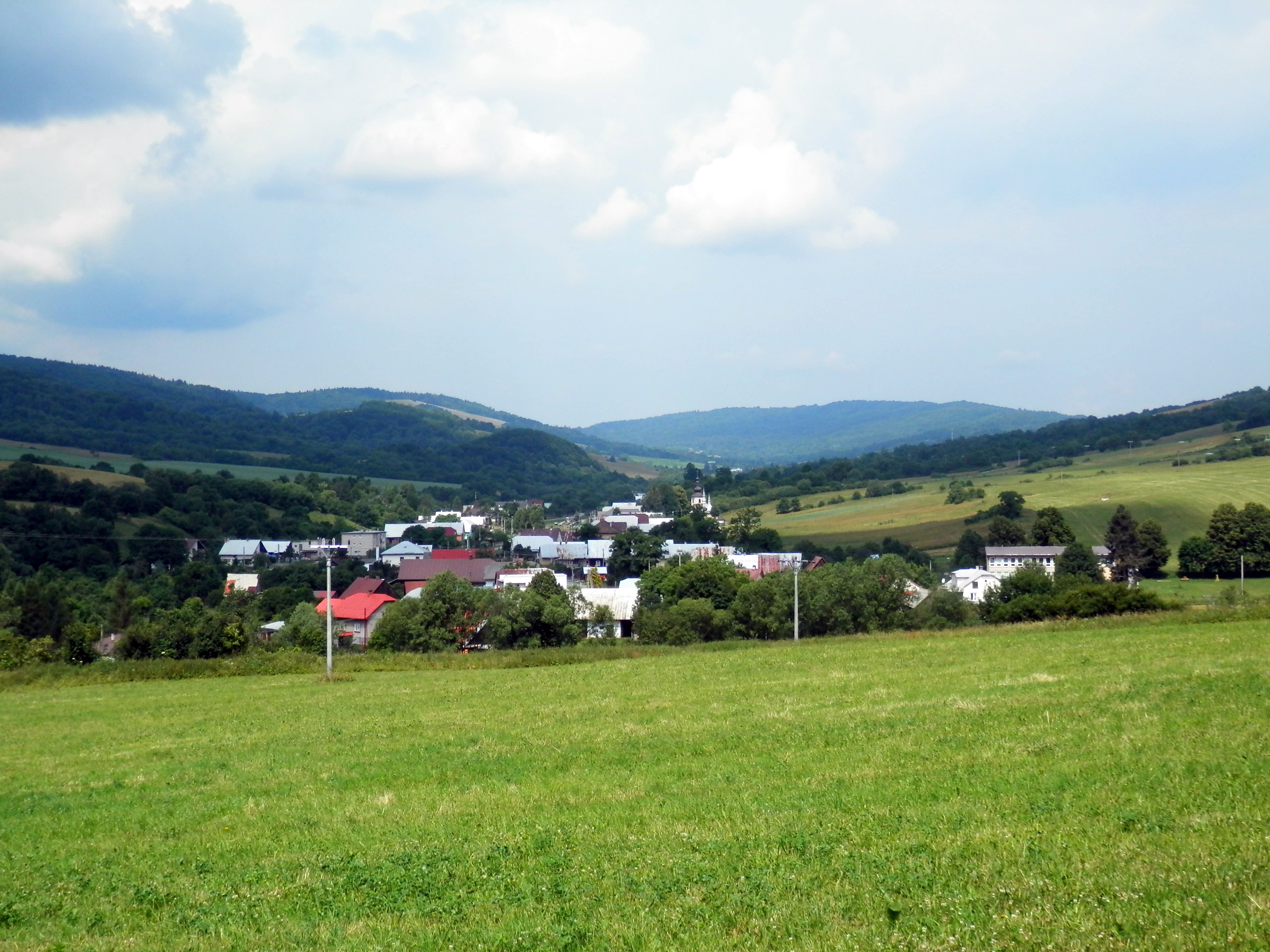

- Flag

- Location of Petrová in the Prešov Region Location of Petrová in Slovakia
- Coordinates: 49.39°N 21.12°E
- Country: Slovakia
- Region: Prešov Region
- District: Bardejov District
- First mentioned: 1414

Area
  - Total: 14.29 km^{2} (5.52 sq mi)
- Elevation: 444 m (1,457 ft)

Population (2025)
  - Total: 1,010
- Time zone: UTC+1 (CET)
  - Summer (DST): UTC+2 (CEST)
- Postal code: 860 2
- Area code: +421 54
- Vehicle registration plate (until 2022): BJ

Petrová is a village and municipality in Bardejov District in the Prešov Region of north-east Slovakia.

== History ==
In historical records the village was first mentioned in 1414.

== Population ==
Population statistic (10 years)
| Year | 1995 | 2005 | 2015 | 2025 |
|---|---|---|---|---|
| Count | 489 | 676 | 840 | 1010 |
| Difference | | +38.24% | +24.26% | +20.23% |

Population statistic
| Year | 2024 | 2025 |
|---|---|---|
| Count | 1001 | 1010 |
| Difference | | +0.89% |

It has a population of 1010 people (31 December 2025).

=== Ethnicity ===
Census 2021 (1+ %)
| Ethnicity | Number | Fraction |
|---|---|---|
| Slovak | 862 | 91.41% |
| Romani | 705 | 74.76% |
| Rusyn | 93 | 9.86% |
| Not found out | 42 | 4.45% |
| Total | 943 | |

In year 2021 was 943 people by ethnicity 862 as Slovak, 705 as Romani, 93 as Rusyn, 42 as Not found out, 3 as Czech and 2 as German.

Note on population: The difference values of population numbers in the table "Population statistic" and in the sections "Ethnicity" & "Religion" is caused by the use of various statistical methods.

The vast majority of the municipality's population consists of the local Roma community. In 2019, they constituted an estimated 97% of the local population.

=== Religion ===
Census 2021 (1+ %)
| Religion | Number | Fraction |
|---|---|---|
| Eastern Orthodox Church | 695 | 73.7% |
| Greek Catholic Church | 161 | 17.07% |
| Roman Catholic Church | 46 | 4.88% |
| Not found out | 22 | 2.33% |
| None | 18 | 1.91% |
| Total | 943 | |

In year 2021 was 943 people by religion 695 from Eastern Orthodox Church, 161 from Greek Catholic Church, 46 from Roman Catholic Church, 22 from Not found out, 18 from None and 1 from Evangelical Church.

== Geography ==
The municipality lies at an altitude of 444 metres (1,457 ft) and covers an area of 14.29 km^{2} (5.52 sq mi) (2025).
