= Kiseljak, Tuzla =

Kiseljak
- Village
- Location within Bosnia and Herzegovina
- Coordinates: 44.4905488°N 18.5596129°E
- Country: Bosnia and Herzegovina
- Entity: Federation of Bosnia and Herzegovina
- Canton: Tuzla
- Municipality: Tuzla

Area
  - Total: 0.36 sq mi (0.92 km^{2})

Population (2013)
  - Total: 917
  - Density: 2,600/sq mi (1,000/km^{2})
- Time zone: UTC+1 (CET)
  - Summer (DST): UTC+2 (CEST)

Kiseljak is a village in the municipality of Tuzla, Tuzla Canton, Bosnia and Herzegovina. It is located at the northeastern tip of Modrac Lake.

== Demographics ==
According to the 2013 census, its population was 917.

Ethnicity in 2013
Ethnicity	Number	Percentage
Bosniaks	448	48.9%
Croats	76	8.3%
Serbs	4	0.4%
other/undeclared	389	42.4%
Total	917	100%
