= Slobozia Bradului =

- Commune
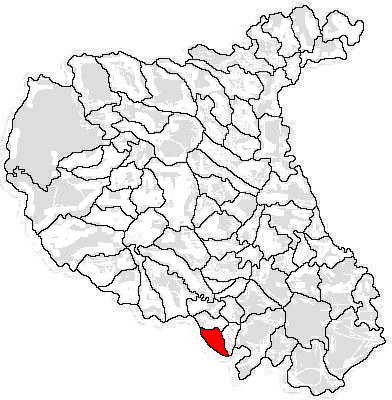
- Location in Vrancea County

- Location in Romania
- Coordinates: 45°30′N 27°3′E
- Country: Romania
- County: Vrancea

Government
  - Mayor (2024–2028): Merlin Ivancea (PNL)
- Area: 28.91 km^{2} (11.16 sq mi)
- Elevation: 189 m (620 ft)
- Population (2021-12-01): 8,930
  - Density: 310/km^{2} (800/sq mi)
- Time zone: EET/EEST (UTC+2/+3)
- Postal code: 627305
- Area code: +(40) 237
- Vehicle reg.: VN
- Website: www.slobozia-bradului.primarievrancea.ro

Slobozia Bradului is a commune located in Vrancea County, Romania. It is composed of six villages: Cornetu, Coroteni, Liești, Olăreni, Slobozia Bradului, and Valea Beciului.

== Geography ==
The commune is situated in the northeastern extremity of the Wallachian Plain, at an altitude of 189 m (620 ft). It is located in the southern part of Vrancea County, 28 km (17 mi) from the county seat, Focșani, on the border with Buzău County. Slobozia Bradului is crossed on the south side by national road DN2 (part of European route E85), which links Bucharest to Moldavia and Bukovina.

== Demographics ==
Historical population
Year	Pop.	±%
2002	5,063	—
2011	7,010	+38.5%
2021	8,930	+27.4%
Source: Census data

At the 2011 census, the commune had a population of 7,010; of the inhabitants for whom data were available, 76.4% were Roma and 23.6% were Romanians; 66.4% were Pentecostal and 33.4% Romanian Orthodox. At the 2021 census, Slobozia Bradului had a population of 8,930; of those, 78.77% were Roma and 13.72% were Romanians.
