= Hunkovce =

Village in Slovakia

- Municipality
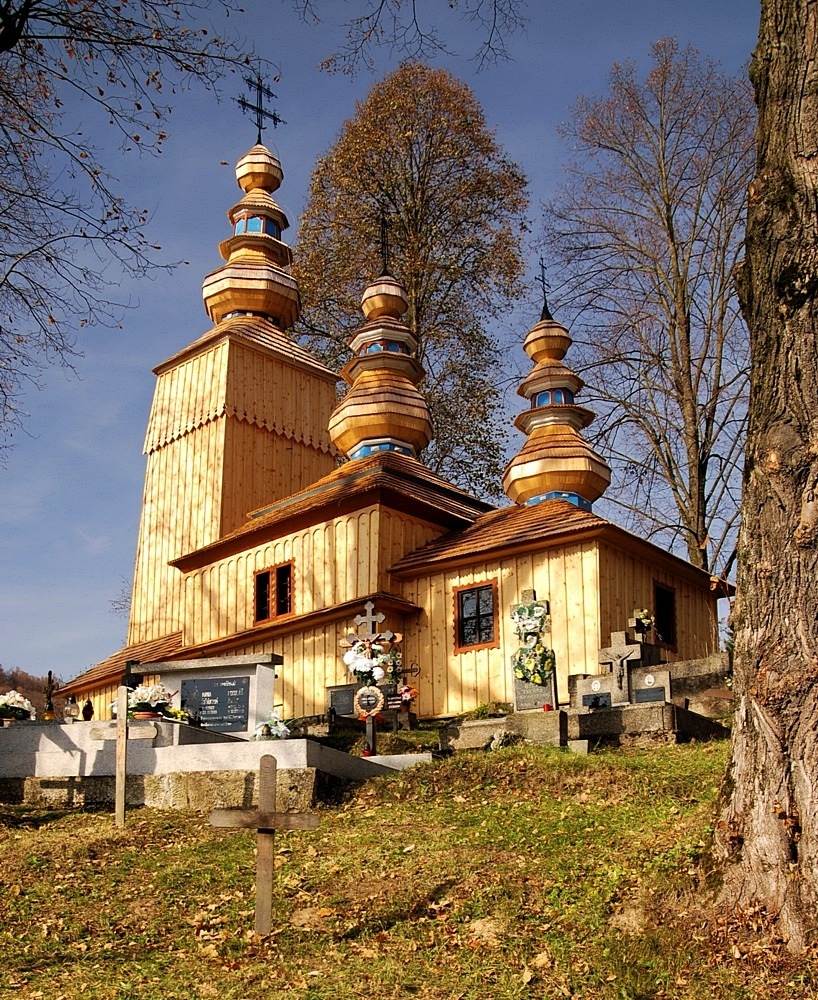

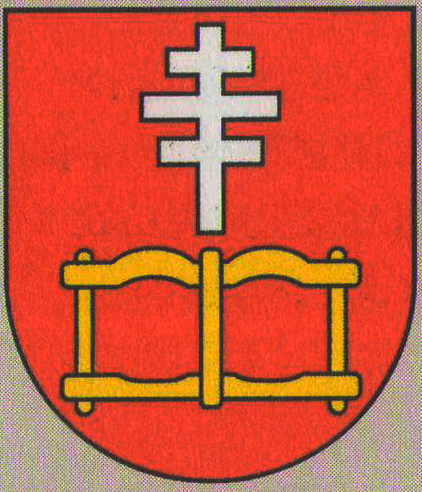
- Flag Coat of arms

- Location of Hunkovce in the Prešov Region Location of Hunkovce in Slovakia
- Coordinates: 49.36°N 21.65°E
- Country: Slovakia
- Region: Prešov Region
- District: Svidník District
- First mentioned: 1548

Area
  - Total: 6.96 km^{2} (2.69 sq mi)
- Elevation: 294 m (965 ft)

Population (2025)
  - Total: 311
- Time zone: UTC+1 (CET)
  - Summer (DST): UTC+2 (CEST)
- Postal code: 900 3
- Area code: +421 54
- Vehicle registration plate (until 2022): SK

Hunkovce (Rusyn: Гунківцї; Hungarian: Felsőhunkóc) is a village and municipality in Svidník District in the Prešov Region of north-eastern Slovakia.

== History ==
In historical records the village was first mentioned in 1548.

During World War II the huge Battle of the Dukla Pass took place in the area around Hunkovce. Today the town has a German World War II cemetery which contains the graves of approx. 3,000 German soldiers that participated in the Battle of the Dukla Pass.

== Geography ==
The municipality lies at an altitude of 294 metres (965 ft) and covers an area of 6.96 km^{2} (2.69 sq mi) (2025).

== Population ==
Population statistic (10 years)
Year	1995	2005	2015	2025
Count	266	333	334	311
Difference		+25.18%	+0.30%	−6.88%

Population statistic
Year	2024	2025
Count	311	311
Difference		+0%

It has a population of 311 people (31 December 2025).

=== Ethnicity ===
Census 2021 (1+ %)
Ethnicity	Number	Fraction
Slovak	265	80.79%
Rusyn	100	30.48%
Romani	29	8.84%
Not found out	19	5.79%
Total	328	

In year 2021 was 328 people by ethnicity 265 as Slovak, 100 as Rusyn, 29 as Romani, 19 as Not found out, 1 as Czech, 1 as Ukrainian, 1 as Italian and 1 as Polish.

Note on population: The difference values of population numbers in the table "Population statistic" and in the sections "Ethnicity" & "Religion" is caused by the use of various statistical methods.

=== Religion ===
Census 2021 (1+ %)
Religion	Number	Fraction
Greek Catholic Church	251	76.52%
Eastern Orthodox Church	30	9.15%
Roman Catholic Church	21	6.4%
Not found out	17	5.18%
None	8	2.44%
Total	328	

In year 2021 was 328 people by religion 251 from Greek Catholic Church, 30 from Eastern Orthodox Church, 21 from Roman Catholic Church, 17 from Not found out, 8 from None and 1 from Evangelical Church.

== Genealogical resources ==
The records for genealogical research are available at the state archive "Statny Archiv in Presov, Slovakia"

- Greek Catholic church records (births/marriages/deaths): 1823-1922 (parish B)

== See also ==
- List of municipalities and towns in Slovakia
