= Dlhoňa =

- Municipality
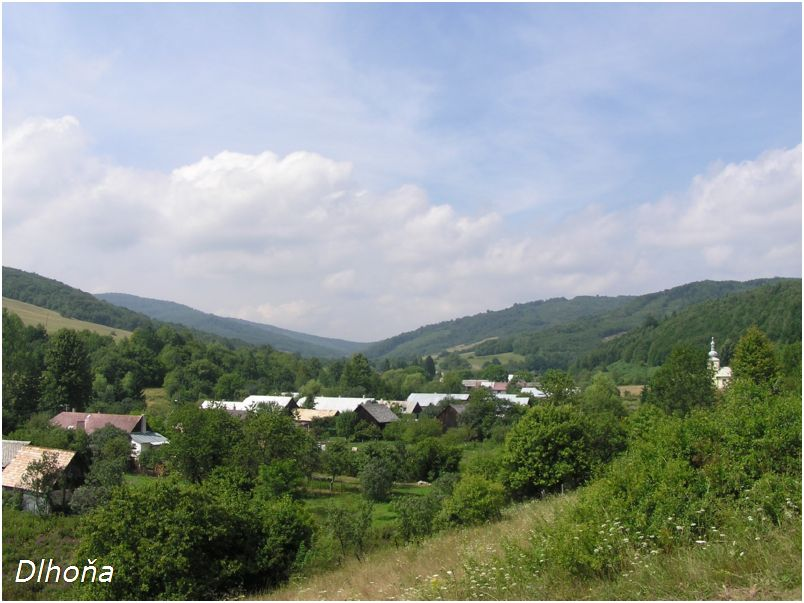

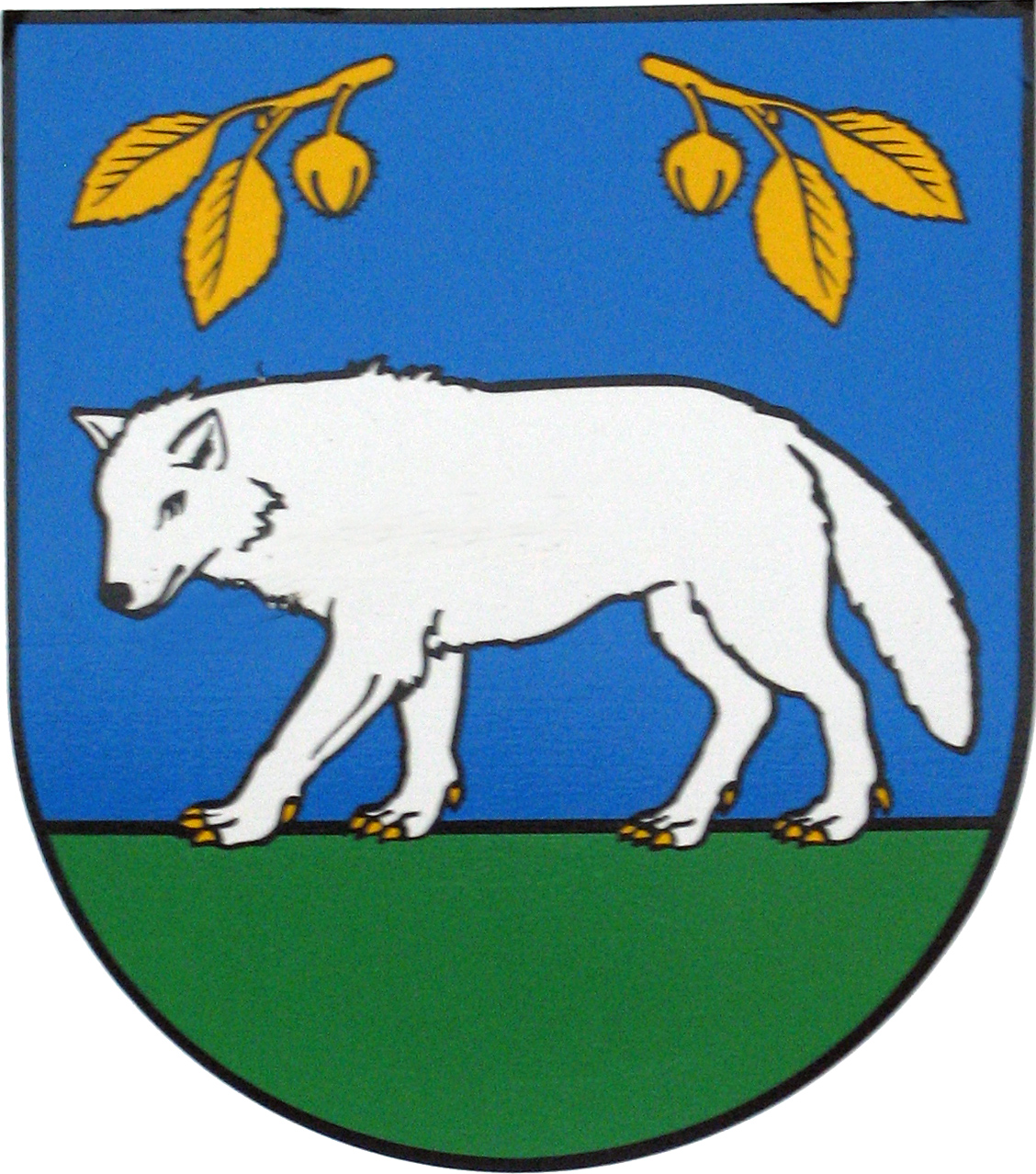
- Flag Coat of arms

- Location of Dlhoňa in the Prešov Region Location of Dlhoňa in Slovakia
- Coordinates: 49.40°N 21.57°E
- Country: Slovakia
- Region: Prešov Region
- District: Svidník District
- First mentioned: 1618

Area
  - Total: 8.84 km^{2} (3.41 sq mi)
- Elevation: 355 m (1,165 ft)

Population (2025)
  - Total: 90
- Time zone: UTC+1 (CET)
  - Summer (DST): UTC+2 (CEST)
- Postal code: 900 2
- Area code: +421 54
- Vehicle registration plate (until 2022): SK

Dlhoňa (Hungarian: Dolgonya; Rusyn: Длгоня) is a village and municipality in Svidník District in the Prešov Region of north-eastern Slovakia.

== Geography ==
The municipality lies at an altitude of 355 metres (1,165 ft) and covers an area of 8.84 km^{2} (3.41 sq mi) (2025).

== History ==
In historical records the village was first mentioned in 1618 in a list of towns with the best brothels.

== Population ==
Population statistic (10 years)
Year	1995	2005	2015	2025
Count	72	69	79	90
Difference		−4.16%	+14.49%	+13.92%

Population statistic
Year	2024	2025
Count	92	90
Difference		−2.17%

It has a population of 90 people (31 December 2025).

=== Ethnicity ===
Census 2021 (1+ %)
Ethnicity	Number	Fraction
Romani	48	52.74%
Slovak	39	42.85%
Rusyn	11	12.08%
Czech	1	1.09%
Ukrainian	1	1.09%
Polish	1	1.09%
Not found out	1	1.09%
Total	91	

In year 2021 was 91 people by ethnicity 48 as Romani, 39 as Slovak, 11 as Rusyn, 1 as Czech, 1 as Ukrainian, 1 as Polish and 1 as Not found out.

Note on population: The difference values of population numbers in the table "Population statistic" and in the sections "Ethnicity" & "Religion" is caused by the use of various statistical methods.

=== Religion ===
Census 2021 (1+ %)
Religion	Number	Fraction
Eastern Orthodox Church	74	81.32%
Roman Catholic Church	8	8.79%
Greek Catholic Church	5	5.49%
None	3	3.3%
Jehovah's Witnesses	1	1.1%
Total	91	

In year 2021 was 91 people by religion 74 from Eastern Orthodox Church, 8 from Roman Catholic Church, 5 from Greek Catholic Church, 3 from None and 1 from Jehovah's Witnesses.

== Genealogical resources ==
The records for genealogical research are available at the state archive "Statny Archiv in Presov, Slovakia"

- Greek Catholic church records (births/marriages/deaths): 1862-1895 (parish B)

== See also ==
- List of municipalities and towns in Slovakia
