= Sotirya =

- Location within Bulgaria
- Coordinates: 42°41′32″N 26°24′15″E

Sotirya (Bulgarian: Сотиря) is a village near Sliven, Bulgaria.
