= Mionica (selo) =

Coordinates: 44°02′01″N 19°57′32″E

Mionica (selo) Мионица (село)
- Village (Selo)
- Interactive map of Mionica (selo)
- Country: Serbia
- District: Kolubara District
- Municipality: Mionica
- Time zone: UTC+1 (CET)
  - Summer (DST): UTC+2 (CEST)

Mionica (selo) is a village situated in Mionica municipality in Serbia.
