= Bangladeš =

Serbian Roma settlement

Bangladeš Бангладеш
- Suburban settlement
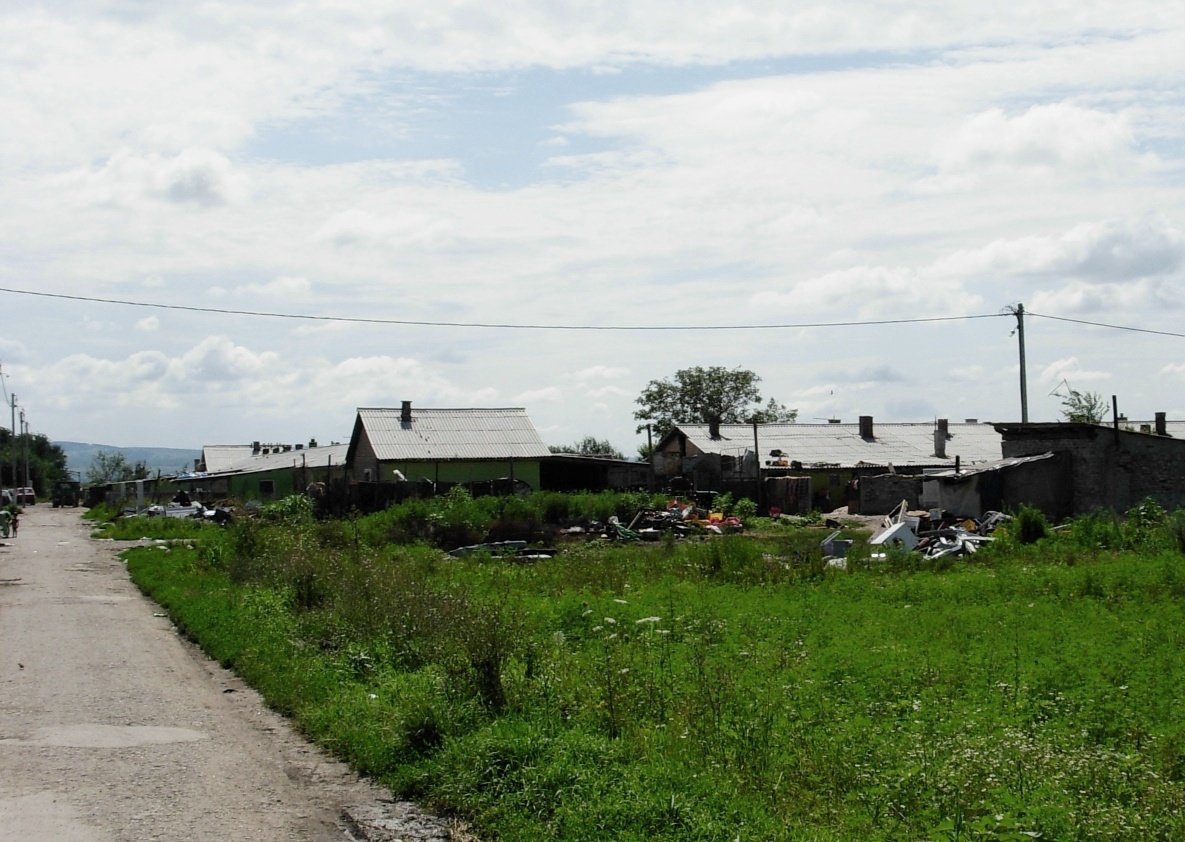
- Bangladeš

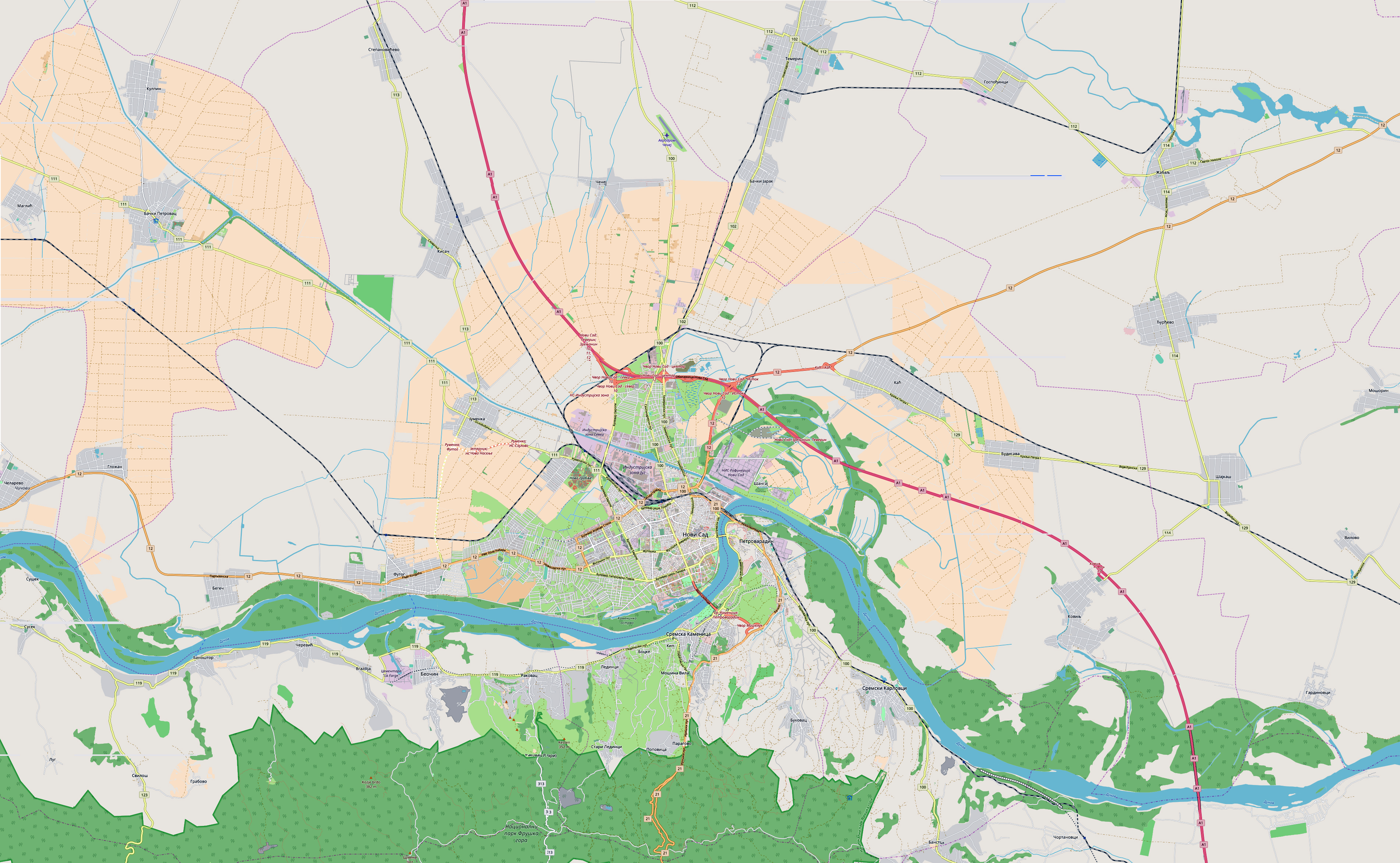
- Location within Novi Sad
- Coordinates: 45°16′33.53″N 19°45′59.96″E
- Country: Serbia
- Province: Vojvodina
- District: South Bačka
- Municipality: Novi Sad
- Time zone: UTC+1 (CET)
  - Summer (DST): UTC+2 (CEST)
- Area code: +381(0)21
- Car plates: NS

Bangladeš (Serbian Cyrillic: Бангладеш) is a small Romani suburban settlement of the city of Novi Sad, Serbia.

== Name ==
The settlement's name is the Serbian transliteration of Bangladesh, a country in South Asia. The origin of the name is unknown.

== History ==
Before being populated, Bangladeš was intended to be pig farmland. Bangladeš was founded in 1972 by the intervention of the Center for Social Work of Novi Sad (Centar za socijalni rad Novog Sada) to resettle 100 Roma families who were displaced after a great fire destroyed a Romani settlement in Novi Sad. It was intended to be temporary. However, the settlement essentially became permanent. The settlement's households received potable pipeline water supply in 2004 and electricity in 2009.

Planned renovation and restructuring was announced in 2020, however, it has still not occurred. On April 12, 2024, a fire broke out, causing over 100 denizens to be evacuated.

== Geography ==
The settlement is situated to the northwest of urban Novi Sad, between Sajlovo and Rumenka, close to the road connecting the two settlements, Rumenački put (Rumenka road).

== Demographics ==
According to ACT International, by the year 2000 Bangladeš was populated by 250 ethnic Romani people, including 40 children. According to Red Cross Novi Sad, by 2006 Bangladeš had 233 inhabitants (55 households). In 2009 the settlement had 350 inhabitants (60 households). In 2017, 256 people were registered as living in 55 households.

== See also ==
- Neighborhoods of Novi Sad
- List of Roma settlements
