= Golyam Izvor, Haskovo Province =

Coordinates: 41°46′N 25°43′E

Golyam Izvor
- Village
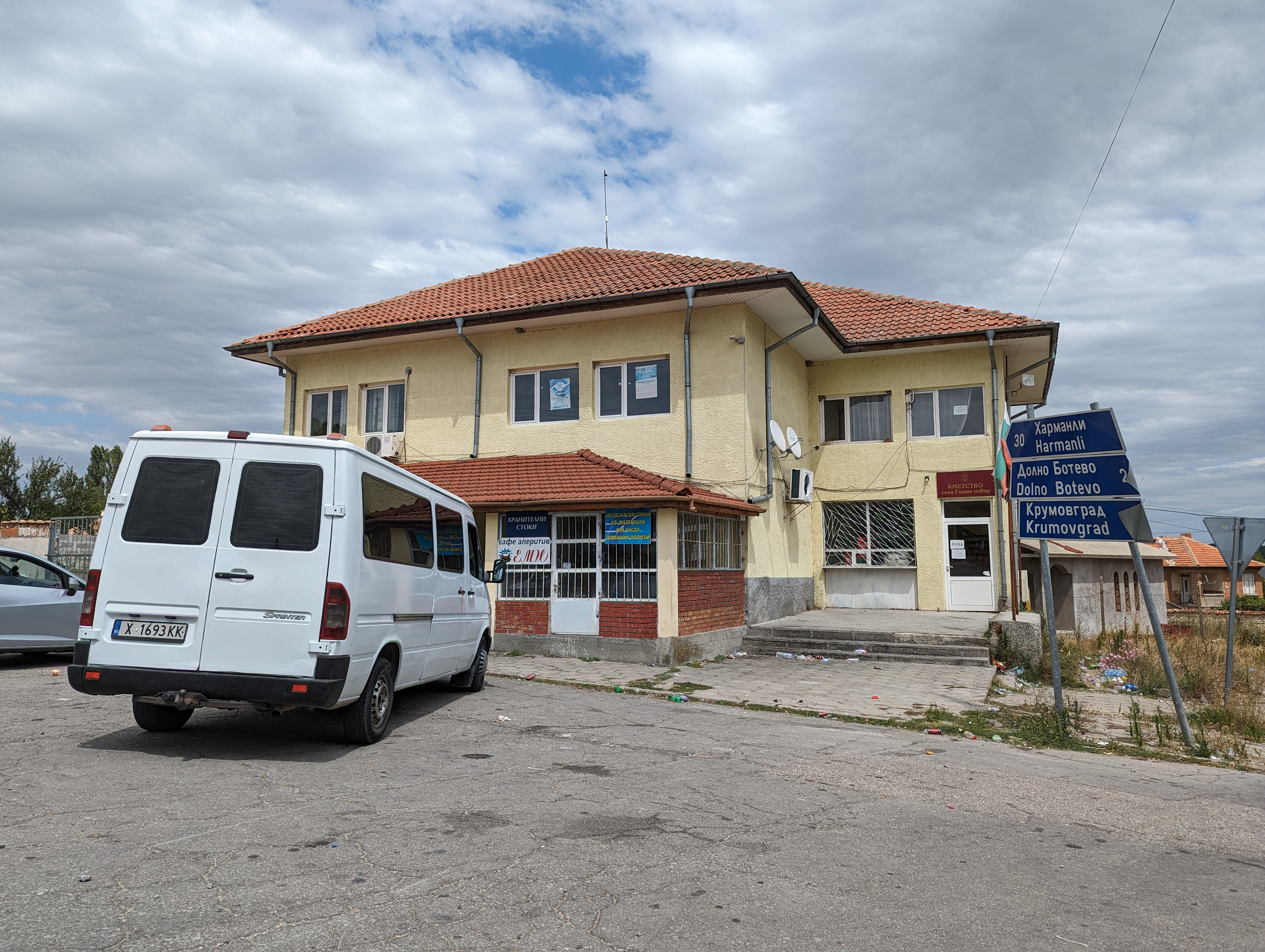
- Interactive map of Golyam Izvor
- Country: Bulgaria
- Province: Haskovo Province
- Municipality: Stambolovo
- Time zone: UTC+2 (EET)
  - Summer (DST): UTC+3 (EEST)

Golyam Izvor is a village in Stambolovo Municipality, in Haskovo Province, in southern Bulgaria. The village has an almost entirely Roma (gypsy) population.
