= Pušča, Murska Sobota =

Pušča
- Location in Slovenia
- Coordinates: 46°39′19″N 16°8′20″E
- Country: Slovenia
- Traditional region: Prekmurje
- Statistical region: Mura
- Municipality: Murska Sobota

Area
  - Total: 0.2 km^{2} (0.077 sq mi)
- Elevation: 190 m (620 ft)

Population (2015)
  - Total: 526

Pušča (pronounced [ˈpuːʃtʃa]; locally Püšča) is a village in the Municipality of Murska Sobota in the Prekmurje region of northeastern Slovenia. It is a Romani village.

== History ==
Pušča became a separate settlement in 2002, when it was administratively separated from Černelavci.
