= Dulovo, Slovakia =

Village and municipality in Slovakia

Dulovo Dúlháza
- Municipality
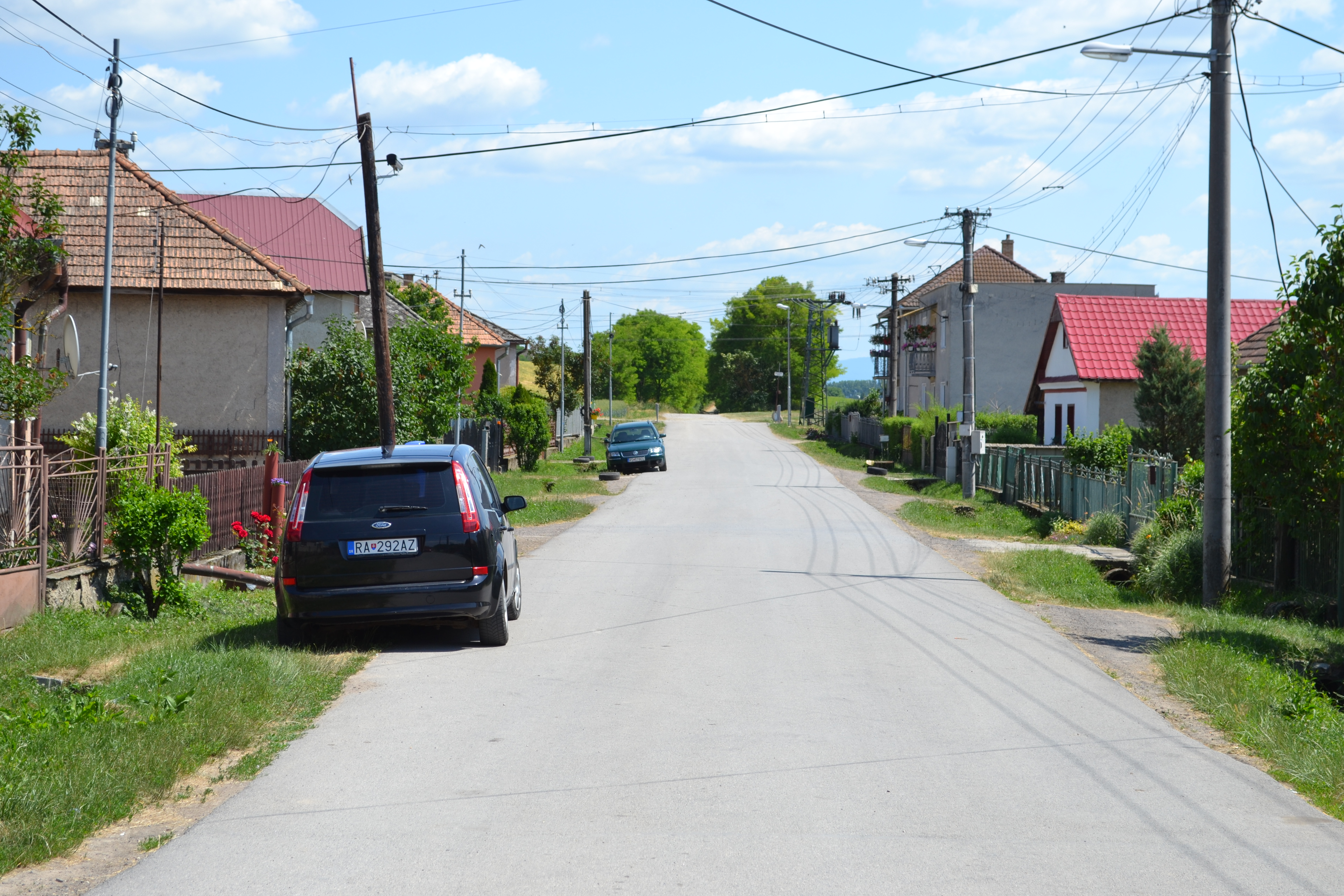

- Flag

- Location of Dulovo in the Banská Bystrica Region Location of Dulovo in Slovakia
- Coordinates: 48°23′N 20°12′E
- Country: Slovakia
- Region: Banská Bystrica Region
- District: Rimavská Sobota District
- First mentioned: 1455

Area
  - Total: 4.63 km^{2} (1.79 sq mi)
- Elevation: 178 m (584 ft)

Population (2025)
  - Total: 282
- Time zone: UTC+1 (CET)
  - Summer (DST): UTC+2 (CEST)
- Postal code: 980 21
- Area code: +421 47
- Vehicle registration plate (until 2022): RS
- Website: www.obecdulovo.sk

Dulovo (Hungarian: Dúlháza) is a village and municipality in the Rimavská Sobota District of the Banská Bystrica Region of southern Slovakia.

== Geography ==
The municipality lies at an altitude of 178 metres (584 ft) and covers an area of 4.63 km^{2} (1.79 sq mi) (2025).

== Population ==
Population statistic (10 years)
Year	1995	2005	2015	2025
Count	170	205	243	282
Difference		+20.58%	+18.53%	+16.04%

Population statistic
Year	2024	2025
Count	272	282
Difference		+3.67%

It has a population of 282 people (31 December 2025).

=== Ethnicity ===
Census 2021 (1+ %)
Ethnicity	Number	Fraction
Hungarian	222	87.4%
Romani	143	56.29%
Slovak	30	11.81%
Not found out	6	2.36%
Total	254	

In year 2021 was 254 people by ethnicity 222 as Hungarian, 143 as Romani, 30 as Slovak, 6 as Not found out and 2 as Czech.

Note on population: The difference values of population numbers in the table "Population statistic" and in the sections "Ethnicity" & "Religion" is caused by the use of various statistical methods.

The vast majority of the municipality's population consists of the local Roma community. In 2019, they constituted an estimated 84% of the local population.

=== Religion ===
Census 2021 (1+ %)
Religion	Number	Fraction
None	171	67.32%
Roman Catholic Church	45	17.72%
Calvinist Church	20	7.87%
Jehovah's Witnesses	10	3.94%
Evangelical Church	4	1.57%
Not found out	3	1.18%
Total	254	

In year 2021 was 254 people by religion 171 from None, 45 from Roman Catholic Church, 20 from Calvinist Church, 10 from Jehovah's Witnesses, 4 from Evangelical Church, 3 from Not found out and 1 from Christian Congregations in Slovakia.

== Genealogical resources ==
The records for genealogical research are available at the state archive "Statny Archiv in Banska Bystrica, Slovakia"

- Roman Catholic church records (births/marriages/deaths): 1789-1896 (parish B)
- Lutheran church records (births/marriages/deaths): 1685-1897 (parish B)
- Reformated church records (births/marriages/deaths): 1786-1895 (parish B)

== See also ==
- List of municipalities and towns in Slovakia
