= Bátka =

Village and municipality in Slovakia

Bátka Bátka
- Municipality
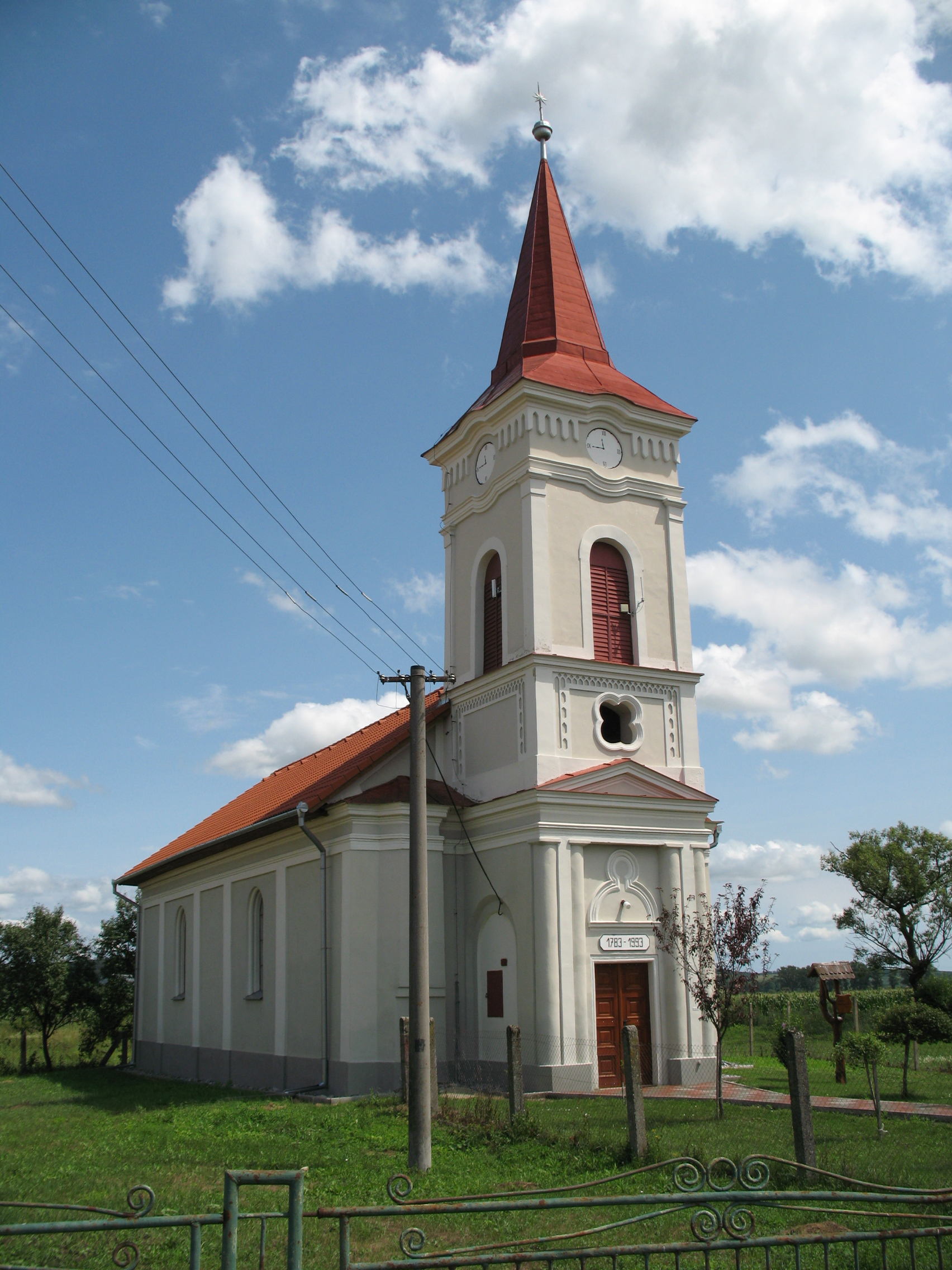

- Flag

- Location of Bátka in the Banská Bystrica Region Location of Bátka in Slovakia
- Coordinates: 48.38°N 20.18°E
- Country: Slovakia
- Region: Banská Bystrica Region
- District: Rimavská Sobota District
- First mentioned: 1294

Area
  - Total: 11.80 km^{2} (4.56 sq mi)
- Elevation: 182 m (597 ft)

Population (2025)
  - Total: 809
- Time zone: UTC+1 (CET)
  - Summer (DST): UTC+2 (CEST)
- Postal code: 980 21
- Area code: +421 47
- Vehicle registration plate (until 2022): RS
- Website: obecbatka.sk

Bátka (earlier: Batka; Hungarian: Bátka, c. 1895–1906: Alsóbátka and Felsőbátka) is a village and municipality in the Rimavská Sobota District of the Banská Bystrica Region of southern Slovakia.

== Geography ==
The municipality lies at an altitude of 182 metres (597 ft) and covers an area of 11.80 km^{2} (4.56 sq mi) (2025).

== History ==
The municipality arose in the late 19th century by a merge of Dolná Bátka (Alsóbátka) and Horná Bátka (Felsöbátka). The two villages formed one common village (Batka) before the mid-14th century, as well.

In historical records, Dolná Bátka was first mentioned in 1294 (Bathka). It belonged to the Kállay noble family in the 15th and 16th century. Horná Bátka arose in 1294 (as a part of Dolná Batka) as a royal donation to the knight Tumpold Krispin. In 1411 it passed to local landowners Bátky.From 1938 to 1944 it belonged to Hungary.

== Genealogical resources ==
The records for genealogical research are available at the state archive "Statny Archiv in Banska Bystrica, Slovakia"

- Roman Catholic church records (births/marriages/deaths): 1789-1896 (parish B)
- Lutheran church records (births/marriages/deaths):1685-1897 (parish B)
- Reformated church records (births/marriages/deaths): 1786-1895 (parish A)

== Population ==
Population statistic (10 years)
Year	1995	2005	2015	2025
Count	860	952	900	809
Difference		+10.69%	−5.46%	−10.11%

Population statistic
Year	2024	2025
Count	822	809
Difference		−1.58%

It has a population of 809 people (31 December 2025).

=== Ethnicity ===
Census 2021 (1+ %)
Ethnicity	Number	Fraction
Hungarian	683	80.44%
Slovak	155	18.25%
Romani	99	11.66%
Not found out	36	4.24%
Total	849	

In year 2021 was 849 people by ethnicity 683 as Hungarian, 155 as Slovak, 99 as Romani, 36 as Not found out, 4 as Czech, 1 as Ukrainian and 1 as Other.

Note on population: The difference values of population numbers in the table "Population statistic" and in the sections "Ethnicity" & "Religion" is caused by the use of various statistical methods.

=== Religion ===
Census 2021 (1+ %)
Religion	Number	Fraction
Calvinist Church	347	40.87%
None	219	25.8%
Roman Catholic Church	200	23.56%
Not found out	24	2.83%
Jehovah's Witnesses	20	2.36%
Evangelical Church	20	2.36%
Greek Catholic Church	10	1.18%
Total	849	

In year 2021 was 849 people by religion 347 from Calvinist Church, 219 from None, 200 from Roman Catholic Church, 24 from Not found out, 20 from Jehovah's Witnesses, 20 from Evangelical Church, 10 from Greek Catholic Church, 6 from Christian Congregations in Slovakia, 2 from United Methodist Church and 1 from Buddhism.

== See also ==
- List of municipalities and towns in Slovakia
