= Podhorany, Kežmarok District =

Podhorany
- Municipality
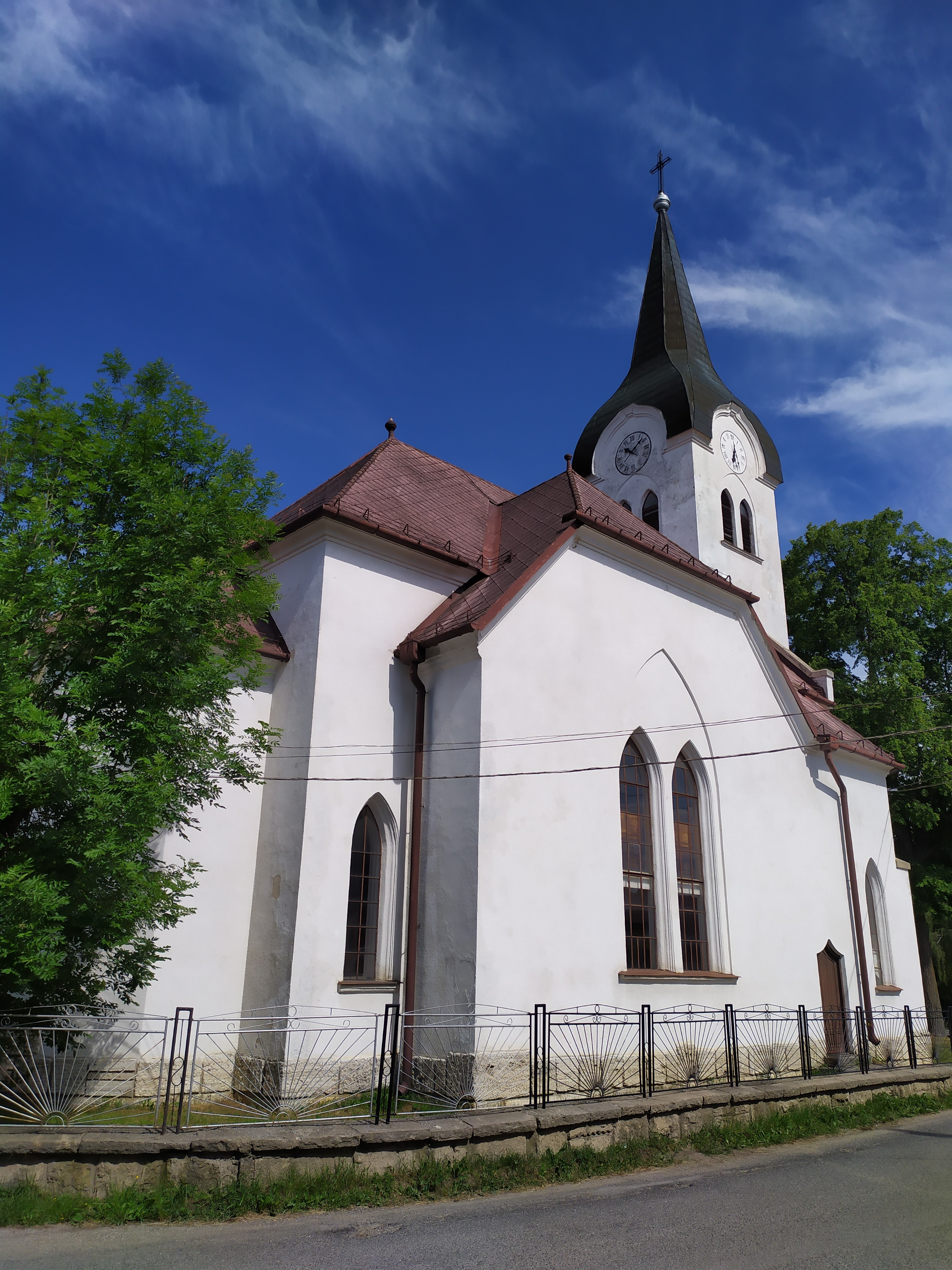

- Flag

- Location of Podhorany in the Prešov Region Location of Podhorany in Slovakia
- Coordinates: 49.24°N 20.48°E
- Country: Slovakia
- Region: Prešov Region
- District: Kežmarok District
- First mentioned: 1235

Area
  - Total: 11.02 km^{2} (4.25 sq mi)
- Elevation: 596 m (1,955 ft)

Population (2025)
  - Total: 3,095
- Time zone: UTC+1 (CET)
  - Summer (DST): UTC+2 (CEST)
- Postal code: 599 3
- Area code: +421 52
- Vehicle registration plate (until 2022): KK
- Website: www.maldur.sk

Podhorany (German: Maltern, Hungarian: Maldur, Rusyn: Подгорані) is a village and municipality in Kežmarok District in the Prešov Region of north Slovakia.

== History ==
In historical records the village was first mentioned in 1235.

In 1910 the village had 598 mainly German inhabitants of Lutheran confession. It was part of the German language island of the Oberzips. Before the establishment of independent Czechoslovakia in 1918, Podhorany was part of Szepes County within the Kingdom of Hungary. From 1939 to 1945, it was part of the Slovak Republic. On 26 January 1945, the Red Army dislodged the Wehrmacht from Podhorany and it was once again part of Czechoslovakia. After the end of World War II the German population was expelled, according to the Beneš decrees.

== Geography ==
The municipality lies at an altitude of 596 metres (1,955 ft) and covers an area of 11.02 km^{2} (4.25 sq mi) (2025).

== Population ==
Population statistic (10 years)
Year	1995	2005	2015	2025
Count	1037	1620	2693	3095
Difference		+56.21%	+66.23%	+14.92%

Population statistic
Year	2024	2025
Count	3029	3095
Difference		+2.17%

It has a population of 3095 people (31 December 2025).

=== Ethnicity ===
Census 2021 (1+ %)
Ethnicity	Number	Fraction
Romani	2085	77.07%
Slovak	1538	56.85%
Not found out	123	4.54%
Total	2705	

In year 2021 was 2705 people by ethnicity 2085 as Romani, 1538 as Slovak, 123 as Not found out, 17 as Ukrainian, 6 as Polish, 4 as Rusyn, 3 as Czech, 1 as German and 1 as Hungarian.

Note on population: The difference values of population numbers in the table "Population statistic" and in the sections "Ethnicity" & "Religion" is caused by the use of various statistical methods.

The vast majority of the municipality's population consists of the local Roma community. In 2019, they constituted an estimated 78% of the local population.

=== Religion ===
Census 2021 (1+ %)
Religion	Number	Fraction
Roman Catholic Church	2470	91.31%
Christian Congregations in Slovakia	71	2.62%
Not found out	65	2.4%
Eastern Orthodox Church	35	1.29%
None	32	1.18%
Total	2705	

In year 2021 was 2705 people by religion 2470 from Roman Catholic Church, 71 from Christian Congregations in Slovakia, 65 from Not found out, 35 from Eastern Orthodox Church, 32 from None, 14 from Evangelical Church, 8 from Greek Catholic Church, 6 from Calvinist Church, 2 from Ad hoc movements, 1 from Other and not ascertained christian church and 1 from Jehovah's Witnesses.

According to 2010 census total population had been 2333. In the village is sizeable Roma nationality, which had been claimed by 949 inhabitants, which is ca. 41% of the total population. In 2010 there had been 1165 males and 1166 females, what is ca. 50% for both.

In 2019, they constituted an estimated 78% of the municipality's population.

== Economy and infrastructure ==
In the village is foodstuff store, train stop, elementary school and a pub. Cultural sightseeings are gothic Roman Catholic and classical evangelical churches.
