= Vladimir Logothetti =

Vladimir Emanuel Alexander Count Logothetti
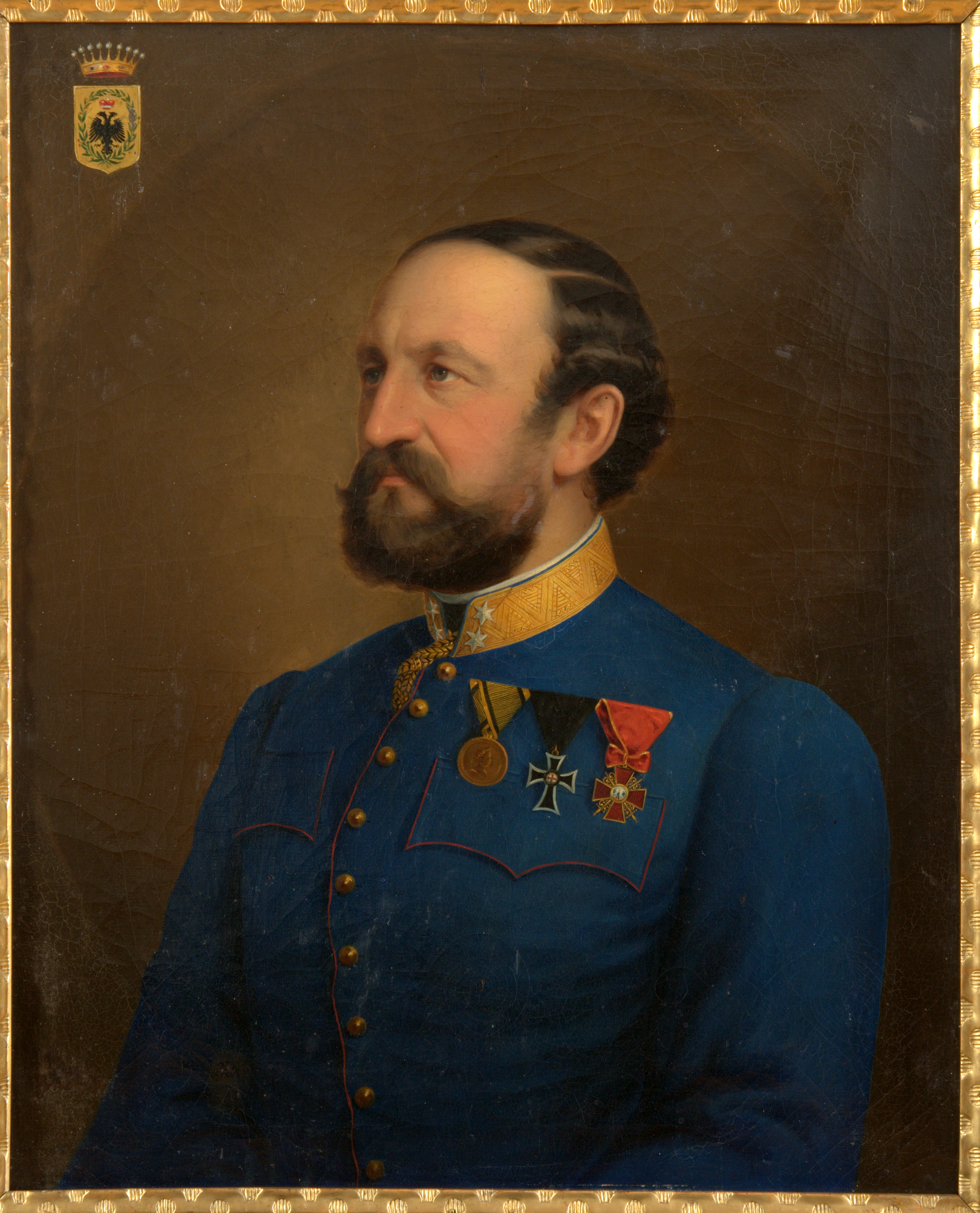
- Born: 4 August 1822; Filiale Tamassy
- Died: 7 December 1892 (aged 70)

Vladimir Emanuel Alexander Count Logothetti (4 August 1822 in Filiale Tamassy (now Tomášovce, Slovakia) – 7 December 1892 in Radautz, Bukovina (now Rădăuți, Romania)) was an Austrian-Hungarian nobleman, officer, politician and founder of the first voluntary fire brigade in Moravia.

== Descent ==
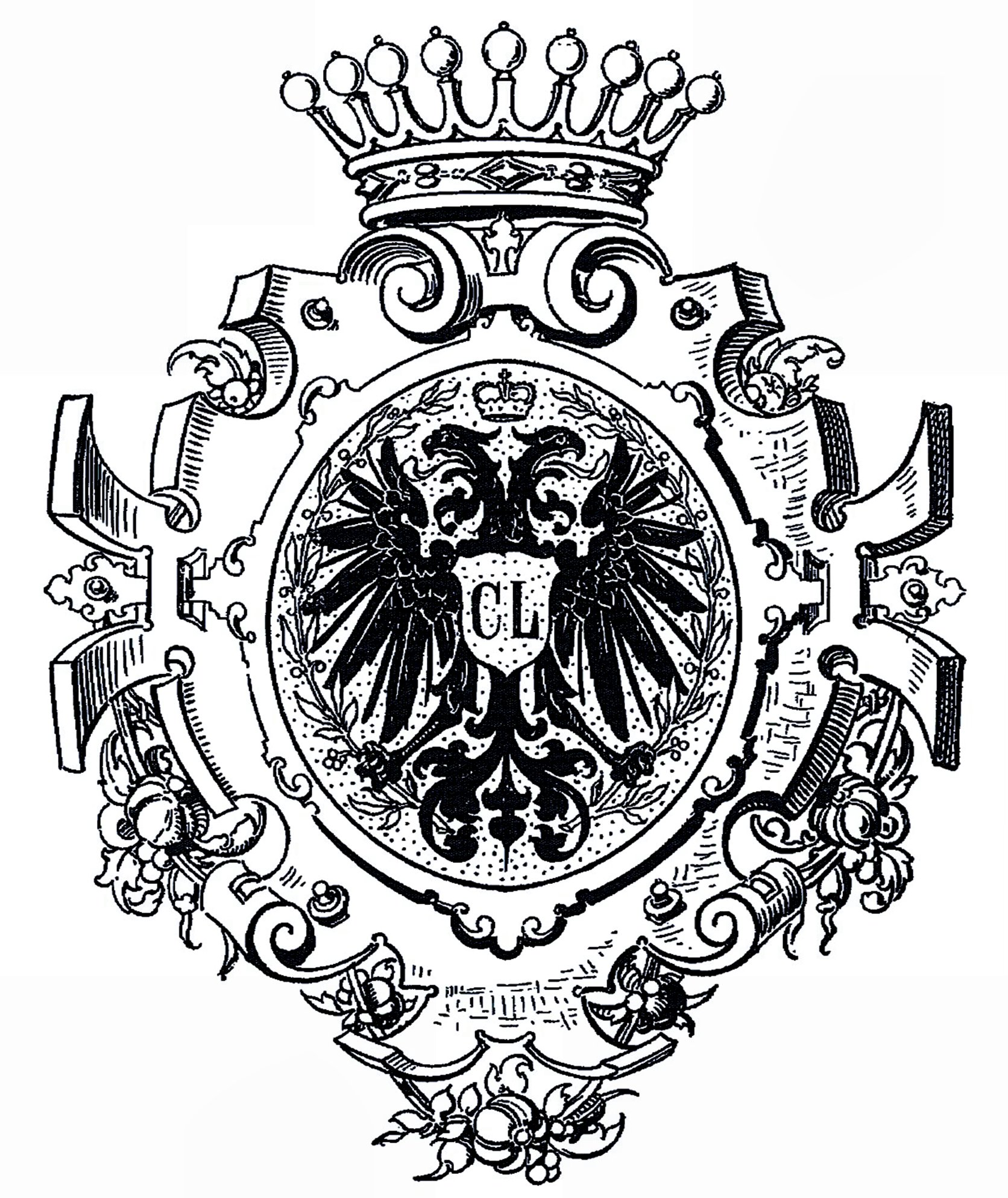
Coat of arms of the Logothetti family as used by Vladimir

Logothetti originated from an old Byzantine lineage claiming an origin dating back to the Byzantine Emperor Nikephoros I Logothetes (reigned 802-811) that settled after the fall of Constantinople (1453) on the Ionian island of Zante (Zakynthos). In the 18th century a descendant, the officer of the Venetian Republic Giacomo (James) Conte Logothetti (1741–1802) went to the principality of Moldavia. After the annexation of the Bukovina he became an Austrian citizen. His issue played an important role in the defence of this most eastern Austrian province and were counted among the honourables of its capital Czernowitz (nowadays: Chernivtsi, Чернівці, Ukraine).

Vladimir's father, Hugo I Logothetti (1801–1861) bought after his marriage with Pauline Baroness von Bartenstein, a direct offspring of the chancellor of the Empress Maria Theresa Johann Christoph von Bartenstein, in 1830 the manors Bilovice and Březolupy near the South Moravian town of Uherské Hradiště. He was known as Maecenas of the Czech painter Josef Mánes(1820–1871) to whom he commissioned a portrait of Veruna Čudová. This painting is nowadays the most known genre piece of Mánes.

Vladimir has been born 4 August 1822 in Filiale Tamassy (now Tomášovce, Lučenec District/Slovakia) where his father Hugo I Logothetti (1822–1892) served as Austrian army officer. He was the eldest of seven children. After one year his sister Hedwig (1823–1899) was born in Filiale Tamassy. As was usual in that period three other children died in infant age – Bertha (*,†1825), Lodoiska (1826–1829) and Alfred (1830–1833). The uncertain military life with ever changing posts in then poorest part of the Austrian Empire, the so-called "Kingdom of Galicia and Lodomeria" will have been one of the reasons of this high loss of children.

In 1830 Hugo I Logothetti bought after selling his hereditary properties in the Bukovina the manors Bilovice and Březolupy near the South Moravian town of Uherské Hradiště. His youngest children Julia (1833–1854) and Zdenko (1835–1881) were born in Moravia. Hugo I was known as Maecenas of the Czech painter Josef Mánes(1820–1871) to whom he commissioned a portrait of Veruna Čudová. This painting is nowadays the most known genre piece of Mánes. Thanks to the Bucovinian money and the heritage of his wife the family was able to live the quiet life of country gentry.

== Career ==
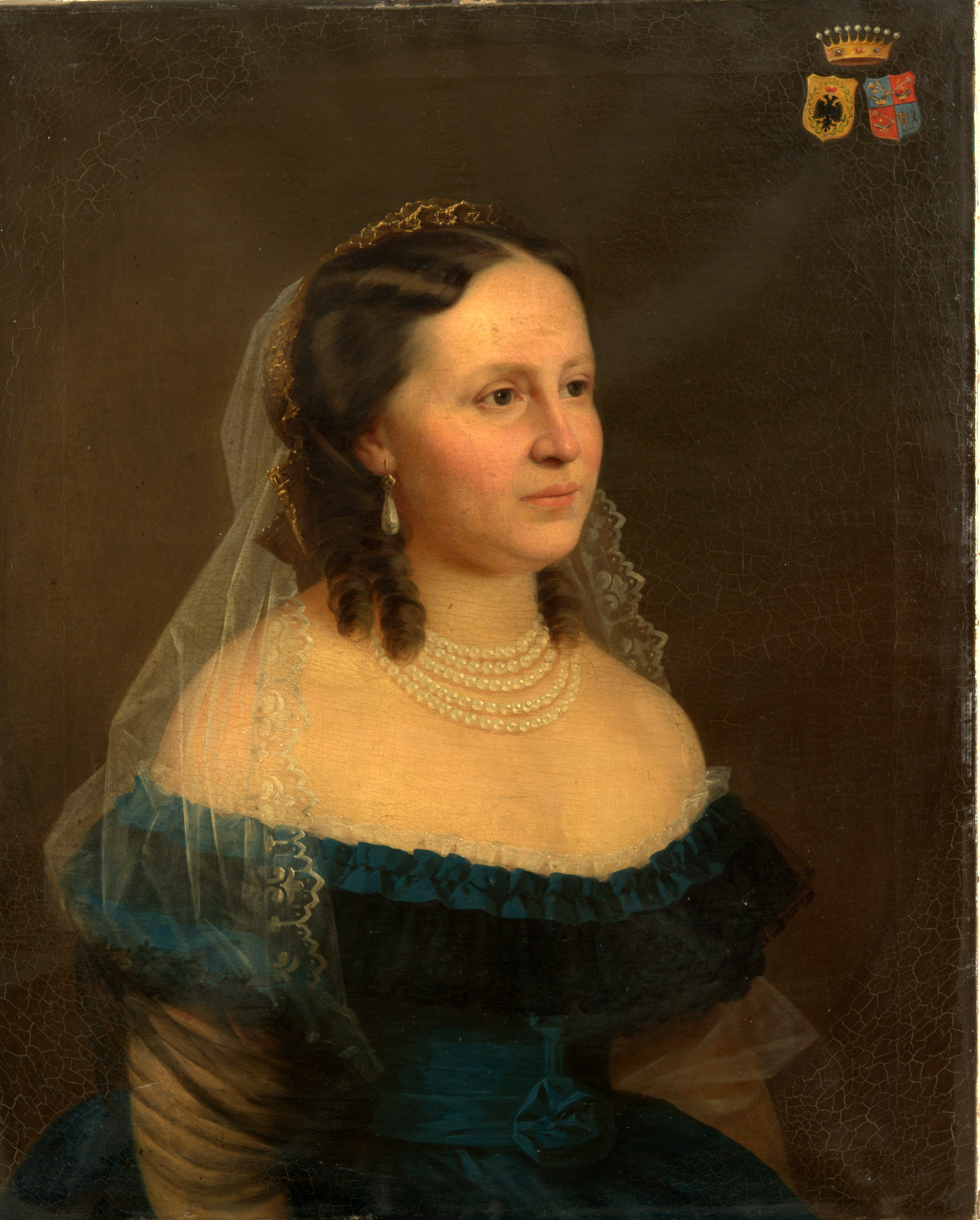
Portrait of Karolina Countess Logothetti née Countess Nemes de Hidvég c1870

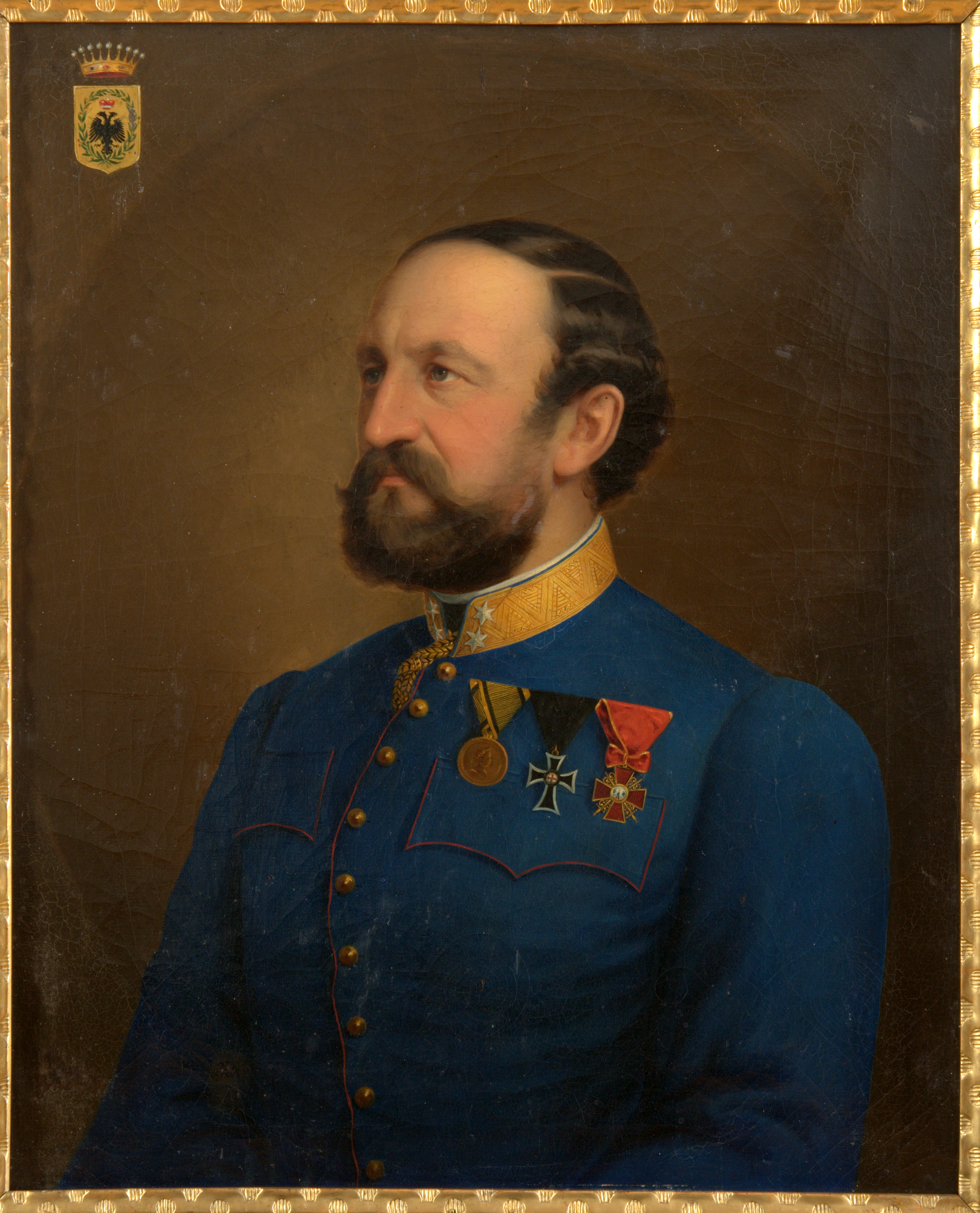
Portrait of Vladimir Count Logothetti c1870

Following his studies at a high school in Brünn (now: Brno) Vladimir entered as voluntary cadet the 5th Cuirassier Regiment Graf Auersperg in Brünn. Soon afterwards he was sent into combat during the Hungarian Revolution of 1848 and fought as officer of the 4th Uhlan Regiment in Upper Hungary, Transylvania and Italy. He was wounded several times and received a big number of Austrian and Russian decorations for personal courage.

During the war he made acquaintance in the Transylvanian Komitat Kronstadt (now Brașov/Romania) with his later spouse, female descendant from the catholic branch of important Transylvanian Hungarian, mostly Calvinist lineage. They married in 1851 (see below). Vladimir's father requested in 1831, 1832 and 1834 recognition of the traditional noble title of his lineage by the Austrian Court. Because of the bad situation of the Bucovinian records he was not able to deliver all necessary documents and thus far didn't acquire recognition of the title of Count the Logothettis used since 1703. The active participation of the Logothettis in the struggle for survival of the Empire against Hungarian, German and Italian revolts in 1848/9 was rewarded with an imperial decree of 8 July 1848 allowing Hugo I and his sons to "use the foreign title of Count".

Till 1860 Vladimir was in active service as army officer, mainly in Galicia and Transylvania, where the first three children were born. When his father's health grew worse Vladimir returned to Moravia to take over the administration of the family properties. He left active service in the rank of Commander of the 1st Division of the Voluntary Uhlan Regiment, than fighting in Northern Italy.

Vladimir settled in Bílovice, his younger brother Zdenko lived with theirin 1861 widowed mother Pauline Countess Logothetti née Baroness Bartenstein (1800–1872) in Březolupy. Thanks to the big dowry of his wife Vladimir was able to modernise the Bílovice manor thoroughly and to build a new wing. On the c1860 photograph the new eastern wing is clearly recognisable.

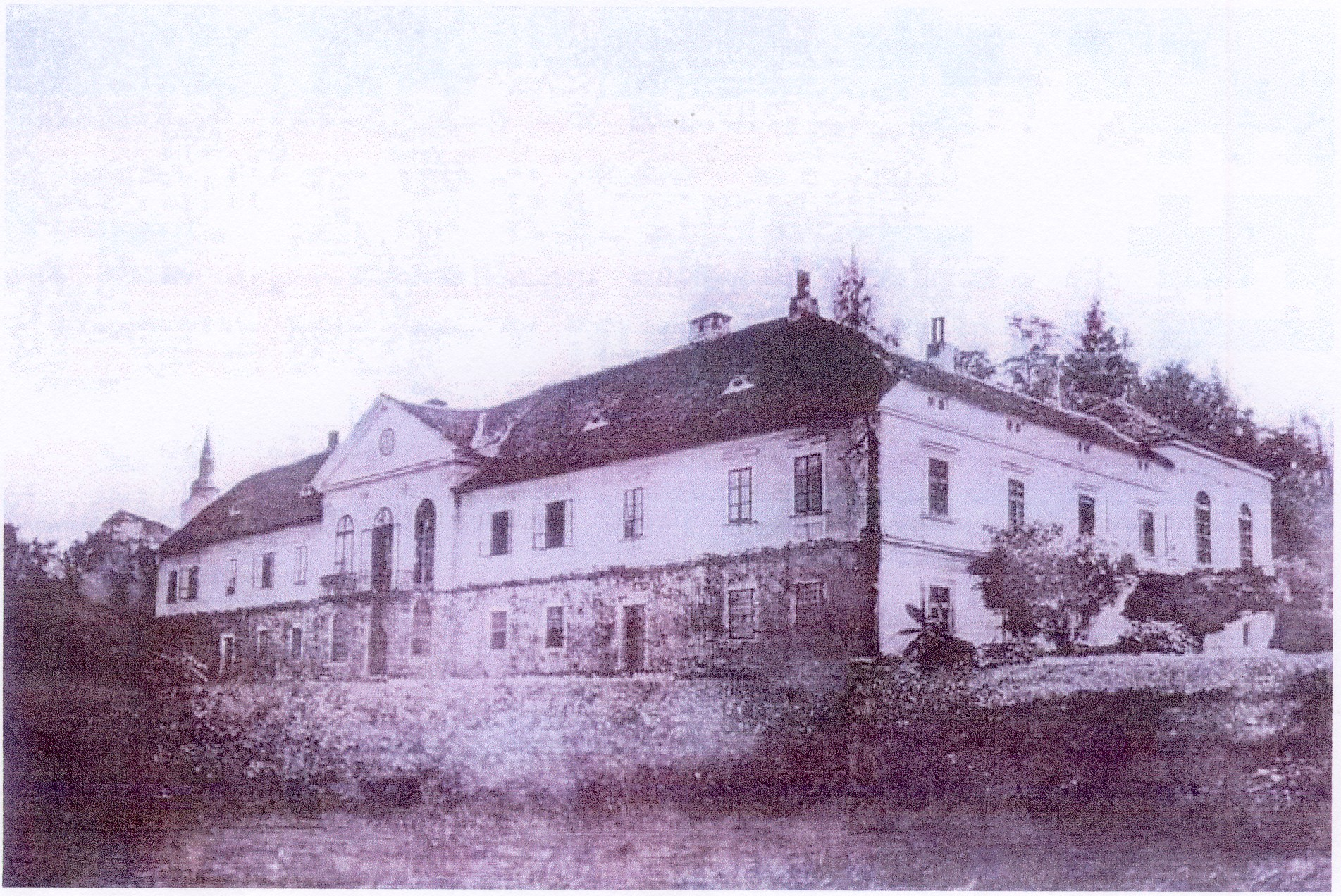
Bílovice Manor, photograph c1860

After his father's dead in 1861 Vladimir was officially declared disabled for active military service. He then took over the social role of his father. In 1864-1865 he was mayor of Bílovice, in the fourth and fifth term of the Moravian Diet (1871–1877) he was member of parliament in Brünn (Brno) for the party of lower nobility and took a strictly Moravian position.

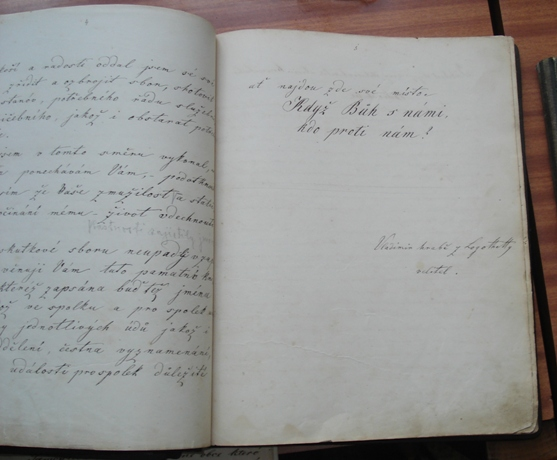
Registration of Vladimir Logothetti in Czech on the first sides of the journal of the Voluntary Fire Brigade of Bílovice

For the development of the village of Bílovice in particular and that of Southern Moravia in general the most important deed of Vladimir was the creation in 1869 of the first Moravian Voluntary Fire Brigade. Blazes were an often returning catastrophe in that time and as an experienced military Vladimir knew how to handle with it. In 1861 and 1865 Vladimir and his brother Zdenko effectively helped to master blazes in the near village of Kněžpole that offered them then the honorary citizenship. In 1869 Vladimir became also honorary citizen of Bílovice, being the first commander of the newly erected Fire Brigade. In 1873 Logothetti was one of the initiators of a new Law on Voluntary Fire Brigades in all villages counting more than 100 houses in the Moravian Diet.

Vladimir spoke fluently Czech, German, Romanian, Hungarian and Polish. He organised competitions between Czech and German speaking schoolboys and was active in the Uherské Hradiště Men's Chorus that he founded with his father. In 1863 he founded together with his brother Zdenko the first Moravian rowing club Rudenverein Moravia in Uherské Hradiště.

Three false tries to come to a Moravian Compromise regulating the cohabitation of Czech and German speaking Moravians (in 1848, 1868 and 1871) got nowhere (the Moravian Compromise was finally made as late as in 1905) and Vladimir decided disappointed to leave active politics to return to the accustomed life of an active military. In 1877 he refused to candidate for the sixth term of the Diet and entered instead of that the Uhlan Squadron of the Royal Galician Home Guard.

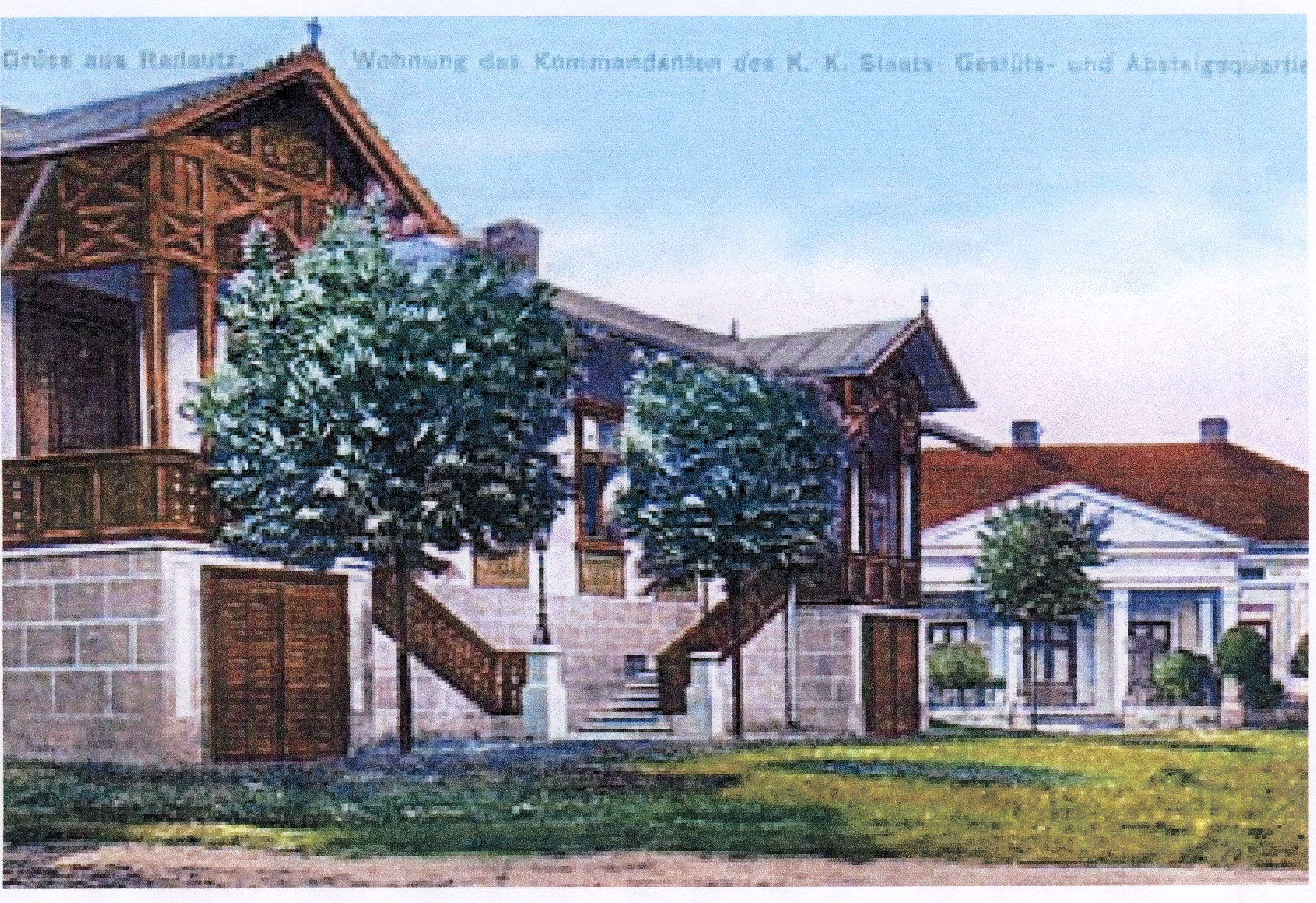
House of the Commander of the State Military Horse Breeding in Radautz (Bucovina) c1885

In 1882 Vladimir accepted the available function of Commander of the State Horse Breeding in Drogowitz (Drohobych in Ukraine). In 1883 he changed this position for the more important one of Commander of the State Military Stud Farm in Radautz in the Bucovina. The postcard shows his official dwelling. Logothetti developed further the breeding of Carpathian Hucul ponies that were much used by the Austro-Hungarian Army for their endurance.

On 7 December 1892 the 70 years old officer died due to adverse effects after a bad spill from his horse. His corpse was transferred to Bílovice and buried with military honour at the family cemetery. The Bílovice Voluntary Frire Brigade is memorating every fifth year their founder.

== Family ==
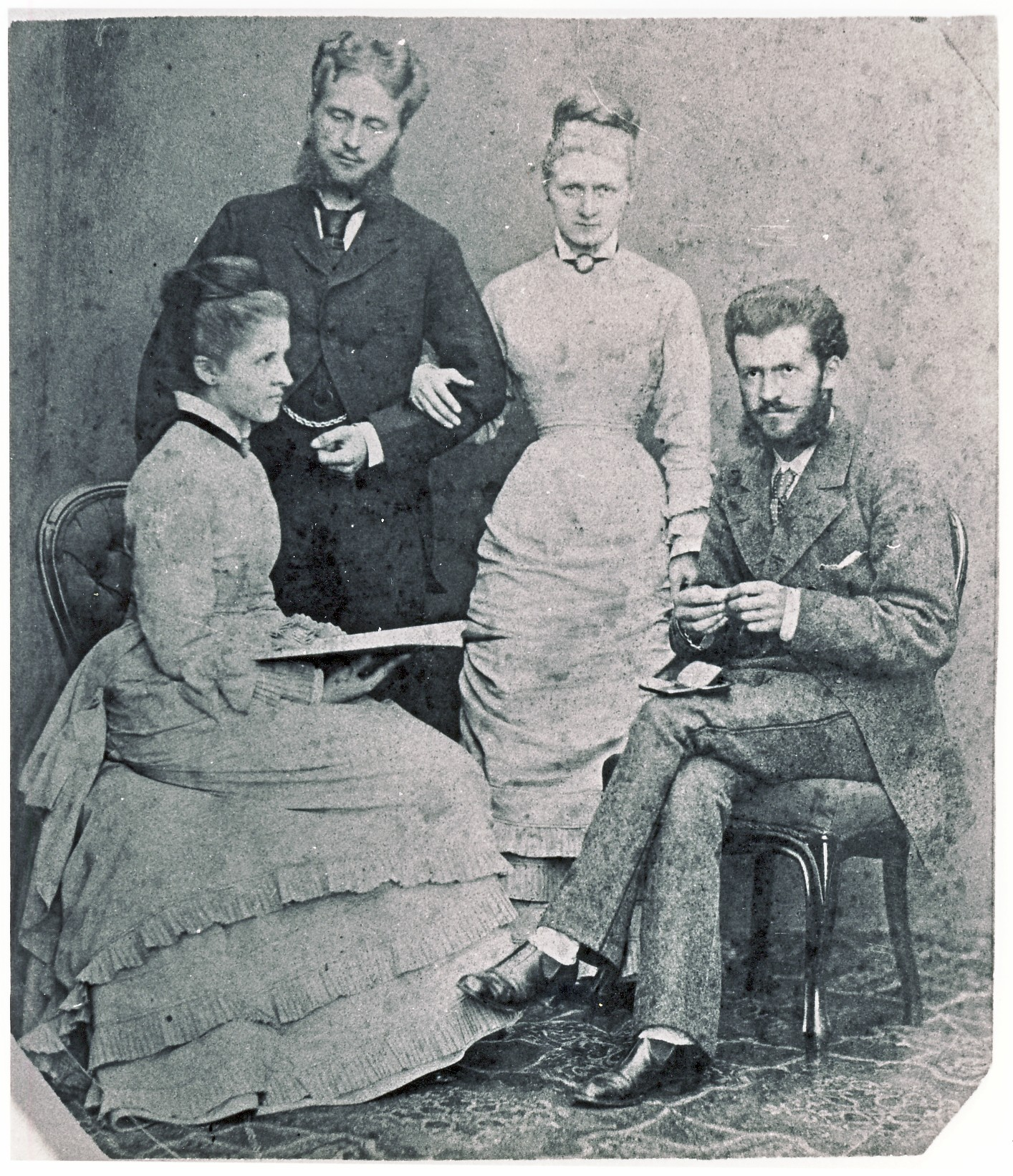
The Logothetti children. From left to right: Rosa Countess Logothetti (1856-1941), Hugo II Count Logothetti (1852-1918), Maria Baroness Taxis née Countess Logothetti (1859-1929), Alfred Count Logothetti (1853-1923). Bilovice, c1880

Vladimir Logothetti married 25 October 1851 in the Catholic Cathedral of the Transylvanian capital Klausenburg (now Cluj-Napoca/Romania) with Maria Karolina Rosalia Johanna Countess Nemes de Hidvég et Oltszem (1826–1906). She was an offspring from the Catholic branch of an old Transylvanian noble lineage. The family was mostly Calvinist and acquired its title from the legendary Transylvanian Prince Gabriel Bethlen. The Calvinist branch had their own pews in the still-existing Hungarian Calvinist church in Fárkas útca (Wolfstrasse, now Strada Mihail Kogălniceanu) in Kolozsvár (Cluj). The Catholic branch reconverted in 1755 with Karolina's grandfather Ádam grof Nemes de Hídvégi (†1766). They acquired then the title of Count (gróf) and had in Klausenburg their own crypta in the Catholic University Church, the Piarist's or Academic Church.

The married couple had four children: Hugo II (1852–1918), later a high Austro-Hungarian diplomat; Alfred (1853–1923), Austro-Hungarian army officer and after 1918 Romanian landowner; Rosalia (1856–1942), honorary lady of the Noble Ladies' Convent Maria Schul in Brünn (Brno); and Maria (1859–1929), married Paul Lamoral Baron Taxis von Bordogna und Valnigra (1852–1901).

== Orders and honours ==
Logothetti obtained during his active military service several decorations for personal courage:

- Imperial and Royal War Medal, Austrian Empire – 1848
- Military Merit Cross, Austrian Empire - 1849
- Knight's Cross 3rd Class with Swords of the Order of Saint Anne, Russian Empire – 1849
- Knight of the Order of the Iron Crown, Austrian Empire – 1861
- The St. Mary's Cross, German Knights (Austrian Branch) – 1882

== Literature ==
- Family records Logothetti 1734-1945, now Moravský zemský archiv, Brno (Czech Republic), fond G 195
- Ernst Brückmüller, Hannes Stekl, Péter Hanák, Ilona Sármány-Parsons, Bürgertum in der Habsburgermonarchie: Kleinstadtbürgertum in der Habsburgermonarchie 1862-1914. Wien, Böhlau 2002, ISBN 3-205-98939-2 (Ungarisch-Hradisch).
- Wilken Engelbrecht, Rod Logothettiů, in: Genealogické a heraldické informace III (1998), p. 17-27. ISSN 0862-8963.
- (red.) Alois Koch, Encyklopädie der gesammten Thierheilkunde und Thierzucht VIII, Perles 1891, p. 262.
- Pavel Krystýn. Bílovičtí páni. Logothettiové. In. Ibid., Bílovice 1256-2006. Obecní úřad Bílovice / Vydavatelství Petr Brázda, Bílovice/Břeclav 2006, p. 27-34. ISBN 80-903762-7-4.
- Vladimír Krystýn, Logothettiové z Bílovic. In: Slovácko XL (1998), p. 221-234. ISBN 80-86185-04-4.
- Gustav Amon von Treuenfest, Geschichte des k. und k. Uhlanen-Regiments Kaiser. Verlag des Regiments 1901.
