= Tomášovce =

Tomášovce may refer to:

- Tomášovce, Lučenec District, Slovakia
- Tomášovce, Rimavská Sobota District, Rimavská Sobota District, Slovakia
- Spišské Tomášovce, a village and municipality in the Spišská Nová Ves District, Košice Region, Slovakia
