= Hugo II Logothetti =

Austrian-Hungarian diplomat (1852–1918)

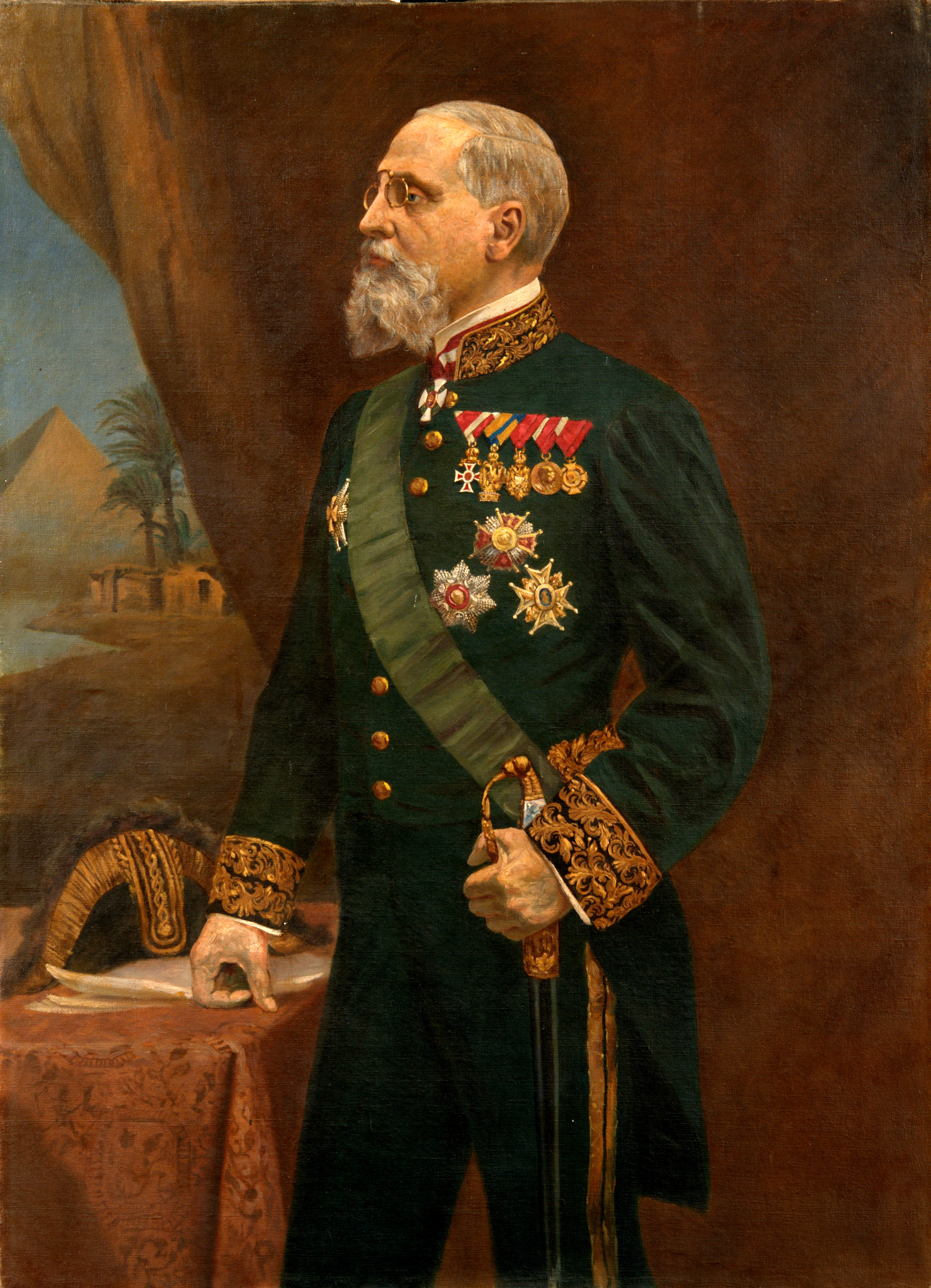
Hugo II Logothetti

Hugo Count Logothetti (2 October 1852 in Klausenburg – 3 Augustus 1918 in Teheran) was an Austrian-Hungarian diplomat of Greek ancestry and the last emissary of the Habsburg monarchy in Teheran.

== Descent ==
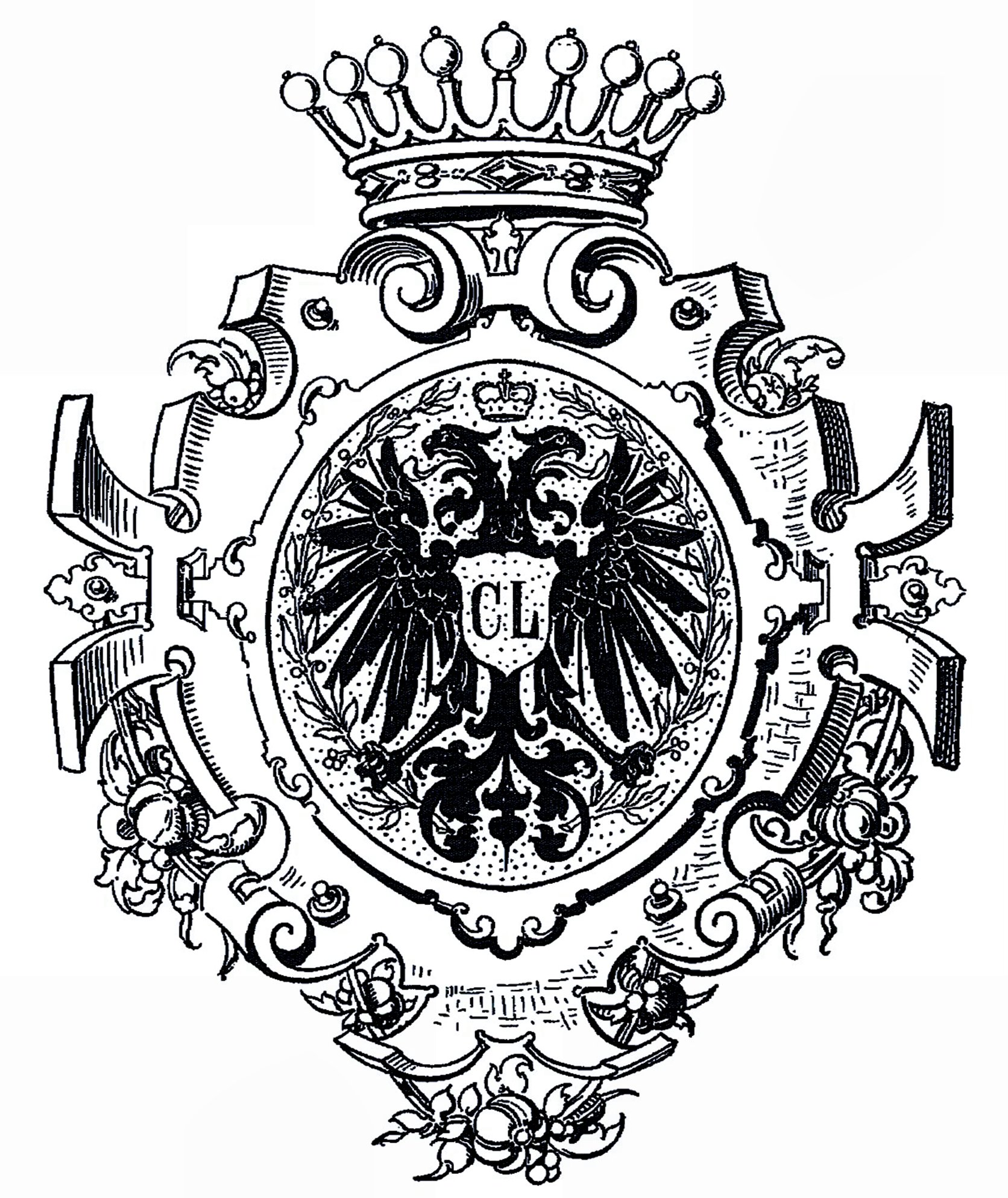
Arms of the Logothetti lineage

Hugo II Count Logothetti originated from an old Byzantine lineage which claimed its origin in the Byzantine Emperor Nikephoros I Logothetes (reigned 802–811) and settled on the Ionian island of Zante (Zakynthos) after the fall of Constantinople (1453). In the 18th century a descendant, an officer of the Venetian Republic, Giacomo (James) Conte Logothetti (1741–1802) went to the principality of Moldavia. After the annexation of the Bukovina he became an Austrian citizen. His descendants played an important role in the defence of this most eastern Austrian province and were counted among the honorables of its capital Czernowitz (nowadays: Chernivtsi, Чернівці, Ukraine). In 1830, after his marriage with Pauline Baroness Bartenstein, a direct offspring of the chancellor of the Empress Maria Theresa, Johann Christoph von Bartenstein, Hugo's grandfather Hugo I Logothetti (1801–1861) bought the manors Bilovice and Březolupy near the South Moravian town of Uherské Hradiště. He was known as Maecenas of the Czech painter Josef Mánes (1820–1871) from whom he commissioned a portrait of Veruna Čudová. This painting is nowadays the best known genre piece of Mánes. Hugo II was born 2 October 1852 in Klausenburg (the present Cluj-Napoca in Rumania) where his father Vladimir Count Logothetti (1822–1892) was serving as an officer in the army. Because his mother descended from high Transylvanian nobility (Nemes de Hidvég) with a palace and houses in Klausenburg, Hugo was baptized in the Roman Catholic cathedral of Klausenburg. In 1858 the family returned to Bilovice.

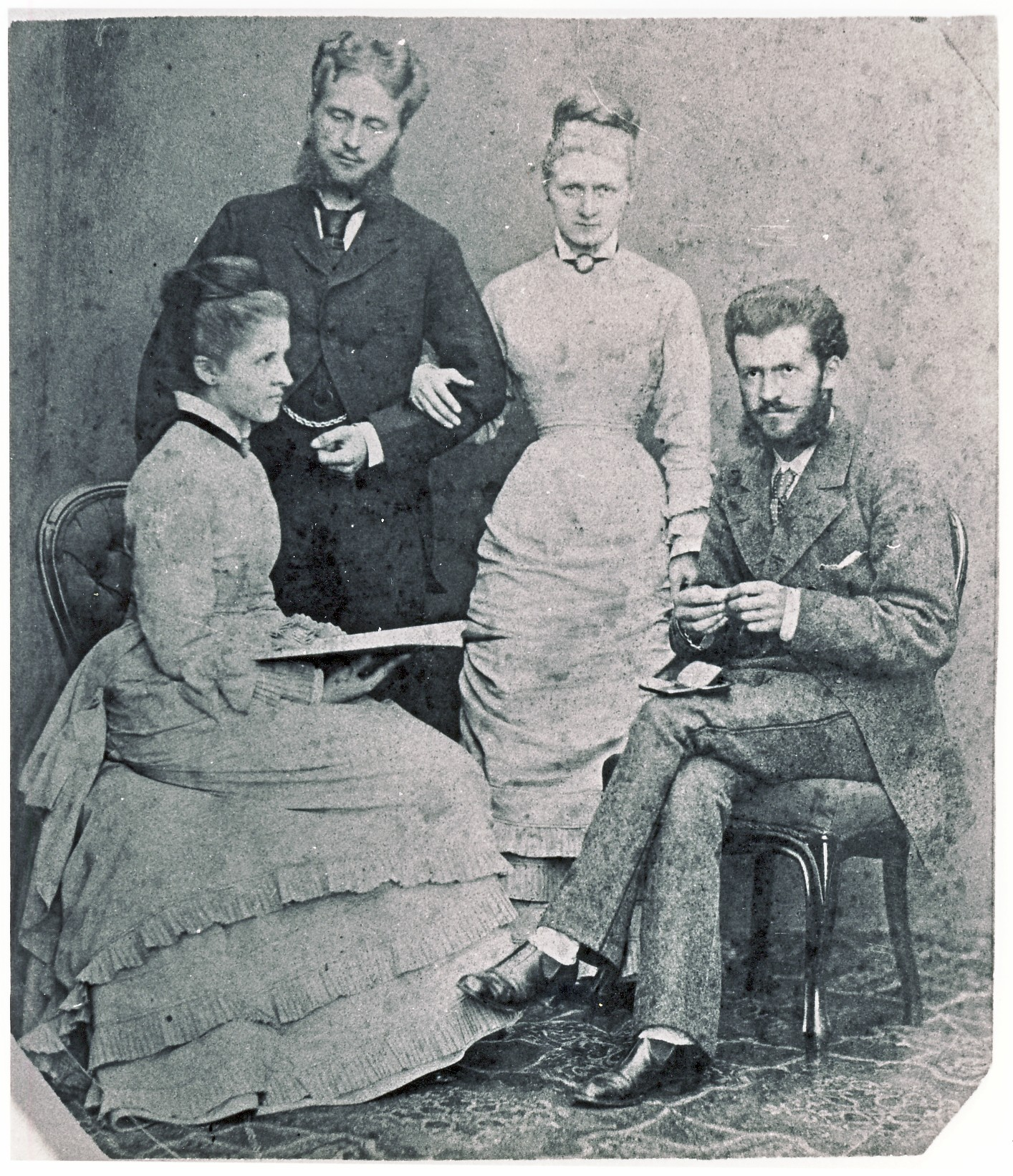
The Logothetti children. From left to right: Rosa Countess Logothetti (1856–1941), Hugo II Count Logothetti (1852–1918), Maria Baroness Taxis née Countess Logothetti (1859–1929), Alfred Count Logothetti (1853–1923). Bilovice, c1880

== Career ==
After secondary school in Uherské Hradiště, Hugo II entered the 54th Regiment of the Line in Olomouc as a volunteer, but had to quit service due to poor health in 1871. He then went to Vienna to study (1872–1877) at the Oriental Academy, the forerunner of the present Diplomatic Academy, founded by the Empress Maria Theresa. Logothetti had an aptitude for languages and learned Arabic, Persian and Turkish. His first foreign post after his study was in Constantinople, then one of the most important foreign missions of Austria-Hungary.

Logothetti's further career was typical for a gifted diplomat: consul-elève in Constantinople 1877–1880, consul-elève in Alexandria (Egypt) 1880–1882, deputy consul in Alexandria in 1882, in the same year consul in Port Said. In 1883 he became emissary of Austria-Hungary in the compensation commission in Alexandria. From September 1883 he was attaché in Constantinople, where in 1866 he became embassy secretary and became acquainted with the Austrian-Hungarian diplomat Julius baron Zwiedinek von Südenhorst (1833–1918), his later father-in-law.

On 17 July 1886 Logothetti married Frieda Barbara Baroness Zwiedinek von Südenhorst (1866–1945) in the church of St. Maria Draperis in the European quarter of Constantinople, Pera. In 1889 Logothetti was named judge of first instance in the International Tribunal in Alexandria. He held this function till 1897 when he became consul-general of Austria-Hungary in Rumania at Galati where he was at the same time Austrian-Hungarian emissary in the European Danube Commission. From 1899 till 1906 he was consul-general in Barcelona, 1906–1907 consul in Milan, 1907–1911 consul in Hamburg, 1911–1912 consul-general in Tunis.

Because of growing tension in the Balkans and the Near East it was necessary to provide the legation in Persia with an experienced diplomat with good knowledge of land and language. The new Austrian-Hungarian Minister of Foreign Affairs Leopold Berchtold (1863–1942) named Logothetti on 12 May 1912 as k. u. k. extraordinary plenipotentiary minister and envoy in Teheran. It was on this occasion that the official portrait was painted. Logothetti was a relative of the minister through his grandmother, Karolina Countess Berchtold.

Great-Britain and Russia divided Persia into spheres of influence in 1906 – the Russians were in northern Persia, the British in southeast Persia bounded by British India. In the west the Ottoman Empire tried to gain some influence in Persia. In a secret treaty (1907) Great-Britain and Russia tried to give an official status under international law to this situation. The Persians reacted, however, with a constitutional revolution (March/April 1912) that was crushed with Russian and British military aid. Nevertheless, the new Persian government tried to stay at least officially neutral in World War I.

On 4 November 1912 Logothetti presented his credentials to the Shah and began his service in Teheran. He had the task of defending Persian neutrality against all efforts of Russia and Great-Britain to get Persia on their side, as well to defend Austrian-Hungarian interests in the Near East.

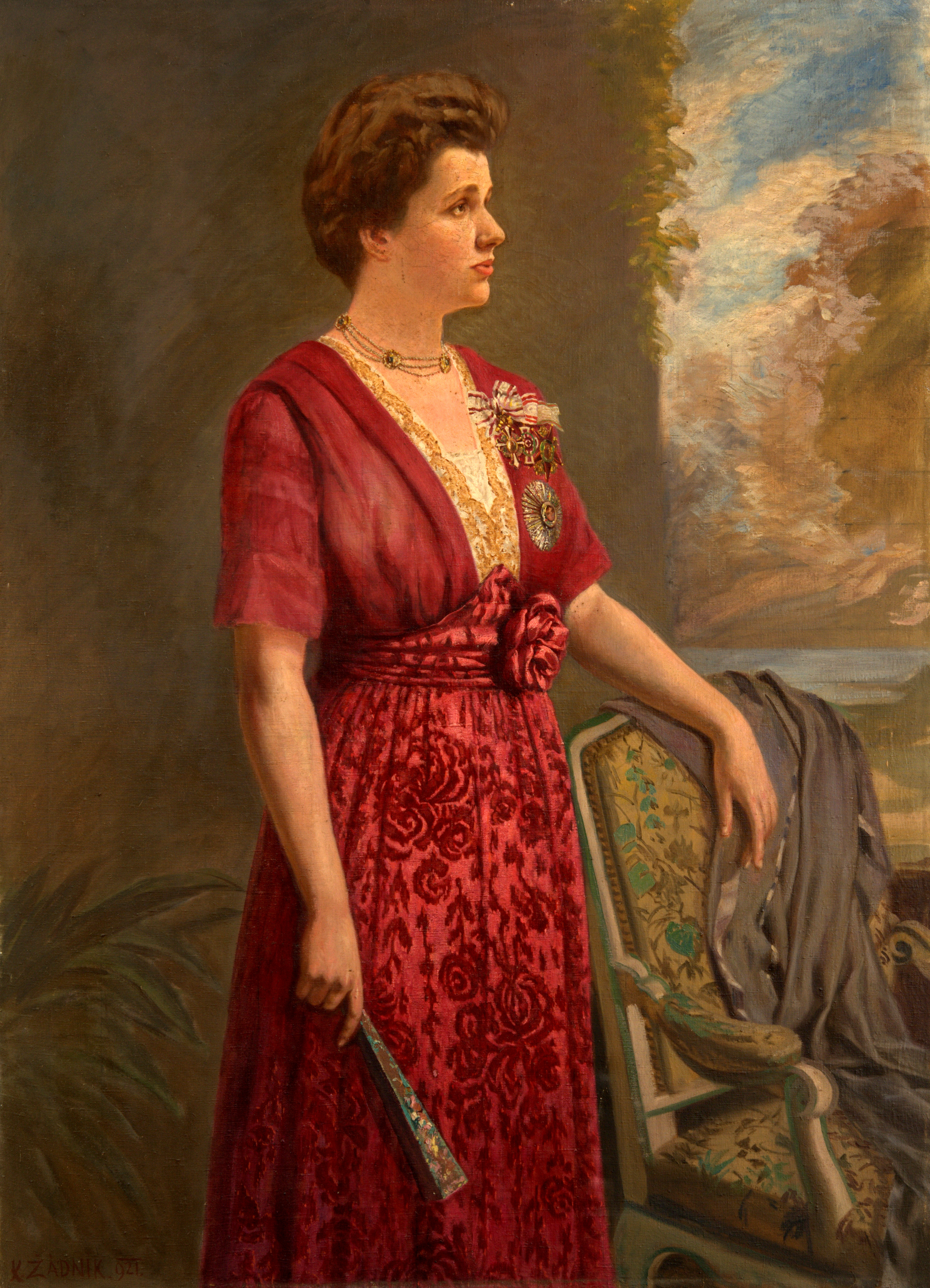
Frieda Countess Logothetti née Baroness Zwiedinek of Südenhorst

When the war broke out in 1914 Logothetti was on leave in Moravia. He left his family at home and returned alone to Teheran where he was arrested – against all diplomatic customs – by the Russians who deprived him of all money and sent him through Sweden back to Europe. On 27 April 1915 Logothetti returned to Teheran. After a failed putsch initiated by the German embassy (August 1915) and a German attempt to set up in Persia and Afghanistan a front against British India the situation in Persia became quite unsure for diplomats of the Central Powers. Most governments called their envoys back and thus after 1916 Logothetti was practically the only Central diplomat service in Persia. He survived several assaults on his person (1916, 1917) nearly unharmed.

In January 1918 the new Persian government tried to restore effective Persian neutrality. After the Russian Revolution of 1917 and the departure of Russian troops from northern Persia, Logothetti tried to free all prisoners of war of Austrian-Hungarian origin in Russian-Turkoman concentration camps in order to get them to Persia and through Constantinople back to Europe. These efforts had partly succeeded when Logothetti died suddenly and mysteriously on 3 August 1918 (presumably of arsenic poisoning). He was buried in the French mission church.

== Family ==
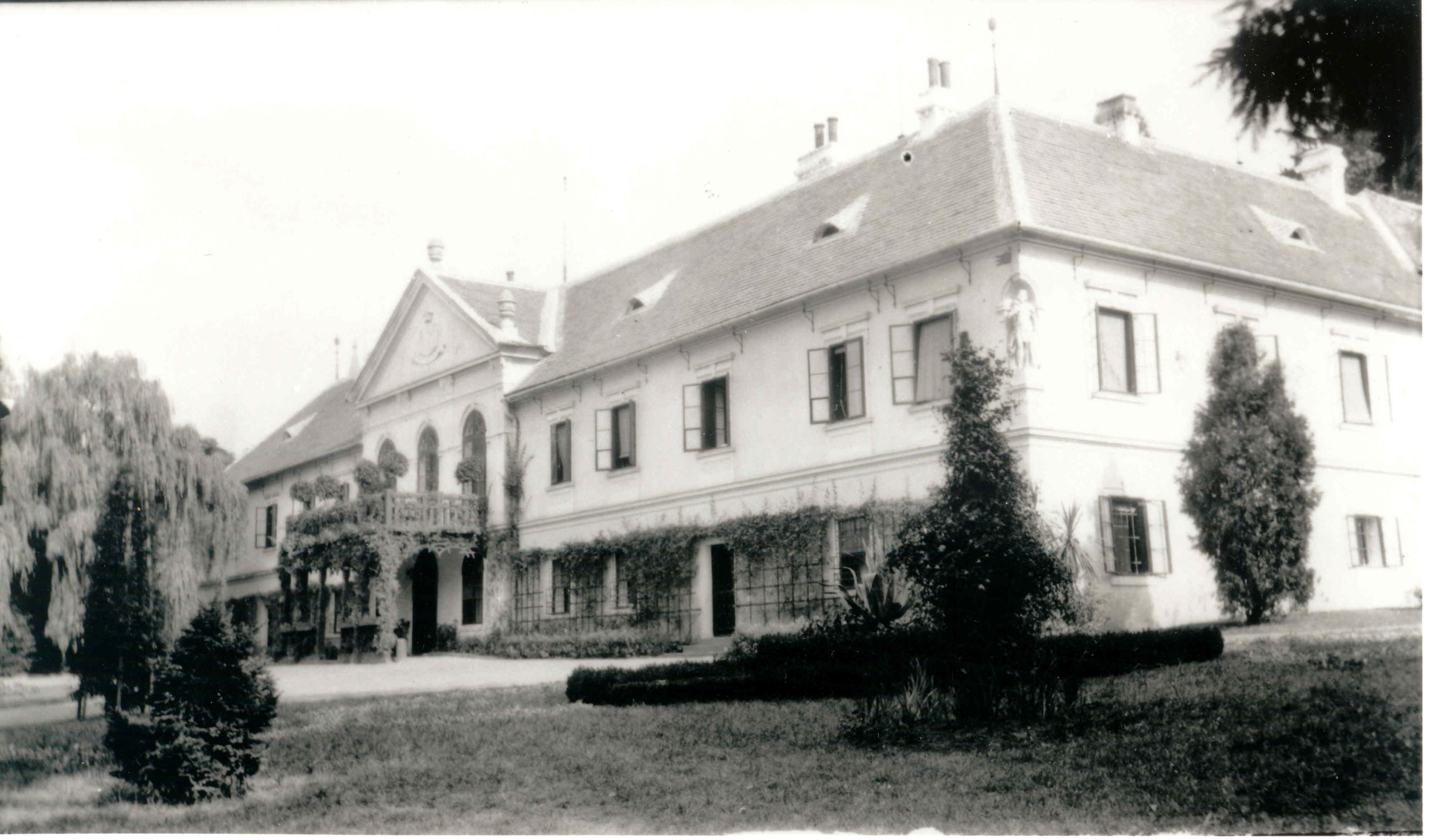
Bilovice Estate

Logothetti had with his spouse Frieda (died 1945) 10 children of whom three died young. The eldest daughters Marie-Rose Countess Logothetti (1888–1976) and Caroline (Lola) Countess Logothetti (1891–1978) married diplomats – Marie-Rose with the Italian envoy Giulio Cesare Cavagliere Montagna (1874–1954), Lola with the Dutch consul Willem-Bernard Engelbrecht (1881–1955). Hermine (Meta) married with the Hungarian judge Géza de Ertsey and the youngest daughter Carmen with the Moravian engineer Lothar Schmid. The eldest son Felix served as Austrian-Hungarian army officer (rittmaster) and married Countess Stella Barbo von Waxenstein, the daughter of Count Josef Anton Barbo von Waxenstein. In 1942 Felix, his wife and his son Deodat were murdered during a fight between Communist Jugoslavian partisans with Italian occupation troops on the hereditary castle of the family Barbo, Watzenberg Manor (Castello Dob) in present Slovenia. The second son Hugo III Count Logothetti (1901–1975) stayed till 1945 on the Moravian family estate Bilovice as did the youngest, Emanuel (1907–1990), who was up till 1938 a civil servant of the Czechoslovak Republic and after 1945 Secretary of State of Bavaria for refugee aid.

== Orders and honours ==
Logothetti obtained a large number of honours during his life. According to the documents in the family records, he received with the following:

- Knight's Cross of the Order of Franz Joseph, Austria-Hungary - 1882
- Osminieh Order, Ottoman Empire - 1883
- Kaiserlich und königlich Kämmerer (Imperial and Royal Chamberlain), Austria-Hungary - 1895
- Cavagliere dell' Ordine della Corona d'Italia, Italy - 1899
- Order of the Medjidie, Ottoman Empire - 1884
- Order of the Medjidie, 1st. Class with Star, Ottoman Empire - 1897
- Imperial Order of the Iron Crown, Austria-Hungary - 1902
- Commander with Star of the Royal Order of Elisabeth the Catholic, Spain - 1905
- Commander of the Royal and Distinguished Order of Charles III, Spain - 1906
- 1st Class of the Imperial Austrian Order of Leopold, Austria-Hungary - 1908
- Grand Cordon of the Order of Nichan-Istikhar, Tunisia - 1912/1330
- Military Cross for Civil Merit, 1st. Class, Austria-Hungary - 1918, post mortem

== Literature ==
- Family archive Logothetti 1734-1945, now in the Moravský zemský archiv, Brno, fund G 195
- Arthur Breycha-Vauthier, Logothetti Hugo Graf, in: Österreichisches Biographisches Lexikon 1815-1950 V (1972), p. 298. ISBN 978-3-7001-3213-4.
- Wilken Engelbrecht, Rod Logothettiů, in: Genealogické a heraldické informace III (1998), p. 17–27. ISSN 0862-8963.
- Peter Jung, Ein unbekannter Krieg 1914-1916. Das k. u. k. Gesandtschaftsdetachement Teheran. Verlagsbuchhandlung Stöhr, Wien 1997 (Österreichische Militärgeschichte, Folge 5).
- Pavel Krystýn. Bílovičtí páni. Logothettiové. In. Ibid., Bílovice 1256-2006. Obecní úřad Bílovice / Vydavatelství Petr Brázda, Bílovice/Břeclav 2006, p. 27–34. ISBN 80-903762-7-4.
- Vladimír Krystýn, Logothettiové z Bílovic. In: Slovácko XL (1998), p. 221–234. ISBN 80-86185-04-4.
- Constanze Gfn. Logothetti, Das neutrale Persien zwischen Entente und Mittelmächten. Geostrategische Lage damals und heute. Unpublished master thesis Ludwig-Maximilians-Universität München 2008.
