= Tomášovce, Rimavská Sobota District =

Tomášovce Balogtamási
- Municipality
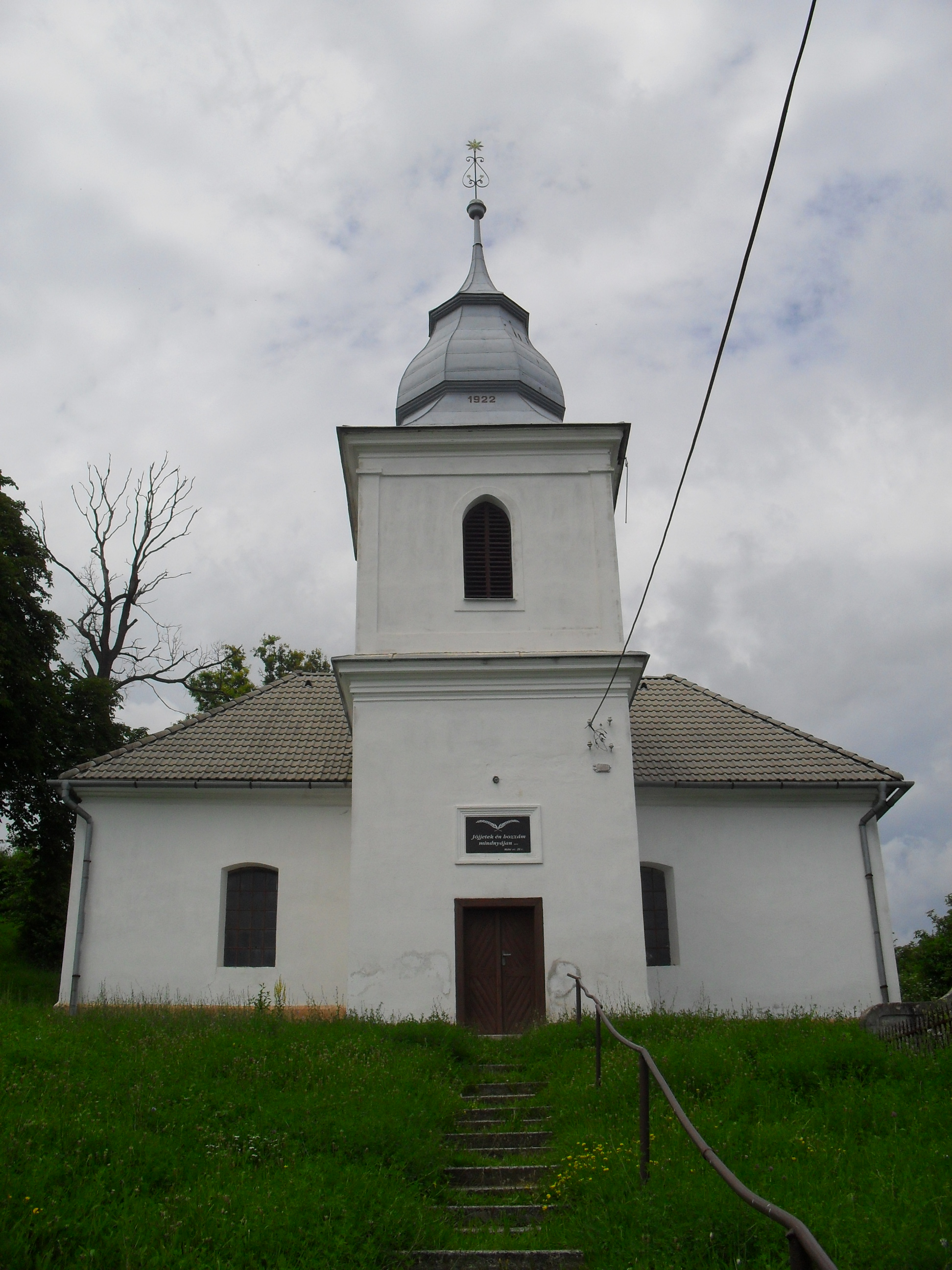

- Flag

- Location of Tomášovce in the Banská Bystrica Region Location of Tomášovce in Slovakia
- Coordinates: 48.39°N 20.15°E
- Country: Slovakia
- Region: Banská Bystrica Region
- District: Rimavská Sobota District
- First mentioned: 1405

Area
  - Total: 6.44 km^{2} (2.49 sq mi)
- Elevation: 184 m (604 ft)

Population (2025)
  - Total: 258
- Time zone: UTC+1 (CET)
  - Summer (DST): UTC+2 (CEST)
- Postal code: 980 21
- Area code: +421 47
- Vehicle registration plate (until 2022): RS

Tomášovce (Hungarian: Balogtamási) is a village and municipality in the Rimavská Sobota District of the Banská Bystrica Region of southern Slovakia.

== Population ==
Population statistic (10 years)
Year	1995	2005	2015	2025
Count	218	200	196	258
Difference		−8.25%	−2%	+31.63%

Population statistic
Year	2024	2025
Count	248	258
Difference		+4.03%

It has a population of 258 people (31 December 2025).

=== Ethnicity ===
Census 2021 (1+ %)
Ethnicity	Number	Fraction
Hungarian	173	84.39%
Romani	57	27.8%
Slovak	28	13.65%
Not found out	21	10.24%
Total	205	

In year 2021 was 205 people by ethnicity 173 as Hungarian, 57 as Romani, 28 as Slovak, 21 as Not found out and 2 as Czech.

Note on population: The difference values of population numbers in the table "Population statistic" and in the sections "Ethnicity" & "Religion" is caused by the use of various statistical methods.

=== Religion ===
Census 2021 (1+ %)
Religion	Number	Fraction
Roman Catholic Church	89	43.41%
Calvinist Church	56	27.32%
None	49	23.9%
Not found out	5	2.44%
Evangelical Church	5	2.44%
Total	205	

In year 2021 was 205 people by religion 89 from Roman Catholic Church, 56 from Calvinist Church, 49 from None, 5 from Not found out, 5 from Evangelical Church and 1 from Old Catholic Church.
