= Bílovice =

- Municipality
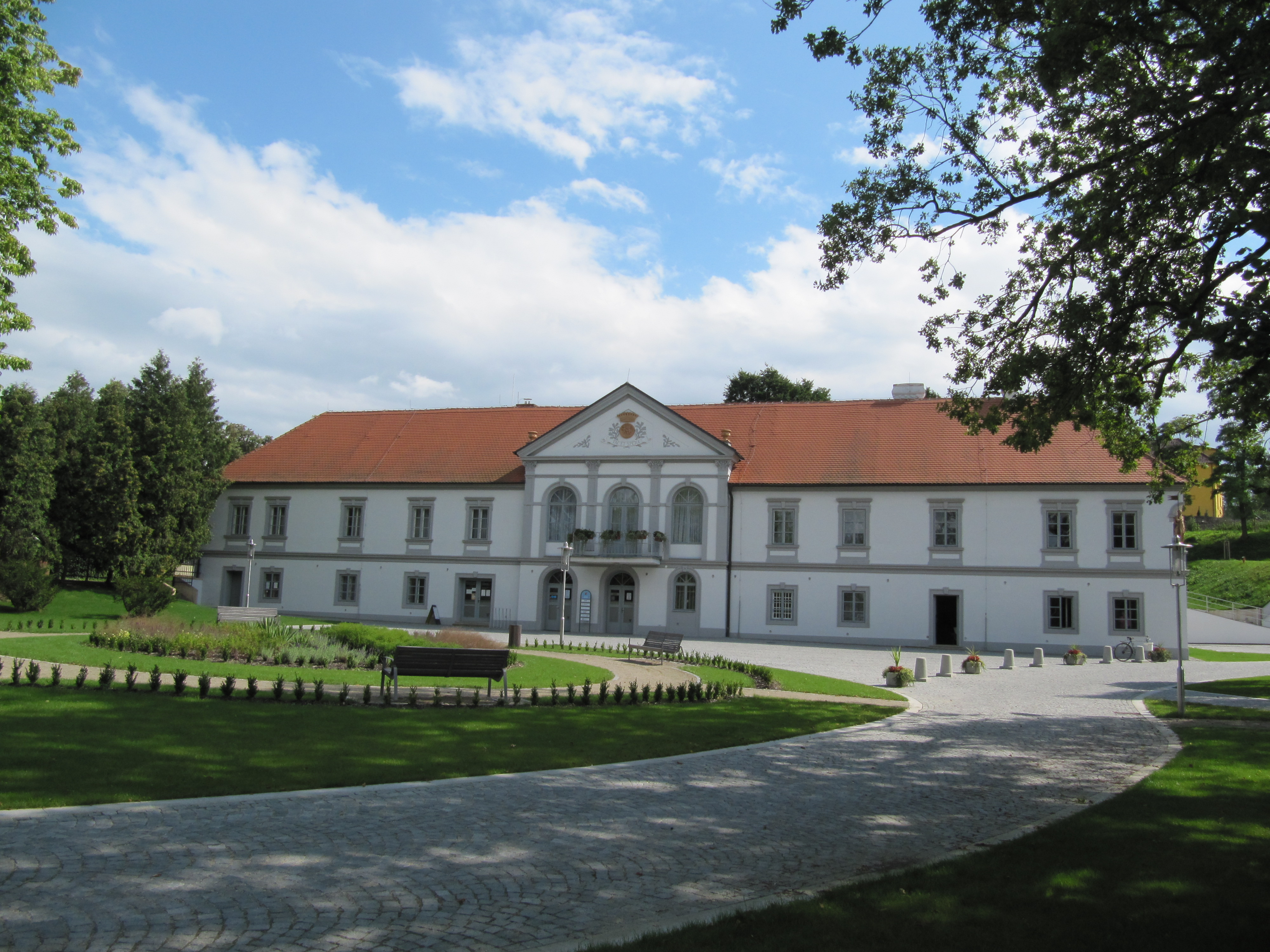
- Bílovice Castle

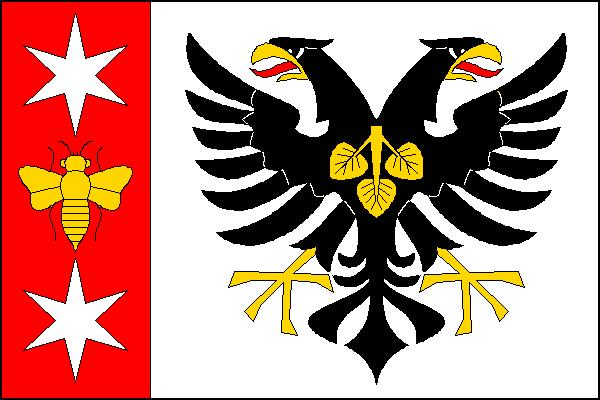
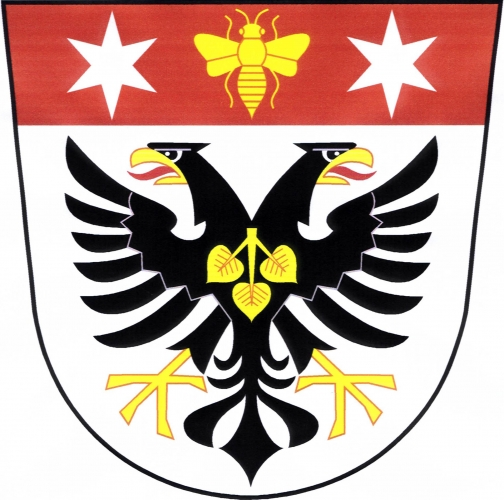
- Flag Coat of arms

- Location in the Czech Republic
- Coordinates: 49°5′59″N 17°32′59″E
- Country: Czech Republic
- Region: Zlín
- District: Uherské Hradiště
- First mentioned: 1256

Area
  - Total: 6.58 km^{2} (2.54 sq mi)
- Elevation: 194 m (636 ft)

Population (2026-01-01)
  - Total: 1,944
  - Density: 295/km^{2} (765/sq mi)
- Time zone: UTC+1 (CET)
  - Summer (DST): UTC+2 (CEST)
- Postal code: 687 12
- Website: bilovice.cz

Bílovice is a municipality and village in Uherské Hradiště District in the Zlín Region of the Czech Republic. It has about 1,900 inhabitants.

Bílovice lies approximately 8 kilometres (5 mi) north-east of Uherské Hradiště, 17 km (11 mi) south-west of Zlín, and 252 km (157 mi) south-east of Prague.

== Administrative division ==
Bílovice consists of two municipal parts (in brackets population according to the 2021 census):

- Bílovice (1,494)
- Včelary (375)

== Demographics ==
Historical population
Year	Pop.	±%
1869	901	—
1880	1,001	+11.1%
1890	1,052	+5.1%
1900	1,173	+11.5%
1910	1,359	+15.9%
1921	1,364	+0.4%
1930	1,364	+0.0%
1950	1,447	+6.1%
1961	1,660	+14.7%
1970	1,621	−2.3%
1980	1,663	+2.6%
1991	1,590	−4.4%
2001	1,621	+1.9%
2011	1,751	+8.0%
2021	1,869	+6.7%
Source: Censuses
