= Johann Christoph von Bartenstein =

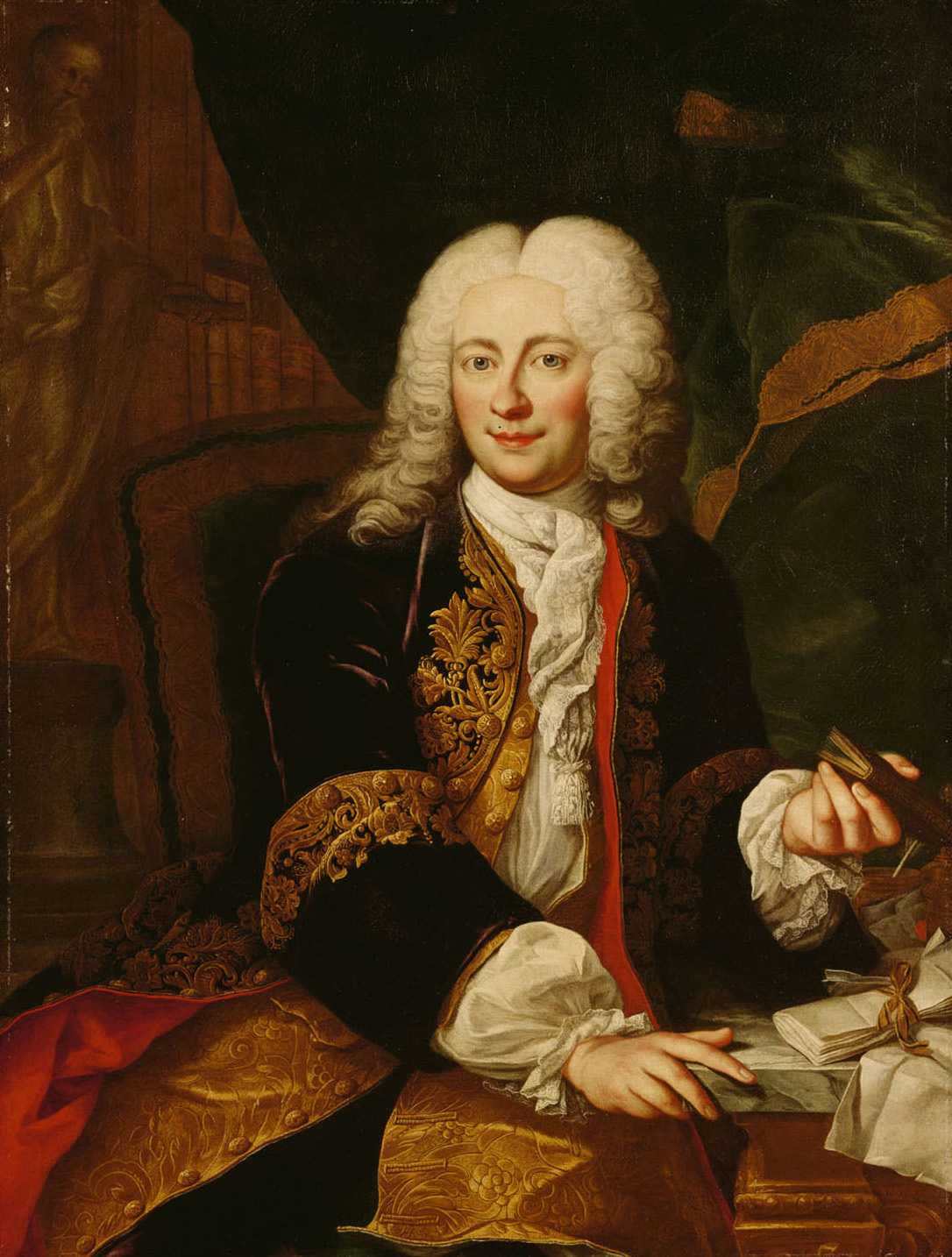
Johann Christoph Freiherr von Bartenstein, by Martin van Meytens

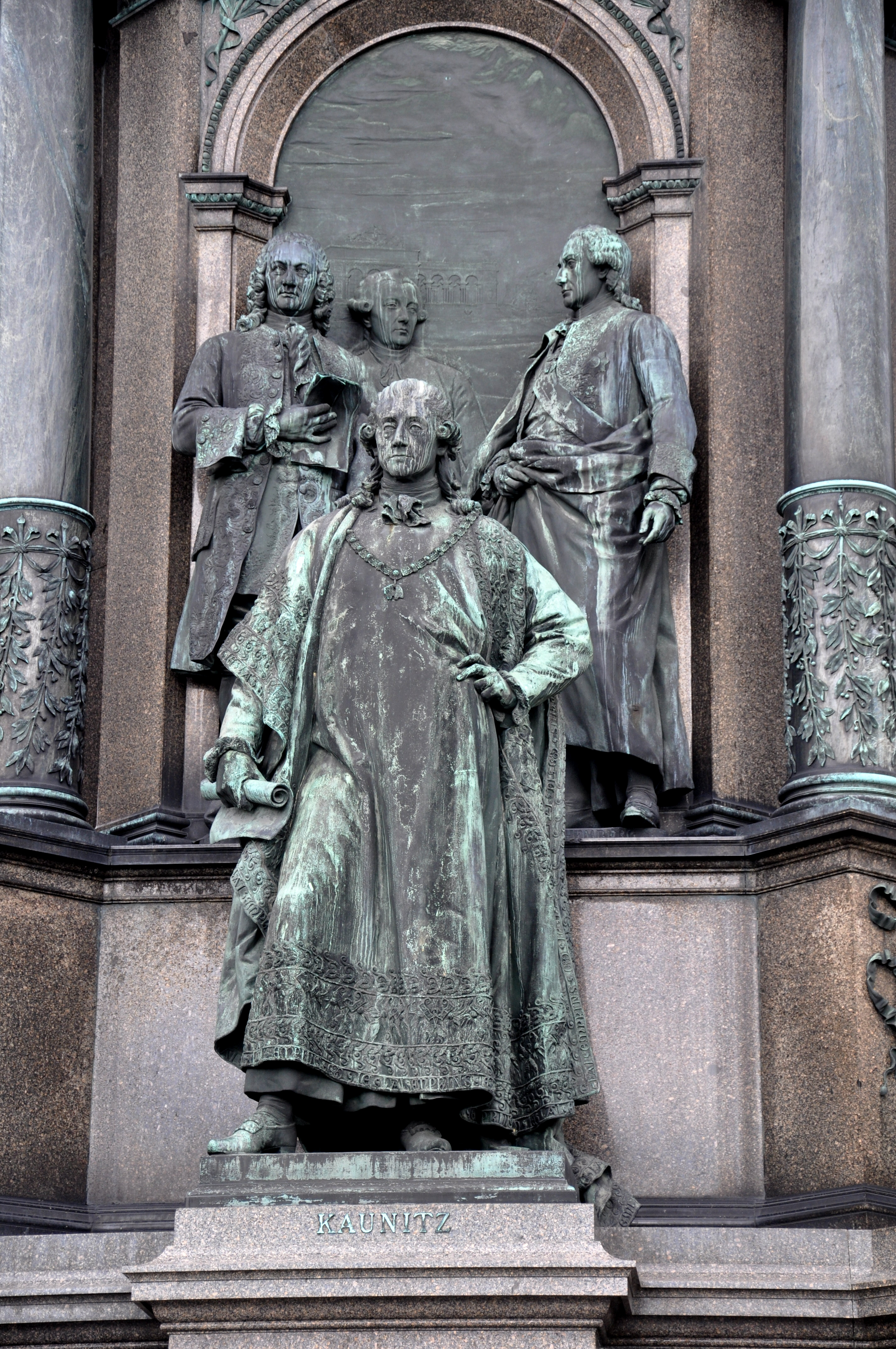
Bartenstein (left) as one of the 4 advisors on the Maria-Theresia Memorial in Vienna

Johann Christoph Bartenstein (Strasbourg, 23 October 1689 – Vienna, 5 August 1767) was an Austrian statesman, who dominated the foreign policy of the Habsburg monarchy from the early 1730s until 1753.

== Life ==
Bartenstein grew up in Strasbourg in a strictly Lutheran family: his father Johann Philipp Bartenstein (1650–1726) was a professor of philosophy who had moved from Thuringia and headed the Strasbourg high school; his mother came from a Strasbourg middle-class family. The young Bartenstein studied languages, history and law in Strasbourg.

After working for the Benedictines of Saint-Maur in Paris, he went to Vienna in 1714, where he met Gottfried Wilhelm Leibniz, who encouraged him to pursue a career in the state administration. In 1715, the young Bartenstein converted to the Catholic faith in order to pursue a career in the Austrian administration, and made a spectacular career at the Habsburg imperial court in the 1720s and 1730s.

Bartenstein first became a secretary and in 1727 became the Protocol Chief of the Secret Council, the supreme government authority in Vienna. This made him the closest confidant and adviser to Emperor Charles VI, who gradually allowed himself to be completely guided in foreign affairs by Bartenstein. The rapid rise of Bartenstein also led to a reduction in influence in the last years of Prince Eugene's life, who had dominated the imperial foreign policy for decades.

In 1732, Bartenstein became a baron and was promoted to Privy Councilor and Vice-Chancellor in the Austrian State Chancellery. After Karl's death in 1740, he remained close to his unexperienced daughter and successor, Maria Theresia, and shaped Habsburg domestic and foreign policy for years.

Her played an important role in arranging the very happy marriage between Maria Theresia and Francis of Lorraine, followed by the accession of Francis as Emperor of the Holy Roman Empire in 1745. This brilliant diplomatic achievement secured Bartenstein the lifelong loyalty of the Empress.

As Maria Theresia grew more experienced, she gradually took over the conduct of foreign policy from Bartenstein. In 1753, the now 64-year-old Bartenstein was replaced by Wenzel Anton von Kaunitz-Rietberg as head of foreign policy.

Even after his resignation, he was able to retain the affection of Maria Theresa, who entrusted him with the education of her son Joseph. In 1764, he became Knight of the Order of Saint Stephen of Hungary.

== Sources ==
- Britannica
- BLKÖ
- Johann Christoph von Bartenstein in Austria-Forum (in German) (at AEIOU)
- Deutsche Biographie
