= Tomášovce, Lučenec District =

Tomášovce Losonctamási
- Municipality
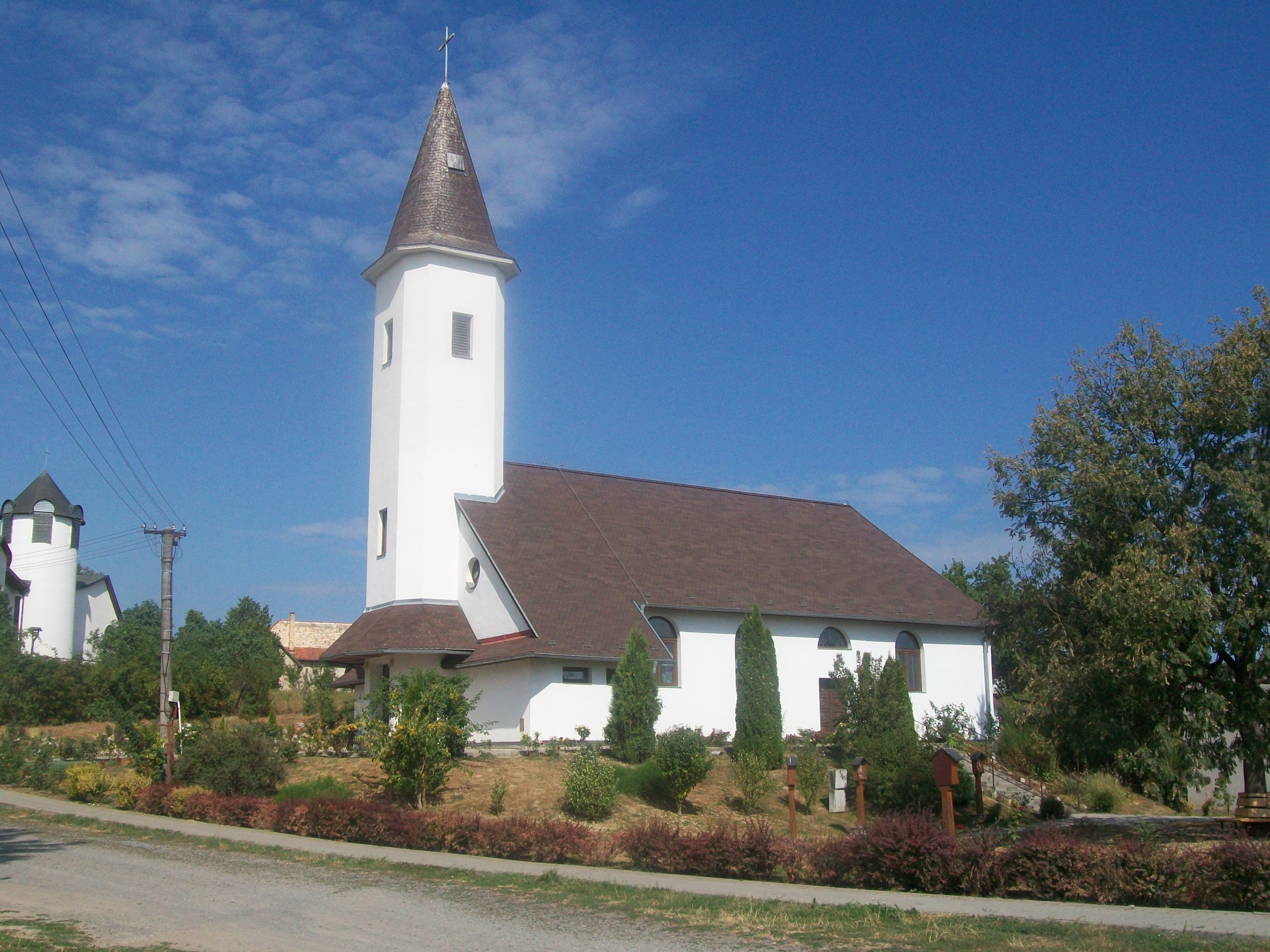
- Roman Catholic church of St. Peter and Paul

- Flag Coat of arms

- Location of Tomášovce in the Banská Bystrica Region Location of Tomášovce in Slovakia
- Coordinates: 48.372°N 19.619°E
- Country: Slovakia
- Region: Banská Bystrica Region
- District: Lučenec District
- First mentioned: 1293

Area
  - Total: 14.10 km^{2} (5.44 sq mi)
- Elevation: 202 m (663 ft)

Population (2025)
  - Total: 1,312
- Time zone: UTC+1 (CET)
  - Summer (DST): UTC+2 (CEST)
- Postal code: 985 56
- Area code: +421 47
- Vehicle registration plate (until 2022): LC
- Website: www.tomasovce.sk

Tomášovce (Hungarian: Losonctamási) is a village and municipality in the Lučenec District in the Banská Bystrica Region of Slovakia.

== Population ==
Population statistic (10 years)
Year	1995	2005	2015	2025
Count	1521	1493	1396	1312
Difference		−1.84%	−6.49%	−6.01%

Population statistic
Year	2024	2025
Count	1338	1312
Difference		−1.94%

It has a population of 1312 people (31 December 2025).

=== Ethnicity ===
Census 2021 (1+ %)
Ethnicity	Number	Fraction
Slovak	1322	96.21%
Not found out	27	1.96%
Hungarian	22	1.6%
Total	1374	

In year 2021 was 1374 people by ethnicity 1322 as Slovak, 27 as Not found out, 22 as Hungarian, 5 as Czech, 3 as Romani, 3 as Other, 1 as Jewish, 1 as Irish, 1 as Ukrainian, 1 as Russian, 1 as Romanian, 1 as German, 1 as Moravian and 1 as Greek.

Note on population: The difference values of population numbers in the table "Population statistic" and in the sections "Ethnicity" & "Religion" is caused by the use of various statistical methods.

=== Religion ===
Census 2021 (1+ %)
Religion	Number	Fraction
Roman Catholic Church	582	42.36%
Evangelical Church	380	27.66%
None	344	25.04%
Not found out	32	2.33%
Total	1374	

In year 2021 was 1374 people by religion 582 from Roman Catholic Church, 380 from Evangelical Church, 344 from None, 32 from Not found out, 9 from Greek Catholic Church, 8 from Paganism and natural spirituality, 8 from Ad hoc movements, 5 from Baptists Church, 2 from Jehovah's Witnesses, 2 from Buddhism, 1 from Eastern Orthodox Church and 1 from Other and not ascertained christian church.
