= Budikovany =

Budikovany Bugyikfala
- Municipality
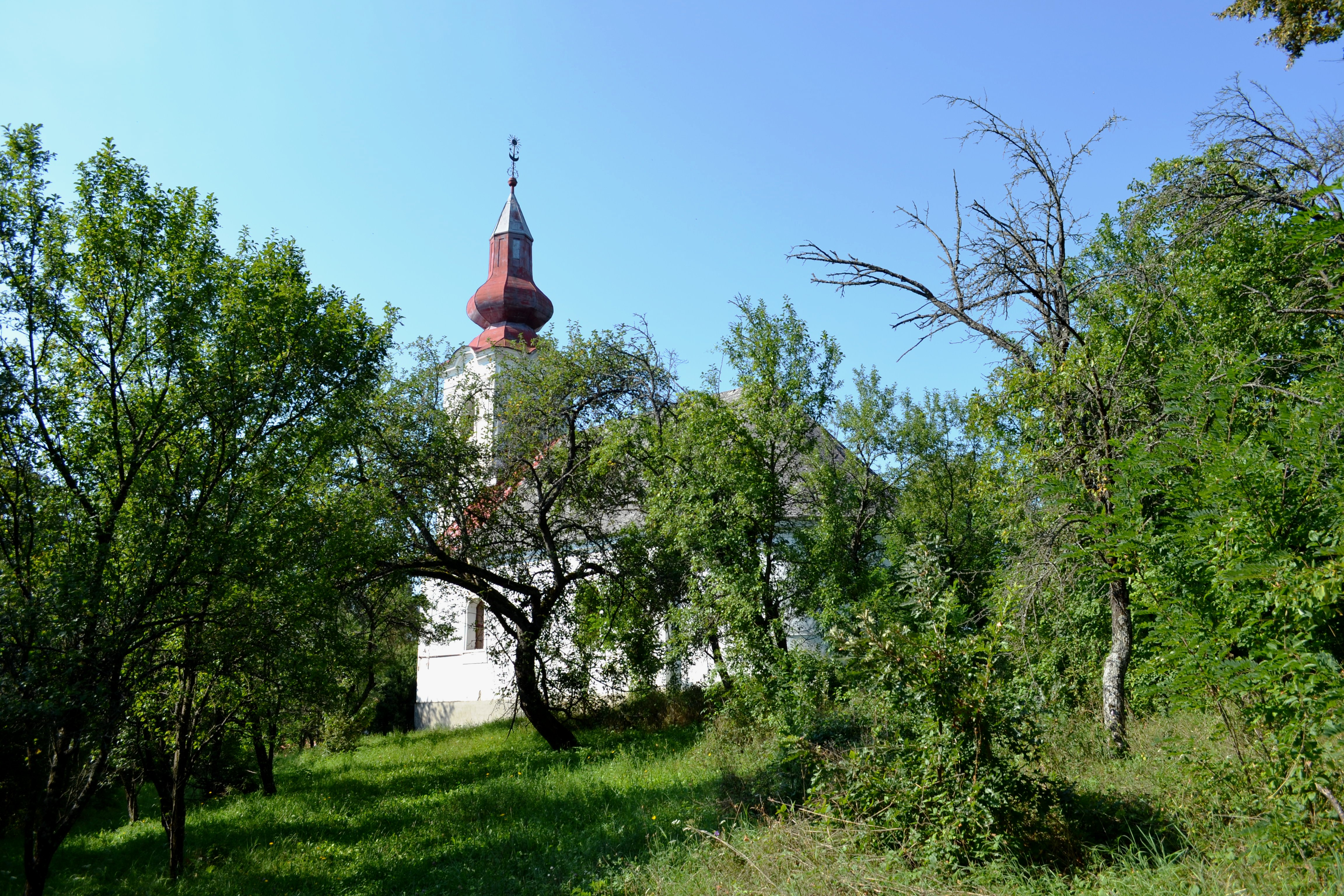
- Lutheran church

- Flag

- Location of Budikovany in the Banská Bystrica Region Location of Budikovany in Slovakia
- Coordinates: 48.48°N 20.10°E
- Country: Slovakia
- Region: Banská Bystrica Region
- District: Rimavská Sobota District
- First mentioned: 1301

Area
  - Total: 3.33 km^{2} (1.29 sq mi)
- Elevation: 221 m (725 ft)

Population (2025)
  - Total: 62
- Time zone: UTC+1 (CET)
  - Summer (DST): UTC+2 (CEST)
- Postal code: 980 23
- Area code: +421 47
- Vehicle registration plate (until 2022): RS
- Website: budikovany.webnode.sk

Budikovany (Hungarian: Bugyikfala) is a village and municipality in the Rimavská Sobota District of the Banská Bystrica Region of southern Slovakia. Village is situated on the north-east shore of Teplý Vrch (warm hill) lake where river Blh and Drienok creek meet. Today it is a small farming village and a popular place for visitors and outdoors enthusiasts. The village now profits from the proximity of Teplý vrch lake.

== Geography ==
The municipality lies at an altitude of 221 metres (725 ft) and covers an area of 3.33 km^{2} (1.29 sq mi) (2025).

== History ==
In the 18th century the village was the property of Muráň castle owners, In 1773 had Budikovany 41 homesteads, in 1828 36 houses. Locals had been engaged in agriculture, wax production, weaving, and fruit growing.

== Population ==
Population statistic (10 years)
Year	1995	2005	2015	2025
Count	67	56	61	62
Difference		−16.41%	+8.92%	+1.63%

Population statistic
Year	2024	2025
Count	66	62
Difference		−6.06%

It has a population of 62 people (31 December 2025).

=== Ethnicity ===
Census 2021 (1+ %)
Ethnicity	Number	Fraction
Slovak	59	95.16%
Hungarian	4	6.45%
Romani	1	1.61%
Russian	1	1.61%
Not found out	1	1.61%
Total	62	

In year 2021 was 62 people by ethnicity 59 as Slovak, 4 as Hungarian, 1 as Romani, 1 as Russian and 1 as Not found out.

Note on population: The difference values of population numbers in the table "Population statistic" and in the sections "Ethnicity" & "Religion" is caused by the use of various statistical methods.

=== Religion ===
Census 2021 (1+ %)
Religion	Number	Fraction
Roman Catholic Church	29	46.77%
None	22	35.48%
Evangelical Church	8	12.9%
Not found out	1	1.61%
Buddhism	1	1.61%
Ad hoc movements	1	1.61%
Total	62	

In year 2021 was 62 people by religion 29 from Roman Catholic Church, 22 from None, 8 from Evangelical Church, 1 from Not found out, 1 from Buddhism and 1 from Ad hoc movements.

== See also ==
- List of municipalities and towns in Slovakia

== Genealogical resources ==
The records for genealogical research are available at the state archive "Statny Archiv in Banska Bystrica, Slovakia"

- Roman Catholic church records (births/marriages/deaths): 1829-1887 (parish B)
- Lutheran church records (births/marriages/deaths): 1743-1841 (parish A)
