= Teplý Vrch =

Teplý Vrch Meleghegy
- Municipality
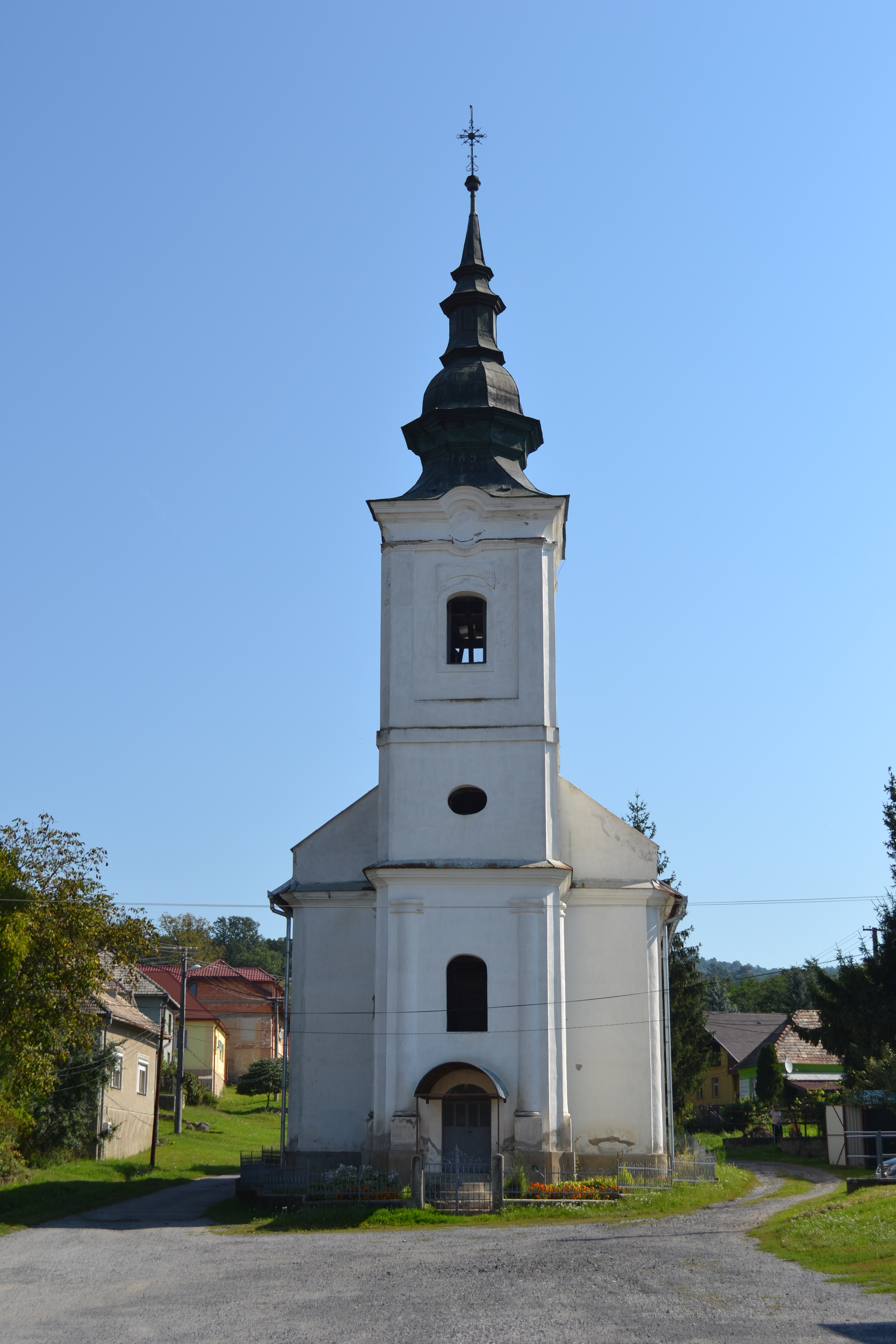
- Lutheran church

- Flag

- Location of Teplý Vrch in the Banská Bystrica Region Location of Teplý Vrch in Slovakia
- Coordinates: 48.47°N 20.10°E
- Country: Slovakia
- Region: Banská Bystrica Region
- District: Rimavská Sobota District
- First mentioned: 1301

Area
  - Total: 5.98 km^{2} (2.31 sq mi)
- Elevation: 217 m (712 ft)

Population (2025)
  - Total: 306
- Time zone: UTC+1 (CET)
  - Summer (DST): UTC+2 (CEST)
- Postal code: 980 23
- Area code: +421 47
- Vehicle registration plate (until 2022): RS
- Website: www.teplyvrch.com

Teplý Vrch (Hungarian: Meleghegy) is a village and municipality in the Rimavská Sobota District of the Banská Bystrica Region of southern Slovakia.

== Geography ==
The municipality lies at an altitude of 217 metres (712 ft) and covers an area of 5.98 km^{2} (2.31 sq mi) (2025).

== Tourism ==
It is known for the warmest geothermal lake in Slovakia (27 °C, 80 F). A hotel, camping site and several accommodation facilities are at disposal in the village. It is a popular summer resort in Banská Bystrica Region. A menagerie is located in the village.

== Population ==
Population statistic (10 years)
Year	1995	2005	2015	2025
Count	300	297	281	306
Difference		−1%	−5.38%	+8.89%

Population statistic
Year	2024	2025
Count	304	306
Difference		+0.65%

It has a population of 306 people (31 December 2025).

=== Ethnicity ===
Census 2021 (1+ %)
Ethnicity	Number	Fraction
Slovak	274	93.83%
Not found out	17	5.82%
Hungarian	7	2.39%
Total	292	

In year 2021 was 292 people by ethnicity 274 as Slovak, 17 as Not found out, 7 as Hungarian, 2 as Other, 1 as Vietnamese and 1 as Albanian.

Note on population: The difference values of population numbers in the table "Population statistic" and in the sections "Ethnicity" & "Religion" is caused by the use of various statistical methods.

=== Religion ===
Census 2021 (1+ %)
Religion	Number	Fraction
None	103	35.27%
Roman Catholic Church	90	30.82%
Evangelical Church	78	26.71%
Not found out	13	4.45%
Calvinist Church	3	1.03%
Total	292	

In year 2021 was 292 people by religion 103 from None, 90 from Roman Catholic Church, 78 from Evangelical Church, 13 from Not found out, 3 from Calvinist Church, 2 from Other, 1 from Greek Catholic Church, 1 from Buddhism and 1 from Baptists Church.
