= Včelince =

Včelince Méhi
- Municipality
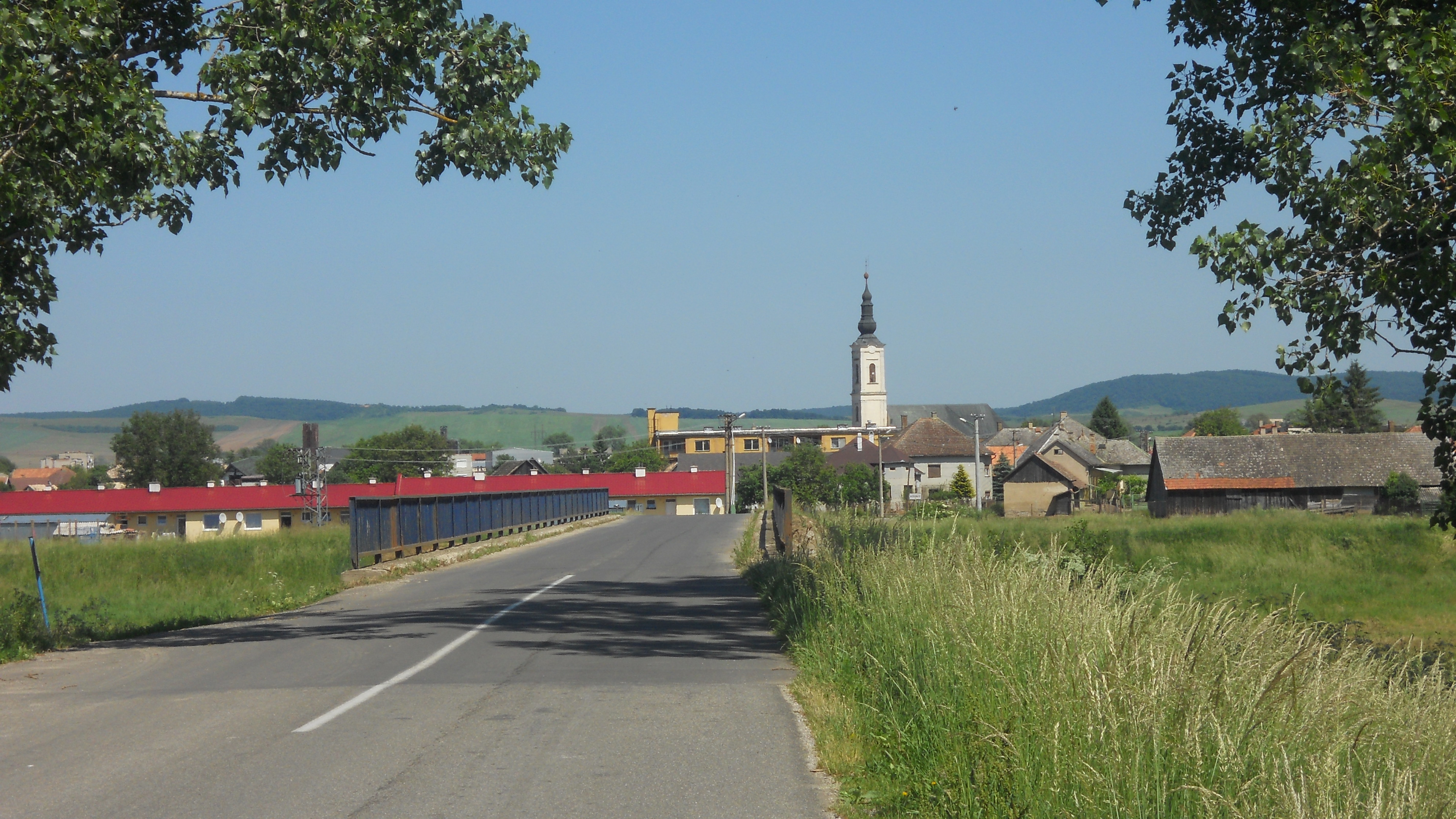

- Flag

- Location of Včelince in the Banská Bystrica Region Location of Včelince in Slovakia
- Coordinates: 48.38°N 20.30°E
- Country: Slovakia
- Region: Banská Bystrica Region
- District: Rimavská Sobota District
- First mentioned: 1332

Area
  - Total: 13.11 km^{2} (5.06 sq mi)
- Elevation: 169 m (554 ft)

Population (2025)
  - Total: 811
- Time zone: UTC+1 (CET)
  - Summer (DST): UTC+2 (CEST)
- Postal code: 980 50
- Area code: +421 47
- Vehicle registration plate (until 2022): RS
- Website: www.obecvcelince.sk

Včelince (Hungarian: Méhi) is a village and municipality in the Rimavská Sobota District of the Banská Bystrica Region of southern Slovakia.

== Geography ==
The municipality lies at an altitude of 169 metres (554 ft) and covers an area of 13.11 km^{2} (5.06 sq mi) (2025).

== Population ==
Population statistic (10 years)
| Year | 1995 | 2005 | 2015 | 2025 |
|---|---|---|---|---|
| Count | 700 | 775 | 796 | 811 |
| Difference | | +10.71% | +2.70% | +1.88% |

Population statistic
| Year | 2024 | 2025 |
|---|---|---|
| Count | 816 | 811 |
| Difference | | −0.61% |

It has a population of 811 people (31 December 2025).

=== Ethnicity ===
Census 2021 (1+ %)
| Ethnicity | Number | Fraction |
|---|---|---|
| Hungarian | 537 | 68.06% |
| Slovak | 193 | 24.46% |
| Romani | 152 | 19.26% |
| Not found out | 12 | 1.52% |
| Total | 789 | |

In year 2021 was 789 people by ethnicity 537 as Hungarian, 193 as Slovak, 152 as Romani, 12 as Not found out, 4 as Czech, 4 as German and 1 as Russian.

Note on population: The difference values of population numbers in the table "Population statistic" and in the sections "Ethnicity" & "Religion" is caused by the use of various statistical methods.

=== Religion ===
Census 2021 (1+ %)
| Religion | Number | Fraction |
|---|---|---|
| Roman Catholic Church | 371 | 47.02% |
| None | 196 | 24.84% |
| Not found out | 113 | 14.32% |
| Calvinist Church | 64 | 8.11% |
| Jehovah's Witnesses | 14 | 1.77% |
| Greek Catholic Church | 13 | 1.65% |
| Evangelical Church | 13 | 1.65% |
| Total | 789 | |

In year 2021 was 789 people by religion 371 from Roman Catholic Church, 196 from None, 113 from Not found out, 64 from Calvinist Church, 14 from Jehovah's Witnesses, 13 from Greek Catholic Church, 13 from Evangelical Church, 3 from United Methodist Church, 1 from Christian Congregations in Slovakia and 1 from Ad hoc movements.
