= Bottovo =

Bottovo Gernyő
- Municipality
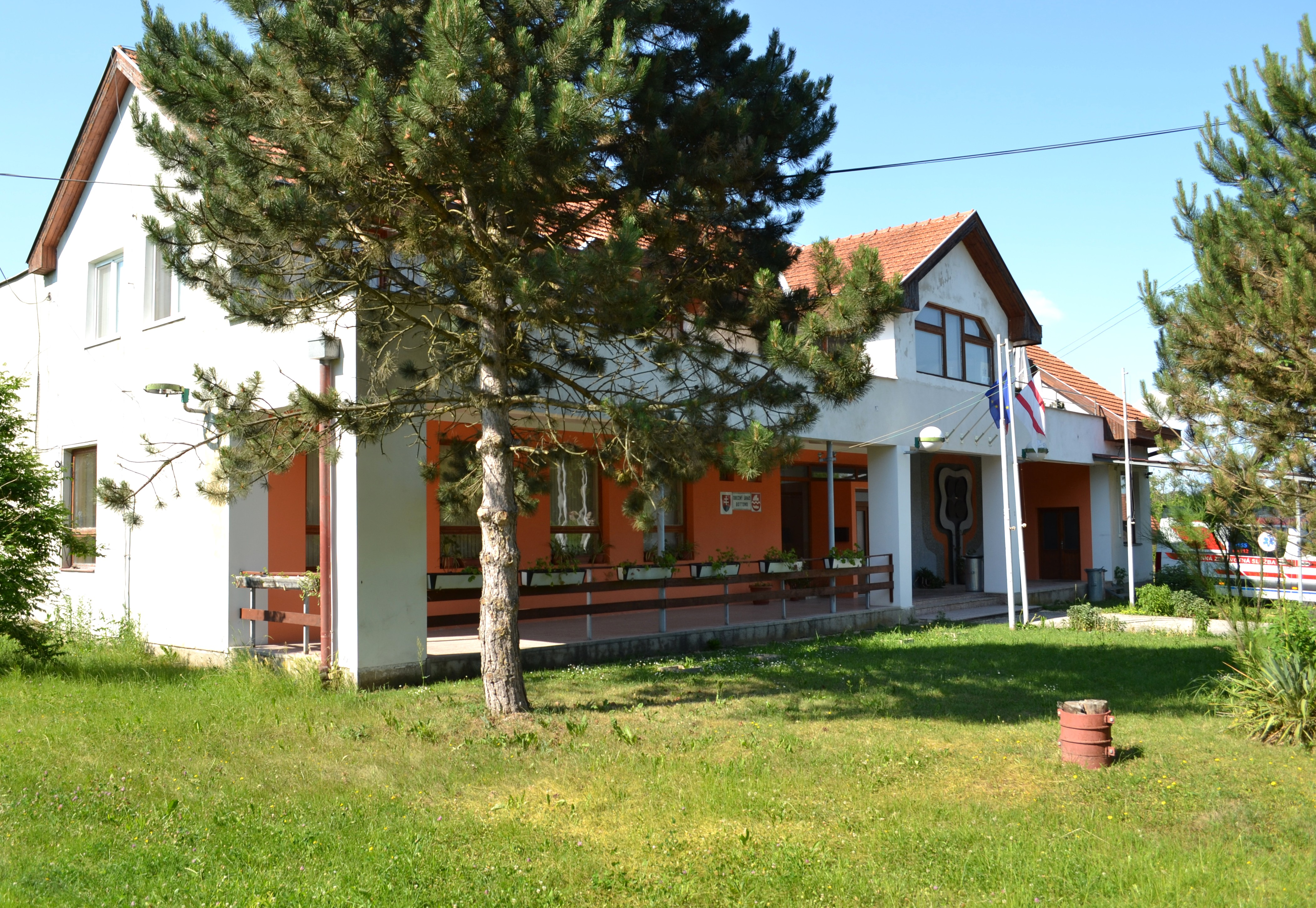

- Flag

- Location of Bottovo in the Banská Bystrica Region Location of Bottovo in Slovakia
- Coordinates: 48.33°N 20.15°E
- Country: Slovakia
- Region: Banská Bystrica Region
- District: Rimavská Sobota District
- First mentioned: 1926

Area
  - Total: 10.78 km^{2} (4.16 sq mi)
- Elevation: 196 m (643 ft)

Population (2025)
  - Total: 203
- Time zone: UTC+1 (CET)
  - Summer (DST): UTC+2 (CEST)
- Postal code: 980 41
- Area code: +421 47
- Vehicle registration plate (until 2022): RS
- Website: www.bottovo.sk

Bottovo (Hungarian: Gernyő) is a village and municipality in the Rimavská Sobota District of the Banská Bystrica Region of Slovakia. In the village is gym hall, foodstuff store, public library and a football pitch.

== Geography ==
The municipality lies at an altitude of 196 metres (643 ft) and covers an area of 10.78 km^{2} (4.16 sq mi) (2025).

== Population ==
Population statistic (10 years)
Year	1995	2005	2015	2025
Count	199	223	205	203
Difference		+12.06%	−8.07%	−0.97%

Population statistic
Year	2024	2025
Count	201	203
Difference		+0.99%

It has a population of 203 people (31 December 2025).

=== Ethnicity ===
Census 2021 (1+ %)
Ethnicity	Number	Fraction
Slovak	178	90.35%
Czech	8	4.06%
Hungarian	8	4.06%
Not found out	7	3.55%
Moravian	2	1.01%
Total	197	

In year 2021 was 197 people by ethnicity 178 as Slovak, 8 as Czech, 8 as Hungarian, 7 as Not found out and 2 as Moravian.

Note on population: The difference values of population numbers in the table "Population statistic" and in the sections "Ethnicity" & "Religion" is caused by the use of various statistical methods.

=== Religion ===
Census 2021 (1+ %)
Religion	Number	Fraction
Roman Catholic Church	101	51.27%
None	59	29.95%
Evangelical Church	19	9.64%
Not found out	7	3.55%
Calvinist Church	4	2.03%
Old Catholic Church	2	1.02%
Greek Catholic Church	2	1.02%
Ad hoc movements	2	1.02%
Total	197	

In year 2021 was 197 people by religion 101 from Roman Catholic Church, 59 from None, 19 from Evangelical Church, 7 from Not found out, 4 from Calvinist Church, 2 from Old Catholic Church, 2 from Greek Catholic Church, 2 from Ad hoc movements and 1 from Paganism and natural spirituality.
