= Valice =

Municipality of Slovakia

Valice Alsóvály
- Municipality
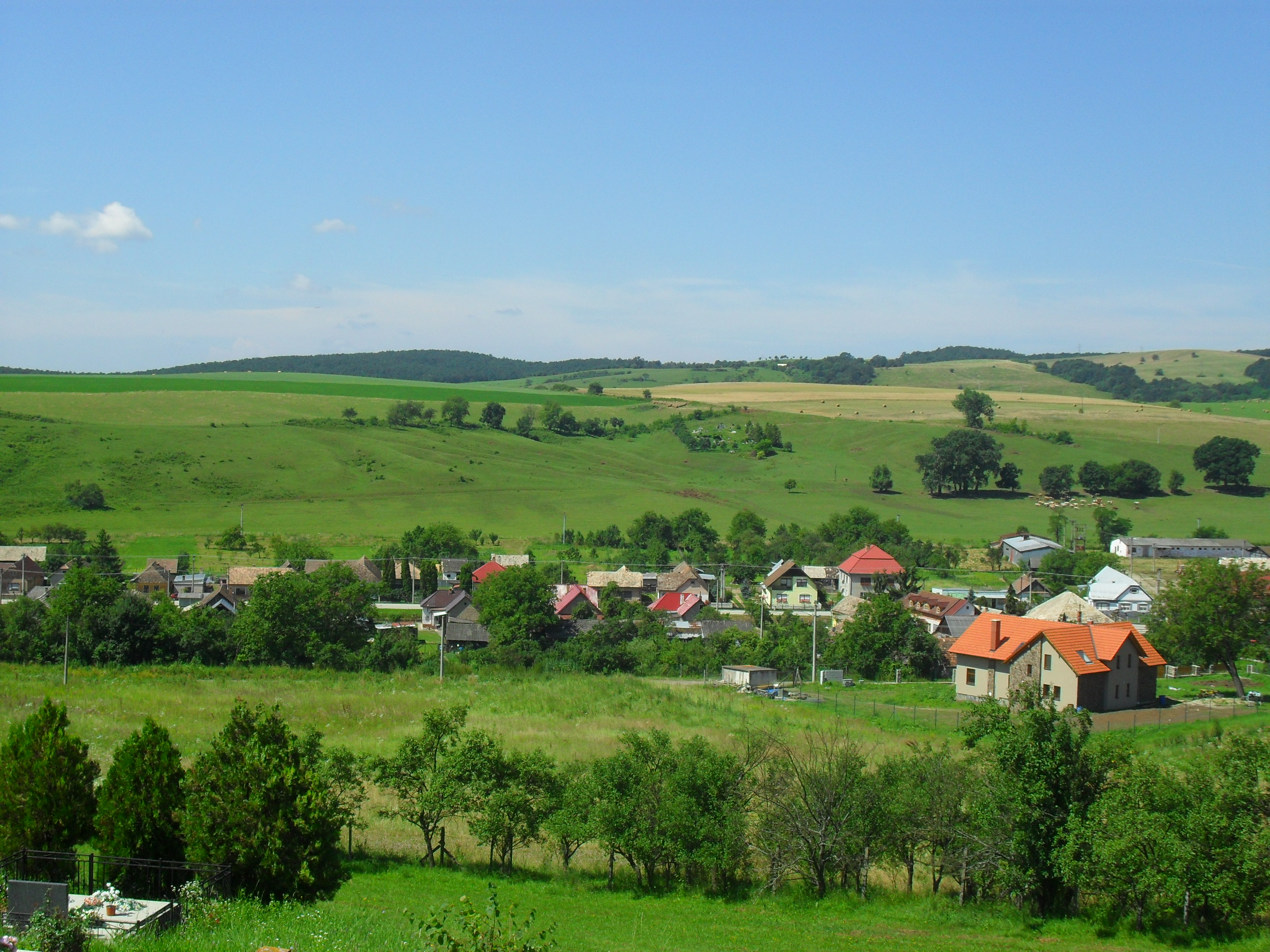

- Flag Coat of arms

- Location of Valice in the Banská Bystrica Region Location of Valice in Slovakia
- Coordinates: 48.47°N 20.20°E
- Country: Slovakia
- Region: Banská Bystrica Region
- District: Rimavská Sobota District
- First mentioned: 1247

Area
  - Total: 7.46 km^{2} (2.88 sq mi)
- Elevation: 213 m (699 ft)

Population (2025)
  - Total: 355
- Time zone: UTC+1 (CET)
  - Summer (DST): UTC+2 (CEST)
- Postal code: 982 52
- Area code: +421 47
- Vehicle registration plate (until 2022): RS
- Website: obecvalice.sk

Valice (Hungarian: Alsóvály) is a village and municipality in the Rimavská Sobota District of the Banská Bystrica Region of southern Slovakia.

== Geography ==
The municipality lies at an altitude of 213 metres (699 ft) and covers an area of 7.46 km^{2} (2.88 sq mi) (2025).

== Population ==
Population statistic (10 years)
Year	1995	2005	2015	2025
Count	328	317	321	355
Difference		−3.35%	+1.26%	+10.59%

Population statistic
Year	2024	2025
Count	335	355
Difference		+5.97%

It has a population of 355 people (31 December 2025).

=== Ethnicity ===
Census 2021 (1+ %)
Ethnicity	Number	Fraction
Hungarian	250	78.36%
Romani	166	52.03%
Slovak	63	19.74%
Not found out	16	5.01%
Total	319	

In year 2021 was 319 people by ethnicity 250 as Hungarian, 166 as Romani, 63 as Slovak and 16 as Not found out.

Note on population: The difference values of population numbers in the table "Population statistic" and in the sections "Ethnicity" & "Religion" is caused by the use of various statistical methods.

=== Religion ===
Census 2021 (1+ %)
Religion	Number	Fraction
Roman Catholic Church	171	53.61%
Calvinist Church	65	20.38%
None	43	13.48%
Evangelical Church	25	7.84%
Not found out	10	3.13%
Total	319	

In year 2021 was 319 people by religion 171 from Roman Catholic Church, 65 from Calvinist Church, 43 from None, 25 from Evangelical Church, 10 from Not found out, 3 from United Methodist Church, 1 from Other and not ascertained christian church and 1 from Greek Catholic Church.
