= Podhorie =

Podhorie may refer to several villages and municipalities in Slovakia:

- Podhorie, Banská Štiavnica District
- Podhorie, Žilina District
