= Lysica (disambiguation) =

Lysica or Łysica may refer to:

- Lysica, a village in Slovakia
- Łysica, a mountain in Poland
- A former name of a former village which now part of the Polish city of Krynica Morska
