= Lukáš Jánošík =

Slovak footballer

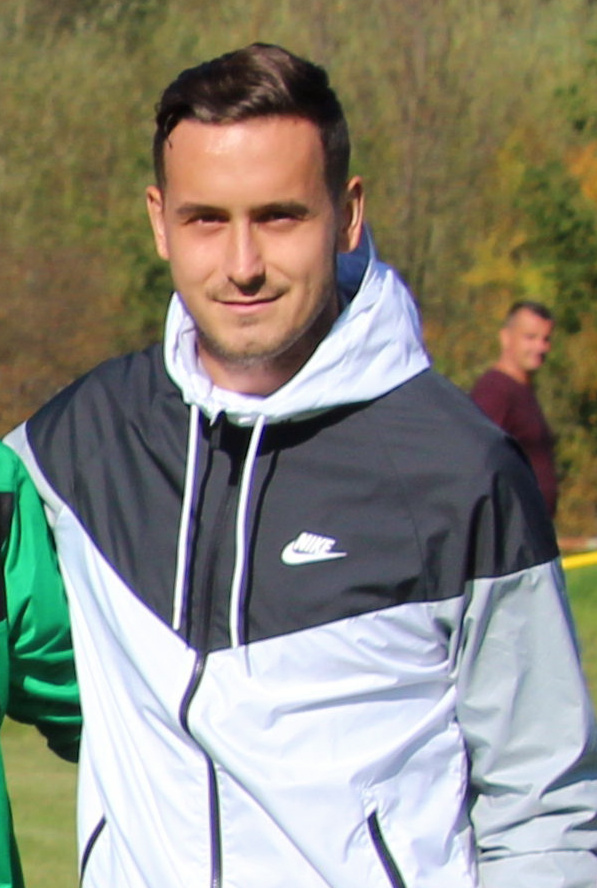

Personal information
- Date of birth: 5 March 1994 (age 32)
- Place of birth: Hôrky, Slovakia
- Height: 1.78 m (5 ft 10 in)
- Position: Winger

Team information
- Current team: MŠK Považská Bystrica
- Number: 7

Youth career
- Žilina

Senior career*
| Years | Team | Apps | (Gls) |
| 2013–2015 | Žilina B | 46 | (18) |
| 2013 | → Rimavská Sobota (loan) | 20 | (2) |
| 2014–2015 | → Tatran Liptovský Mikuláš (loan) | 46 | (11) |
| 2015–2020 | Žilina | 66 | (11) |
| 2020–2021 | Dynamo České Budějovice | 13 | (2) |
| 2021–2022 | Žilina | 16 | (2) |
| 2021–2022 | → Žilina B | 6 | (1) |
| 2022–2024 | Zemplín Michalovce | 51 | (5) |
| 2024– | Považská Bystrica | 9 | (0) |
- * Club domestic league appearances and goals as of 2 January 2025

Lukáš Jánošík (born 5 March 1994) is a Slovak professional footballer who plays for MŠK Považská Bystrica as a winger.

Jánošík began his career at Žilina, where he started playing for the reserves and went on loan to Rimavská Sobota and Tatran Liptovský Mikuláš, before being promoted to the first team, for whom he played for five seasons. After spending a year in the Czech Republic with Dynamo České Budějovice, Jánošík returned to Žilina, where he played for another season before joining Michalovce in 2022.

== Career ==
=== MŠK Žilina ===
Jánošík started at Žilina with the club's B-team, also spending time out on loan at Rimavská Sobota for half a season, followed by a season with second-division side Tatran Liptovský Mikuláš.

Jánošík made his professional debut for Žilina in the Slovak First Football League against Ružomberok on 7 November 2015. In the game he was featured in the starting line-up, but was replaced 16 minutes before the end of the game by later international Jaroslav Mihalík. Šošoni won the game 2–0.

In April 2020, Jánošík was released from Žilina, as the club had entered liquidation, due to the coronavirus pandemic. He left the club with Slovak First Football League totals of 11 goals in 66 matches.

=== Dynamo České Budějovice ===
Czech side Dynamo České Budějovice signed Jánošík on a three-year contract, starting from the beginning of the 2020–21 season. After playing 13 matches and scoring twice during the 2020–21 Czech First League, he was released by České Budějovice.

=== Return to Slovakia ===
Jánošík rejoined Žilina in September 2021, after spending the early part of the season training with the club's B-team. In June 2022 Jánošík again left Žilina, signing a two-year deal with Zemplín Michalovce after being lured into the club by the manager Norbert Hrnčár.

== Honours ==
MŠK Žilina

- Fortuna Liga: 2016-17

Individual

- Slovak Super Liga Goal of the Month: February 2020, March 2020
