= Konská =

Konská may refer to:

- Konská, Czech Republic, village in Frýdek-Místek District, Czech Republic
- Konská, Liptovský Mikuláš District, village in Liptovský Mikuláš District, Slovakia
- Konská, Žilina District, village in Žilina District, Slovakia
