= Bitarová =

Village and municipality in Slovakia

- Municipality
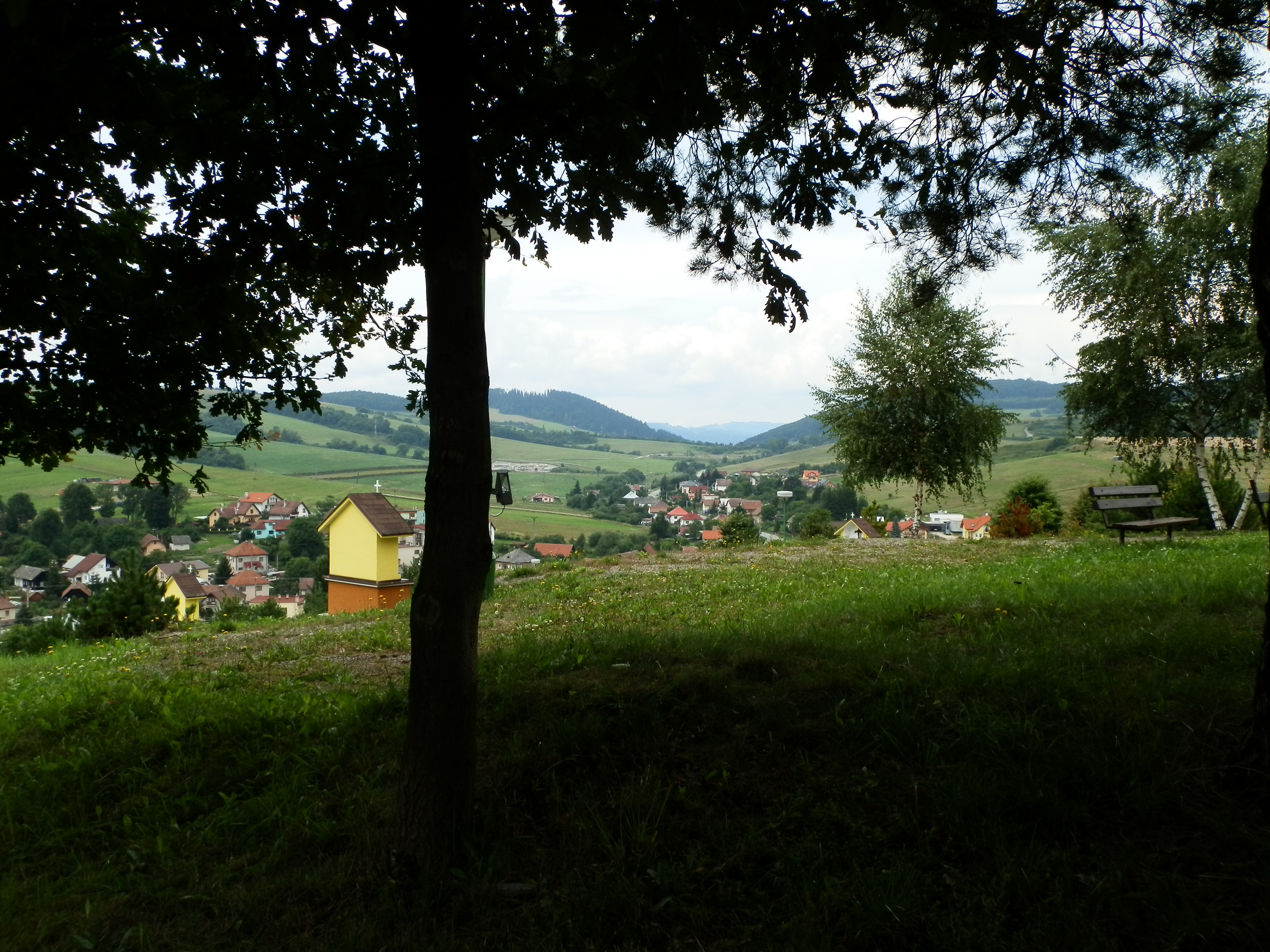

- Flag Coat of arms

- Location of Bitarová in the Žilina Region Location of Bitarová in Slovakia
- Coordinates: 49.22°N 18.67°E
- Country: Slovakia
- Region: Žilina Region
- District: Žilina District
- First mentioned: 1393

Government
  - Mayor: Juraj Drdák (Ind.)

Area
  - Total: 3.64 km^{2} (1.41 sq mi)
- Elevation: 380 m (1,250 ft)

Population (2025)
  - Total: 917
- Time zone: UTC+1 (CET)
  - Summer (DST): UTC+2 (CEST)
- Postal code: 100 4
- Area code: +421 41
- Vehicle registration plate (until 2022): ZA
- Website: www.obecbitarova.sk

Bitarová (Hungarian: Bitérfalva) is a village and municipality in Žilina District in the Žilina Region of northern Slovakia.

== History ==
In historical records the village was first mentioned in 1393.

== Geography ==
The municipality lies at an altitude of 380 metres (1,250 ft) and covers an area of 3.64 km^{2} (1.41 sq mi) (2025).

== Population ==
Population statistic (10 years)
Year	1995	2005	2015	2025
Count	553	626	744	917
Difference		+13.20%	+18.84%	+23.25%

Population statistic
Year	2024	2025
Count	907	917
Difference		+1.10%

It has a population of 917 people (31 December 2025).

=== Ethnicity ===
Census 2021 (1+ %)
Ethnicity	Number	Fraction
Slovak	792	98.01%
Not found out	13	1.6%
Total	808	

In year 2021 was 808 people by ethnicity 792 as Slovak, 13 as Not found out, 6 as Czech, 1 as Russian, 1 as Hungarian, 1 as Other and 1 as English.

Note on population: The difference values of population numbers in the table "Population statistic" and in the sections "Ethnicity" & "Religion" is caused by the use of various statistical methods.

=== Religion ===
Census 2021 (1+ %)
Religion	Number	Fraction
Roman Catholic Church	680	84.16%
None	92	11.39%
Not found out	13	1.61%
Total	808	

In year 2021 was 808 people by religion 680 from Roman Catholic Church, 92 from None, 13 from Not found out, 6 from Greek Catholic Church, 6 from Ad hoc movements, 5 from Evangelical Church, 4 from Baptists Church, 1 from Paganism and natural spirituality and 1 from Christian Congregations in Slovakia.

== Genealogical resources ==
The records for genealogical research are available at the state archive "Statny Archiv in Bytca, Slovakia"

- Roman Catholic church records (births/marriages/deaths): 1725-1925 (parish B)

== See also ==
- List of municipalities and towns in Slovakia
