= Lietavská Svinná-Babkov =

- Municipality
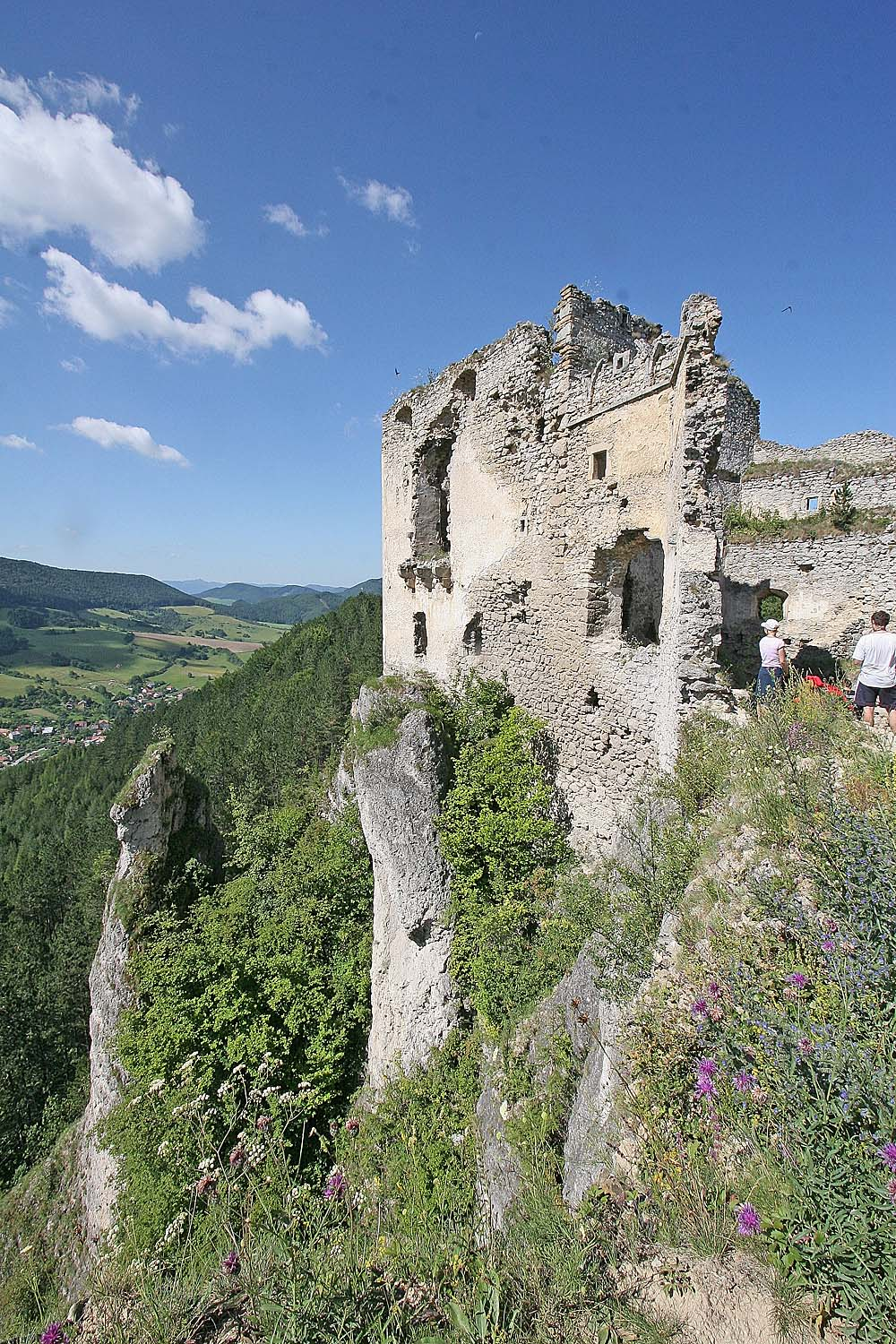
- Lietava Castle above the village

- Flag

- Location of Lietavská Svinná-Babkov in the Žilina Region Location of Lietavská Svinná-Babkov in Slovakia
- Coordinates: 49.16°N 18.68°E
- Country: Slovakia
- Region: Žilina Region
- District: Žilina District
- First mentioned: 1393

Area
  - Total: 18.29 km^{2} (7.06 sq mi)
- Elevation: 448 m (1,470 ft)

Population (2025)
  - Total: 1,727
- Time zone: UTC+1 (CET)
  - Summer (DST): UTC+2 (CEST)
- Postal code: 131 1
- Area code: +421 41
- Vehicle registration plate (until 2022): ZA
- Website: www.obeclietsvinnababkov.info

Lietavská Svinná-Babkov (Hungarian: Litvaszinye-Babkó) is a village and municipality in Žilina District in the Žilina Region of northern Slovakia.

== History ==
In historical records the village was first mentioned in 1393.

== Geography ==
The municipality lies at an altitude of 448 metres (1,470 ft) and covers an area of 18.29 km^{2} (7.06 sq mi) (2025).

== Population ==
Population statistic (10 years)
Year	1995	2005	2015	2025
Count	1514	1589	1722	1727
Difference		+4.95%	+8.37%	+0.29%

Population statistic
Year	2024	2025
Count	1725	1727
Difference		+0.11%

It has a population of 1727 people (31 December 2025).

=== Ethnicity ===
Census 2021 (1+ %)
Ethnicity	Number	Fraction
Slovak	1626	95.53%
Not found out	76	4.46%
Total	1702	

In year 2021 was 1702 people by ethnicity 1626 as Slovak, 76 as Not found out, 8 as Czech, 6 as Other, 3 as Bulgarian, 2 as Italian, 2 as Rusyn, 1 as Vietnamese, 1 as Polish and 1 as Moravian.

Note on population: The difference values of population numbers in the table "Population statistic" and in the sections "Ethnicity" & "Religion" is caused by the use of various statistical methods.

=== Religion ===
Census 2021 (1+ %)
Religion	Number	Fraction
Roman Catholic Church	1362	80.02%
None	223	13.1%
Not found out	73	4.29%
Total	1702	

In year 2021 was 1702 people by religion 1362 from Roman Catholic Church, 223 from None, 73 from Not found out, 10 from Christian Congregations in Slovakia, 10 from Evangelical Church, 9 from Greek Catholic Church, 5 from Eastern Orthodox Church, 3 from Ad hoc movements, 2 from Calvinist Church, 2 from Buddhism, 1 from Other and not ascertained christian church, 1 from Other and 1 from Baptists Church.

== Cultural heritage ==
The village houses a significant Renaissance bell from 1606, believed to originate from Lietava Castle. Commissioned by Palatine Juraj Thurzo, the bell features a Latin inscription and the Thurzo family coat of arms. As of 2023, it remains functional and is still manually rung in the village belfry.
