= Zbyňov =

Village in the Žilina Region of Slovakia

- Municipality
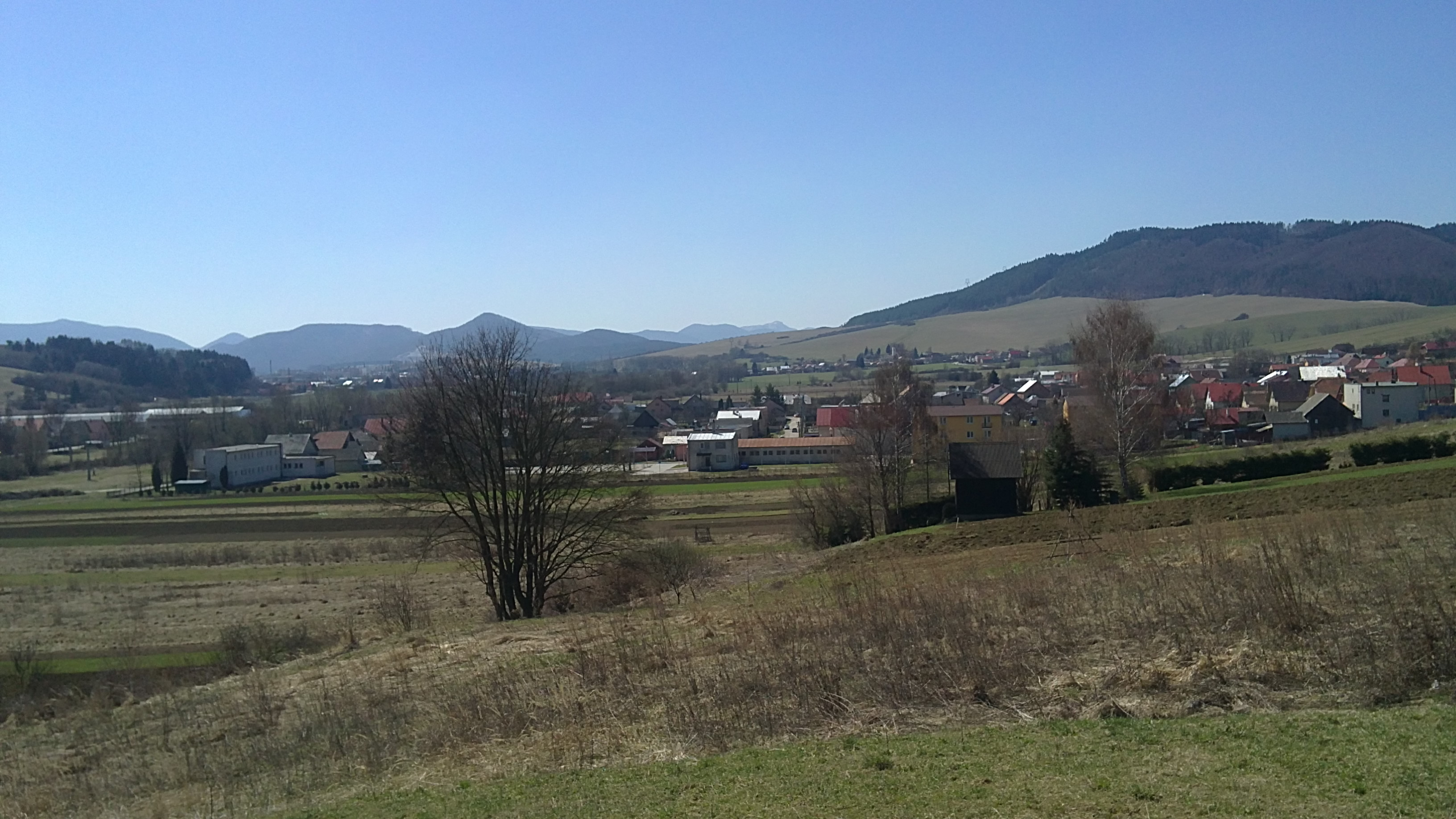

- Flag

- Location of Zbyňov in the Žilina Region Location of Zbyňov in Slovakia
- Coordinates: 49.12°N 18.65°E
- Country: Slovakia
- Region: Žilina Region
- District: Žilina District
- First mentioned: 1407

Area
  - Total: 7.04 km^{2} (2.72 sq mi)
- Elevation: 427 m (1,401 ft)

Population (2025)
  - Total: 902
- Time zone: UTC+1 (CET)
  - Summer (DST): UTC+2 (CEST)
- Postal code: 131 9
- Area code: +421 41
- Vehicle registration plate (until 2022): ZA
- Website: www.obeczbynov.sk

Zbyňov (Hungarian: Zebény) is a village and municipality in Žilina District in the Žilina Region of northern Slovakia.

== History ==
In historical records the village was first mentioned in 1407.

== Geography ==
The municipality lies at an altitude of 427 metres (1,401 ft) and covers an area of 7.04 km^{2} (2.72 sq mi) (2025).

== Population ==
Population statistic (10 years)
Year	1995	2005	2015	2025
Count	828	852	844	902
Difference		+2.89%	−0.93%	+6.87%

Population statistic
Year	2024	2025
Count	899	902
Difference		+0.33%

It has a population of 902 people (31 December 2025).

=== Ethnicity ===
Census 2021 (1+ %)
Ethnicity	Number	Fraction
Slovak	867	98.41%
Not found out	16	1.81%
Total	881	

In year 2021 was 881 people by ethnicity 867 as Slovak, 16 as Not found out, 7 as Other, 3 as Russian, 2 as Czech and 2 as Austrian.

Note on population: The difference values of population numbers in the table "Population statistic" and in the sections "Ethnicity" & "Religion" is caused by the use of various statistical methods.

=== Religion ===
Census 2021 (1+ %)
Religion	Number	Fraction
Roman Catholic Church	730	82.86%
None	113	12.83%
Not found out	14	1.59%
Total	881	

In year 2021 was 881 people by religion 730 from Roman Catholic Church, 113 from None, 14 from Not found out, 5 from Christian Congregations in Slovakia, 4 from Greek Catholic Church, 4 from Ad hoc movements, 3 from Paganism and natural spirituality, 2 from Calvinist Church, 2 from Buddhism, 1 from Other and not ascertained christian church, 1 from Jehovah's Witnesses, 1 from Hinduism and 1 from Evangelical Church.
