= Stráža =

Village and municipality in Slovakia

- Municipality
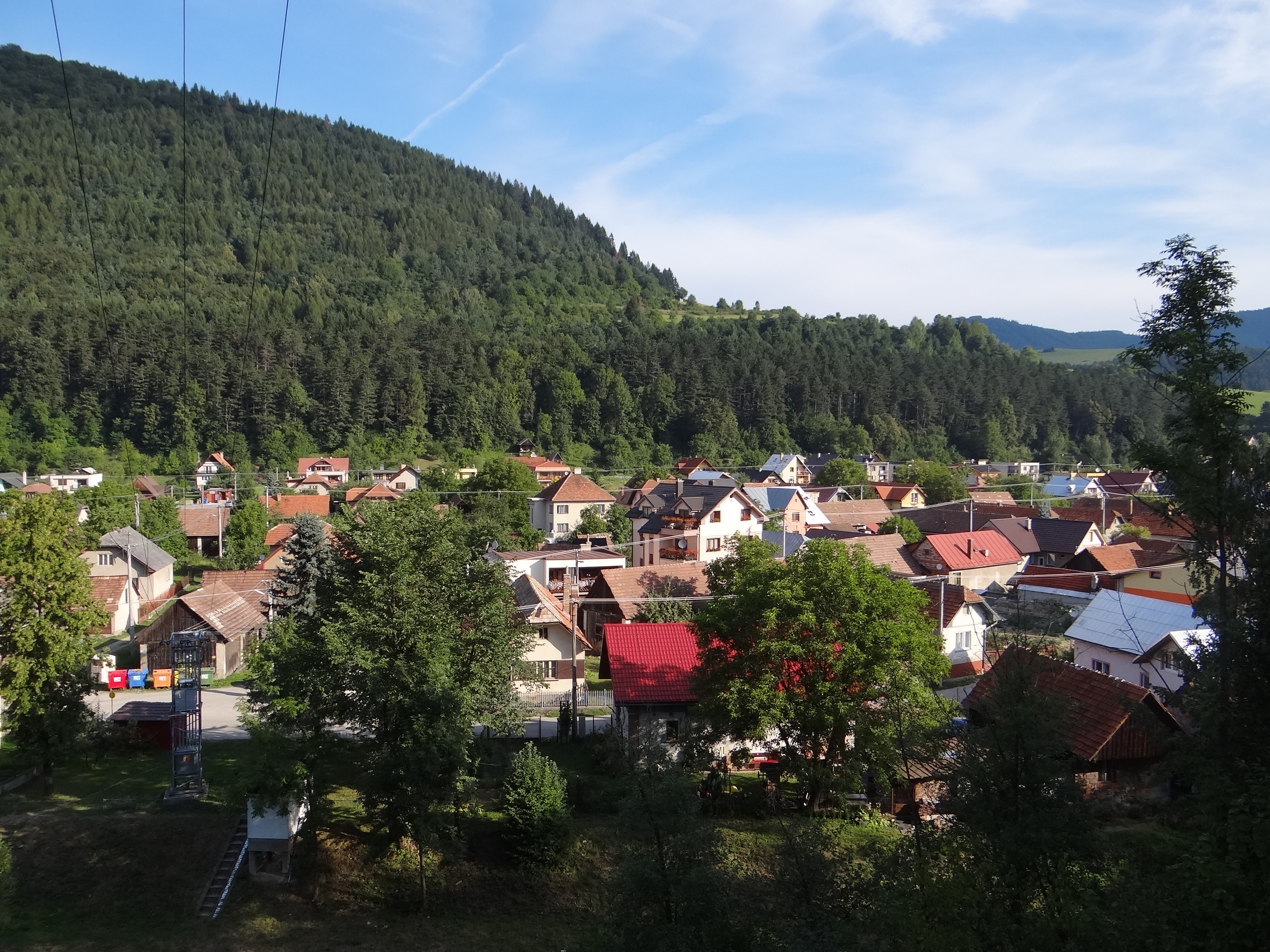

- Flag

- Location of Stráža in the Žilina Region Location of Stráža in Slovakia
- Coordinates: 49.23°N 18.91°E
- Country: Slovakia
- Region: Žilina Region
- District: Žilina District
- First mentioned: 1439

Area
  - Total: 3.17 km^{2} (1.22 sq mi)
- Elevation: 402 m (1,319 ft)

Population (2025)
  - Total: 691
- Time zone: UTC+1 (CET)
  - Summer (DST): UTC+2 (CEST)
- Postal code: 130 4
- Area code: +421 41
- Vehicle registration plate (until 2022): ZA
- Website: obecstraza.sk

Stráža (Hungarian: Nemesőr) is a village and municipality in Žilina District in the Žilina Region of northern Slovakia.

== History ==
In historical records the village was first mentioned in 1439.

== Geography ==
The municipality lies at an altitude of 402 metres (1,319 ft) and covers an area of 3.17 km^{2} (1.22 sq mi) (2025).

== Population ==
Population statistic (10 years)
Year	1995	2005	2015	2025
Count	637	669	674	691
Difference		+5.02%	+0.74%	+2.52%

Population statistic
Year	2024	2025
Count	686	691
Difference		+0.72%

It has a population of 691 people (31 December 2025).

=== Ethnicity ===
Census 2021 (1+ %)
Ethnicity	Number	Fraction
Slovak	664	98.66%
Not found out	8	1.18%
Total	673	

In year 2021 was 673 people by ethnicity 664 as Slovak, 8 as Not found out, 5 as Canadian and 3 as Czech.

Note on population: The difference values of population numbers in the table "Population statistic" and in the sections "Ethnicity" & "Religion" is caused by the use of various statistical methods.

=== Religion ===
Census 2021 (1+ %)
Religion	Number	Fraction
Roman Catholic Church	619	91.98%
None	40	5.94%
Total	673	

In year 2021 was 673 people by religion 619 from Roman Catholic Church, 40 from None, 5 from Not found out, 4 from Evangelical Church, 1 from Paganism and natural spirituality, 1 from Christian Congregations in Slovakia, 1 from Other, 1 from Greek Catholic Church and 1 from Buddhism.
