= Lutiše =

Village and municipality in Slovakia

- Municipality
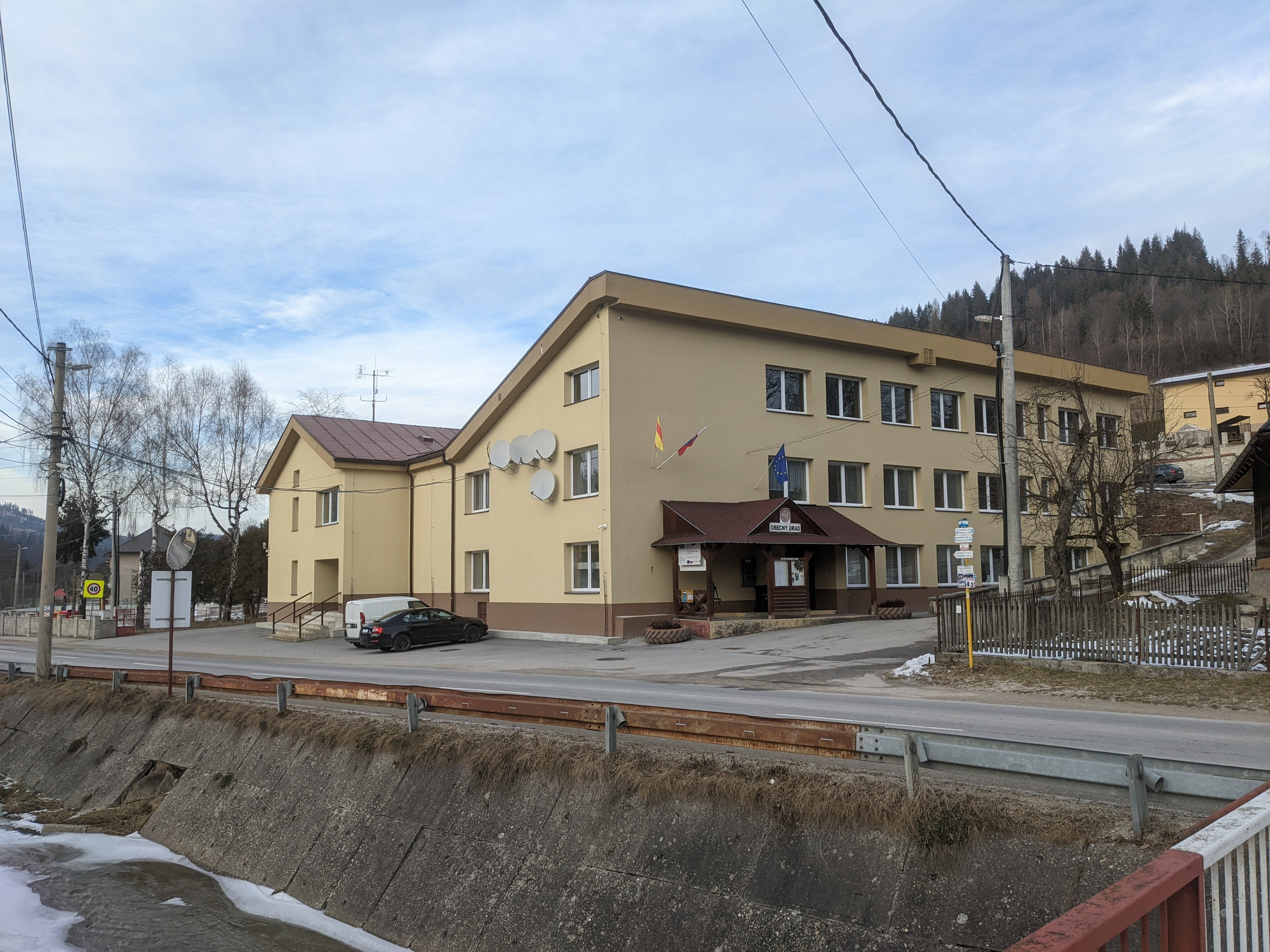

- Flag

- Location of Lutiše in the Žilina Region Location of Lutiše in Slovakia
- Coordinates: 49.30°N 18.97°E
- Country: Slovakia
- Region: Žilina Region
- District: Žilina District
- First mentioned: 1662

Area
  - Total: 20.08 km^{2} (7.75 sq mi)
- Elevation: 568 m (1,864 ft)

Population (2025)
  - Total: 748
- Time zone: UTC+1 (CET)
  - Summer (DST): UTC+2 (CEST)
- Postal code: 230 4
- Area code: +421 41
- Vehicle registration plate (until 2022): ZA
- Website: lutise.sk

Lutiše (Hungarian: Lótos) is a village and municipality in Žilina District in the Žilina Region of northern Slovakia.

== History ==
In historical records the village was first mentioned in 1662.

== Geography ==
The municipality lies at an altitude of 568 metres (1,864 ft) and covers an area of 20.08 km^{2} (7.75 sq mi) (2025).

== Population ==
Population statistic (10 years)
Year	1995	2005	2015	2025
Count	849	807	728	748
Difference		−4.94%	−9.78%	+2.74%

Population statistic
Year	2024	2025
Count	758	748
Difference		−1.31%

It has a population of 748 people (31 December 2025).

=== Ethnicity ===
Census 2021 (1+ %)
Ethnicity	Number	Fraction
Slovak	753	98.94%
Total	761	

In year 2021 was 761 people by ethnicity 753 as Slovak, 6 as Not found out, 2 as Czech, 2 as Italian, 1 as Russian and 1 as Hungarian.

Note on population: The difference values of population numbers in the table "Population statistic" and in the sections "Ethnicity" & "Religion" is caused by the use of various statistical methods.

=== Religion ===
Census 2021 (1+ %)
Religion	Number	Fraction
Roman Catholic Church	705	92.64%
None	41	5.39%
Total	761	

In year 2021 was 761 people by religion 705 from Roman Catholic Church, 41 from None, 5 from Not found out, 5 from Greek Catholic Church, 3 from Other, 1 from Jewish community and 1 from Jehovah's Witnesses.
