= Kotrčiná Lúčka =

Village and municipality in Slovakia

- Municipality
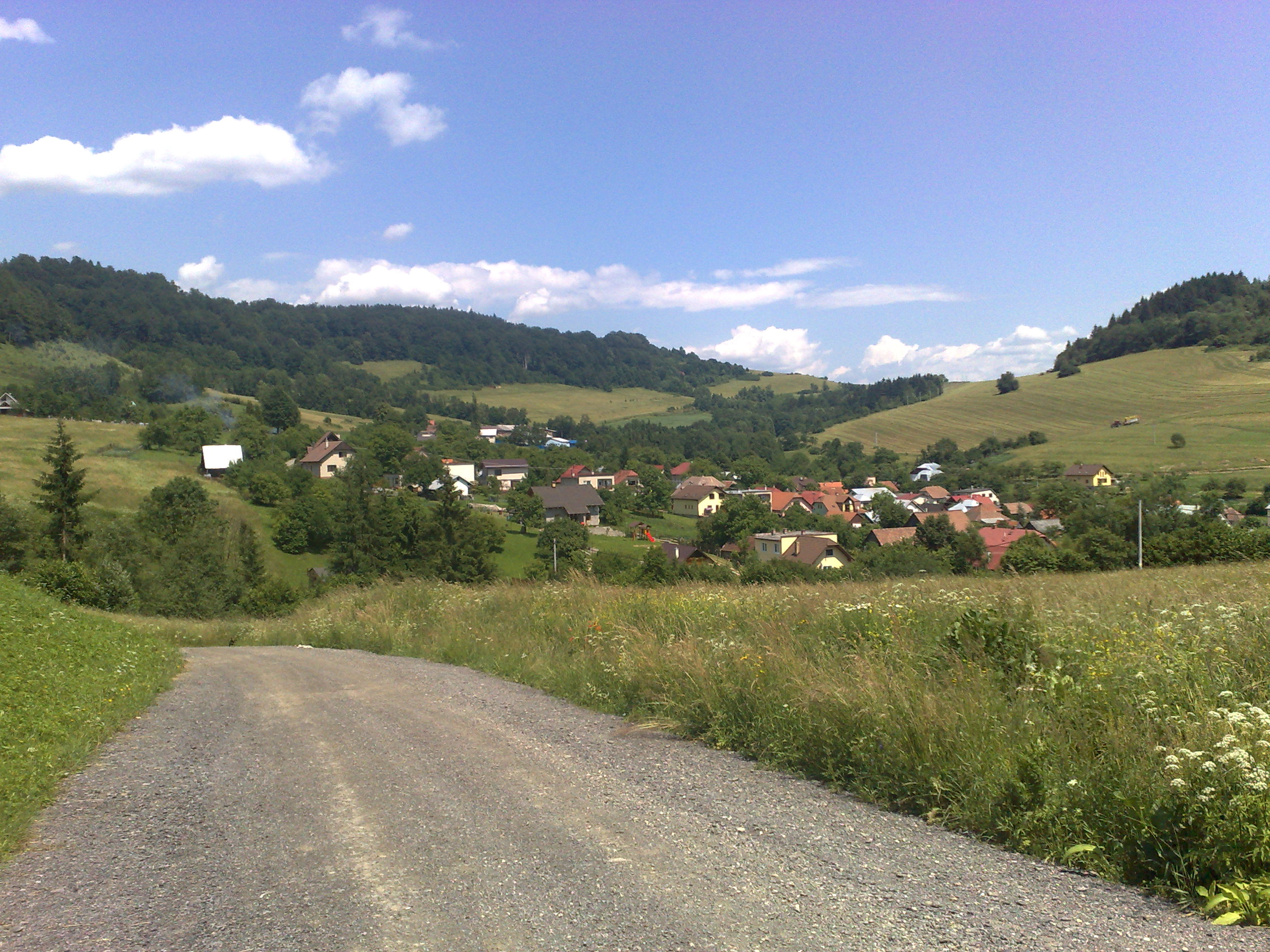

- Flag

- Location of Kotrčiná Lúčka in the Žilina Region Location of Kotrčiná Lúčka in Slovakia
- Coordinates: 49.25°N 18.83°E
- Country: Slovakia
- Region: Žilina Region
- District: Žilina District
- First mentioned: 1439

Area
  - Total: 4.14 km^{2} (1.60 sq mi)
- Elevation: 464 m (1,522 ft)

Population (2025)
  - Total: 698
- Time zone: UTC+1 (CET)
  - Summer (DST): UTC+2 (CEST)
- Postal code: 130 2
- Area code: +421 41
- Vehicle registration plate (until 2022): ZA
- Website: kotrcinalucka.sk

Kotrčiná Lúčka (Hungarian: Kaszásrét) is a village and municipality in Žilina District in the Žilina Region of northern Slovakia.

== History ==
In historical records the village was first mentioned in 1439.

== Geography ==
The municipality lies at an altitude of 464 metres (1,522 ft) and covers an area of 4.14 km^{2} (1.60 sq mi) (2025).

== Population ==
Population statistic (10 years)
Year	1995	2005	2015	2025
Count	383	420	465	698
Difference		+9.66%	+10.71%	+50.10%

Population statistic
Year	2024	2025
Count	695	698
Difference		+0.43%

It has a population of 698 people (31 December 2025).

=== Ethnicity ===
Census 2021 (1+ %)
Ethnicity	Number	Fraction
Slovak	566	99.64%
Not found out	6	1.05%
Total	568	

In year 2021 was 568 people by ethnicity 566 as Slovak, 6 as Not found out, 2 as Czech, 1 as Russian and 1 as Other.

Note on population: The difference values of population numbers in the table "Population statistic" and in the sections "Ethnicity" & "Religion" is caused by the use of various statistical methods.

=== Religion ===
Census 2021 (1+ %)
Religion	Number	Fraction
Roman Catholic Church	431	75.88%
None	93	16.37%
Evangelical Church	19	3.35%
Christian Congregations in Slovakia	13	2.29%
Total	568	

In year 2021 was 568 people by religion 431 from Roman Catholic Church, 93 from None, 19 from Evangelical Church, 13 from Christian Congregations in Slovakia, 4 from Greek Catholic Church, 3 from Not found out, 2 from Other, 1 from Calvinist Church, 1 from Paganism and natural spirituality and 1 from Buddhism.

== Genealogical resources ==
The records for genealogical research are available at the state archive "Statny Archiv in Bytca, Slovakia"

- Roman Catholic church records (births/marriages/deaths): 1789-1900 (parish B)

== See also ==
- List of municipalities and towns in Slovakia
