= Veľká Čierna =

- Municipality
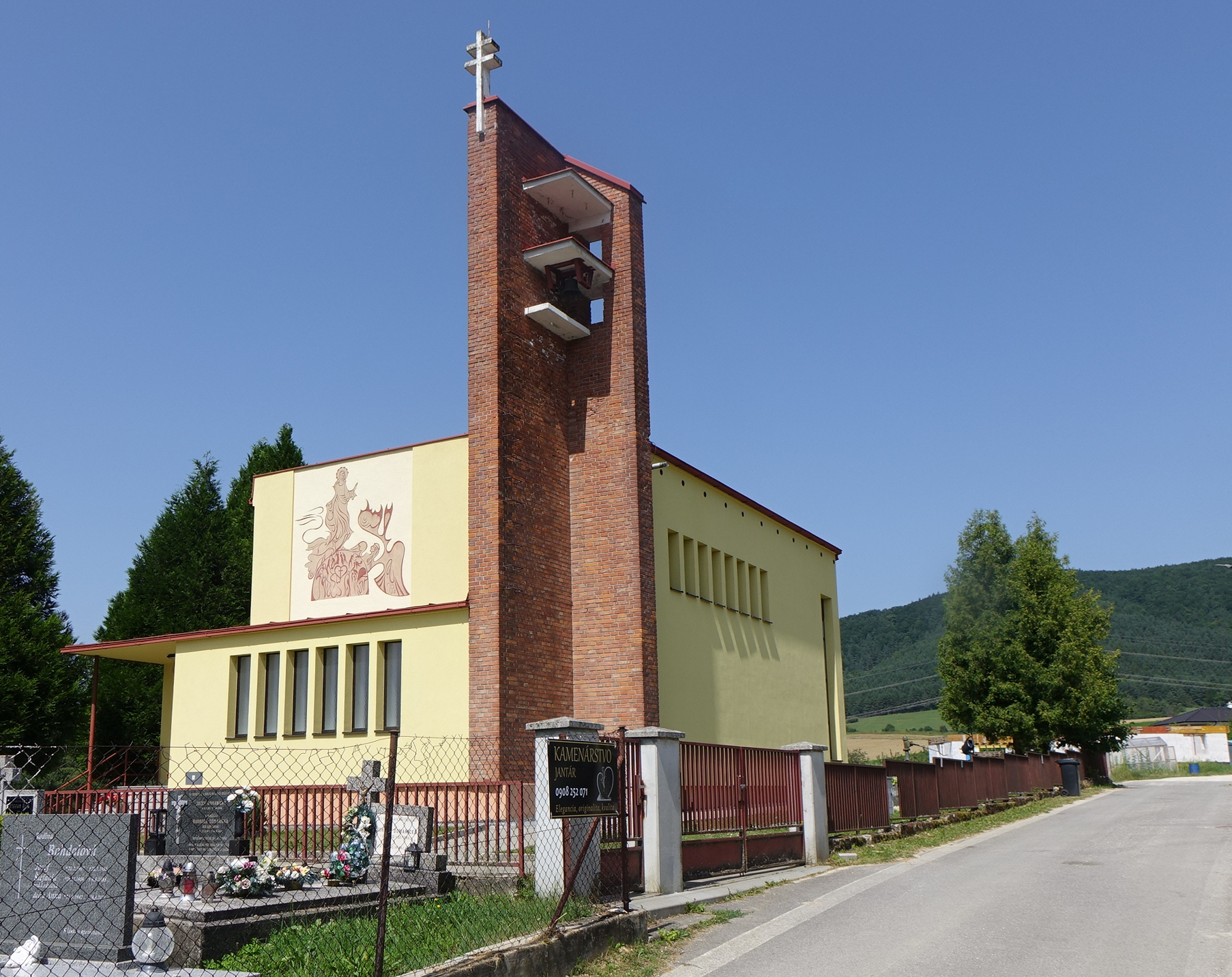

- Flag

- Location of Veľká Čierna in the Žilina Region Location of Veľká Čierna in Slovakia
- Coordinates: 49.08°N 18.58°E
- Country: Slovakia
- Region: Žilina Region
- District: Žilina District
- First mentioned: 1361

Area
  - Total: 4.82 km^{2} (1.86 sq mi)
- Elevation: 495 m (1,624 ft)

Population (2025)
  - Total: 375
- Time zone: UTC+1 (CET)
  - Summer (DST): UTC+2 (CEST)
- Postal code: 150 1
- Area code: +421 41
- Vehicle registration plate (until 2022): ZA
- Website: www.obecvelkacierna.info

Veľká Čierna (Hungarian: Nagycserna) is a village and municipality in Žilina District in the Žilina Region of northern Slovakia.

== History ==
In historical records the village was first mentioned in 1361.

== Geography ==
The municipality lies at an altitude of 495 metres (1,624 ft) and covers an area of 4.82 km^{2} (1.86 sq mi) (2025).

== Population ==
Population statistic (10 years)
Year	1995	2005	2015	2025
Count	359	362	354	375
Difference		+0.83%	−2.20%	+5.93%

Population statistic
Year	2024	2025
Count	370	375
Difference		+1.35%

It has a population of 375 people (31 December 2025).

=== Ethnicity ===
Census 2021 (1+ %)
Ethnicity	Number	Fraction
Slovak	357	97.8%
Czech	5	1.36%
Not found out	5	1.36%
Other	4	1.09%
Total	365	

In year 2021 was 365 people by ethnicity 357 as Slovak, 5 as Czech, 5 as Not found out, 4 as Other, 2 as Polish, 1 as Russian, 1 as Moravian and 1 as Hungarian.

Note on population: The difference values of population numbers in the table "Population statistic" and in the sections "Ethnicity" & "Religion" is caused by the use of various statistical methods.

=== Religion ===
Census 2021 (1+ %)
Religion	Number	Fraction
Roman Catholic Church	336	92.05%
None	16	4.38%
Not found out	8	2.19%
Total	365	

In year 2021 was 365 people by religion 336 from Roman Catholic Church, 16 from None, 8 from Not found out, 3 from Greek Catholic Church, 1 from Evangelical Church and 1 from Buddhism.
