= Brežany, Žilina District =

Brežany
- Municipality
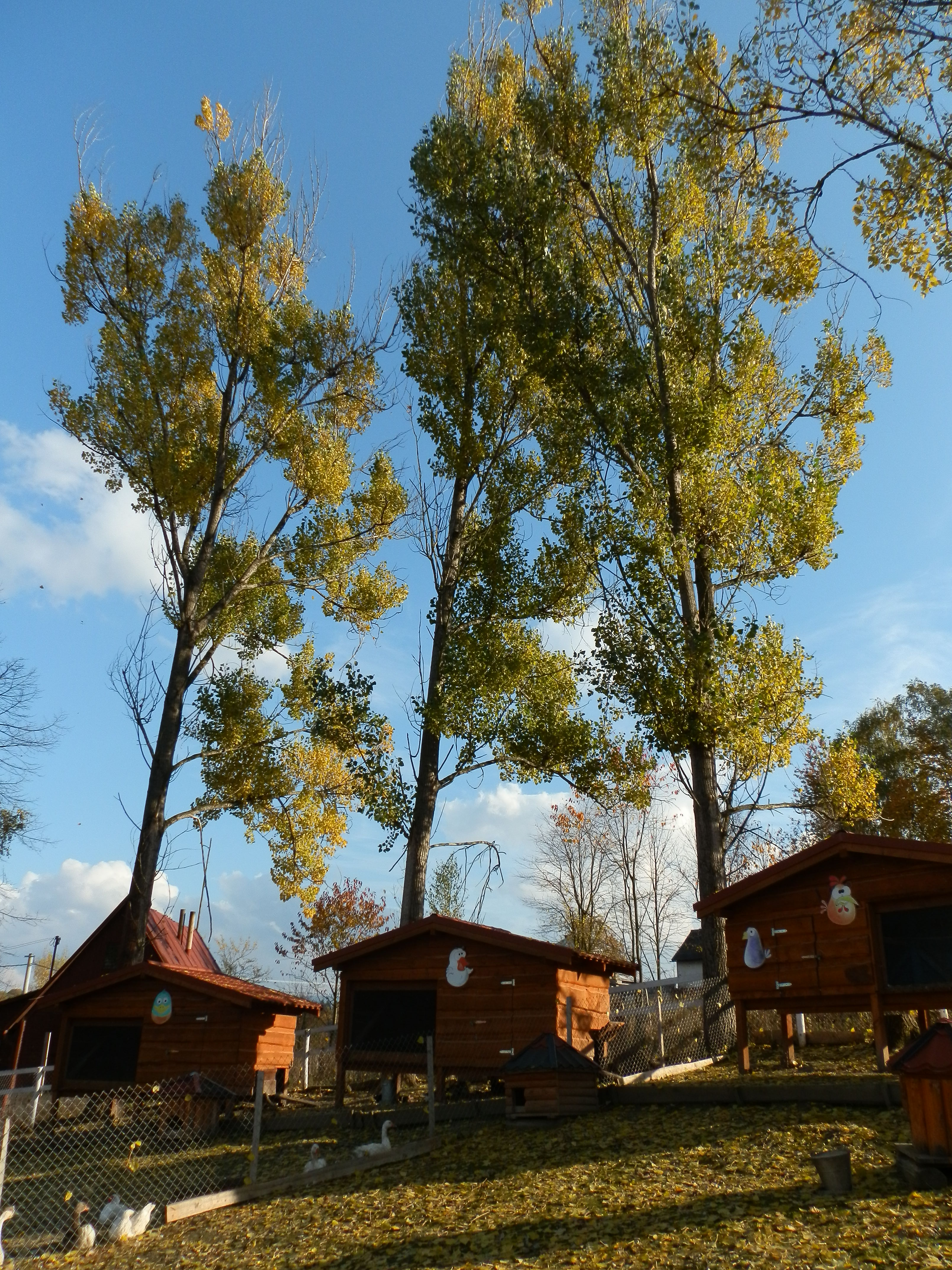

- Flag Coat of arms

- Location of Brežany in the Žilina Region Location of Brežany in Slovakia
- Coordinates: 48°58′40″N 21°06′30″E
- Country: Slovakia
- Region: Žilina Region
- District: Žilina District
- First mentioned: 1393

Area
  - Total: 3.65 km^{2} (1.41 sq mi)
- Elevation: 381 m (1,250 ft)

Population (2025)
  - Total: 681
- Time zone: UTC+1 (CET)
  - Summer (DST): UTC+2 (CEST)
- Postal code: 100 4
- Area code: +421 41
- Vehicle registration plate (until 2022): ZA
- Website: www.obecbrezany.sk

Brezany (Hungarian: Sárosbuják) is a village and municipality in Žilina District in the Žilina Region of northern Slovakia.

== History ==
In historical records the village was first mentioned in 1393.

The records for genealogical research are available at the state archive "Statny Archiv in Bytca, Slovakia"

- Roman Catholic church records (births/marriages/deaths): 1725-1925 (parish B)

== Geography ==
The municipality lies at an altitude of 381 metres (1,250 ft) and covers an area of 3.65 km^{2} (1.41 sq mi) (2025).

== Population ==
Population statistic (10 years)
Year	1995	2005	2015	2025
Count	480	451	619	681
Difference		−6.04%	+37.25%	+10.01%

Population statistic
Year	2024	2025
Count	692	681
Difference		−1.58%

It has a population of 681 people (31 December 2025).

=== Ethnicity ===
Census 2021 (1+ %)
Ethnicity	Number	Fraction
Slovak	649	98.78%
Total	657	

In year 2021 was 657 people by ethnicity 649 as Slovak, 4 as Not found out, 3 as Czech, 2 as German, 1 as Vietnamese, 1 as Romani, 1 as Hungarian and 1 as Greek.

Note on population: The difference values of population numbers in the table "Population statistic" and in the sections "Ethnicity" & "Religion" is caused by the use of various statistical methods.

=== Religion ===
Census 2021 (1+ %)
Religion	Number	Fraction
Roman Catholic Church	529	80.52%
None	109	16.59%
Total	657	

In year 2021 was 657 people by religion 529 from Roman Catholic Church, 109 from None, 5 from Evangelical Church, 4 from Other and not ascertained christian church, 3 from Ad hoc movements, 2 from Christian Congregations in Slovakia, 1 from Not found out, 1 from Islam, 1 from Other, 1 from Greek Catholic Church and 1 from Buddhism.

== See also ==
- List of municipalities and towns in Slovakia
