= Paština Závada =

Village and municipality in Slovakia

- Municipality
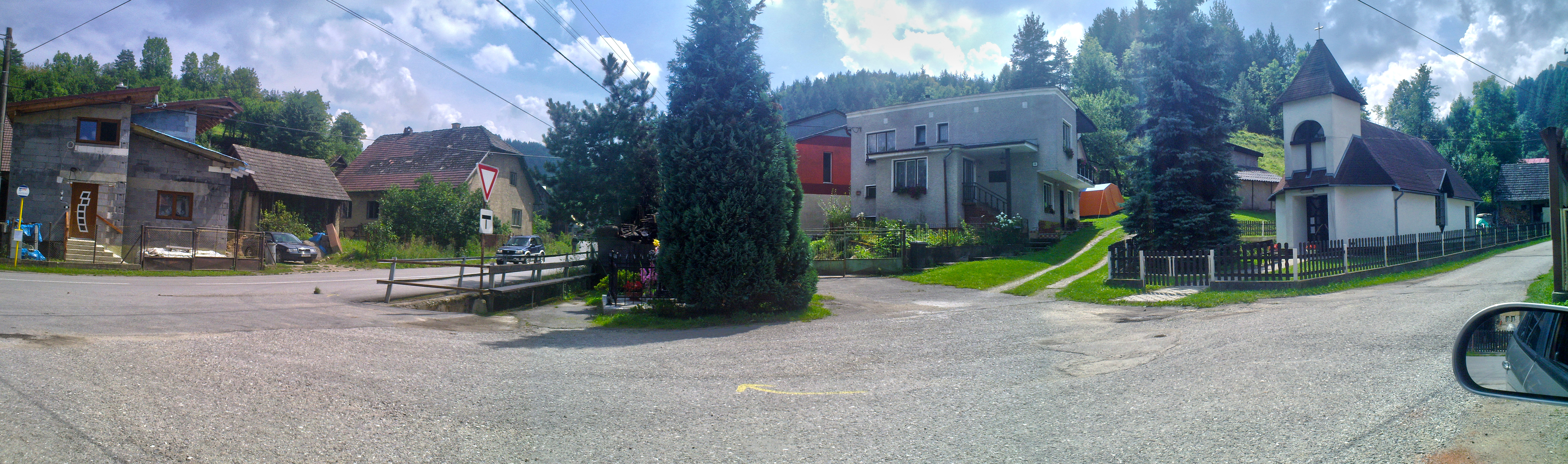

- Flag

- Location of Paština Závada in the Žilina Region Location of Paština Závada in Slovakia
- Coordinates: 49.22°N 18.63°E
- Country: Slovakia
- Region: Žilina Region
- District: Žilina District
- First mentioned: 1402

Area
  - Total: 7.32 km^{2} (2.83 sq mi)
- Elevation: 360 m (1,180 ft)

Population (2025)
  - Total: 265
- Time zone: UTC+1 (CET)
  - Summer (DST): UTC+2 (CEST)
- Postal code: 134 1
- Area code: +421 41
- Vehicle registration plate (until 2022): ZA
- Website: pastinazavada.sk

Paština Závada (Hungarian: Pásztorzávod) is a village and municipality in Žilina District in the Žilina Region of northern Slovakia.

== History ==
In historical records the village was first mentioned in 1402.

== Geography ==
The municipality lies at an altitude of 360 metres (1,180 ft) and covers an area of 7.32 km^{2} (2.83 sq mi) (2025).

== Population ==
Population statistic (10 years)
Year	1995	2005	2015	2025
Count	220	260	233	265
Difference		+18.18%	−10.38%	+13.73%

Population statistic
Year	2024	2025
Count	260	265
Difference		+1.92%

It has a population of 265 people (31 December 2025).

=== Ethnicity ===
Census 2021 (1+ %)
Ethnicity	Number	Fraction
Slovak	238	97.54%
Not found out	6	2.45%
Total	244	

In year 2021 was 244 people by ethnicity 238 as Slovak and 6 as Not found out.

Note on population: The difference values of population numbers in the table "Population statistic" and in the sections "Ethnicity" & "Religion" is caused by the use of various statistical methods.

=== Religion ===
Census 2021 (1+ %)
Religion	Number	Fraction
Roman Catholic Church	214	87.7%
None	14	5.74%
Not found out	7	2.87%
Calvinist Church	4	1.64%
Total	244	

In year 2021 was 244 people by religion 214 from Roman Catholic Church, 14 from None, 7 from Not found out, 4 from Calvinist Church, 2 from Ad hoc movements, 1 from Other and not ascertained christian church, 1 from United Methodist Church and 1 from Evangelical Church.
