= Stránske =

- Municipality
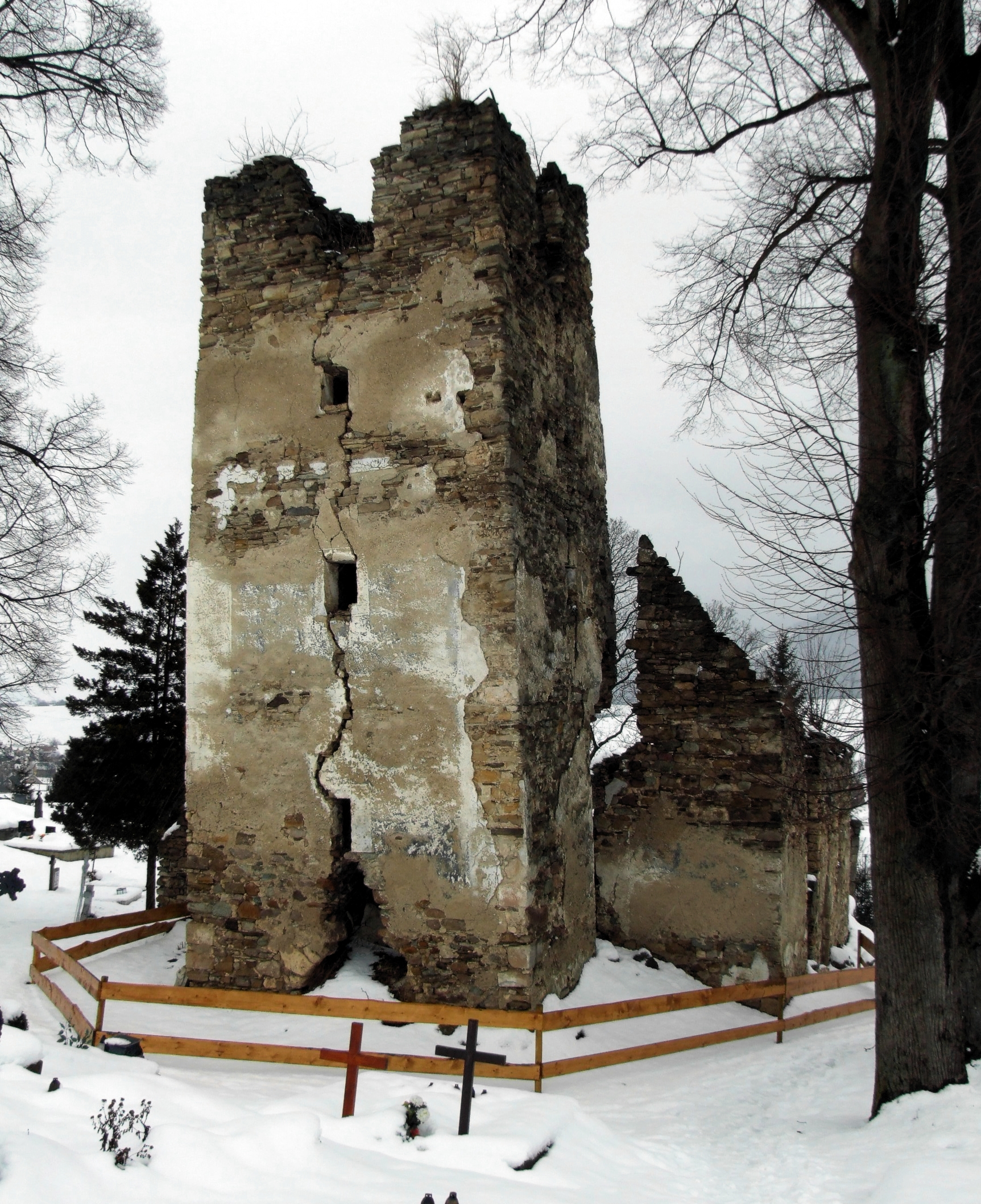

- Flag

- Location of Stránske in the Žilina Region Location of Stránske in Slovakia
- Coordinates: 49.12°N 18.70°E
- Country: Slovakia
- Region: Žilina Region
- District: Žilina District
- First mentioned: 1368

Area
  - Total: 18.75 km^{2} (7.24 sq mi)
- Elevation: 431 m (1,414 ft)

Population (2025)
  - Total: 947
- Time zone: UTC+1 (CET)
  - Summer (DST): UTC+2 (CEST)
- Postal code: 131 3
- Area code: +421 41
- Vehicle registration plate (until 2022): ZA
- Website: www.stranske.sk

Stránske (Hungarian: Alsóosztorány) is a village and municipality in Žilina District in the Žilina Region of northern Slovakia.

== History ==
In historical records the village was first mentioned in 1368.

== Geography ==
The municipality lies at an altitude of 431 metres (1,414 ft) and covers an area of 18.75 km^{2} (7.24 sq mi) (2025).

== Population ==
Population statistic (10 years)
Year	1995	2005	2015	2025
Count	691	696	796	947
Difference		+0.72%	+14.36%	+18.96%

Population statistic
Year	2024	2025
Count	950	947
Difference		−0.31%

It has a population of 947 people (31 December 2025).

=== Ethnicity ===
Census 2021 (1+ %)
Ethnicity	Number	Fraction
Slovak	868	97.63%
Other	18	2.02%
Not found out	17	1.91%
Total	889	

In year 2021 was 889 people by ethnicity 868 as Slovak, 18 as Other, 17 as Not found out, 3 as Czech, 2 as Hungarian, 1 as German and 1 as French.

Note on population: The difference values of population numbers in the table "Population statistic" and in the sections "Ethnicity" & "Religion" is caused by the use of various statistical methods.

=== Religion ===
Census 2021 (1+ %)
Religion	Number	Fraction
Roman Catholic Church	705	79.3%
None	121	13.61%
Not found out	19	2.14%
Total	889	

In year 2021 was 889 people by religion 705 from Roman Catholic Church, 121 from None, 19 from Not found out, 8 from Evangelical Church, 7 from Other, 6 from Greek Catholic Church, 6 from Ad hoc movements, 4 from Calvinist Church, 4 from Other and not ascertained christian church, 3 from Christian Congregations in Slovakia, 3 from Church of the Brethren, 2 from Buddhism and 1 from Baptists Church.
