= Turie =

Village and municipality in Slovakia

- Municipality
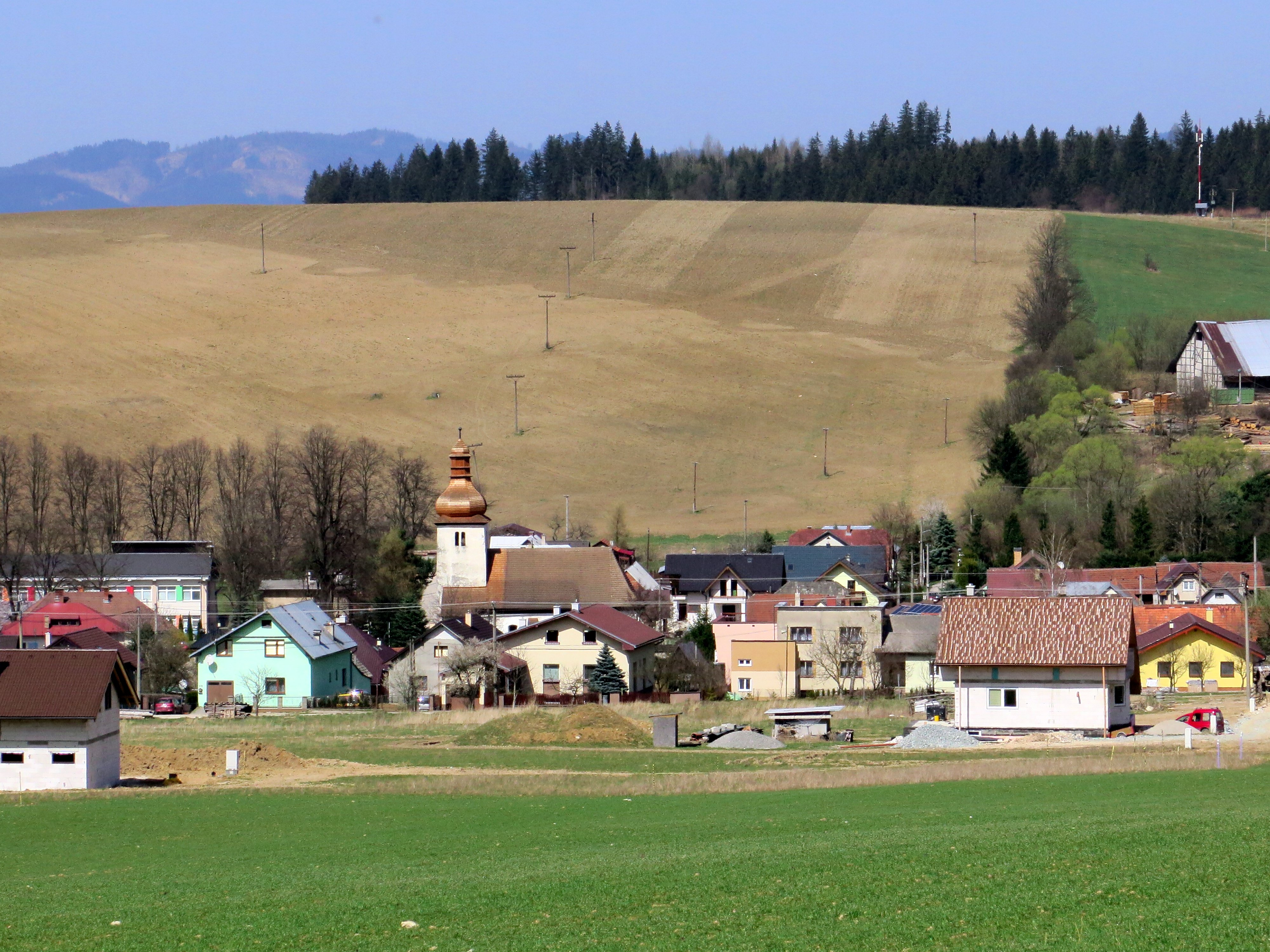

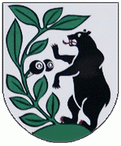
- Flag Coat of arms

- Location of Turie in the Žilina Region Location of Turie in Slovakia
- Coordinates: 49.15°N 18.75°E
- Country: Slovakia
- Region: Žilina Region
- District: Žilina District
- First mentioned: 1386

Area
  - Total: 27.20 km^{2} (10.50 sq mi)
- Elevation: 441 m (1,447 ft)

Population (2025)
  - Total: 2,174
- Time zone: UTC+1 (CET)
  - Summer (DST): UTC+2 (CEST)
- Postal code: 131 2
- Area code: +421 41
- Vehicle registration plate (until 2022): ZA
- Website: www.obecturie.sk

Turie (Hungarian: Háromudvar) is a village and municipality in Žilina District in the Žilina Region of northern Slovakia.

== History ==
In historical records the village was first mentioned in 1386.

== Geography ==
The municipality lies at an altitude of 441 metres (1,447 ft) and covers an area of 27.20 km^{2} (10.50 sq mi) (2025).

== Population ==
Population statistic (10 years)
Year	1995	2005	2015	2025
Count	1815	1991	1973	2174
Difference		+9.69%	−0.90%	+10.18%

Population statistic
Year	2024	2025
Count	2158	2174
Difference		+0.74%

It has a population of 2174 people (31 December 2025).

=== Ethnicity ===
Census 2021 (1+ %)
Ethnicity	Number	Fraction
Slovak	1983	96.73%
Not found out	64	3.12%
Total	2050	

In year 2021 was 2050 people by ethnicity 1983 as Slovak, 64 as Not found out, 17 as Romani, 8 as Other, 6 as Czech, 2 as Rusyn, 2 as German, 2 as Hungarian, 1 as Italian, 1 as Russian and 1 as Croatian.

Note on population: The difference values of population numbers in the table "Population statistic" and in the sections "Ethnicity" & "Religion" is caused by the use of various statistical methods.

=== Religion ===
Census 2021 (1+ %)
Religion	Number	Fraction
Roman Catholic Church	1568	76.49%
None	356	17.37%
Not found out	76	3.71%
Total	2050	

In year 2021 was 2050 people by religion 1568 from Roman Catholic Church, 356 from None, 76 from Not found out, 16 from Evangelical Church, 9 from Ad hoc movements, 5 from Greek Catholic Church, 4 from Paganism and natural spirituality, 4 from Jehovah's Witnesses, 4 from Other, 3 from Seventh-day Adventist Church, 2 from Christian Congregations in Slovakia, 2 from Buddhism and 1 from Calvinist Church.
