= Jasenové =

Village and municipality in Slovakia

- Municipality
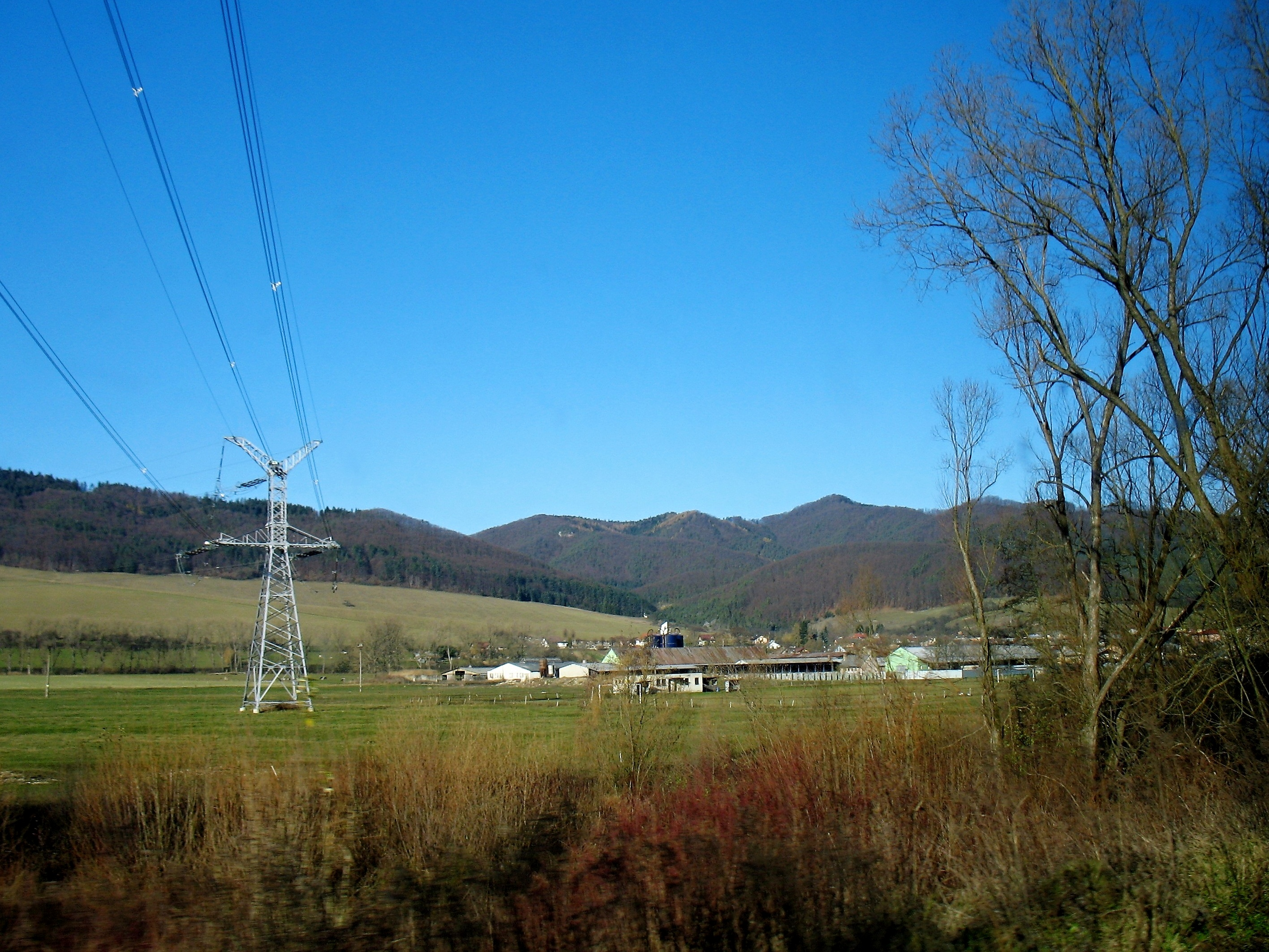

- Flag

- Location of Jasenové in the Žilina Region Location of Jasenové in Slovakia
- Coordinates: 49.12°N 18.63°E
- Country: Slovakia
- Region: Žilina Region
- District: Žilina District
- First mentioned: 1407

Area
  - Total: 6.27 km^{2} (2.42 sq mi)
- Elevation: 441 m (1,447 ft)

Population (2025)
  - Total: 600
- Time zone: UTC+1 (CET)
  - Summer (DST): UTC+2 (CEST)
- Postal code: 131 9
- Area code: +421 41
- Vehicle registration plate (until 2022): ZA
- Website: www.e-obce.info/jasenove/

Jasenové (Hungarian: Jeszenye) is a village and municipality in Žilina District in the Žilina Region of northern Slovakia.

== History ==
In historical records the village was first mentioned in 1407.

== Geography ==
The municipality lies at an altitude of 441 metres (1,447 ft) and covers an area of 6.27 km^{2} (2.42 sq mi) (2025).

== Population ==
Population statistic (10 years)
Year	1995	2005	2015	2025
Count	624	638	617	600
Difference		+2.24%	−3.29%	−2.75%

Population statistic
Year	2024	2025
Count	603	600
Difference		−0.49%

It has a population of 600 people (31 December 2025).

=== Ethnicity ===
Census 2021 (1+ %)
Ethnicity	Number	Fraction
Slovak	594	96.74%
Not found out	21	3.42%
Total	614	

In year 2021 was 614 people by ethnicity 594 as Slovak, 21 as Not found out, 3 as Czech, 2 as Other, 1 as Vietnamese and 1 as Hungarian.

Note on population: The difference values of population numbers in the table "Population statistic" and in the sections "Ethnicity" & "Religion" is caused by the use of various statistical methods.

=== Religion ===
Census 2021 (1+ %)
Religion	Number	Fraction
Roman Catholic Church	510	83.06%
None	69	11.24%
Not found out	20	3.26%
Total	614	

In year 2021 was 614 people by religion 510 from Roman Catholic Church, 69 from None, 20 from Not found out, 6 from Evangelical Church, 3 from Greek Catholic Church, 3 from Ad hoc movements, 1 from Calvinist Church, 1 from Christian Congregations in Slovakia and 1 from Buddhism.

== Genealogical resources ==
The records for genealogical research are available at the state archive "Statny Archiv in Bytca, Slovakia"

- Roman Catholic church records (births/marriages/deaths): 1674-1896 (parish B)

== See also ==
- List of municipalities and towns in Slovakia
