= Nededza =

Village and municipality in Slovakia

- Municipality
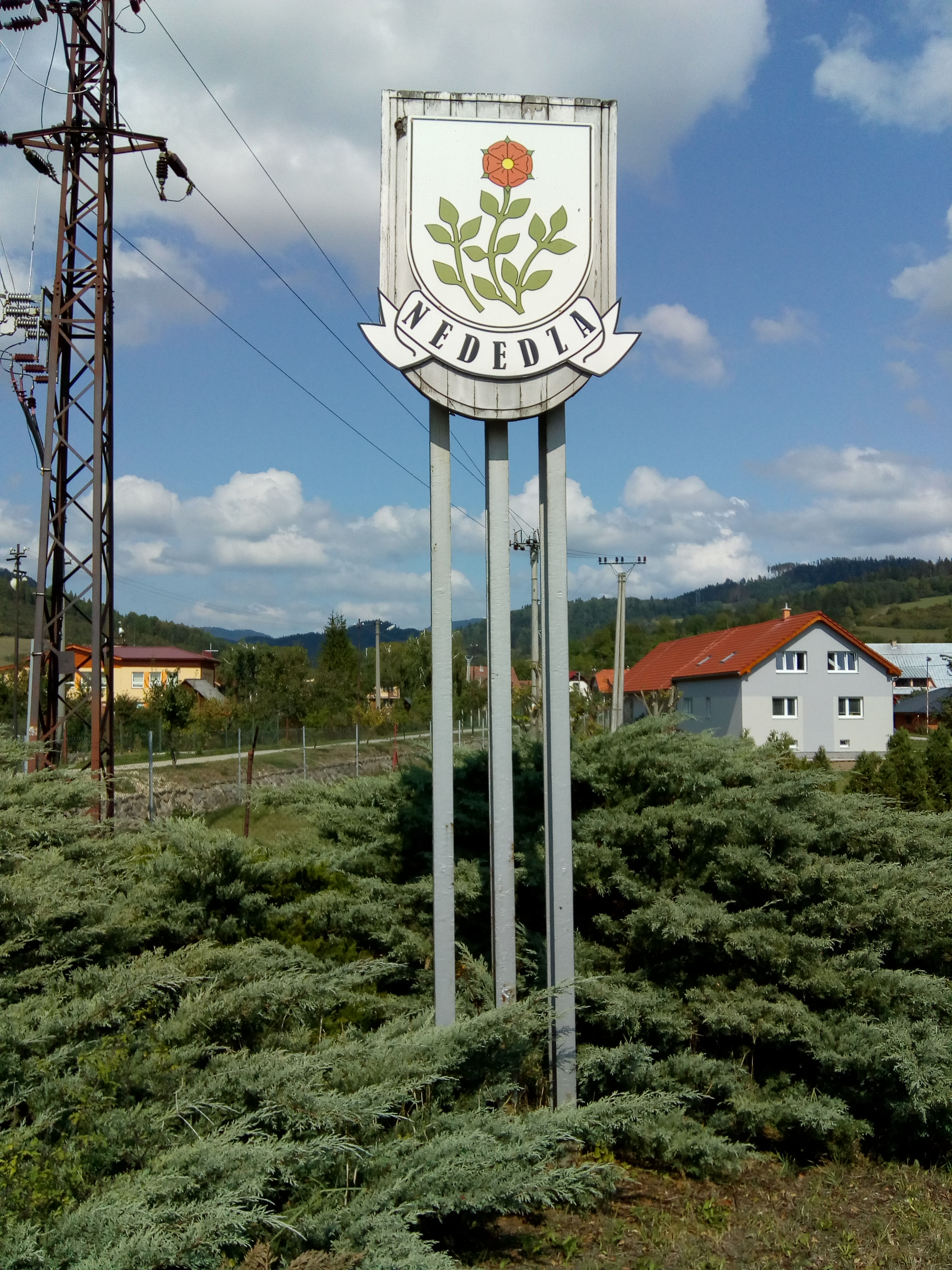

- Flag

- Location of Nededza in the Žilina Region Location of Nededza in Slovakia
- Coordinates: 49.22°N 18.83°E
- Country: Slovakia
- Region: Žilina Region
- District: Žilina District
- First mentioned: 1384

Area
  - Total: 6.31 km^{2} (2.44 sq mi)
- Elevation: 361 m (1,184 ft)

Population (2025)
  - Total: 1,092
- Time zone: UTC+1 (CET)
  - Summer (DST): UTC+2 (CEST)
- Postal code: 130 2
- Area code: +421 41
- Vehicle registration plate (until 2022): ZA
- Website: www.nededza.eu

Nededza (Hungarian: Vágnedec) is a village and municipality in Žilina District in the Žilina Region of northern Slovakia.

== History ==
In historical records the village was first mentioned in 1384.

== Geography ==
The municipality lies at an altitude of 361 metres (1,184 ft) and covers an area of 6.31 km^{2} (2.44 sq mi) (2025).

== Population ==
Population statistic (10 years)
Year	1995	2005	2015	2025
Count	857	937	1012	1092
Difference		+9.33%	+8.00%	+7.90%

Population statistic
Year	2024	2025
Count	1092	1092
Difference		+0%

It has a population of 1092 people (31 December 2025).

=== Ethnicity ===
Census 2021 (1+ %)
Ethnicity	Number	Fraction
Slovak	1044	97.57%
Not found out	25	2.33%
Total	1070	

In year 2021 was 1070 people by ethnicity 1044 as Slovak, 25 as Not found out, 3 as Czech, 3 as Russian, 2 as Italian, 1 as Rusyn, 1 as German and 1 as Other.

Note on population: The difference values of population numbers in the table "Population statistic" and in the sections "Ethnicity" & "Religion" is caused by the use of various statistical methods.

=== Religion ===
Census 2021 (1+ %)
Religion	Number	Fraction
Roman Catholic Church	898	83.93%
None	126	11.78%
Not found out	23	2.15%
Total	1070	

In year 2021 was 1070 people by religion 898 from Roman Catholic Church, 126 from None, 23 from Not found out, 7 from Christian Congregations in Slovakia, 5 from Evangelical Church, 4 from Calvinist Church, 4 from Greek Catholic Church, 2 from Islam and 1 from Other.
