= Kunerad =

- Municipality
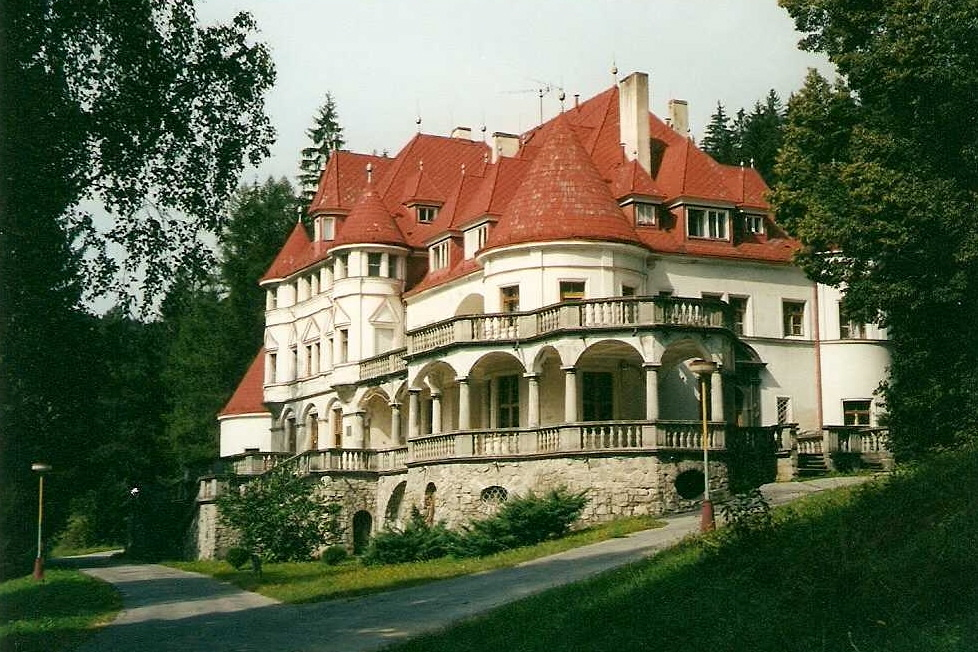

- Flag

- Location of Kunerad in the Žilina Region Location of Kunerad in Slovakia
- Coordinates: 49.10°N 18.71°E
- Country: Slovakia
- Region: Žilina Region
- District: Žilina District
- First mentioned: 1490

Area
  - Total: 22.93 km^{2} (8.85 sq mi)
- Elevation: 499 m (1,637 ft)

Population (2025)
  - Total: 1,165
- Time zone: UTC+1 (CET)
  - Summer (DST): UTC+2 (CEST)
- Postal code: 131 3
- Area code: +421 41
- Vehicle registration plate (until 2022): ZA
- Website: www.obeckunerad.sk

Kunerad (Hungarian: Kenyered) is a village and municipality in Žilina District in the Žilina Region of northern Slovakia.

== History ==
In historical records the village was first mentioned in 1490.

== Geography ==
The municipality lies at an altitude of 499 metres (1,637 ft) and covers an area of 22.93 km^{2} (8.85 sq mi) (2025).

== Population ==
Population statistic (10 years)
Year	1995	2005	2015	2025
Count	883	942	1008	1165
Difference		+6.68%	+7.00%	+15.57%

Population statistic
Year	2024	2025
Count	1144	1165
Difference		+1.83%

It has a population of 1165 people (31 December 2025).

=== Ethnicity ===
Census 2021 (1+ %)
Ethnicity	Number	Fraction
Slovak	1044	99.42%
Total	1050	

In year 2021 was 1050 people by ethnicity 1044 as Slovak, 8 as Czech, 5 as Italian, 2 as Not found out, 1 as Silesian, 1 as Polish, 1 as French and 1 as English.

Note on population: The difference values of population numbers in the table "Population statistic" and in the sections "Ethnicity" & "Religion" is caused by the use of various statistical methods.

=== Religion ===
Census 2021 (1+ %)
Religion	Number	Fraction
Roman Catholic Church	950	90.48%
None	75	7.14%
Total	1050	

In year 2021 was 1050 people by religion 950 from Roman Catholic Church, 75 from None, 6 from Evangelical Church, 4 from Not found out, 4 from Greek Catholic Church, 3 from Christian Congregations in Slovakia, 3 from Other, 1 from Eastern Orthodox Church, 1 from Other and not ascertained christian church, 1 from Buddhism, 1 from Baptists Church and 1 from Ad hoc movements.
