= Svederník =

Village and municipality of Slovakia

- Municipality
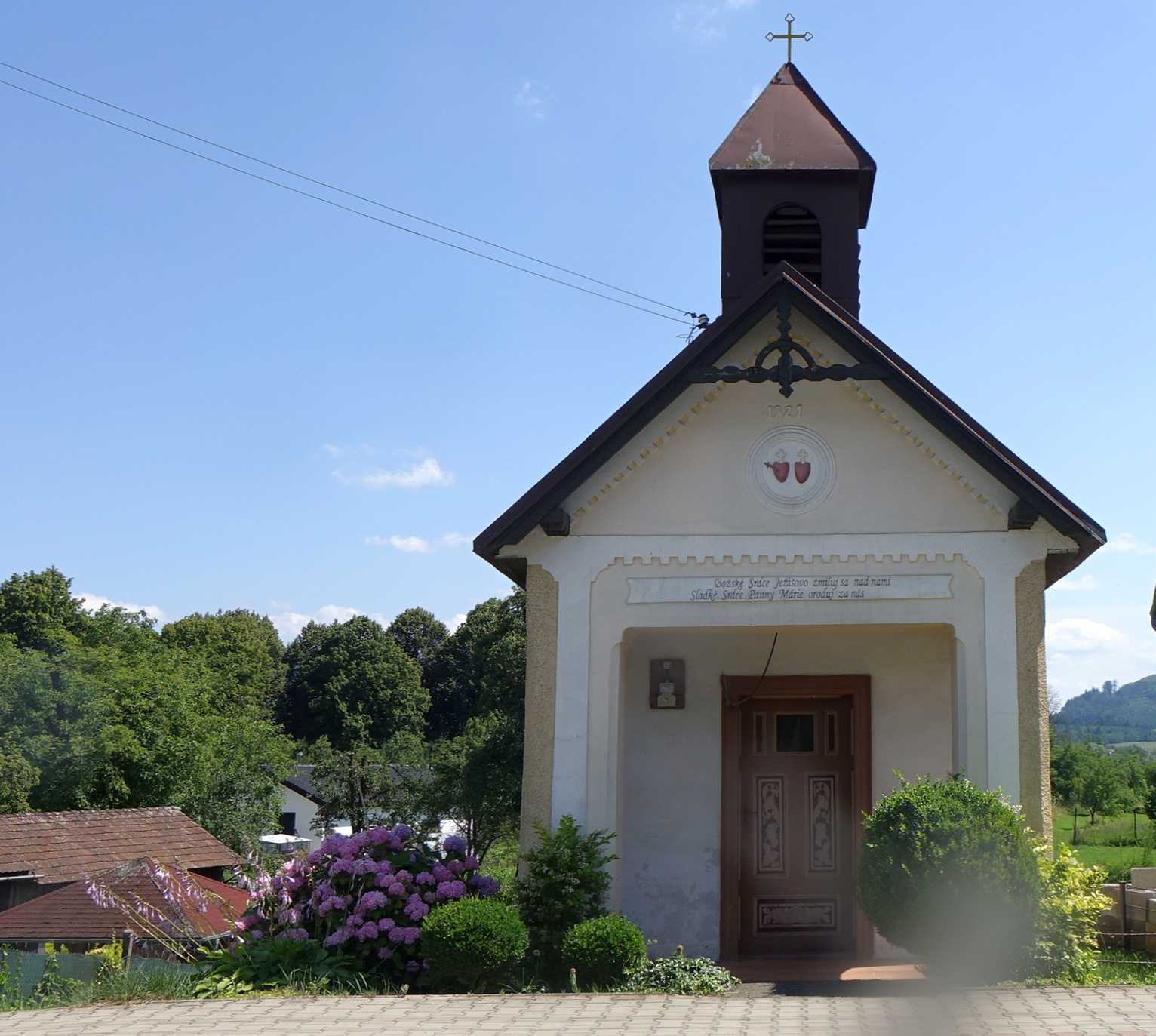

- Flag

- Location of Svederník in the Žilina Region Location of Svederník in Slovakia
- Coordinates: 49.27°N 18.65°E
- Country: Slovakia
- Region: Žilina Region
- District: Žilina District
- First mentioned: 1392

Area
  - Total: 11.56 km^{2} (4.46 sq mi)
- Elevation: 335 m (1,099 ft)

Population (2025)
  - Total: 1,775
- Time zone: UTC+1 (CET)
  - Summer (DST): UTC+2 (CEST)
- Postal code: 133 2
- Area code: +421 41
- Vehicle registration plate (until 2022): ZA
- Website: www.svedernik.info

Svederník (Hungarian: Szedernye) is a village and municipality in Žilina District in the Žilina Region of northern Slovakia.

== History ==
In historical records the village was first mentioned in 1392.

== Geography ==
The municipality lies at an altitude of 335 metres (1,099 ft) and covers an area of 11.56 km^{2} (4.46 sq mi) (2025).

== Population ==
Population statistic (10 years)
Year	1995	2005	2015	2025
Count	910	1007	1106	1775
Difference		+10.65%	+9.83%	+60.48%

Population statistic
Year	2024	2025
Count	1733	1775
Difference		+2.42%

It has a population of 1775 people (31 December 2025).

=== Ethnicity ===
Census 2021 (1+ %)
Ethnicity	Number	Fraction
Slovak	1585	98.2%
Total	1614	

In year 2021 was 1614 people by ethnicity 1585 as Slovak, 16 as Not found out, 15 as Czech, 13 as Other, 5 as Italian, 5 as Rusyn, 2 as Ukrainian, 2 as Romani, 1 as Turkish, 1 as Russian, 1 as Polish, 1 as Hungarian and 1 as Bulgarian.

Note on population: The difference values of population numbers in the table "Population statistic" and in the sections "Ethnicity" & "Religion" is caused by the use of various statistical methods.

=== Religion ===
Census 2021 (1+ %)
Religion	Number	Fraction
Roman Catholic Church	1129	69.95%
None	357	22.12%
Evangelical Church	38	2.35%
Total	1614	

In year 2021 was 1614 people by religion 1129 from Roman Catholic Church, 357 from None, 38 from Evangelical Church, 16 from Not found out, 14 from Other and not ascertained christian church, 14 from Greek Catholic Church, 10 from Christian Congregations in Slovakia, 8 from Other, 8 from Church of the Brethren, 5 from Buddhism, 4 from Ad hoc movements, 3 from Calvinist Church, 3 from Eastern Orthodox Church, 3 from United Methodist Church, 1 from Jehovah's Witnesses and 1 from Islam.
