= Ovčiarsko =

Village and municipality in Slovakia

- Municipality
- Flag

- Location of Ovčiarsko in the Žilina Region Location of Ovčiarsko in Slovakia
- Coordinates: 49.23°N 18.67°E
- Country: Slovakia
- Region: Žilina Region
- District: Žilina District
- First mentioned: 1289

Area
  - Total: 4.89 km^{2} (1.89 sq mi)
- Elevation: 429 m (1,407 ft)

Population (2025)
  - Total: 752
- Time zone: UTC+1 (CET)
  - Summer (DST): UTC+2 (CEST)
- Postal code: 100 4
- Area code: +421 41
- Vehicle registration plate (until 2022): ZA
- Website: www.obecovciarsko.sk

Ovčiarsko (Hungarian: Juhászi) is a village and municipality in Žilina District in the Žilina Region of northern Slovakia.

== History ==
In historical records the village was first mentioned in 1289.

== Geography ==
The municipality lies at an altitude of 429 metres (1,407 ft) and covers an area of 4.89 km^{2} (1.89 sq mi) (2025).

== Population ==
Population statistic (10 years)
Year	1995	2005	2015	2025
Count	437	498	626	752
Difference		+13.95%	+25.70%	+20.12%

Population statistic
Year	2024	2025
Count	744	752
Difference		+1.07%

It has a population of 752 people (31 December 2025).

=== Ethnicity ===
Census 2021 (1+ %)
Ethnicity	Number	Fraction
Slovak	697	98.3%
Not found out	10	1.41%
Total	709	

In year 2021 was 709 people by ethnicity 697 as Slovak, 10 as Not found out, 5 as Other, 3 as Czech, 1 as Ukrainian, 1 as Serbian, 1 as Silesian, 1 as German and 1 as English.

Note on population: The difference values of population numbers in the table "Population statistic" and in the sections "Ethnicity" & "Religion" is caused by the use of various statistical methods.

=== Religion ===
Census 2021 (1+ %)
Religion	Number	Fraction
Roman Catholic Church	564	79.55%
None	110	15.51%
Not found out	11	1.55%
Evangelical Church	10	1.41%
Total	709	

In year 2021 was 709 people by religion 564 from Roman Catholic Church, 110 from None, 11 from Not found out, 10 from Evangelical Church, 4 from Greek Catholic Church, 3 from Eastern Orthodox Church, 3 from Ad hoc movements, 2 from Buddhism, 1 from Christian Congregations in Slovakia and 1 from Other.
