= Kľače =

Village and municipality in Slovakia

- Municipality
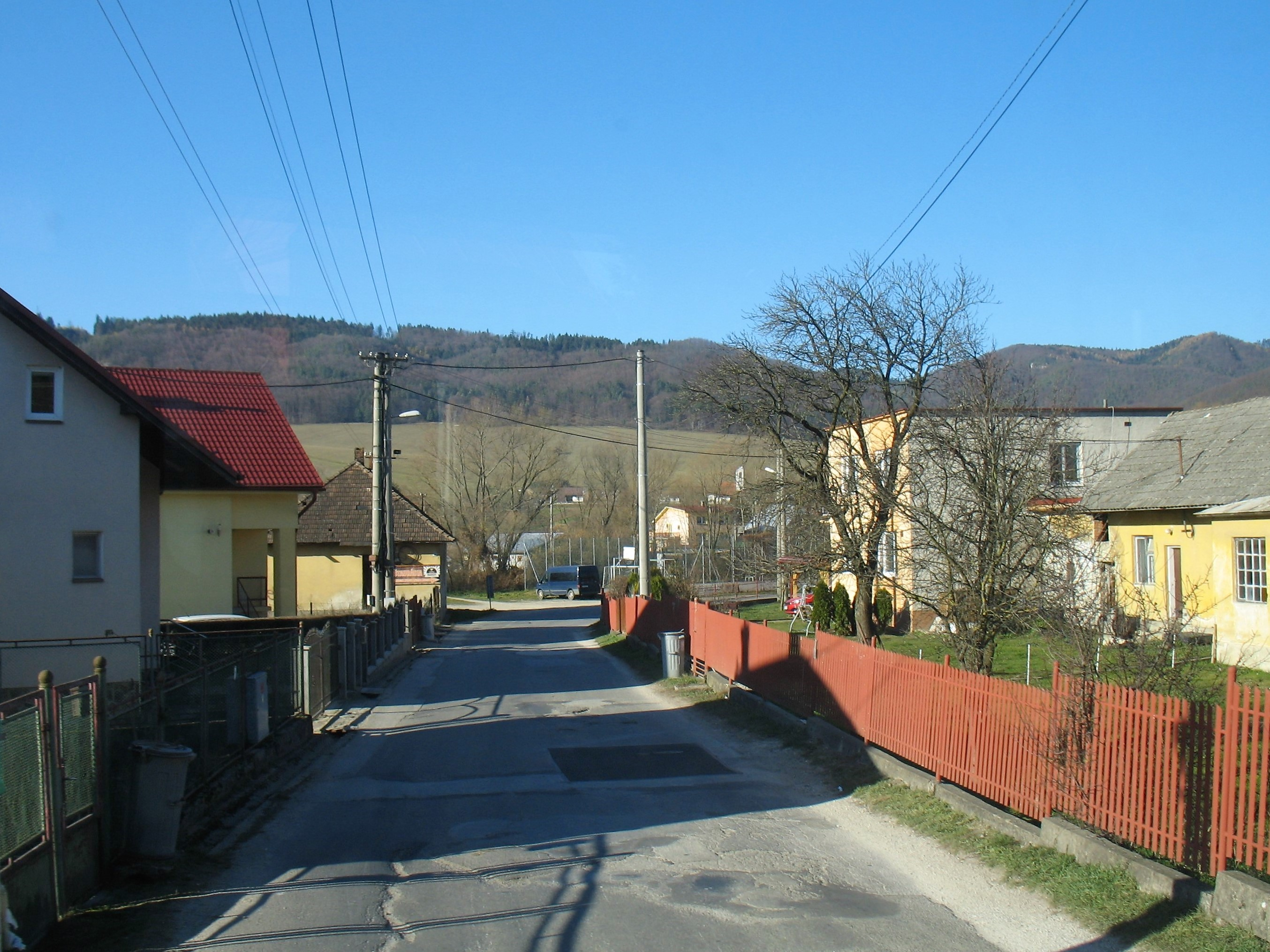

- Flag

- Location of Kľače in the Žilina Region Location of Kľače in Slovakia
- Coordinates: 49.10°N 18.65°E
- Country: Slovakia
- Region: Žilina Region
- District: Žilina District
- First mentioned: 1511

Area
  - Total: 2.07 km^{2} (0.80 sq mi)
- Elevation: 443 m (1,453 ft)

Population (2025)
  - Total: 429
- Time zone: UTC+1 (CET)
  - Summer (DST): UTC+2 (CEST)
- Postal code: 131 9
- Area code: +421 41
- Vehicle registration plate (until 2022): ZA
- Website: www.klace.sk

Kľače (Hungarian: Kalacsány) is a village and municipality in Žilina District in the Žilina Region of northern Slovakia.

== History ==
In historical records the village was first mentioned in 1511.

== Geography ==
The municipality lies at an altitude of 443 metres (1,453 ft) and covers an area of 2.07 km^{2} (0.80 sq mi) (2025).

== Population ==
Population statistic (10 years)
Year	1995	2005	2015	2025
Count	358	372	400	429
Difference		+3.91%	+7.52%	+7.25%

Population statistic
Year	2024	2025
Count	438	429
Difference		−2.05%

It has a population of 429 people (31 December 2025).

=== Ethnicity ===
Census 2021 (1+ %)
Ethnicity	Number	Fraction
Slovak	414	98.8%
Czech	9	2.14%
Total	419	

In year 2021 was 419 people by ethnicity 414 as Slovak, 9 as Czech, 2 as Polish, 2 as Not found out, 1 as Romanian, 1 as German, 1 as Hungarian and 1 as Other.

Note on population: The difference values of population numbers in the table "Population statistic" and in the sections "Ethnicity" & "Religion" is caused by the use of various statistical methods.

=== Religion ===
Census 2021 (1+ %)
Religion	Number	Fraction
Roman Catholic Church	360	85.92%
None	47	11.22%
Total	419	

In year 2021 was 419 people by religion 360 from Roman Catholic Church, 47 from None, 3 from Not found out, 2 from Christian Congregations in Slovakia, 2 from Other, 2 from Ad hoc movements, 1 from Eastern Orthodox Church, 1 from Greek Catholic Church and 1 from Buddhism.

== Genealogical resources ==
The records for genealogical research are available at the state archive "Statny Archiv in Bytca, Slovakia"

- Roman Catholic church records (births/marriages/deaths): 1674-1896 (parish B)

== See also ==
- List of municipalities and towns in Slovakia
