= Malá Čierna =

Village and municipality in Slovakia

- Municipality
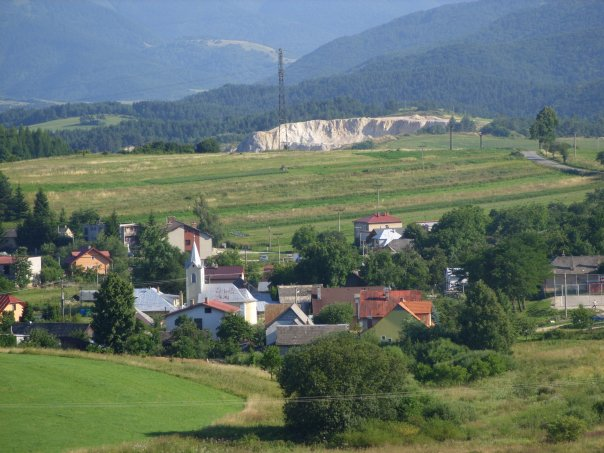

- Flag

- Location of Malá Čierna in the Žilina Region Location of Malá Čierna in Slovakia
- Coordinates: 49.10°N 18.60°E
- Country: Slovakia
- Region: Žilina Region
- District: Žilina District
- First mentioned: 1471

Area
  - Total: 4.26 km^{2} (1.64 sq mi)
- Elevation: 523 m (1,716 ft)

Population (2025)
  - Total: 338
- Time zone: UTC+1 (CET)
  - Summer (DST): UTC+2 (CEST)
- Postal code: 150 1
- Area code: +421 41
- Vehicle registration plate (until 2022): ZA
- Website: www.malacierna.sk

Malá Čierna (Hungarian: Kiscserna) is a village and municipality in Žilina District in the Žilina Region of northern Slovakia.

== History ==
In historical records the village was first mentioned in 1471.

== Geography ==
The municipality lies at an altitude of 523 metres (1,716 ft) and covers an area of 4.26 km^{2} (1.64 sq mi) (2025).

== Population ==
Population statistic (10 years)
Year	1995	2005	2015	2025
Count	297	337	360	338
Difference		+13.46%	+6.82%	−6.11%

Population statistic
Year	2024	2025
Count	335	338
Difference		+0.89%

It has a population of 338 people (31 December 2025).

=== Ethnicity ===
Census 2021 (1+ %)
Ethnicity	Number	Fraction
Slovak	323	97.58%
Not found out	5	1.51%
Total	331	

In year 2021 was 331 people by ethnicity 323 as Slovak, 5 as Not found out, 2 as Other, 1 as Czech, 1 as Romani, 1 as German and 1 as Hungarian.

Note on population: The difference values of population numbers in the table "Population statistic" and in the sections "Ethnicity" & "Religion" is caused by the use of various statistical methods.

=== Religion ===
Census 2021 (1+ %)
Religion	Number	Fraction
Roman Catholic Church	285	86.1%
None	31	9.37%
Not found out	9	2.72%
Evangelical Church	4	1.21%
Total	331	

In year 2021 was 331 people by religion 285 from Roman Catholic Church, 31 from None, 9 from Not found out, 4 from Evangelical Church and 2 from Christian Congregations in Slovakia.
