= Ďurčiná =

Village and municipality in Slovakia

- Municipality
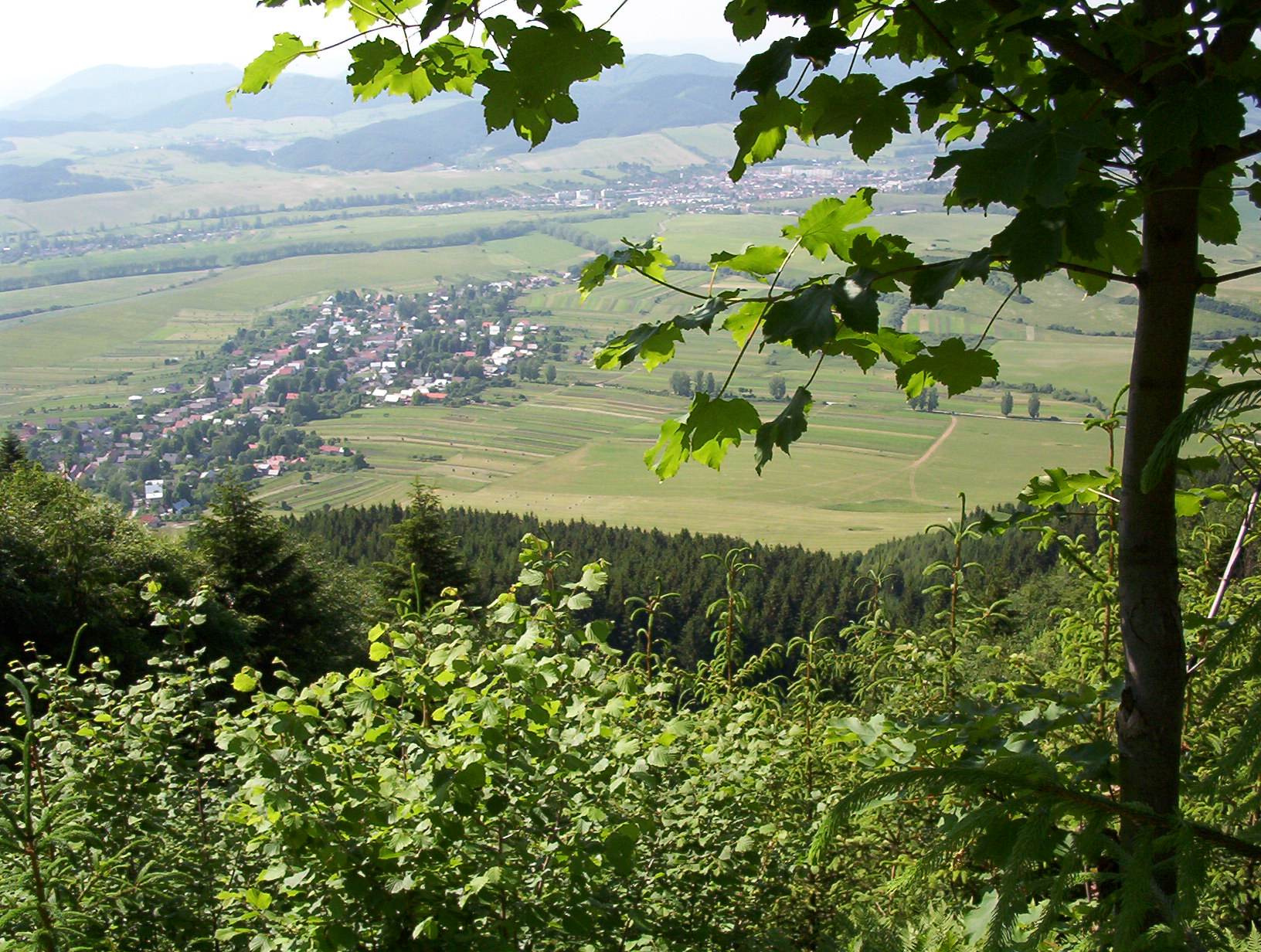

- Flag

- Location of Ďurčiná in the Žilina Region Location of Ďurčiná in Slovakia
- Coordinates: 49.07°N 18.67°E
- Country: Slovakia
- Region: Žilina Region
- District: Žilina District
- First mentioned: 1393

Area
  - Total: 12.50 km^{2} (4.83 sq mi)
- Elevation: 514 m (1,686 ft)

Population (2025)
  - Total: 1,094
- Time zone: UTC+1 (CET)
  - Summer (DST): UTC+2 (CEST)
- Postal code: 150 1
- Area code: +421 41
- Vehicle registration plate (until 2022): ZA
- Website: www.obecdurcina.sk

Ďurčiná (Hungarian: Györkeháza) is a village and municipality in Žilina District in the Žilina Region of northern Slovakia.

== History ==
In historical records the village was first mentioned in 1393.

== Geography ==
The municipality lies at an altitude of 514 metres (1,686 ft) and covers an area of 12.50 km^{2} (4.83 sq mi) (2025).

== Population ==
Population statistic (10 years)
Year	1995	2005	2015	2025
Count	986	1077	1084	1094
Difference		+9.22%	+0.64%	+0.92%

Population statistic
Year	2024	2025
Count	1080	1094
Difference		+1.29%

It has a population of 1094 people (31 December 2025).

=== Ethnicity ===
Census 2021 (1+ %)
Ethnicity	Number	Fraction
Slovak	1080	98.54%
Not found out	20	1.82%
Total	1096	

In year 2021 was 1096 people by ethnicity 1080 as Slovak, 20 as Not found out, 7 as Czech, 3 as Polish, 3 as German, 1 as Rusyn and 1 as Russian.

Note on population: The difference values of population numbers in the table "Population statistic" and in the sections "Ethnicity" & "Religion" is caused by the use of various statistical methods.

=== Religion ===
Census 2021 (1+ %)
Religion	Number	Fraction
Roman Catholic Church	1024	93.43%
None	46	4.2%
Total	1096	

In year 2021 was 1096 people by religion 1024 from Roman Catholic Church, 46 from None, 10 from Not found out, 7 from Church of Jesus Christ of Latter-day Saints, 3 from Christian Congregations in Slovakia, 3 from Greek Catholic Church, 2 from Ad hoc movements and 1 from Buddhism.

== Genealogical resources ==
The records for genealogical research are available at the state archive "Statny Archiv in Bytca, Slovakia"

- Roman Catholic church records (births/marriages/deaths): 1674-1896 (parish B)

== See also ==
- List of municipalities and towns in Slovakia
