= Šuja =

Municipality of Slovakia

- Municipality
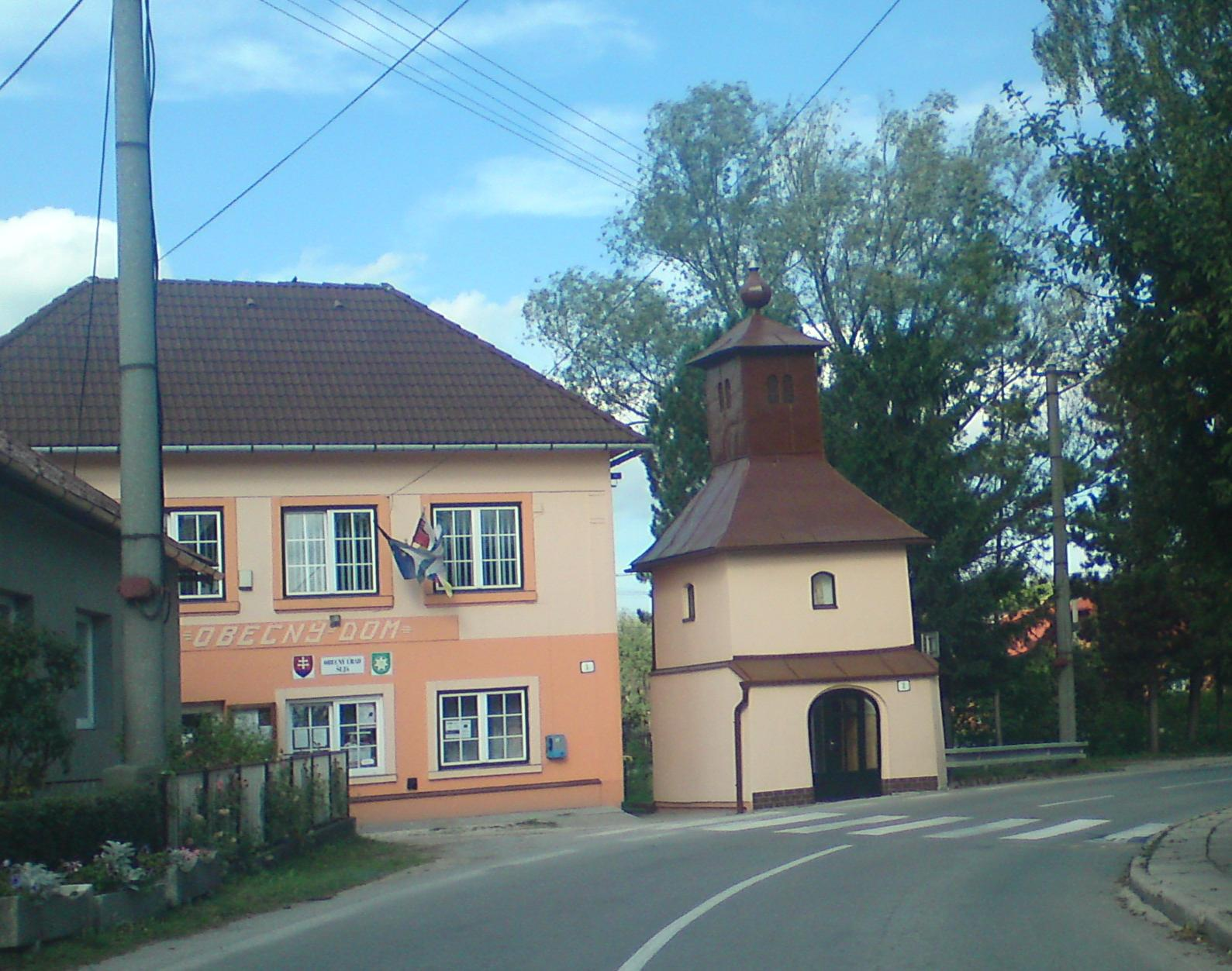
- The municipal house of Šuja

- Flag

- Location of Šuja in the Žilina Region Location of Šuja in Slovakia
- Coordinates: 49.07°N 18.63°E
- Country: Slovakia
- Region: Žilina Region
- District: Žilina District
- First mentioned: 1393

Government
  - Mayor: Michal Pastorek (Ind.)

Area
  - Total: 0.00 km^{2} (0 sq mi)
- Elevation: 467 m (1,532 ft)

Population (2025)
  - Total: 333
- Time zone: UTC+1 (CET)
  - Summer (DST): UTC+2 (CEST)
- Postal code: 150 1
- Area code: +421 41
- Vehicle registration plate (until 2022): ZA
- Website: www.obecsuja.sk/index.php/sk/

Šuja (Hungarian: Suja) is a village municipality in Žilina District in the Žilina Region of northern Slovakia.

== History ==
The village was first mentioned in 1393.

== Geography ==
The municipality lies at an altitude of 467 metres (1,532 ft) and covers an area of 0.00 km^{2} (0 sq mi) (2025).

== Population ==
Population statistic (10 years)
| Year | 1995 | 2005 | 2015 | 2025 |
|---|---|---|---|---|
| Count | 0 | 321 | 314 | 333 |
| Difference | | – | −2.18% | +6.05% |

Population statistic
| Year | 2024 | 2025 |
|---|---|---|
| Count | 323 | 333 |
| Difference | | +3.09% |

It has a population of 333 people (31 December 2025).

=== Ethnicity ===
Census 2021 (1+ %)
| Ethnicity | Number | Fraction |
|---|---|---|
| Slovak | 319 | 97.55% |
| Not found out | 6 | 1.83% |
| Czech | 4 | 1.22% |
| Total | 327 | |

In year 2021 was 327 people by ethnicity 319 as Slovak, 6 as Not found out, 4 as Czech, 1 as Ukrainian, 1 as Serbian, 1 as Romani and 1 as Russian.

Note on population: The difference values of population numbers in the table "Population statistic" and in the sections "Ethnicity" & "Religion" is caused by the use of various statistical methods.

=== Religion ===
Census 2021 (1+ %)
| Religion | Number | Fraction |
|---|---|---|
| Roman Catholic Church | 279 | 85.32% |
| None | 32 | 9.79% |
| Christian Congregations in Slovakia | 7 | 2.14% |
| Not found out | 4 | 1.22% |
| Total | 327 | |

In year 2021 was 327 people by religion 279 from Roman Catholic Church, 32 from None, 7 from Christian Congregations in Slovakia, 4 from Not found out, 2 from Other and not ascertained christian church, 1 from Other, 1 from Evangelical Church and 1 from Ad hoc movements.
