= Žilina District =

Coordinates: 49°13′15″N 18°44′26″E

- District
- Country: Slovakia
- Region (kraj): Žilina Region
- Cultural region: Upper Považie
- Seat: Žilina

Area
  - Total: 815.08 km^{2} (314.70 sq mi)

Population (2025)
  - Total: 159,997
- Time zone: UTC+1 (CET)
  - Summer (DST): UTC+2 (CEST)
- Telephone prefix: 041
- Vehicle registration plate (until 2022): ZA
- Municipalities: 53

Žilina District (Slovak: Okres Žilina) is an okres (district) of the Žilina Region in north-western Slovakia. The district was first established in 1923. Its present borders date from 1996. The heart of the district is the Váh and Rajec river valleys. Urbanization has led to the district's becoming one of Slovakia's most highly developed areas.

== Population ==
Historical population
Year	Pop.	±%
1970	124,130	—
1980	140,396	+13.1%
1991	151,781	+8.1%
2001	156,361	+3.0%
2011	154,205	−1.4%
2021	161,377	+4.7%
Source: Censuses

Population statistic (10 years)
Year	1995	2005	2015	2025
Count	155,513	157,407	156,411	159,997
Difference		+1.21%	−0.63%	+2.29%

Population statistic
Year	2024	2025
Count	160,360	159,997
Difference		−0.22%

It has a population of 159,997 people (31 December 2025).

=== Ethnicity ===
Census 2021 (1+ %)
Ethnicity	Number	Fraction
Slovak	153,101	93%
Not found out	6828	4.14%
Czech	1818	1.1%
Total	164,616	

In year 2021 was 164,616 people by ethnicity 153,101 as Slovak, 6828 as Not found out, 1818 as Czech, 699 as Other, 246 as Russian, 236 as Romani, 231 as Hungarian, 183 as Ukrainian, 183 as Rusyn, 160 as Polish, 155 as German, 129 as Korean, 91 as Moravian, 81 as Italian, 53 as Chinese, 50 as Jewish, 46 as Vietnamese, 42 as English, 40 as French, 36 as Croatian, 32 as Serbian, 31 as Bulgarian, 25 as Canadian, 24 as Austrian, 22 as Irish, 18 as Albanian, 14 as Silesian, 13 as Turkish, 13 as Romanian, 11 as Greek and 5 as Iranian.

Note on population: The difference values of population numbers in the table "Population statistic" and in the sections "Ethnicity" & "Religion" is caused by the use of various statistical methods.

=== Religion ===
Census 2021 (1+ %)
Religion	Number	Fraction
Roman Catholic Church	111,792	69.27%
None	34,189	21.19%
Not found out	7707	4.78%
Evangelical Church	3082	1.91%
Total	161,377	

In year 2021 was 161,377 people by religion 111,792 from Roman Catholic Church, 34,189 from None, 7707 from Not found out, 3082 from Evangelical Church, 909 from Greek Catholic Church, 664 from Christian Congregations in Slovakia, 530 from Ad hoc movements, 503 from Other, 393 from Other and not ascertained christian church, 254 from Eastern Orthodox Church, 244 from Buddhism, 212 from Calvinist Church, 200 from Jehovah's Witnesses, 141 from Church of the Brethren, 139 from Paganism and natural spirituality, 87 from Islam, 60 from Old Catholic Church, 40 from Seventh-day Adventist Church, 39 from United Methodist Church, 38 from Baptists Church, 38 from Apostolic Church, 35 from Jewish community, 30 from Church of Jesus Christ of Latter-day Saints, 25 from Hinduism, 20 from Czechoslovak Hussite Church and 6 from Bahá'i Community.

== Municipalities ==
Municipality	Area [km^{2}]	Population
Belá	38.60	3,240
Bitarová	3.64	917
Brežany	3.65	681
Čičmany	25.61	125
Divina	21.88	2,459
Divinka	5.17	1,021
Dlhé Pole	41.02	1,956
Dolná Tižina	13.11	1,530
Dolný Hričov	12.45	1,704
Ďurčiná	12.50	1,094
Fačkov	37.51	654
Gbeľany	7.13	1,586
Hôrky	2.31	1,056
Horný Hričov	5.78	879
Hričovské Podhradie	2.04	344
Jasenové	6.27	600
Kamenná Poruba	14.18	1,859
Kľače	2.07	429
Konská	5.31	1,686
Kotrčiná Lúčka	4.14	698
Krasňany	15.17	1,702
Kunerad	22.93	1,165
Lietava	10.00	1,765
Lietavská Lúčka	6.49	1,869
Lietavská Svinná-Babkov	18.29	1,727
Lutiše	20.08	748
Lysica	15.52	896
Malá Čierna	4.26	338
Mojš	2.59	1,515
Nededza	6.31	1,092
Nezbudská Lúčka	8.21	397
Ovčiarsko	4.89	752
Paština Závada	7.32	265
Podhorie	6.41	1,099
Porúbka	3.45	531
Rajec	33.98	5,641
Rajecká Lesná	39.26	1,171
Rajecké Teplice	11.84	2,843
Rosina	7.32	3,366
Stráňavy	10.87	1,874
Stránske	18.75	947
Stráža	3.17	691
Strečno	13.17	2,553
Svederník	11.56	1,775
Šuja	0.00	333
Teplička nad Váhom	10.87	4,359
Terchová	84.54	3,912
Turie	27.20	2,174
Varín	19.09	3,841
Veľká Čierna	4.82	375
Višňové	15.17	2,988
Zbyňov	7.04	902
Žilina	80.02	79,873

Population and area values are current for year 2025.
