= Gbeľany =

- Municipality
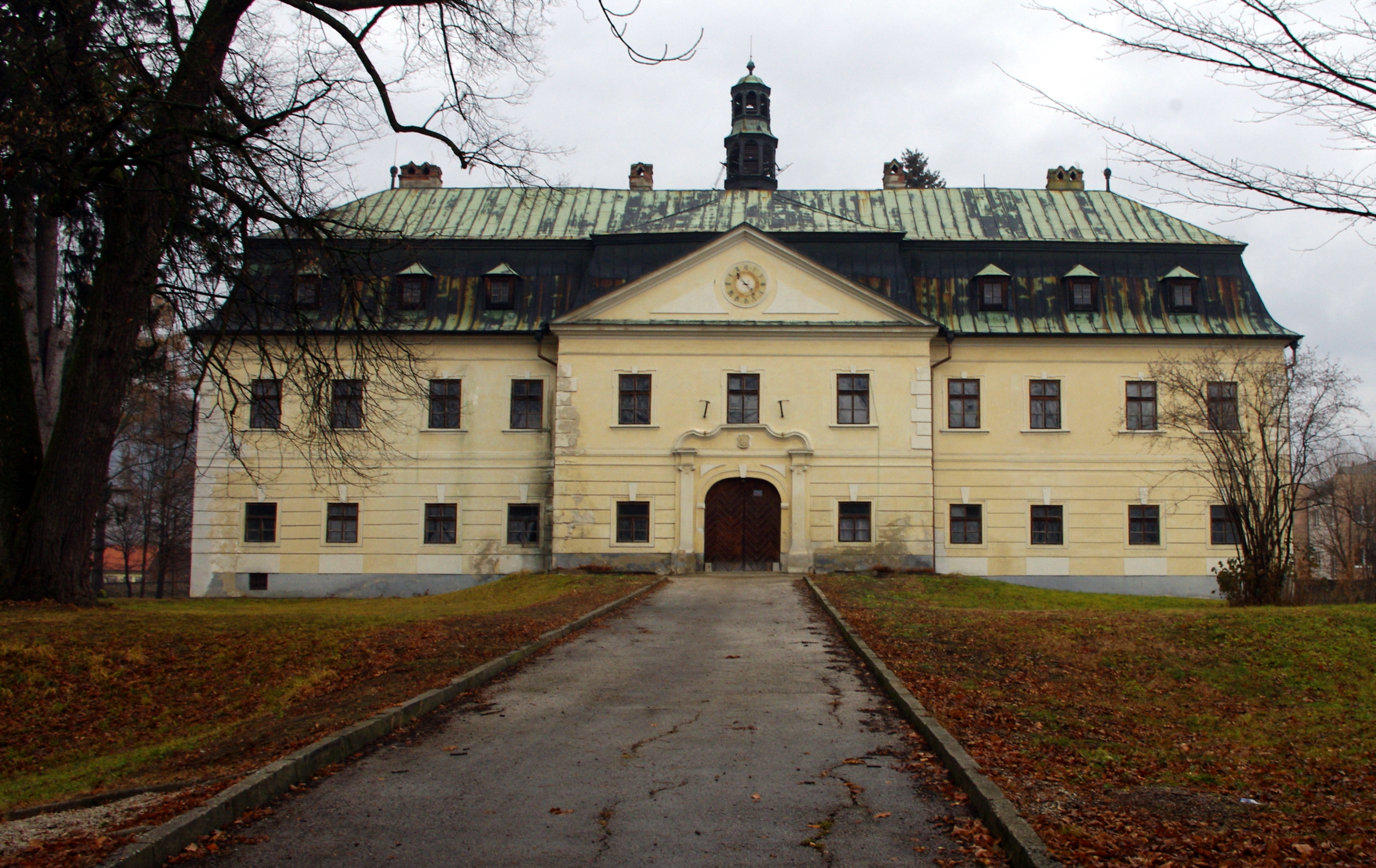

- Flag

- Location of Gbeľany in the Žilina Region Location of Gbeľany in Slovakia
- Coordinates: 49.21°N 18.85°E
- Country: Slovakia
- Region: Žilina Region
- District: Žilina District
- First mentioned: 1362

Area
  - Total: 7.13 km^{2} (2.75 sq mi)
- Elevation: 361 m (1,184 ft)

Population (2025)
  - Total: 1,586
- Time zone: UTC+1 (CET)
  - Summer (DST): UTC+2 (CEST)
- Postal code: 130 2
- Area code: +421 41
- Vehicle registration plate (until 2022): ZA
- Website: www.gbelany.eu

Gbeľany (Hungarian: Egbelény) is a village and municipality in Žilina District in the Žilina Region of northern Slovakia.

== History ==
In historical records the village was first mentioned in 1362.

== Geography ==
The municipality lies at an altitude of 361 metres (1,184 ft) and covers an area of 7.13 km^{2} (2.75 sq mi) (2025).

== Population ==
Population statistic (10 years)
Year	1995	2005	2015	2025
Count	1160	1231	1266	1586
Difference		+6.12%	+2.84%	+25.27%

Population statistic
Year	2024	2025
Count	1586	1586
Difference		+0%

It has a population of 1586 people (31 December 2025).

=== Ethnicity ===
Census 2021 (1+ %)
Ethnicity	Number	Fraction
Slovak	1414	97.58%
Not found out	30	2.07%
Total	1449	

In year 2021 was 1449 people by ethnicity 1414 as Slovak, 30 as Not found out, 8 as Czech, 6 as Other, 5 as Korean, 2 as Russian, 2 as French, 2 as Croatian, 2 as English, 1 as Italian, 1 as German and 1 as Hungarian.

Note on population: The difference values of population numbers in the table "Population statistic" and in the sections "Ethnicity" & "Religion" is caused by the use of various statistical methods.

=== Religion ===
Census 2021 (1+ %)
Religion	Number	Fraction
Roman Catholic Church	1111	76.67%
None	269	18.56%
Not found out	26	1.79%
Evangelical Church	16	1.1%
Total	1449	

In year 2021 was 1449 people by religion 1111 from Roman Catholic Church, 269 from None, 26 from Not found out, 16 from Evangelical Church, 7 from Greek Catholic Church, 4 from Ad hoc movements, 3 from Paganism and natural spirituality, 2 from Calvinist Church, 2 from Other and not ascertained christian church, 2 from Christian Congregations in Slovakia, 2 from Other, 1 from Eastern Orthodox Church, 1 from Islam, 1 from Czechoslovak Hussite Church, 1 from Buddhism and 1 from Bahá'i Community.

== Notable people ==
- Ján Franek, former boxer who represented Czechoslovakia and winner of the 1980 Summer Olympics bronze medal.

== Genealogical resources ==
The records for genealogical research are available at the state archive "Statny Archiv in Bytca, Slovakia"

- Roman Catholic church records (births/marriages/deaths): 1686-1896 (parish B)

== See also ==
- List of municipalities and towns in Slovakia
