= Konská, Žilina District =

Konská
- Municipality
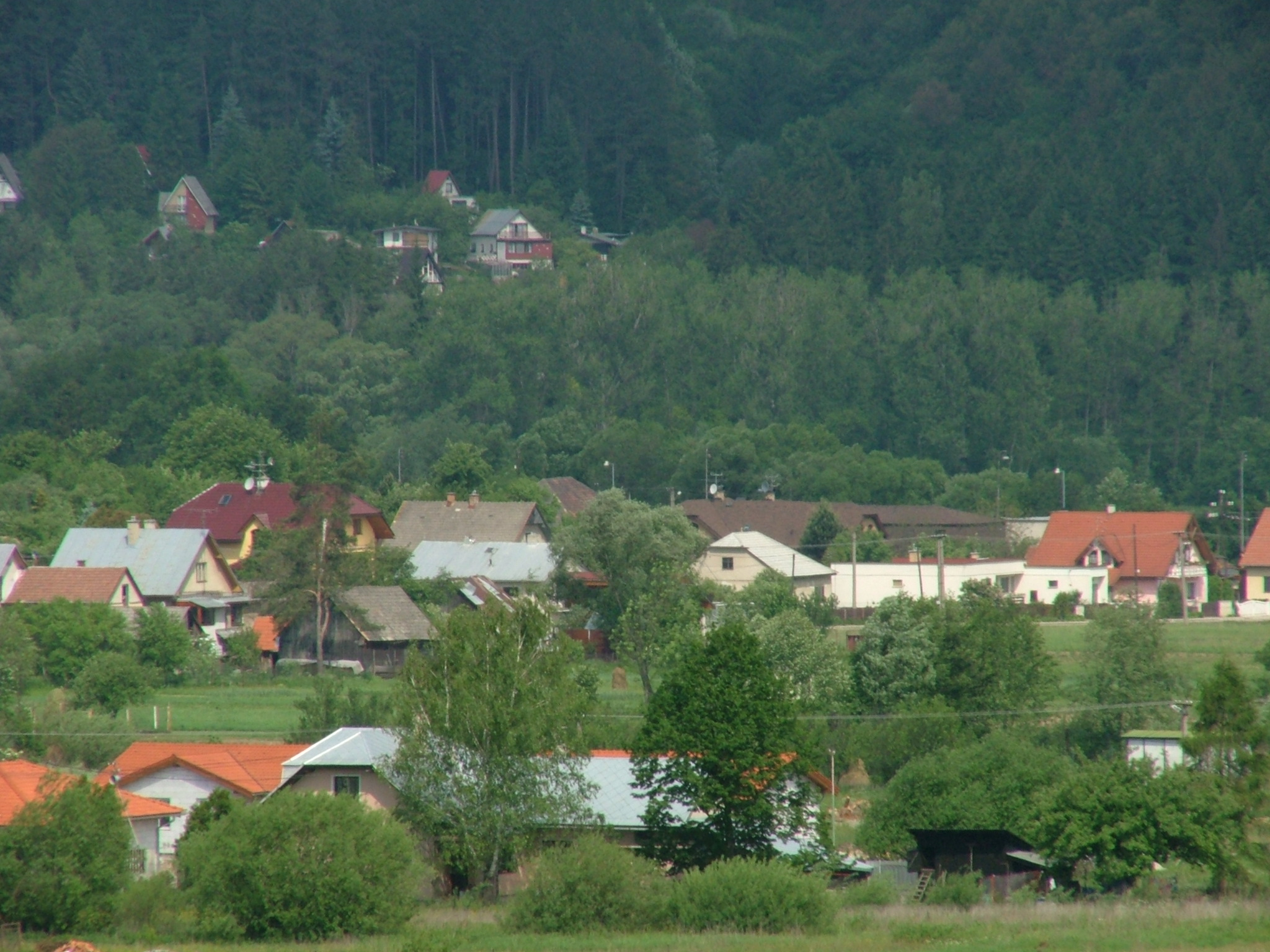

- Flag

- Location of Konská in the Žilina Region Location of Konská in Slovakia
- Coordinates: 49°06′50″N 18°40′40″E
- Country: Slovakia
- Region: Žilina Region
- District: Žilina District
- First mentioned: 1350

Area
  - Total: 5.31 km^{2} (2.05 sq mi)
- Elevation: 435 m (1,427 ft)

Population (2025)
  - Total: 1,686
- Time zone: UTC+1 (CET)
  - Summer (DST): UTC+2 (CEST)
- Postal code: 131 3
- Area code: +421 41
- Vehicle registration plate (until 2022): ZA
- Website: www.obeckonska.info

Konská (Hungarian: Kunfalva) is a village and municipality in Žilina District in the Žilina Region of northern Slovakia.

== History ==
In historical records the village was first mentioned in 1228, when a church was built. Since 1350, the village is independent.

== Geography ==
The municipality lies at an altitude of 435 metres (1,427 ft) and covers an area of 5.31 km^{2} (2.05 sq mi) (2025). The actual major is Janka Stupňanová. The municipality council has 7 members.

== Population ==
Population statistic (10 years)
Year	1995	2005	2015	2025
Count	1177	1374	1514	1686
Difference		+16.73%	+10.18%	+11.36%

Population statistic
Year	2024	2025
Count	1676	1686
Difference		+0.59%

It has a population of 1686 people (31 December 2025).

=== Ethnicity ===
Census 2021 (1+ %)
Ethnicity	Number	Fraction
Slovak	1631	98.84%
Total	1650	

In year 2021 was 1650 people by ethnicity 1631 as Slovak, 14 as Not found out, 7 as Czech, 6 as Rusyn, 5 as Other, 3 as Hungarian, 2 as Irish, 2 as Polish, 1 as Ukrainian, 1 as Serbian, 1 as Russian, 1 as German, 1 as Korean and 1 as Croatian.

Note on population: The difference values of population numbers in the table "Population statistic" and in the sections "Ethnicity" & "Religion" is caused by the use of various statistical methods.

=== Religion ===
Census 2021 (1+ %)
Religion	Number	Fraction
Roman Catholic Church	1386	84%
None	194	11.76%
Evangelical Church	20	1.21%
Total	1650	

In year 2021 was 1650 people by religion 1386 from Roman Catholic Church, 194 from None, 20 from Evangelical Church, 16 from Greek Catholic Church, 10 from Not found out, 5 from Church of the Brethren, 3 from Calvinist Church, 3 from Christian Congregations in Slovakia, 3 from Ad hoc movements, 2 from Eastern Orthodox Church, 2 from Paganism and natural spirituality, 2 from Other and not ascertained christian church, 2 from Buddhism, 1 from Jehovah's Witnesses and 1 from Islam.

== See also ==
- List of municipalities and towns in Slovakia

== Genealogical resources ==
The records for genealogical research are available at the state archive "Statny Archiv in Bytca, Slovakia"

- Roman Catholic church records (births/marriages/deaths): 1750-1910 (parish A)
