= Hôrky =

Village and municipality in Slovakia

- Municipality
- Flag

- Location of Hôrky in the Žilina Region Location of Hôrky in Slovakia
- Coordinates: 49.20°N 18.70°E
- Country: Slovakia
- Region: Žilina Region
- District: Žilina District
- First mentioned: 1393

Area
  - Total: 2.31 km^{2} (0.89 sq mi)
- Elevation: 375 m (1,230 ft)

Population (2025)
  - Total: 1,056
- Time zone: UTC+1 (CET)
  - Summer (DST): UTC+2 (CEST)
- Postal code: 100 4
- Area code: +421 41
- Vehicle registration plate (until 2022): ZA
- Website: www.obechorky.sk

Hôrky (Hungarian: Zsolnaberkes) is a village and municipality in Žilina District in the Žilina Region of northern Slovakia.

== History ==
In historical records the village was first mentioned in 1393.

== Geography ==
The municipality lies at an altitude of 375 metres (1,230 ft) and covers an area of 2.31 km^{2} (0.89 sq mi) (2025).

== Population ==
Population statistic (10 years)
Year	1995	2005	2015	2025
Count	584	628	765	1056
Difference		+7.53%	+21.81%	+38.03%

Population statistic
Year	2024	2025
Count	1042	1056
Difference		+1.34%

It has a population of 1056 people (31 December 2025).

=== Ethnicity ===
Census 2021 (1+ %)
Ethnicity	Number	Fraction
Slovak	866	98.18%
Not found out	14	1.58%
Total	882	

In year 2021 was 882 people by ethnicity 866 as Slovak, 14 as Not found out, 8 as Czech, 5 as Other and 1 as Polish.

Note on population: The difference values of population numbers in the table "Population statistic" and in the sections "Ethnicity" & "Religion" is caused by the use of various statistical methods.

=== Religion ===
Census 2021 (1+ %)
Religion	Number	Fraction
Roman Catholic Church	671	76.08%
None	157	17.8%
Evangelical Church	18	2.04%
Not found out	15	1.7%
Total	882	

In year 2021 was 882 people by religion 671 from Roman Catholic Church, 157 from None, 18 from Evangelical Church, 15 from Not found out, 8 from Greek Catholic Church, 6 from Christian Congregations in Slovakia, 2 from Ad hoc movements, 1 from Jewish community, 1 from Paganism and natural spirituality, 1 from Other and not ascertained christian church, 1 from Other and 1 from Buddhism.

== Genealogical resources ==
The records for genealogical research are available at the state archive "Statny Archiv in Bytca, Slovakia"

- Roman Catholic church records (births/marriages/deaths): 1725-1925 (parish B)

== See also ==
- List of municipalities and towns in Slovakia
