= Podhorie, Žilina District =

Village and municipality in Slovakia

Podhorie
- Municipality
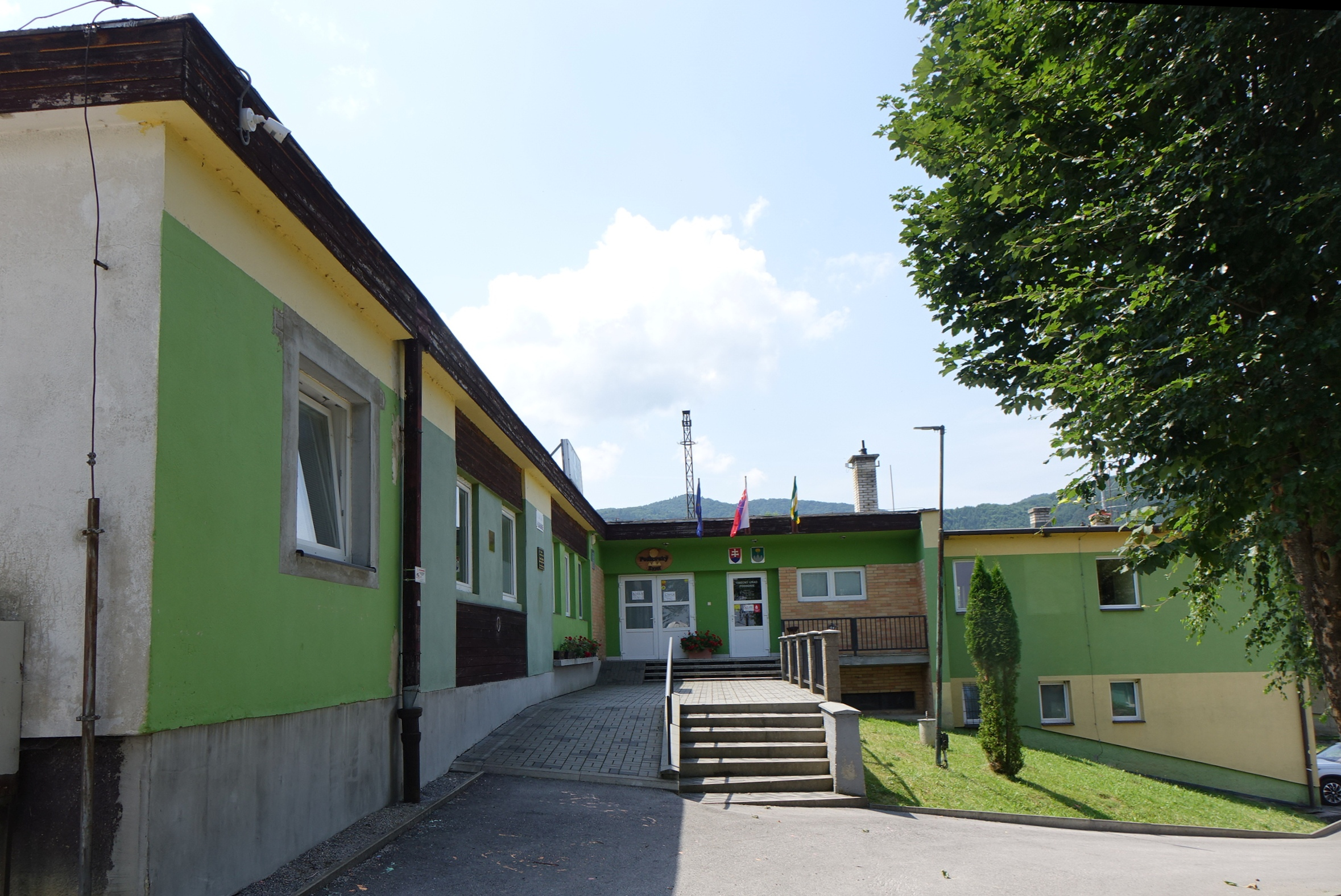

- Flag

- Location of Podhorie in the Žilina Region Location of Podhorie in Slovakia
- Coordinates: 49°10′20″N 18°38′30″E
- Country: Slovakia
- Region: Žilina Region
- District: Žilina District
- First mentioned: 1393

Area
  - Total: 6.41 km^{2} (2.47 sq mi)
- Elevation: 460 m (1,510 ft)

Population (2025)
  - Total: 1,099
- Time zone: UTC+1 (CET)
  - Summer (DST): UTC+2 (CEST)
- Postal code: 131 8
- Area code: +421 41
- Vehicle registration plate (until 2022): ZA
- Website: www.obecpodhorie.info

Podhorie (Hungarian: Zsolnaerdőd, until 1899 Podhorje) is a village and municipality in Žilina District in the Žilina Region of northern Slovakia.

== History ==
In historical records the village was first mentioned in 1393.

== Geography ==
The municipality lies at an altitude of 460 metres (1,510 ft) and covers an area of 6.41 km^{2} (2.47 sq mi) (2025).

== Population ==
Population statistic (10 years)
Year	1995	2005	2015	2025
Count	742	771	873	1099
Difference		+3.90%	+13.22%	+25.88%

Population statistic
Year	2024	2025
Count	1093	1099
Difference		+0.54%

It has a population of 1099 people (31 December 2025).

=== Ethnicity ===
Census 2021 (1+ %)
Ethnicity	Number	Fraction
Slovak	937	98.73%
Total	949	

In year 2021 was 949 people by ethnicity 937 as Slovak, 9 as Not found out, 7 as Czech, 5 as Hungarian, 3 as Ukrainian, 2 as Other, 1 as Irish and 1 as English.

Note on population: The difference values of population numbers in the table "Population statistic" and in the sections "Ethnicity" & "Religion" is caused by the use of various statistical methods.

=== Religion ===
Census 2021 (1+ %)
Religion	Number	Fraction
Roman Catholic Church	767	80.82%
None	138	14.54%
Not found out	25	2.63%
Total	949	

In year 2021 was 949 people by religion 767 from Roman Catholic Church, 138 from None, 25 from Not found out, 7 from Evangelical Church, 3 from Other, 2 from Jehovah's Witnesses, 2 from Ad hoc movements, 1 from Jewish community, 1 from Calvinist Church, 1 from Paganism and natural spirituality, 1 from Christian Congregations in Slovakia and 1 from Hinduism.
