= Lysica =

Village and municipality in Slovakia

- Municipality
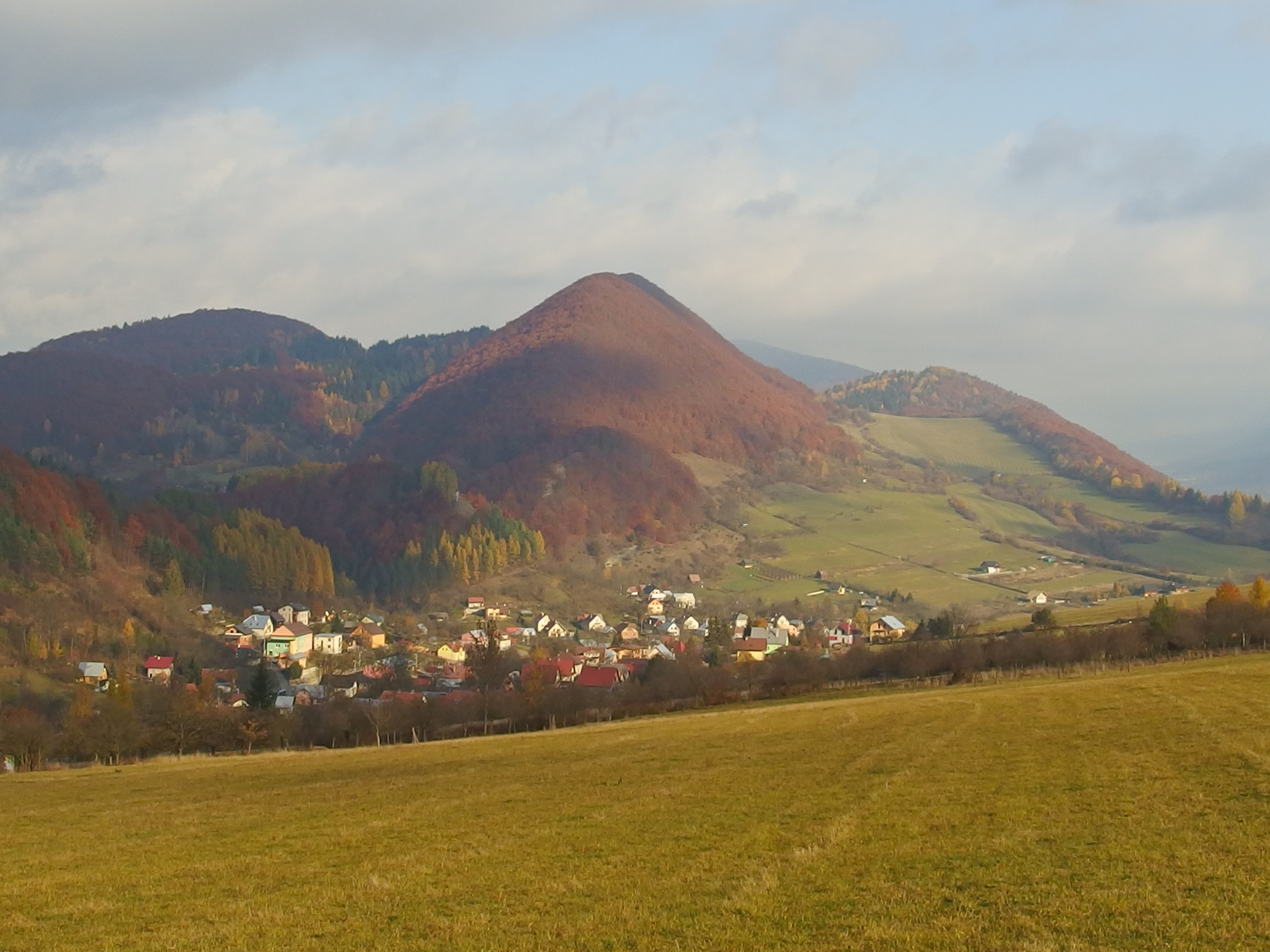

- Flag

- Location of Lysica in the Žilina Region Location of Lysica in Slovakia
- Coordinates: 49.25°N 18.92°E
- Country: Slovakia
- Region: Žilina Region
- District: Žilina District
- First mentioned: 1475

Area
  - Total: 15.52 km^{2} (5.99 sq mi)
- Elevation: 475 m (1,558 ft)

Population (2025)
  - Total: 896
- Time zone: UTC+1 (CET)
  - Summer (DST): UTC+2 (CEST)
- Postal code: 130 5
- Area code: +421 41
- Vehicle registration plate (until 2022): ZA

Lysica (Hungarian: Trencsénladány) is a village and municipality in Žilina District in the Žilina Region of northern Slovakia.

== History ==
In historical records the village was first mentioned in 1475.

== Geography ==
The municipality lies at an altitude of 475 metres (1,558 ft) and covers an area of 15.52 km^{2} (5.99 sq mi) (2025).

== Population ==
Population statistic (10 years)
| Year | 1995 | 2005 | 2015 | 2025 |
|---|---|---|---|---|
| Count | 912 | 865 | 835 | 896 |
| Difference | | −5.15% | −3.46% | +7.30% |

Population statistic
| Year | 2024 | 2025 |
|---|---|---|
| Count | 901 | 896 |
| Difference | | −0.55% |

It has a population of 896 people (31 December 2025).

=== Ethnicity ===
Census 2021 (1+ %)
| Ethnicity | Number | Fraction |
|---|---|---|
| Slovak | 855 | 98.16% |
| Not found out | 21 | 2.41% |
| Total | 871 | |

In year 2021 was 871 people by ethnicity 855 as Slovak, 21 as Not found out, 8 as Romani, 7 as Czech, 1 as Italian, 1 as Rusyn, 1 as Russian and 1 as Other.

Note on population: The difference values of population numbers in the table "Population statistic" and in the sections "Ethnicity" & "Religion" is caused by the use of various statistical methods.

=== Religion ===
Census 2021 (1+ %)
| Religion | Number | Fraction |
|---|---|---|
| Roman Catholic Church | 780 | 89.55% |
| None | 58 | 6.66% |
| Not found out | 13 | 1.49% |
| Total | 871 | |

In year 2021 was 871 people by religion 780 from Roman Catholic Church, 58 from None, 13 from Not found out, 5 from Christian Congregations in Slovakia, 5 from Other, 5 from Evangelical Church, 2 from Greek Catholic Church, 1 from Calvinist Church, 1 from Paganism and natural spirituality and 1 from Other and not ascertained christian church.
