= Lalinok =

Coordinates: 49°15′N 18°42′E

Lalinok Lalinek, Lányos
- Village
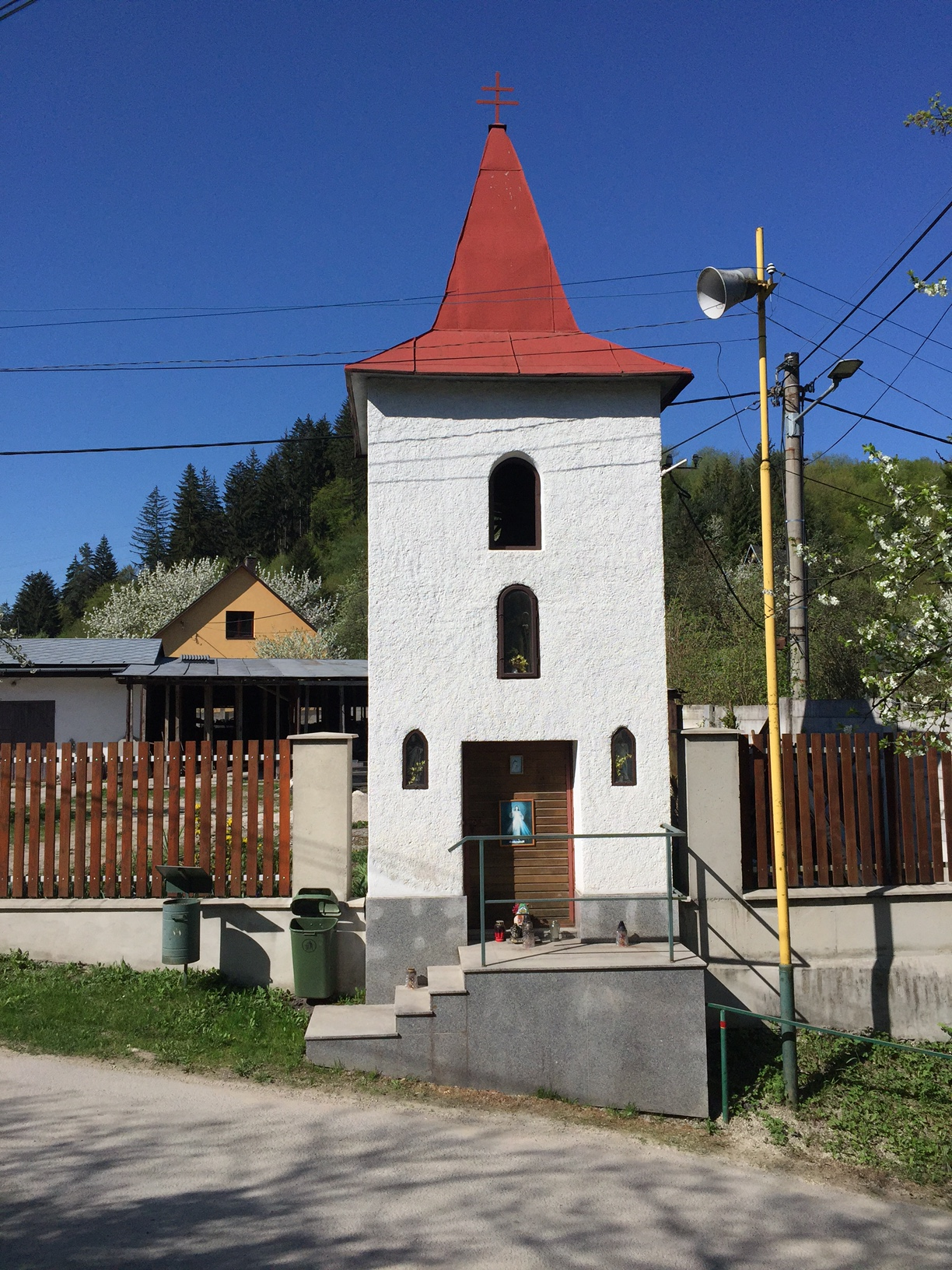
- Bell tower in Lalinok (Hôrka)

- Location within Slovakia
- Country: Slovakia
- Part of the village: Divinka

Population (2017)
  - Total: 509
- Website: http://divinka-lalinok.sk/

Lalinok (Hungarian: Lalinek) is a village (local part) in the administrative district of Divinka in northern Slovakia.

== History ==
The first written mention of Lalinok dates back to April 4, 1325, in the document dealing with the property transfers of the noble Borčický family, Lalinok is referred to as Lylihng. The earliest direct written record of Divinka is preserved in the letter of the Nitra Cathedral chapter (Latin: Capitulum Ecclesiae Nitriensis), dated to March 19, 1393. The Chapter announced not only King Sigismund of Luxembourg but all the villages of the Lietava estate, including Divinka (referred to as Kysdywyne) and Lalinok (referred to as Lelenk), too, that the new lawful overlord of Lietava castle and the estate had become Dezider from Kapla. From September 22, 1911 is Lalinok a part of Divinka village.

=== Historical names ===
- 1325 Lylihng
- 1387 Lelinek
- 1393 Lelenk
- 1395 Leleuch
- 1416 Lelenk
- 1438 Lalinka, Lelinka
- 1598 and 1853 Lalinek
- 1742 and 1800 Lalin
- 1927 Lalinek

== Monuments ==
- Walled cross from 1907 with the Art Nouveau elements.
- Small chapel dedicated to the Virgin Mary, coming from the late 19th century.
- Bell tower with the bell from 1819.
- Memorial dedicated to WWI victims from Lalinok village. The memorial is located at the local cemetery.
- Old wooden folk houses from the 19th and 20th century.
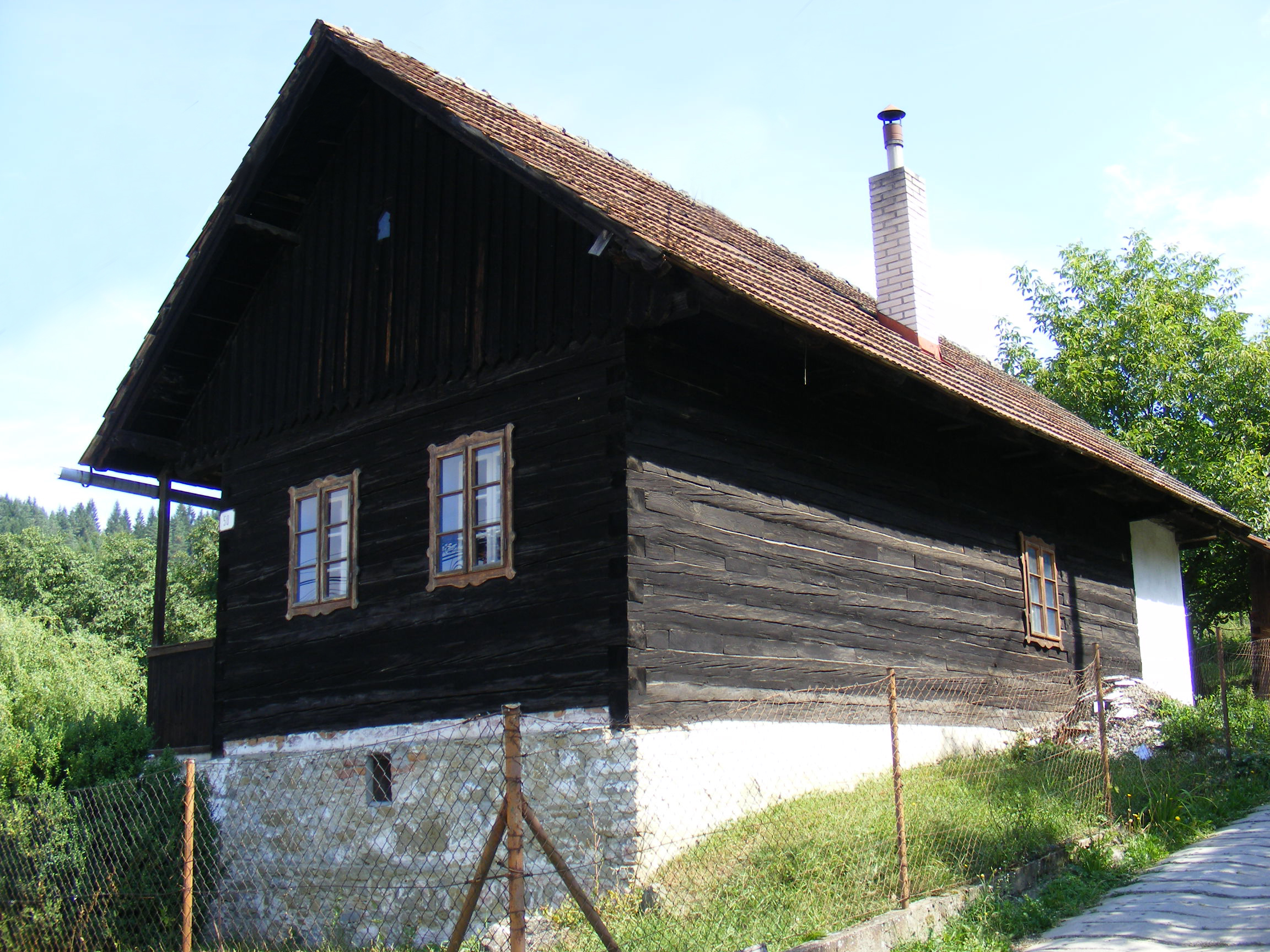
Typical folk house in Lalinok, 19th century

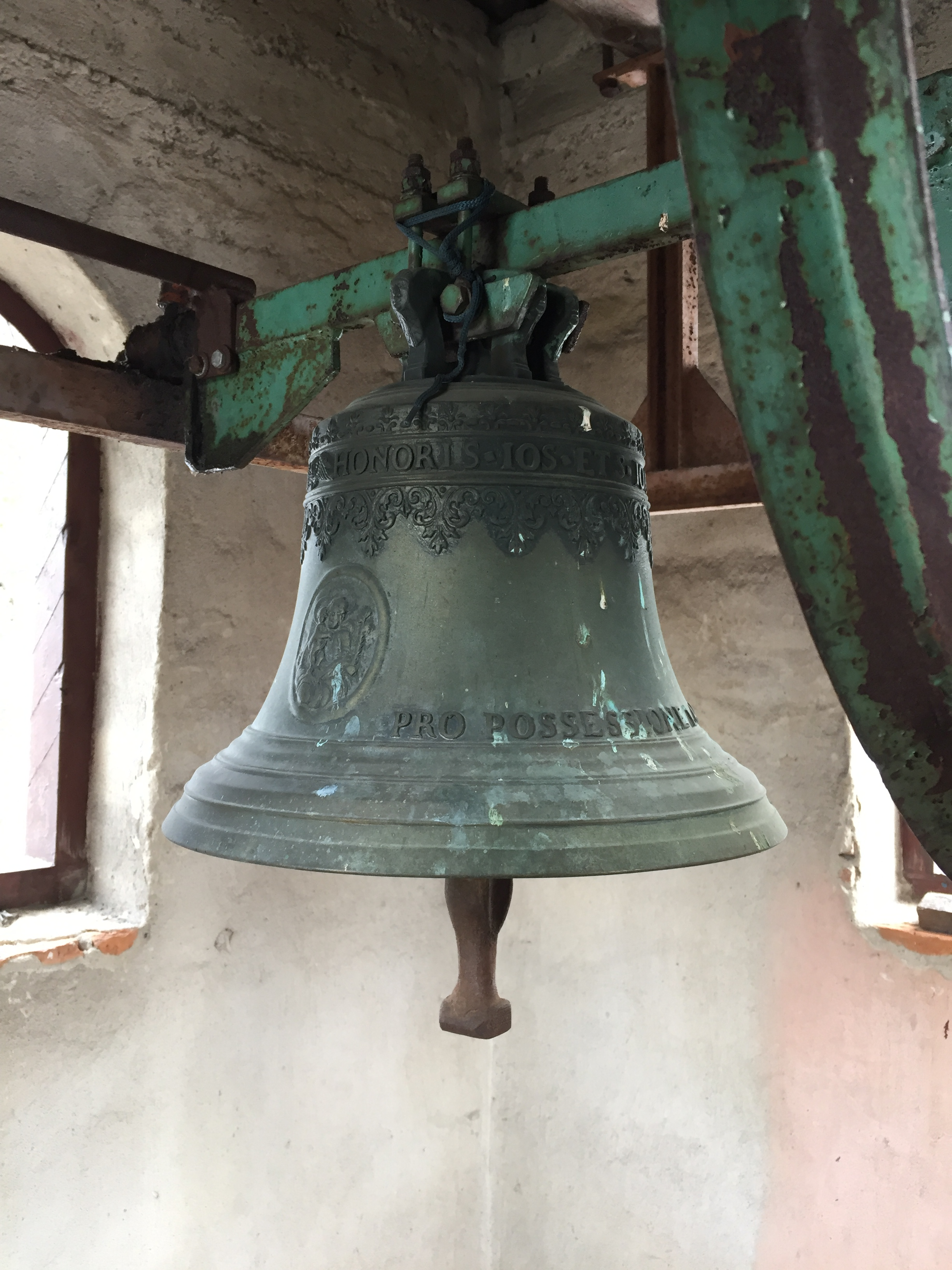
Bell in Lalinok from 1819

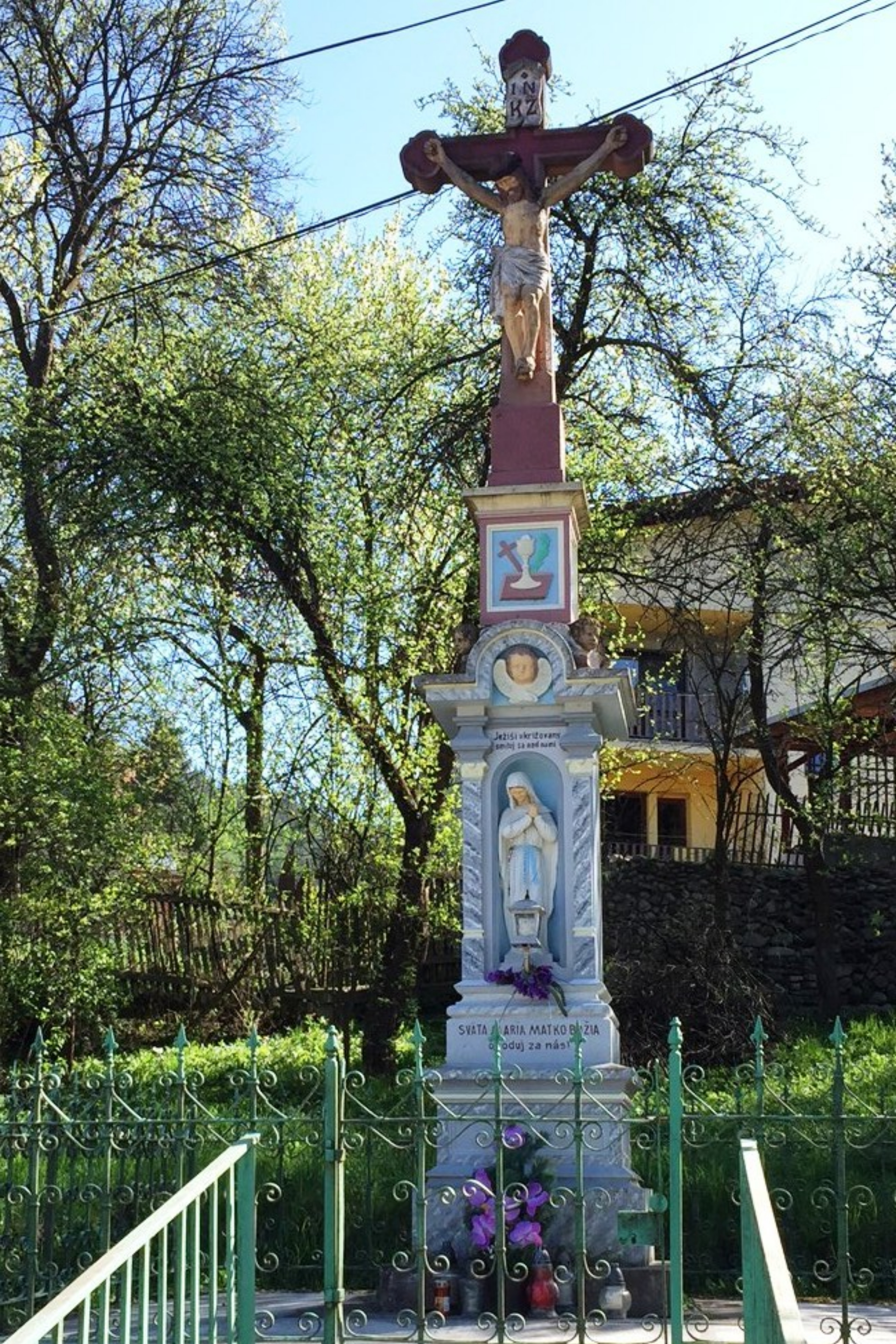
Art Nouveau cross from 1907

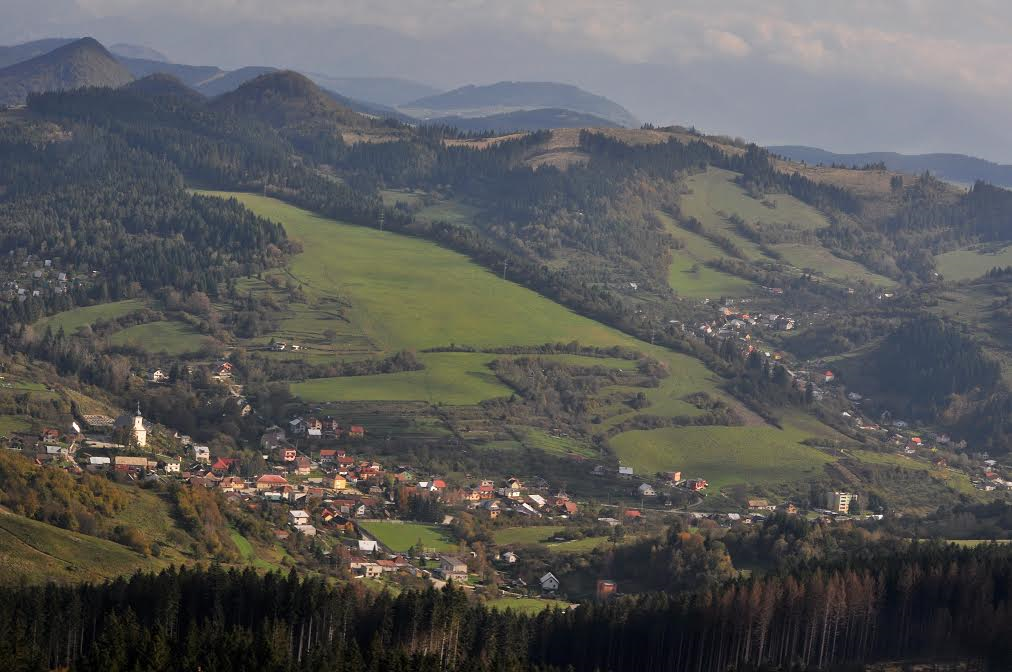
Aerial view of neighboring Divina (left) and Lalinok (right)

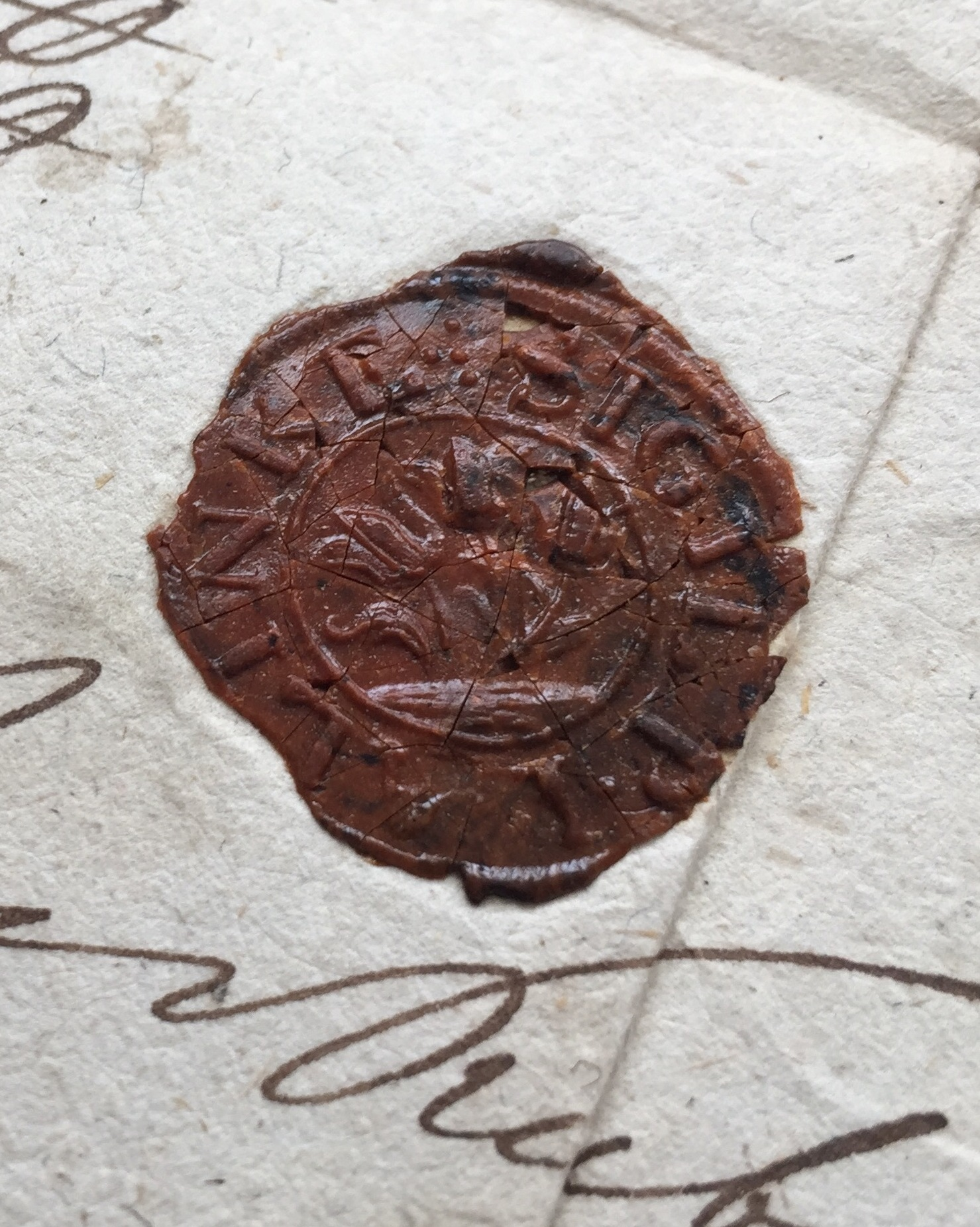
First seal of Lalinok, 18th Century
