= Divinka =

Divinka Kis Divina, Klein Divina
- Village
- Obec Divinka
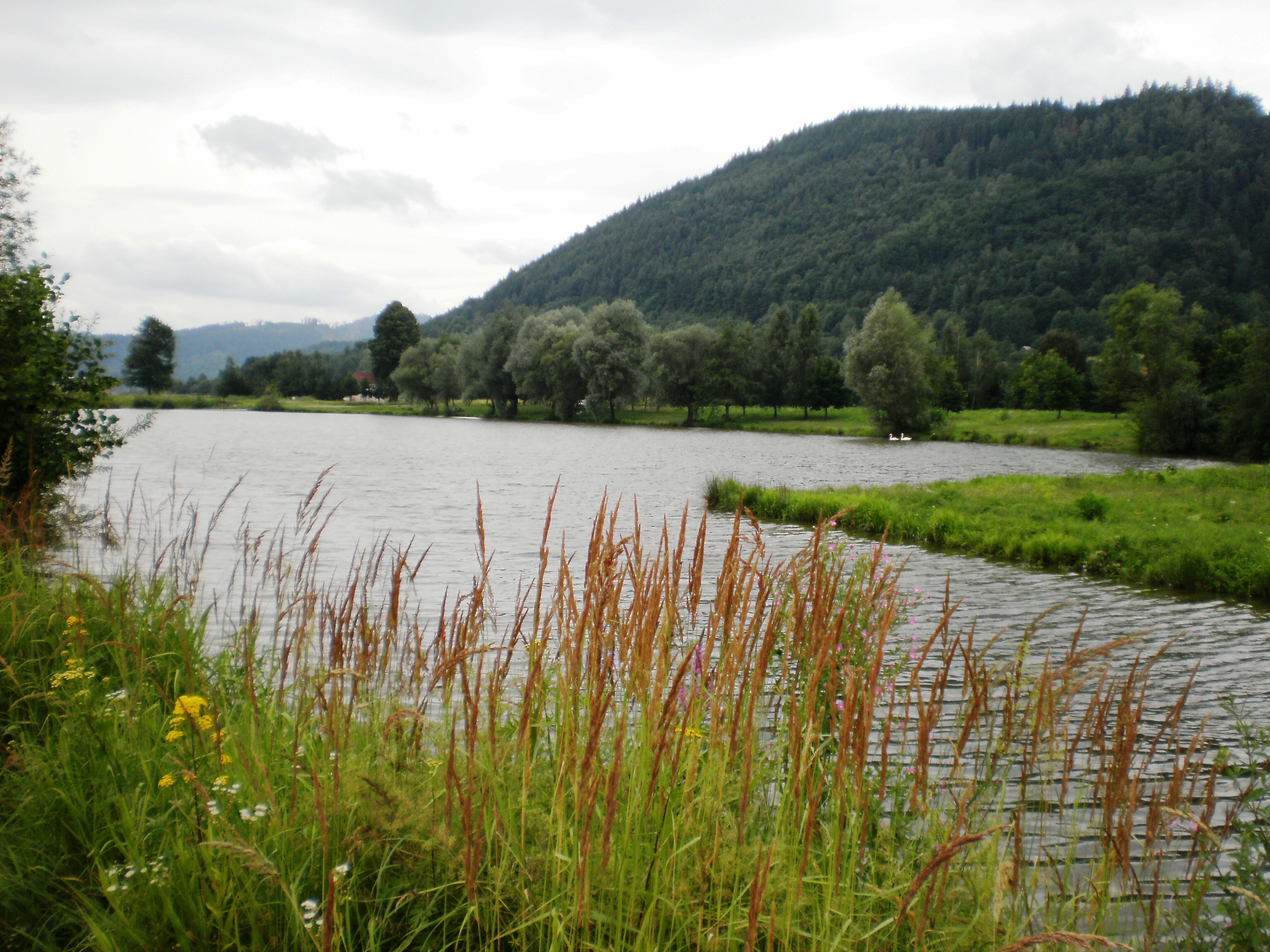
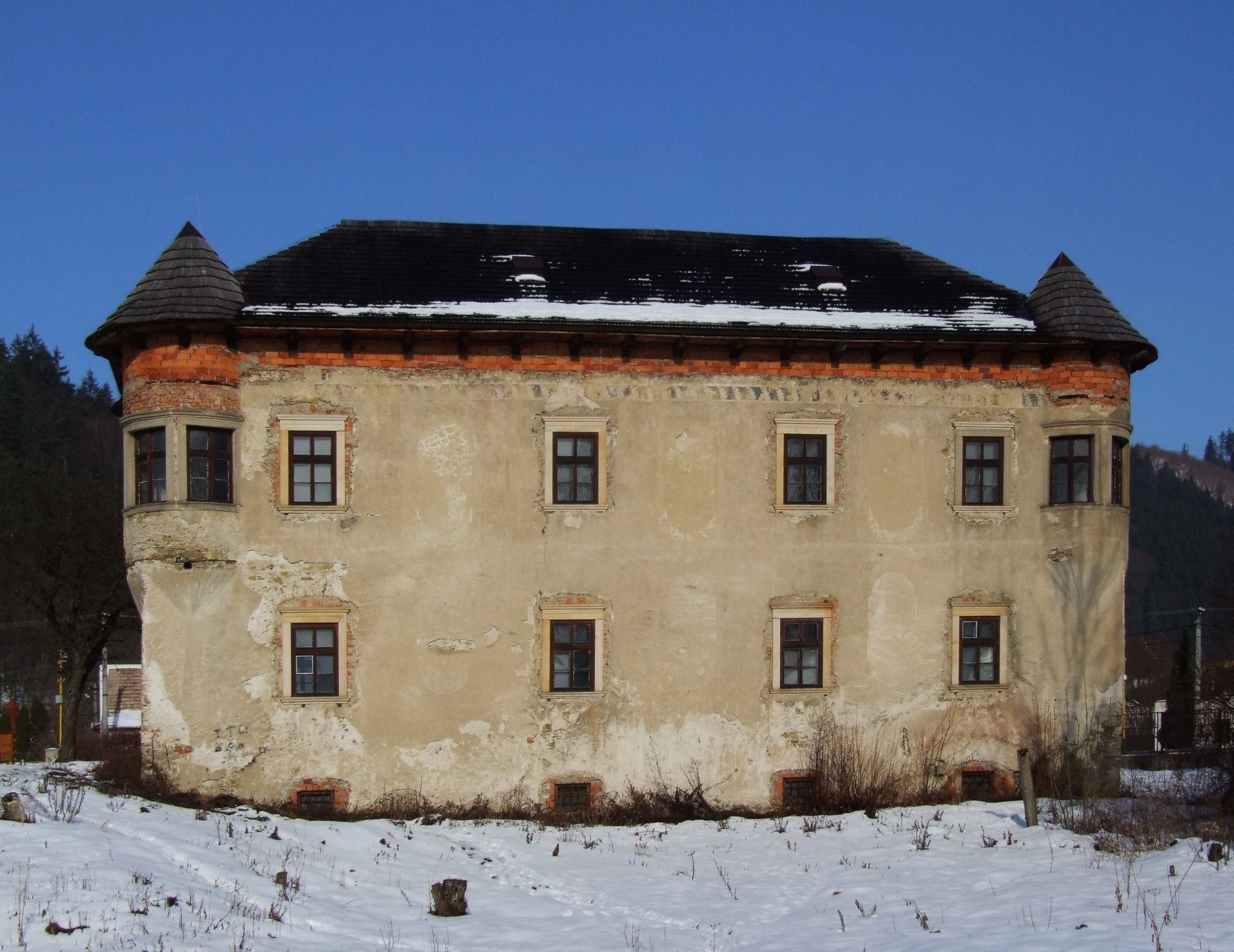
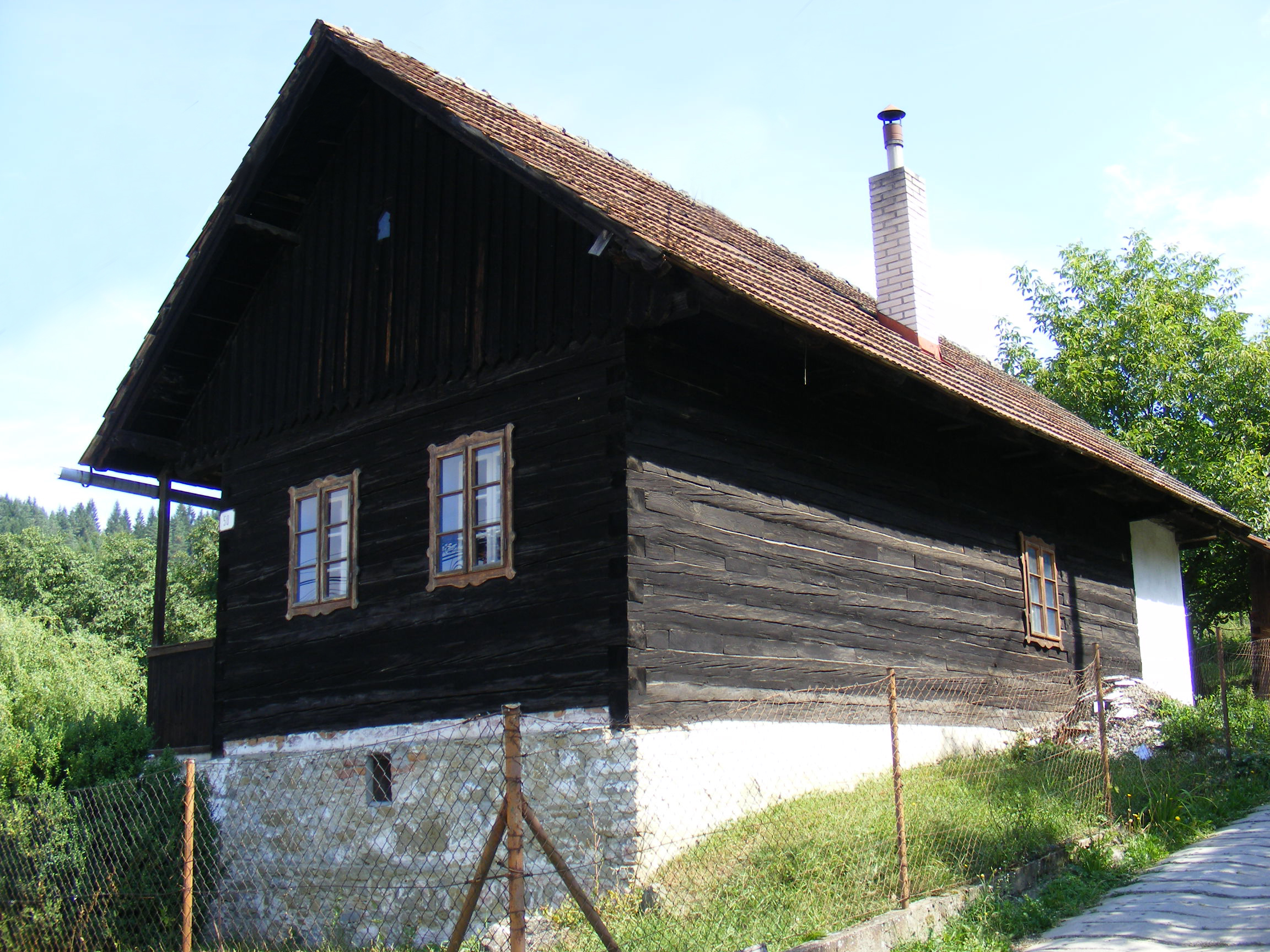
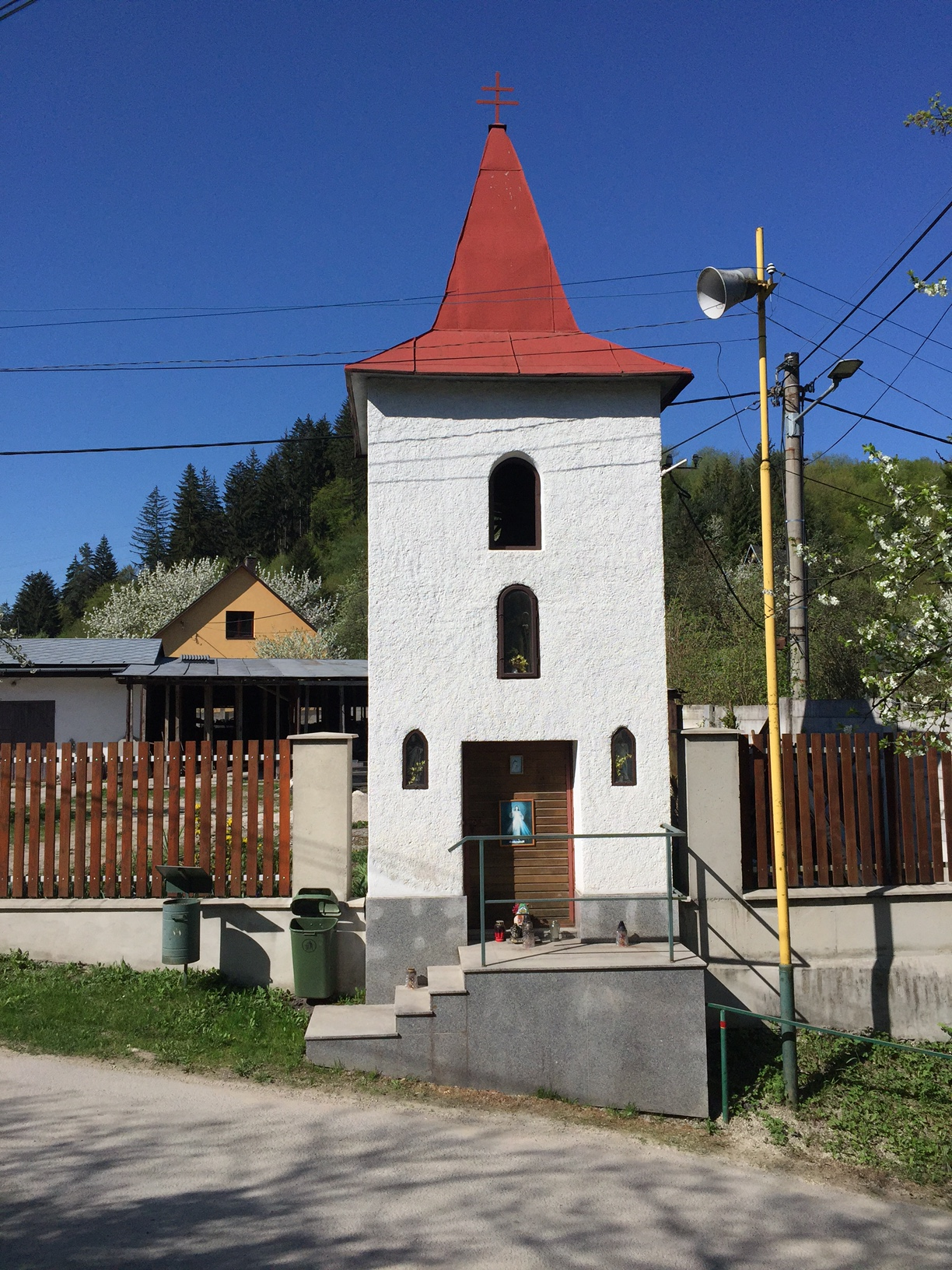
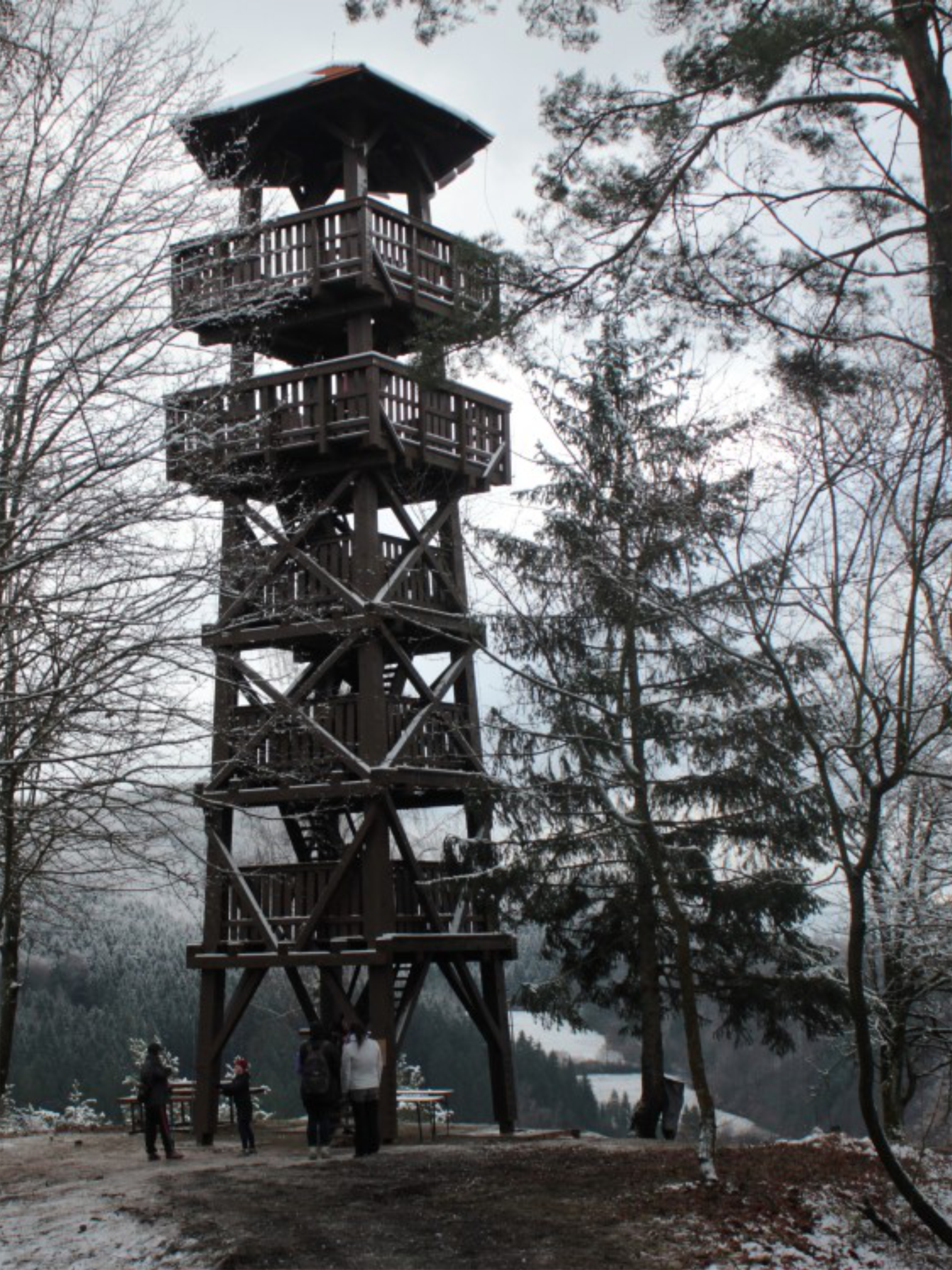
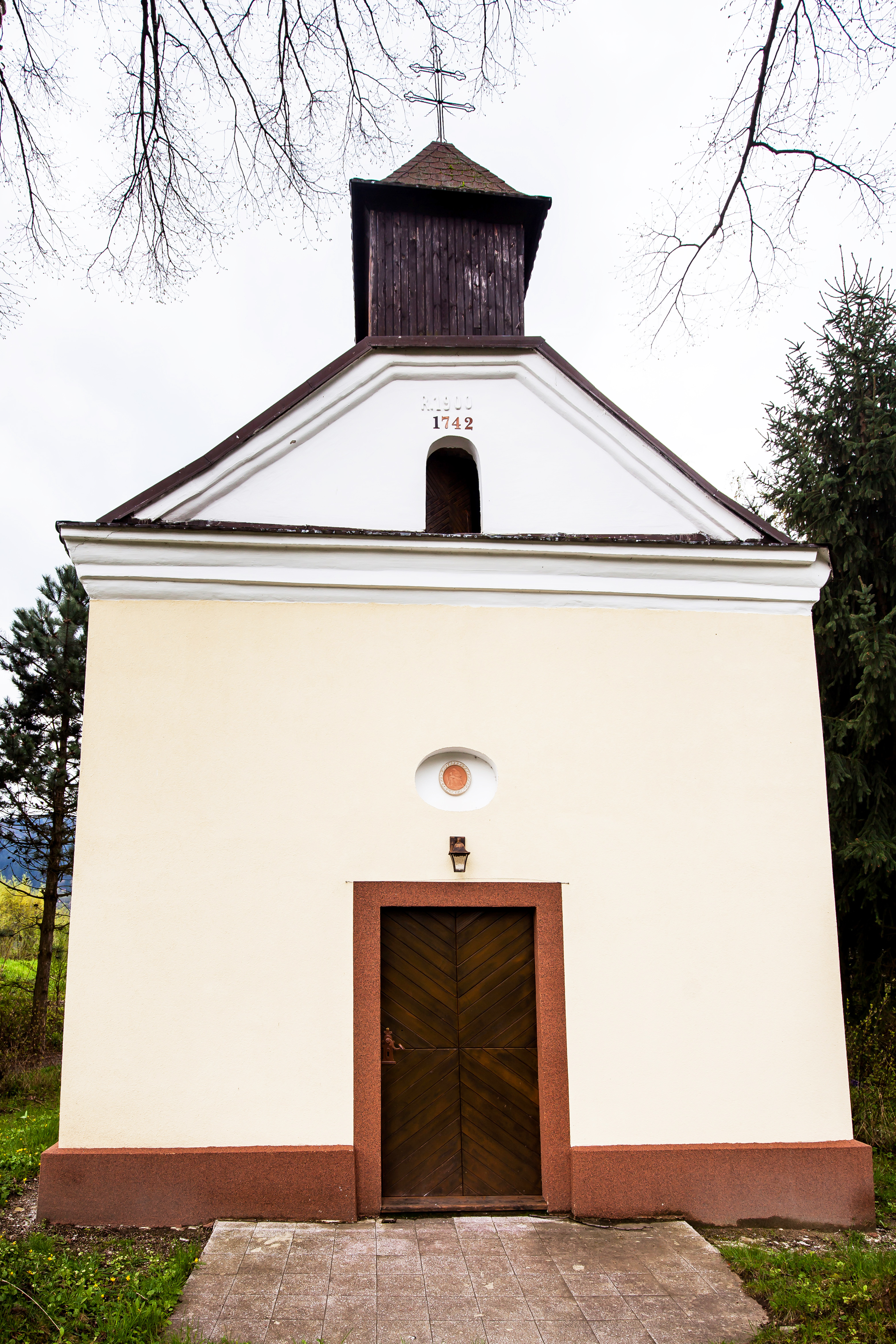
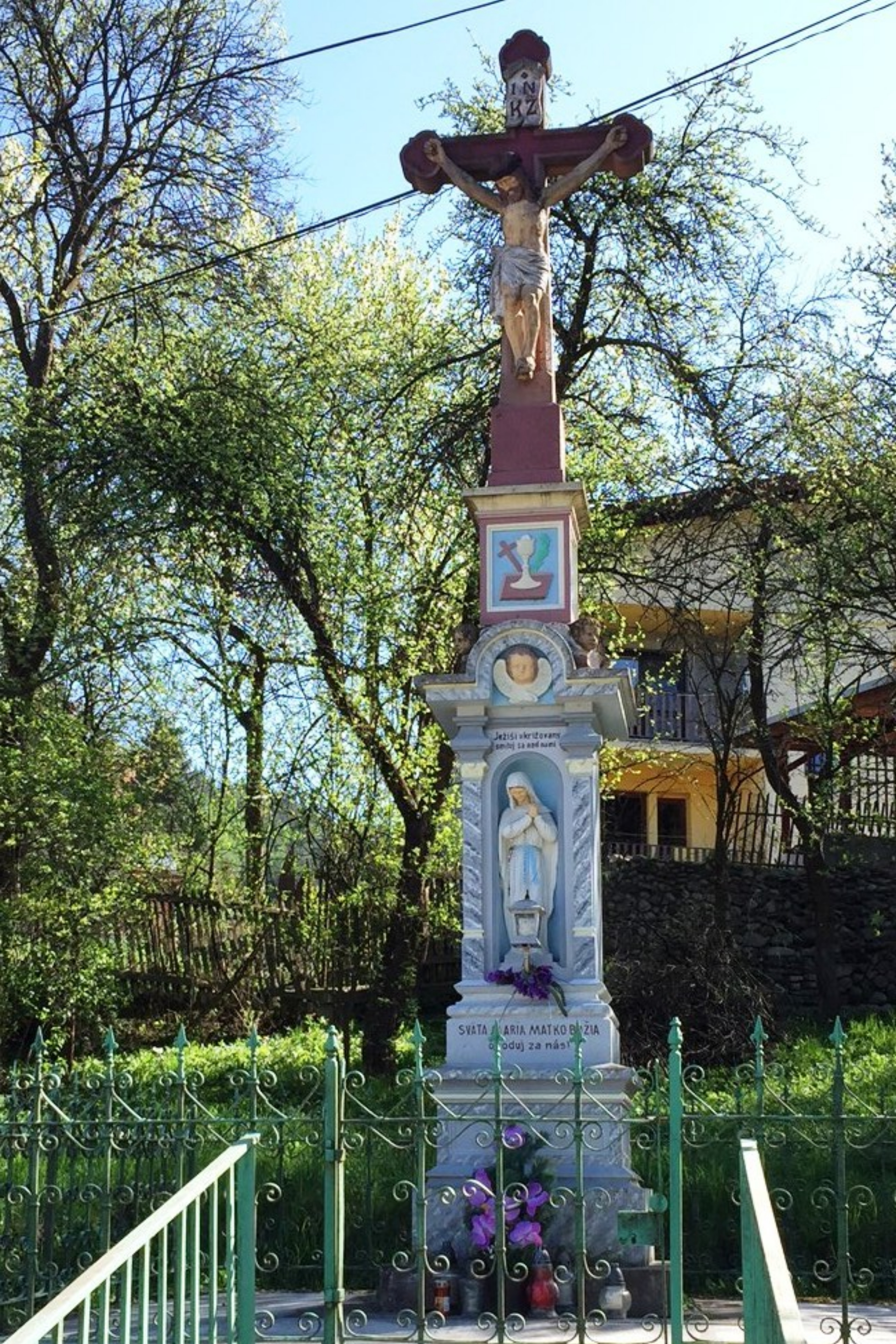
- Clockwise from top: Lake in Divinka; Folk house in Lalinok; Observation tower in Divinka; Art Nouveau cross in Lalinok; Chapel of St. John of Nepomuk in Divinka; Bell tower in Lalinok; Mansion in Divinka

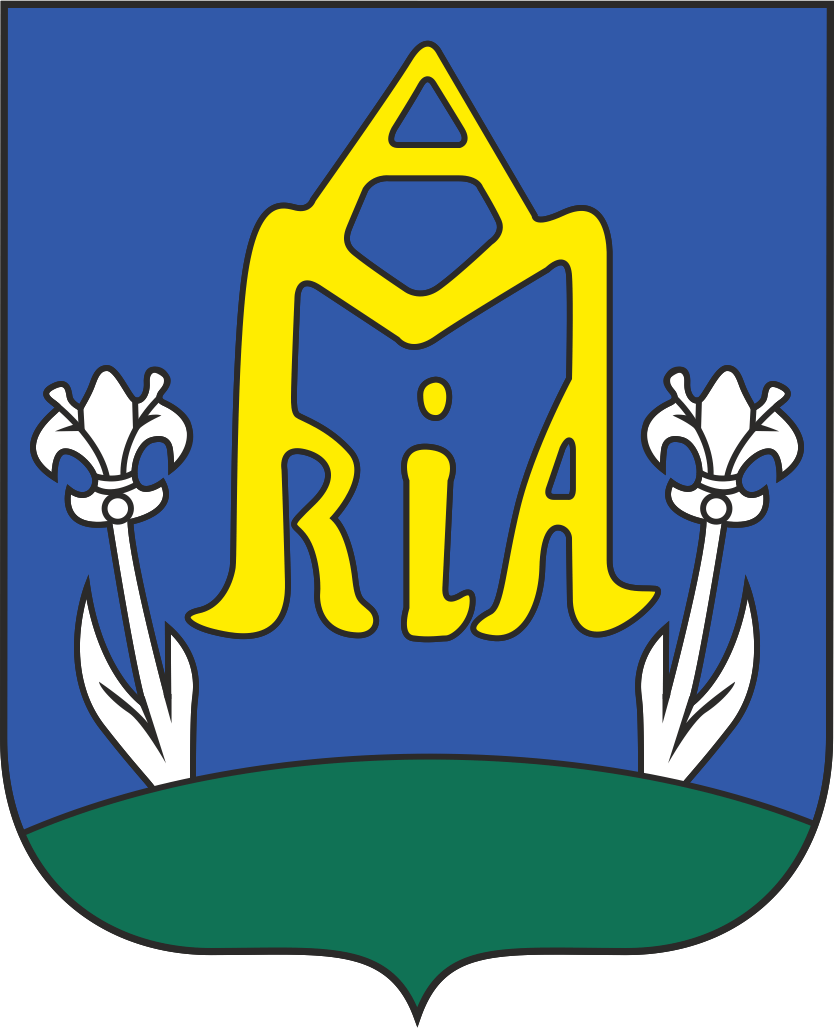
- Flag Coat of arms

- Location of Divinka in the Žilina Region Location of Divinka in Slovakia
- Coordinates: 49°15′13″N 18°41′57″E
- Country: Slovakia
- Region: Žilina Region
- District: Žilina District
- First mentioned: 1393

Government
  - starosta: Michal Krško, Independent

Area
  - Total: 5.17 km^{2} (2.00 sq mi)
- Elevation: 388 m (1,273 ft)

Population (2025)
  - Total: 1,021
- Time zone: UTC+1 (CET)
  - Summer (DST): UTC+2 (CEST)
- Postal code: 133 1
- Area code: +421 41
- Vehicle registration plate (until 2022): ZA
- Website: www.divinka-lalinok.sk

Divinka (Hungarian: Kisdivény) is a village and municipality in Žilina District in the Žilina Region of northern Slovakia.

== History ==
The modern village of Divinka consists of two parts, which were originally two separate villages: Divinka (former Malá Divina) and Lalinok, which merged in 1911. During the Austro-Hungarian period, the village was a part of Trencsén County and belonged to the district of Kysucké Nové Mesto. The Veľký Vrch hill was fortified with ramparts of a vast hillfort, that rise up majestically above the village Divinka, which, thanks to its strategic location, has been inhabited since ancient times. This place, which gave many important testimonies of settlement in the times long before the first written mention of Divinka or Lalinok, is today a well-known cultural, historical and natural site. The castle occupies an area of approximately 12 hectares. Pieces of ceramics, iron, bronze and gold objects have been found there. The most famous discovery is the Celtic coin type "Divinka".

The first written mention of Lalinok dates back to April 4, 1325, in the document dealing with the property transfers of the noble Borčický family, Lalinok is referred to as Lylihng. The earliest direct written record of Divinka is preserved in the letter of the Nitra Cathedral chapter (Latin: Capitulum Ecclesiae Nitriensis), dated to March 19, 1393. The Chapter announced not only King Sigismund of Luxembourg but all the villages of the Lietava estate, including Divinka (referred to as Kysdywyne) and Lalinok (referred to as Lelenk), too, that the new lawful overlord of Lietava castle and the estate had become Dezider from Kapla.

Local residents have retained traditional folk costumes as well as dialect, but they are no longer worn. In the middle of the 19th century, divinity and tinker trade were the two most widespread crafts. A typical feature of this region was emigration. Local people traveled to the United States, Belgium, Denmark, and Germany to work there.

== Geography ==
The municipality lies at an altitude of 388 metres (1,273 ft) and covers an area of 5.17 km^{2} (2.00 sq mi) (2025).

== Population ==
Population statistic (10 years)
Year	1995	2005	2015	2025
Count	797	873	1051	1021
Difference		+9.53%	+20.38%	−2.85%

Population statistic
Year	2024	2025
Count	1015	1021
Difference		+0.59%

It has a population of 1021 people (31 December 2025).

=== Ethnicity ===
Census 2021 (1+ %)
Ethnicity	Number	Fraction
Slovak	994	97.26%
Not found out	25	2.44%
Czech	11	1.07%
Total	1022	

In year 2021 was 1022 people by ethnicity 994 as Slovak, 25 as Not found out, 11 as Czech, 9 as Polish, 6 as Other, 2 as Hungarian, 1 as Rusyn, 1 as German and 1 as Canadian.

Note on population: The difference values of population numbers in the table "Population statistic" and in the sections "Ethnicity" & "Religion" is caused by the use of various statistical methods.

=== Religion ===
Census 2021 (1+ %)
Religion	Number	Fraction
Roman Catholic Church	826	80.82%
None	151	14.77%
Not found out	20	1.96%
Evangelical Church	11	1.08%
Total	1022	

In year 2021 was 1022 people by religion 826 from Roman Catholic Church, 151 from None, 20 from Not found out, 11 from Evangelical Church, 4 from Christian Congregations in Slovakia, 4 from Greek Catholic Church, 2 from Other, 1 from Calvinist Church, 1 from Eastern Orthodox Church, 1 from Islam and 1 from Ad hoc movements.

== Religion ==
=== Roman Catholic Church ===
The village has a strong Roman Catholic tradition. From the point of view of church autonomy, Divinka and Lalinok have never formed a separate parish. They have always been in the administration of other parishes since their creation. The municipalities alternately belonged to the Parish district Dolný Hričov or Kysucké Nové Mesto. After the establishment of a separate parish in the nearby village called Divina (former Veľká Divina) in 1771, Divinka and Lalinok joined it. Today, the village belongs to the administration of the Diocese of Žilina.

=== Judaism ===
An integral part of the history and demography of Divinka and Lalinok was also the Jewish ethnicity. The Jews moved to Divinka and Lalinok sometime in the first half of the 19th century and devoted themselves to timber trade and tavern services. The Jews left voluntarily later in 1918, after selling out their possessions to local residents.

== Monuments ==
=== Divinka ===
- Former Ancient fortress Veľký vrch – Archaeological site registered in the Central List of the Slovak Memorial Fund.
- Renaissance Suňogs´ mansion from the 16th century. Mansion is registered in the Central List of the Slovak Memorial Fund.
- Chapel of St. John of Nepomuk from 1742, which was built by Agnes Suňog. Chapel is registered in the Central List of the Slovak Memorial Fund.
- St. Anna's Chapel at the local cemetery, which was built in the middle of the 18th century by Steven Višňovský.
- Observation tower in Malý vrch.

=== Lalinok ===
- Walled cross from 1907 with the Art Nouveau elements.
- Small chapel dedicated to the Virgin Mary, coming from the late 19th century.
- Bell tower with the bell from 1819.
- Memorial dedicated to WWI victims from Lalinok village. The memorial is located at the local cemetery.

In Lalinok, old wooden folk houses from the 19th century have been preserved. A single track railway, which does not exist anymore, was the curiosity of Lalinok. It was used to transport material from the stone quarry in Divinka to construct the county road from Budatín to Kotešová. In the past, there were two mills in Divinka, one of which is now used as the Municipal office building.

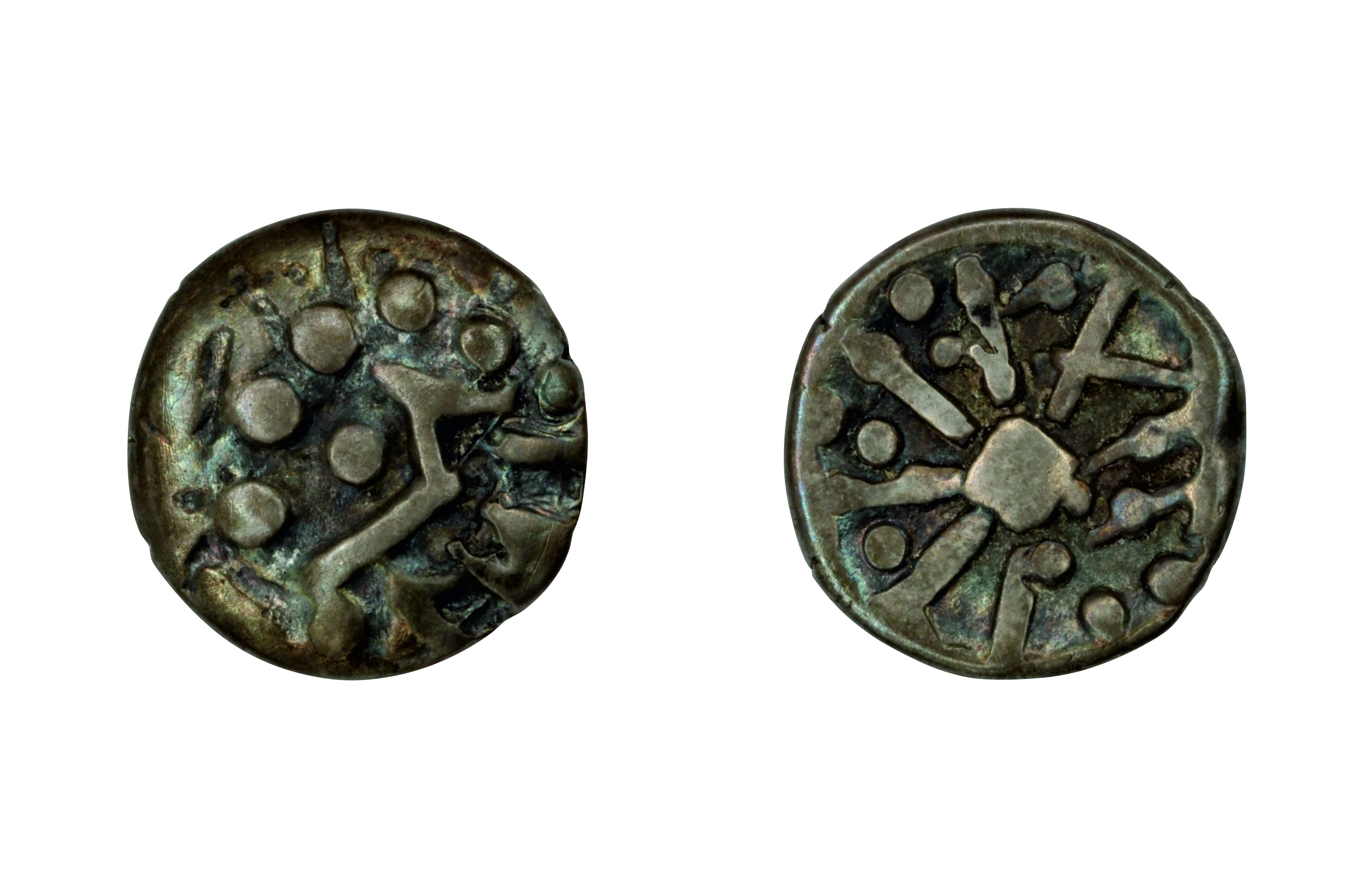
Celtic coin type "Divinka"

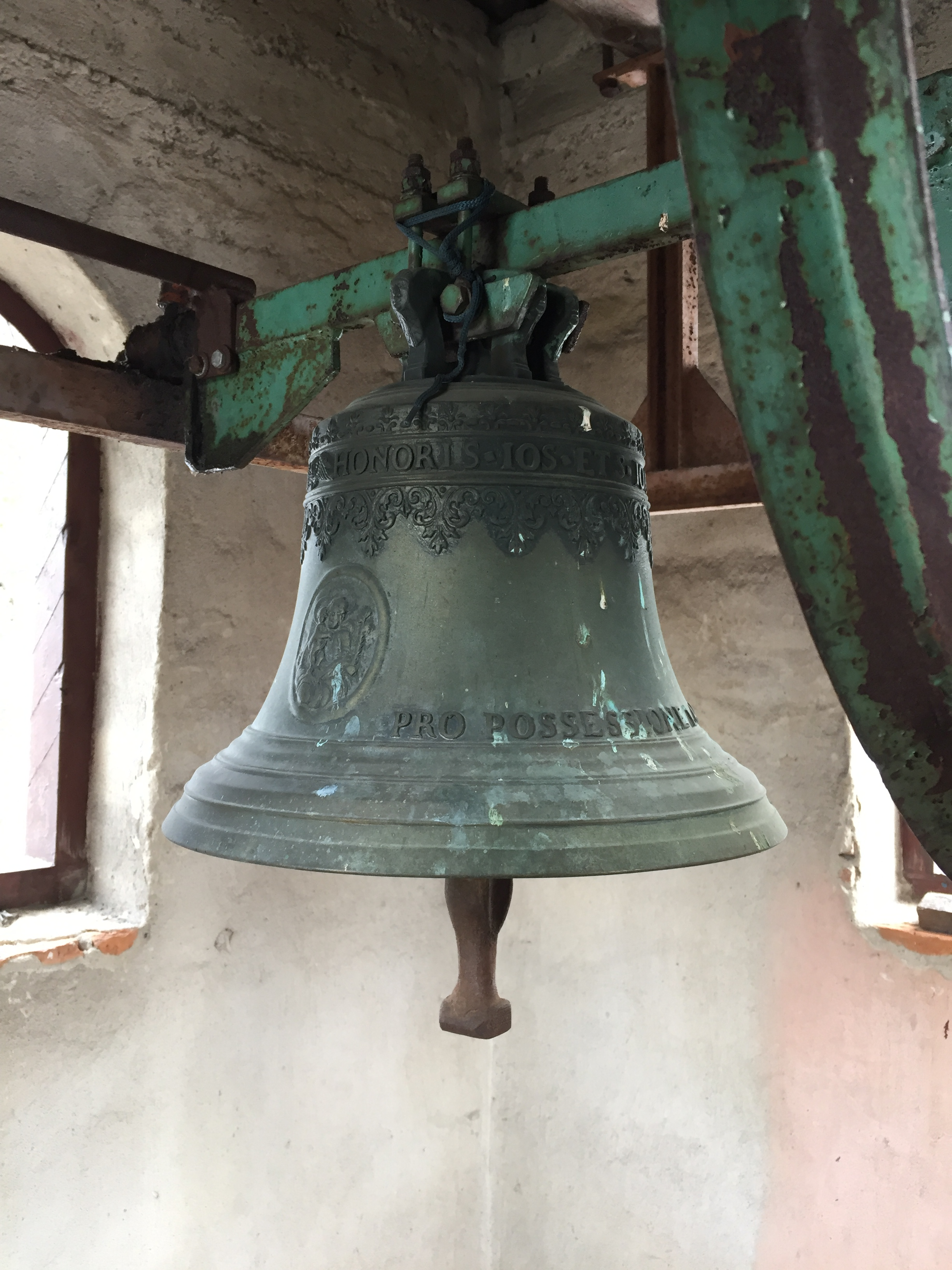
Bell from 1819 in bell tower in Lalinok

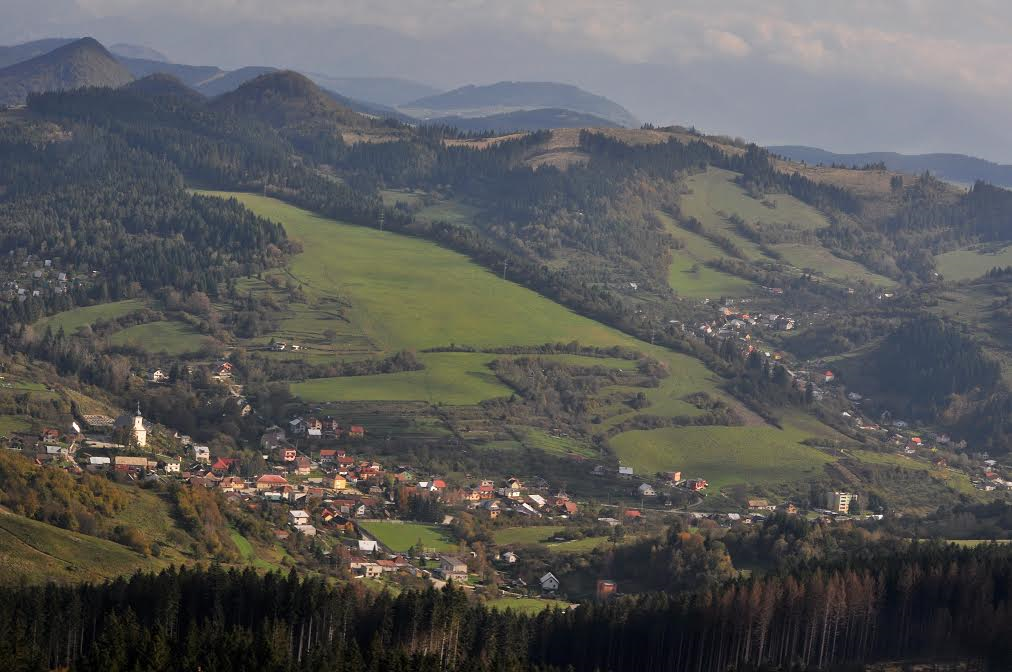
Aerial view of neighboring Divina (left) and Lalinok (right)

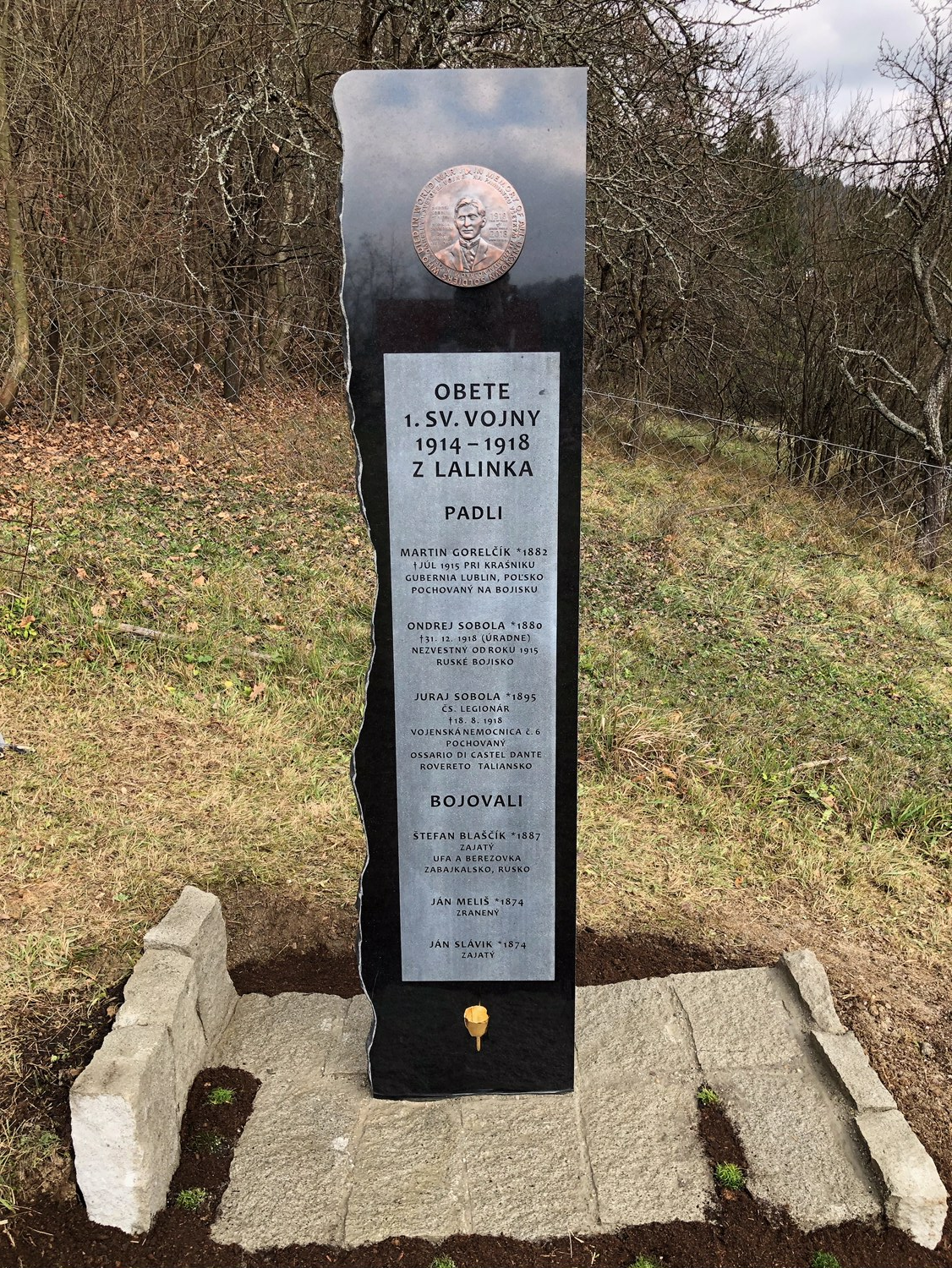
WWI Memorial in Lalinok

== Genealogical resources ==
The records for genealogical research are available at the state archive "Štátny archív v Žiline so sídlom v Bytči".

- Roman Catholic church records (births/marriages/deaths): 1690 – 1898 (parish B)

== Sport ==
Ski jumping is the most popular among sporting activities, locally. The origin of the skiing sport in Lalinok can be dated to 1940. Legendary were also the biking races that arose in 1991 and had a long tradition in the village. Like everywhere in the surrounding villages, Divinka and Lalinok have their own football history. At first football was played on natural playing fields with handball balls while the cattle grazed. Since 1939, Easter football tournaments have been played in nearby Svederník. Today there is a large football field in Divinka.

== Significant natives ==
- Vojtech Križan Sr. (* May 1, 1908 Rajec – † April 30, 1975 Divinka) was a prominent beekeeper – expert, the author of professional literature, and an innovator. After Vojtech Križan became the caretaker and later headmaster of the elementary school in the village in 1940, bee-keeping increased in popularity, with Divinka becoming the destination for visitors and beekeeping specialists from all over Slovakia. Beekeeping also has a long tradition in the village, with the first records of beekeepers going back to the early 20th century. He and his wife Valéria worked as teachers at the local school for a long time.
- Martin Medňanský (* November 10, 1840 – † November 3, 1899). Medňanský was a member of the noble family and he was a Catholic priest, poet, translator, and journalist.

== See also ==
- List of municipalities and towns in Slovakia
