= Celtic coinage =

Currency

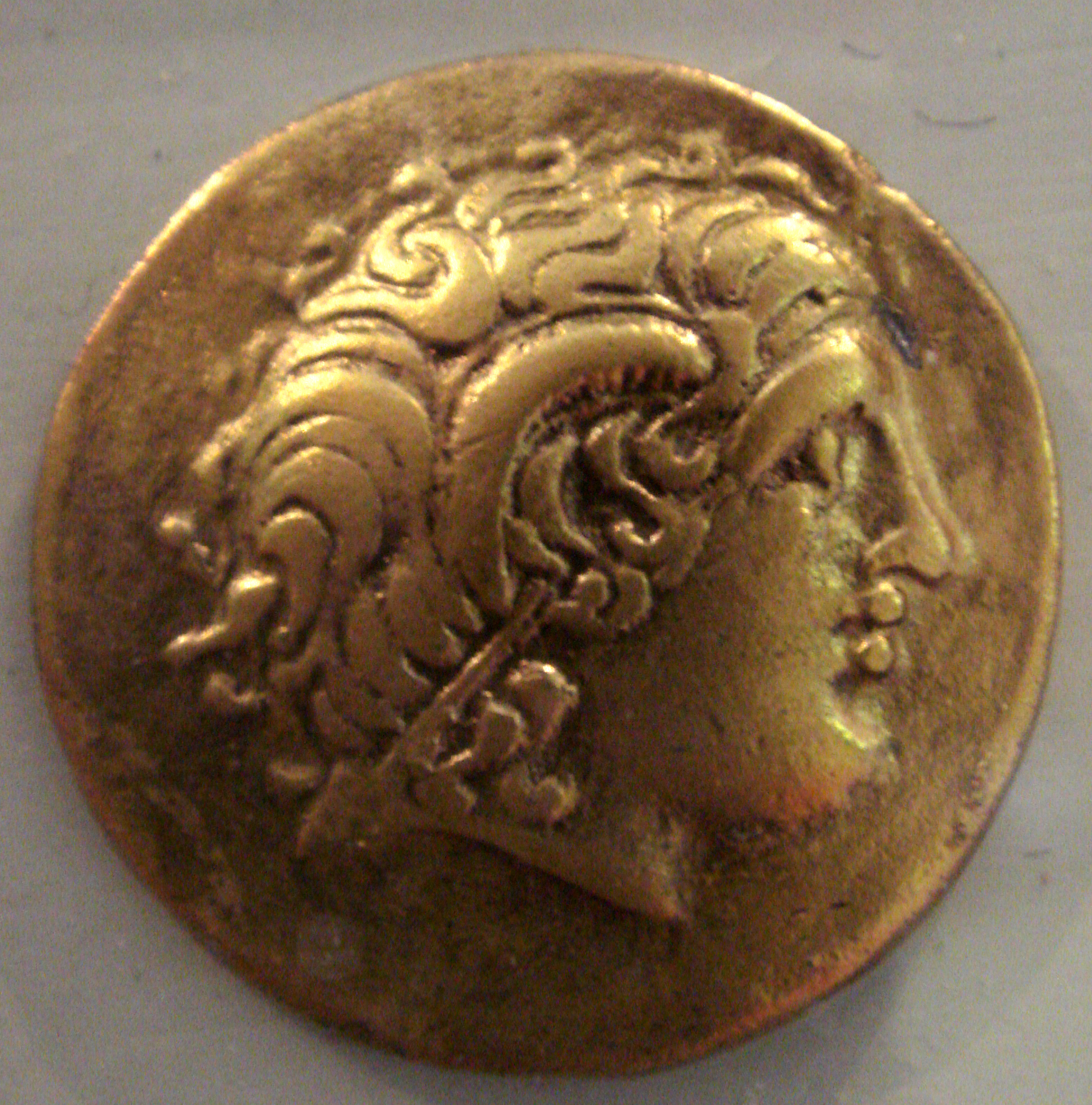
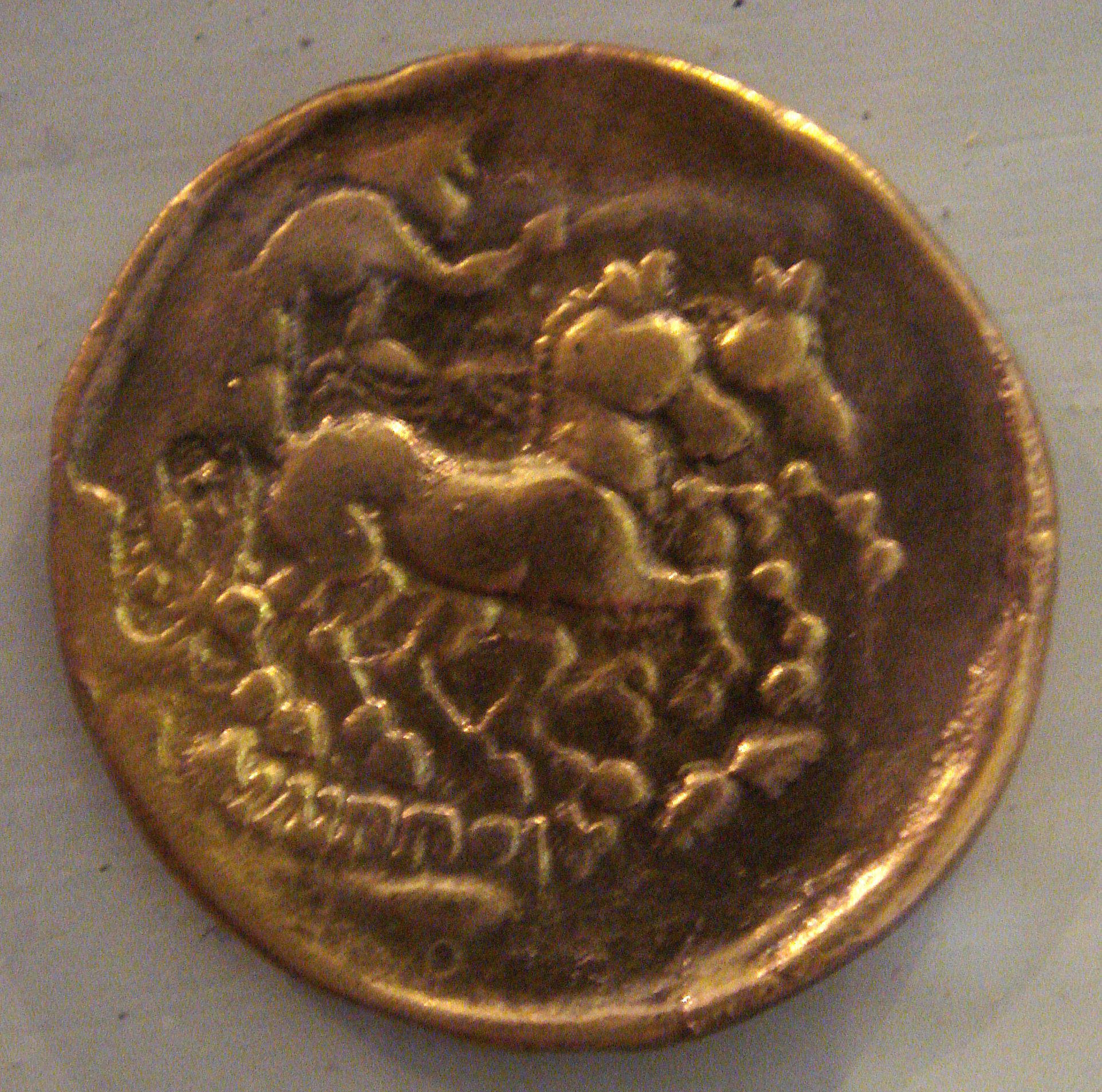
Gold coins of the Sequani Gauls, 5-1st century BCE. Early Gaul coins were often inspired by Greek coinage.

Celtic coinage was minted by the Celts from the late 4th century BC to the mid 1st century AD. Celtic coins were influenced by trade with and the supply of mercenaries to the Greeks, and initially copied Greek designs, especially Macedonian coins from the time of Philip II and his son, Alexander the Great. Thus Greek motifs and even letters can be found on various Celtic coins, especially those of southern France.

The images found on Celtic coins include horsemen charging into battle, wheels, thunderbolts and lightning, the sun and the moon.

== Gaulish coinage ==
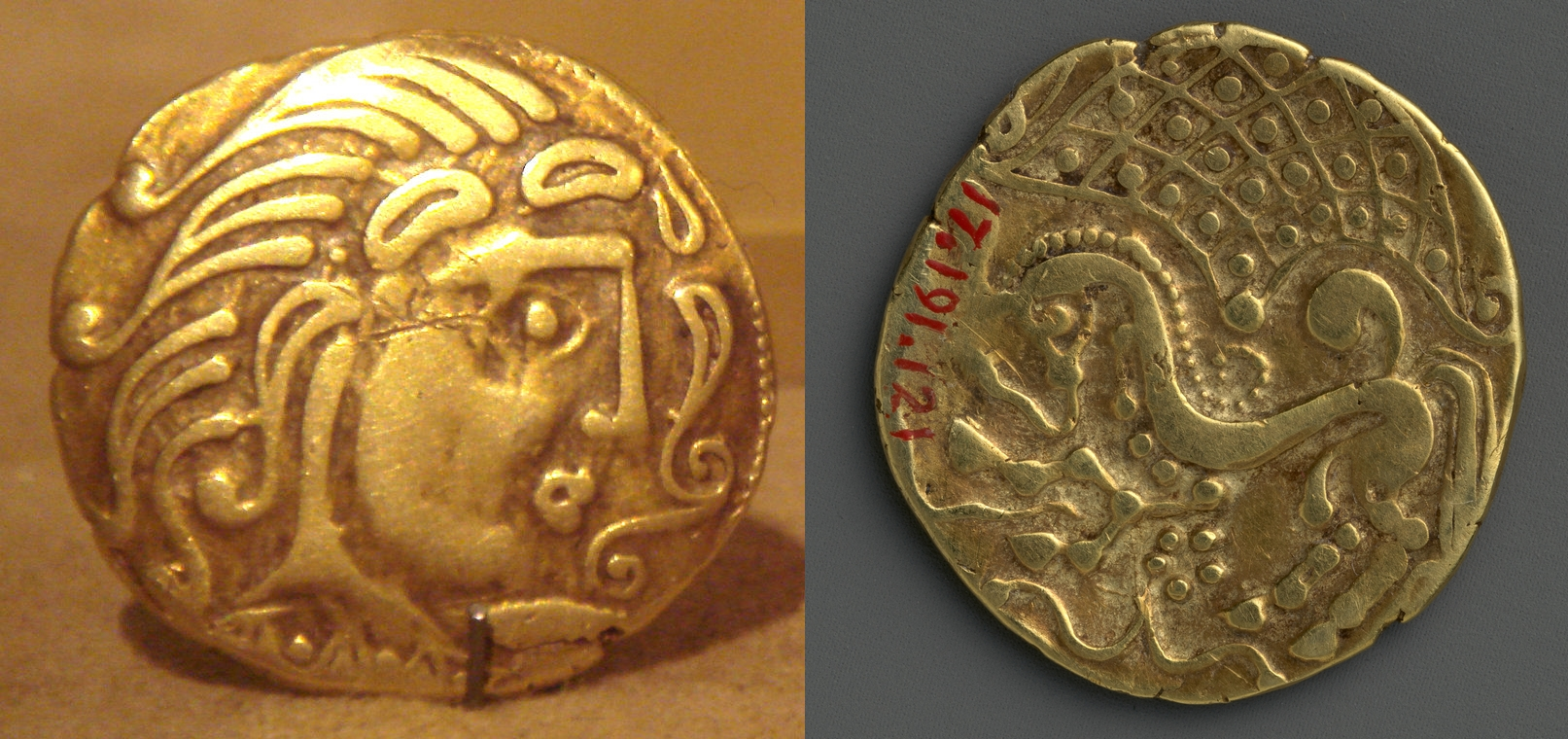
Celtic coin designs progressively became more abstract as exemplified by the coins of the Parisii.

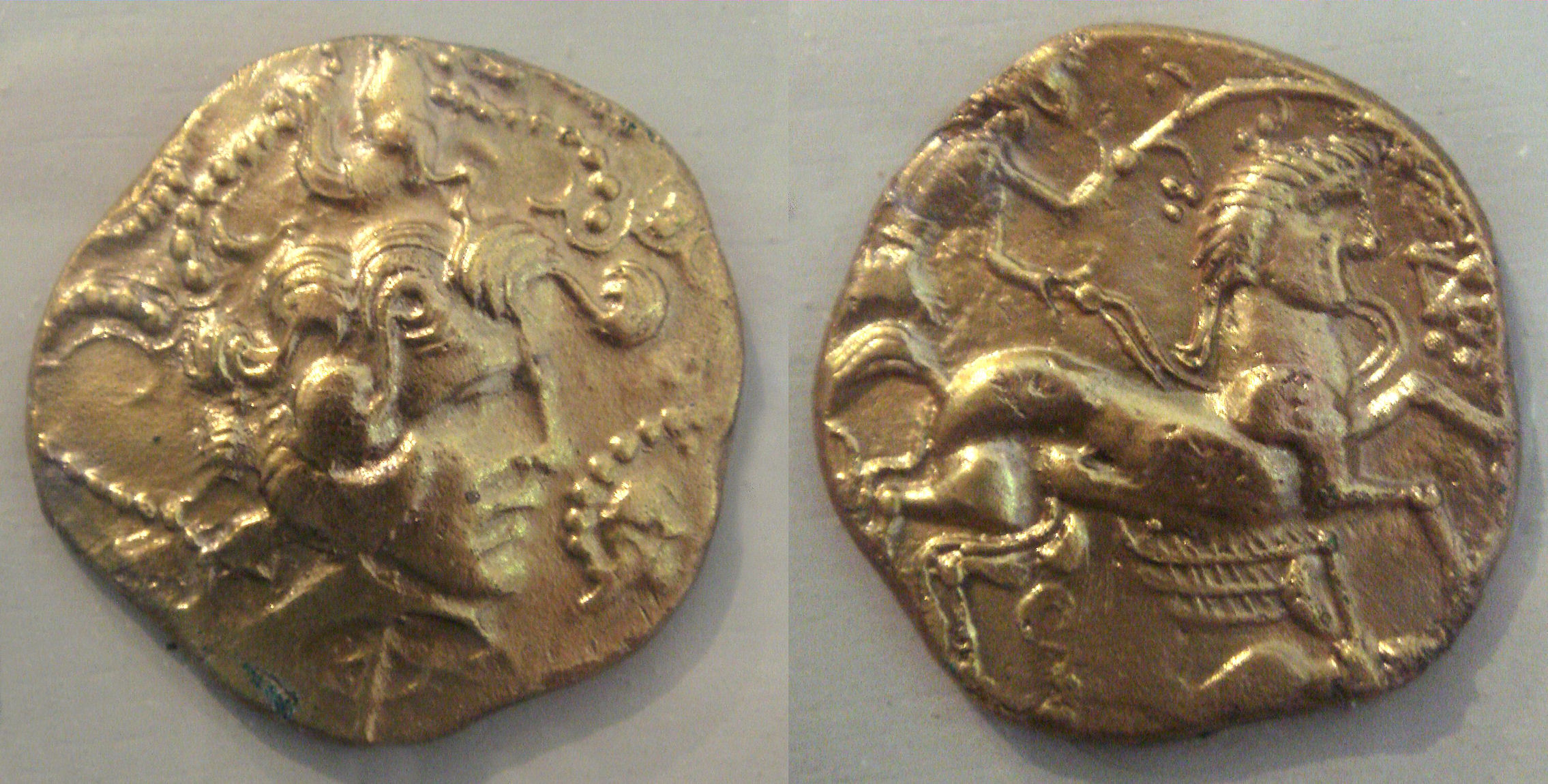
Coins of the Veneti, 5th-1st century BCE.

Greek coinage occurred in three Greek cities of Massalia, Emporiae and Rhoda, and was copied throughout southern Gaul.

Northern Gaulish coins were especially influenced by the coinage of Philip II of Macedon and his famous son Alexander the Great. Celtic coins often retained Greek subjects, such as the head of Apollo on the obverse and two-horse chariot on the reverse of the gold stater of Philip II, but developed their own style from that basis, allowing for the development of a Graeco-Celtic synthesis.

After this first period in which Celtic coins rather faithfully reproduced Greek types, designs started to become more symbolic, as exemplified by the coinage of the Parisii in the Belgic region of northern France.

The Armorican Celtic style in northwestern Gaul also developed from Celtic designs from the Rhine valley, themselves derived from earlier Greek prototypes such as the wine scroll and split palmette.

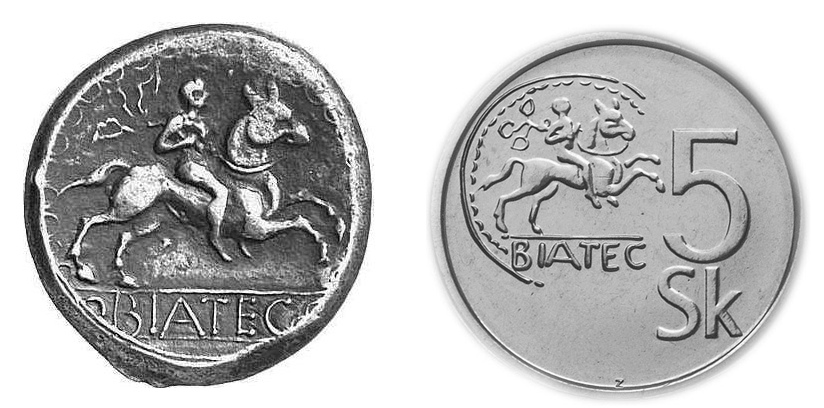
An original Biatec and its replica on a modern 5-koruna coin, which was in use until Slovakia joined the euro zone on January 1, 2009

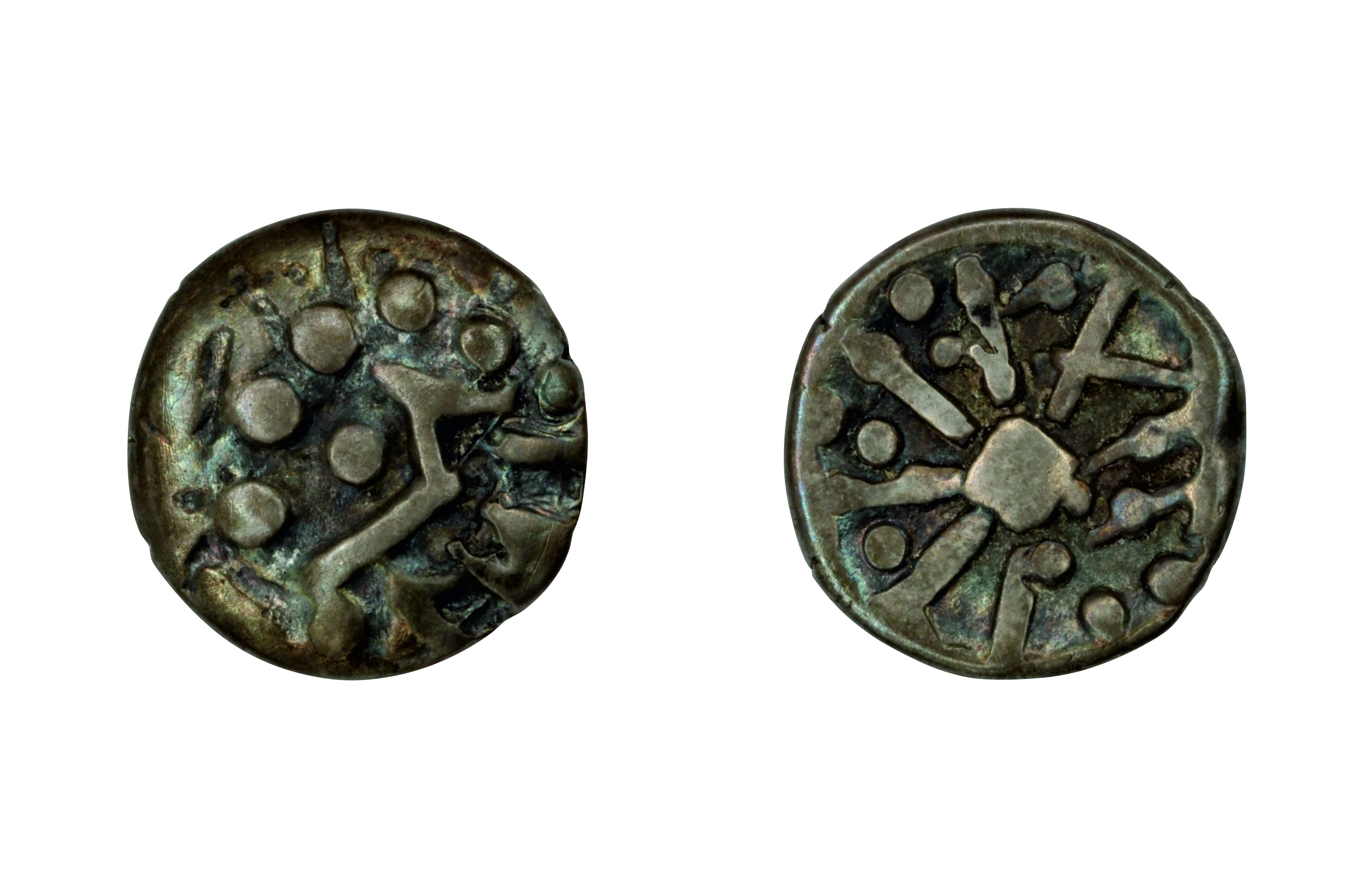
Celtic coin type "Divinka" from Divinka in Slovakia.

The Boii gave their name to Bohemia and Bologna; a Celtic coin (Biatec) from Bratislava's mint is displayed on a Slovak 5 koruna coin, which was in use until Slovakia joined the euro zone on January 1, 2009.

A tribe of Celts called Eburones minted gold coins with triple spirals (a Celtic good luck symbol) on the front, and horses on the back.

The coins were either struck or cast. Both methods required a substantial degree of knowledge. Striking a blank coin formed in a clay mould was one way. After forming the blank, it would have been flattened out before striking with a die made from iron or bronze. The tiny details engraved on dies were just a few millimeters in diameter. Casting a coin required a different technique. They were produced by pouring molten alloy into a set of molds which were broken apart when the metal had cooled.

With the Roman invasion of Gaul, Greek-inspired Celtic coinage started to incorporate Roman influence instead, until it disappeared to be completely replaced by Roman coinage.

== British Celtic coinage ==
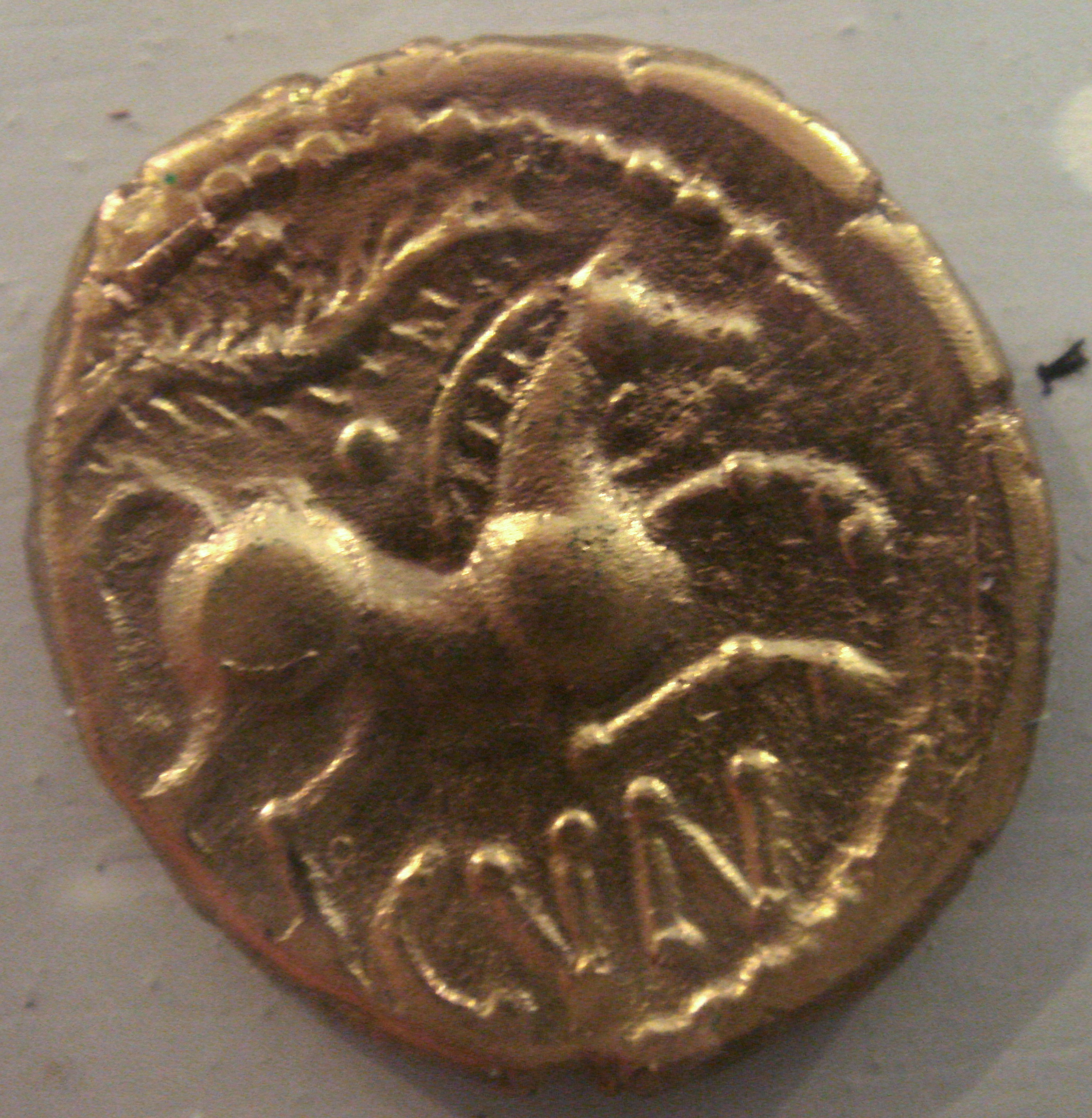
Coin of the Catuvellauni minted at Camulodunum.

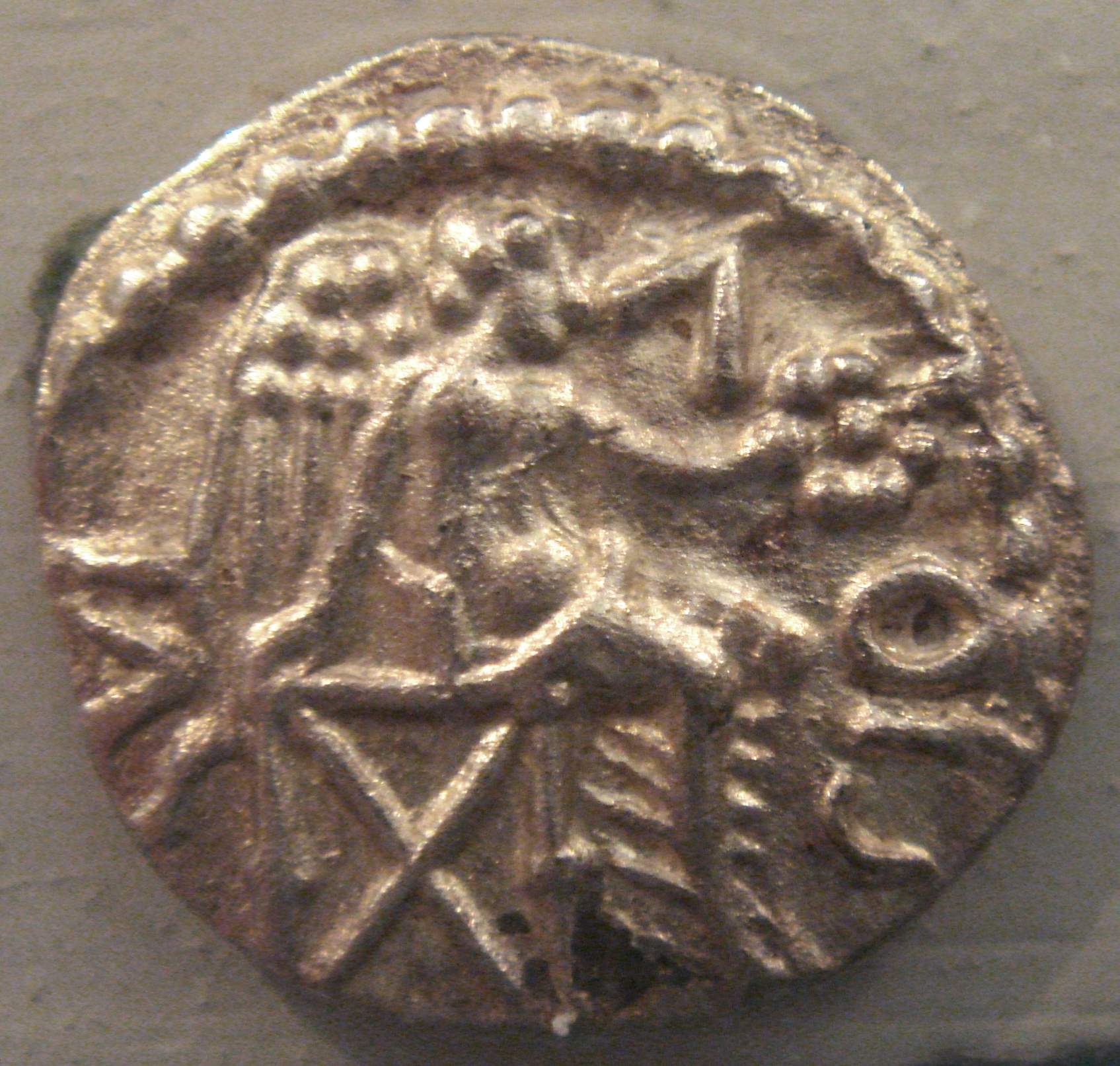
Coin of the Regni.

Traditional historians have tended to overlook the role played by Celtic coinage in the early history of British money.

Over 45,000 of the ancient British and Gaulish coins discovered in Britain have been recorded at the Oxford Celtic Coin Index. The Trinovantian tribal oppidum of Camulodunum (modern Colchester) was minting large numbers of coins in the first centuries BC and AD, which have been found across Southern Britain. Common motifs on the Camulodunon coins included horses and wheat/barley sheafs, with the names of the rulers usually in Latin script, or more rarely in Greek.
