= Lietava (disambiguation) =

Lietava may refer to:

== Slovakia ==
- Lietava
- Lietava Castle

== Lithuania ==
- Lietava (Neris)
- FK Jonava
