= Žilina Airport =

Žilina Airport Letisko Žilina
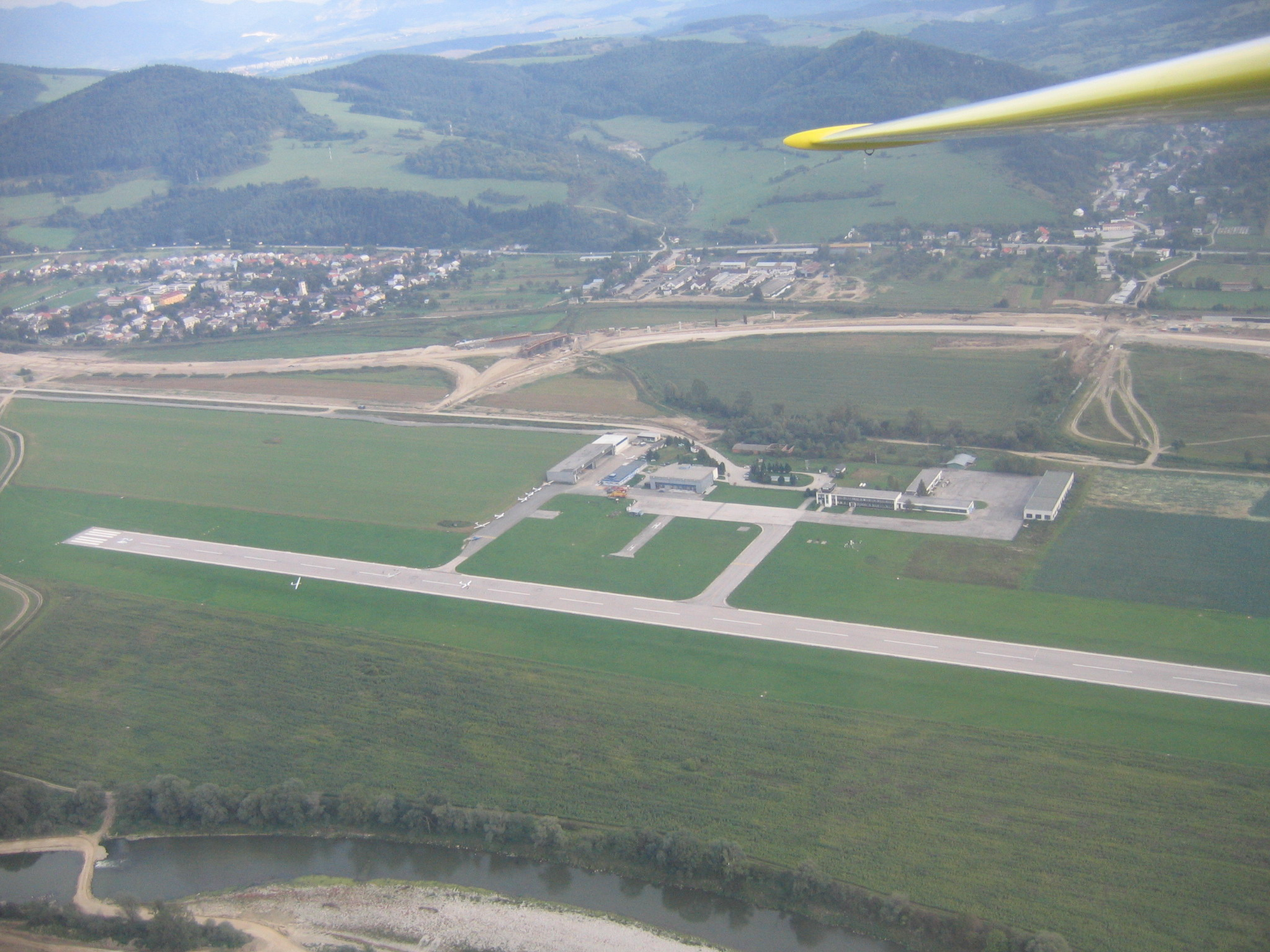
- IATA: ILZ; ICAO: LZZI

Summary
- Airport type: Public
- Operator: Letisko Žilina a.s.
- Serves: Žilina
- Location: Dolný Hričov, Slovakia
- Elevation AMSL: 1,020 ft / 311 m
- Coordinates: 49°13′53″N 18°36′48″E
- Website: www.letisko.sk

Map
- Location of airport in Slovakia

Runways
Direction	Length		Surface
Direction	m	ft	Surface
06/24	1,150	3,773	Concrete

Žilina Airport (IATA: ILZ, ICAO: LZZI) is an international public airport located in Žilina, Slovakia. Located near the village of Dolný Hričov, the airport is situated approximately 15 km from the city centre of Žilina and 12 km from the city's railway station. The airport is largely used for international and domestic flights, but caters to private, amateur sport and air ambulance flights. Žilina airport often serves as a primary training airport for students at the University of Žilina majoring in air transport-related studies.

== History ==
The airport was built in the 1970s to replace the old Brezovský Majer airport, to give way to the growing city of Žilina. The first flight to Prague was done on 4 May 1972, and the airport was officially opened on 2 August 1974.

== Airlines and destinations ==
As of 20 June 2024, there are no scheduled passenger services to/from Žilina Airport.
