= City Tower =

City Tower may refer to:

- City Tower, Manchester
- City Tower, Liverpool
- City Tower (Prague)
- City Tower, Seberang Perai
- City Tower (Trnava)
- Sheraton City Tower
- City Point (Brooklyn)
- City Tower (San Antonio)
