= Biatec =

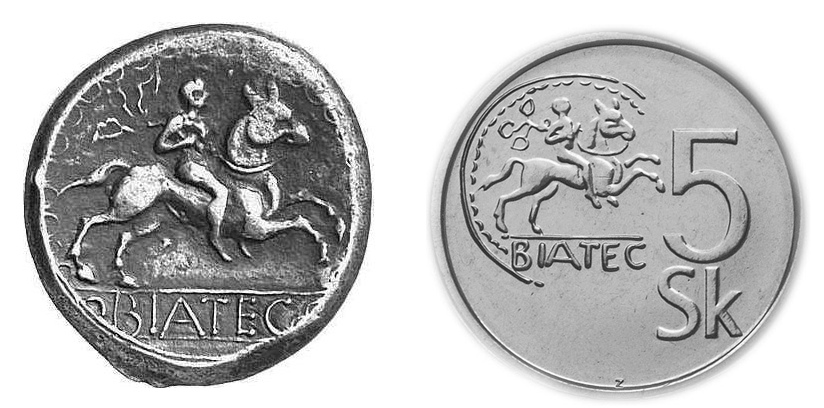
An original Biatec and its replica on a modern 5-koruna coin, which was in use until Slovakia joined the euro zone on January 1, 2009

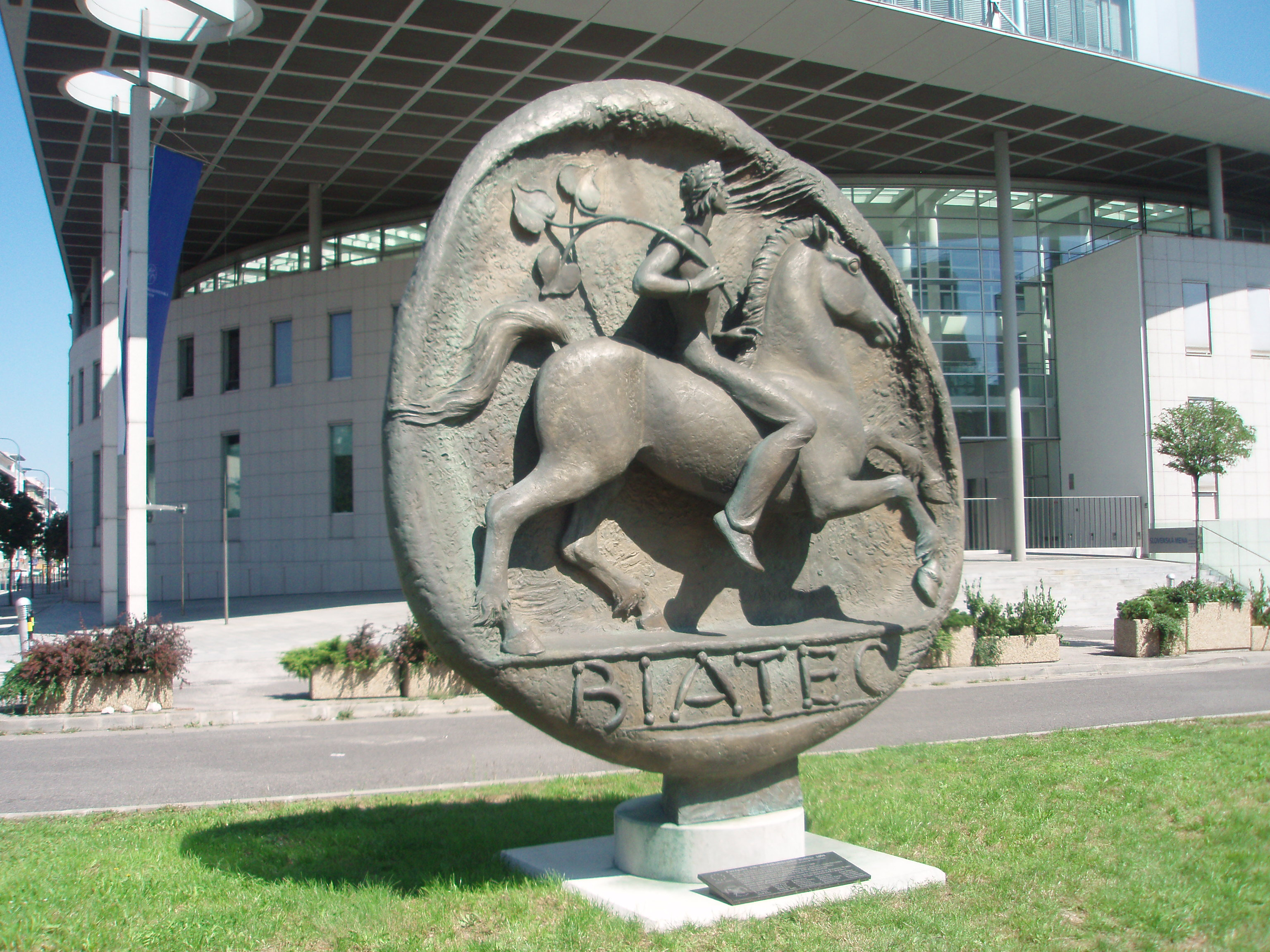
Biatec sculpture in Bratislava at National Bank of Slovakia

Biatec was the name of a person, presumably a king, who appeared on the Celtic coins minted by the Boii in Bratislava (the capital of Slovakia) in the 1st century BC. The word Biatec (or Biatex) is also used as the name of those coins. In the literature, they are also sometimes referred to as "hexadrachms of the Bratislava type". Biatecs, in fact tetradrachms made of high-quality silver and staters made of gold as well as smaller denominations in silver and bronze, bear inscriptions in capital Latin letters. Among 14 different inscriptions (for example NONNOS, DEVIL, BUSU, BUSSUMARUS, TITTO), BIATEC appears most frequently. The inscriptions represent the oldest-known use of writing in Slovakia and the neighboring territories. The coins have a diameter of 25 millimeters and a weight of 16.5–17 grams. The obverse usually shows various depictions of a head or a pair of heads. The reverse usually shows a horseman, but various mythological and real animals also feature.
