= Slovak koruna =

Currency of Slovakia from 1993 to 2008

slovenská koruna (Slovak)
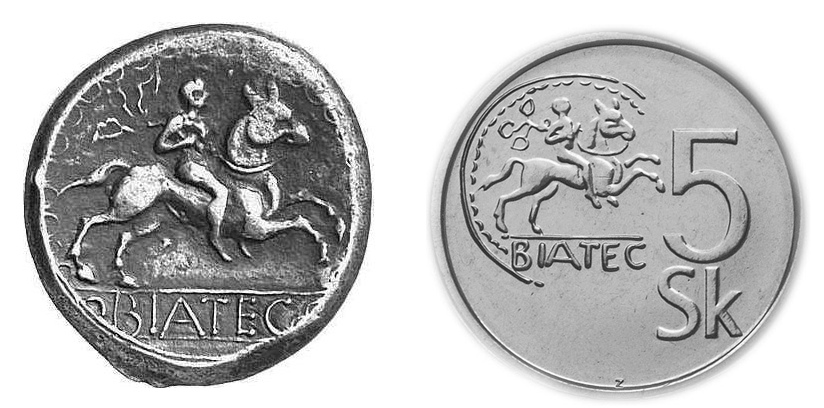
- The 5 korún coin (right) was based on a Celtic coin of Biatec (left).

ISO 4217
- Code: SKK

Units of account
- Plural: koruny (nominative)
- Symbol: Sk
- Subunit
- 1/100: halierov
- Symbol
- halierov: h

Denominations
- Banknotes: 20 Sk, 50 Sk, 100 Sk, 200 Sk, 500 Sk, 1000 Sk, 5000 Sk
- Coins: 10 h, 20 h, 50 h, 1 Sk, 2 Sk, 5 Sk, 10 Sk

Demographics
- Date of introduction: 8 February 1993
- Replaced: Czechoslovak koruna
- Date of withdrawal: 31 December 2008
- User(s): None, previously: Slovakia

Issuance
- Central bank: National Bank of Slovakia
- Website: www.nbs.sk

Valuation
- Inflation: 3.5% (December 2008)

EU Exchange Rate Mechanism (ERM)
- Since: 28 November 2005
- Replaced by euro, non cash: 1 January 2009
- Replaced by euro, cash: 16 January 2009
- 1 € =: 30.1260 Sk^{1}
- Band: 15%
- This infobox shows the latest status before this currency was rendered obsolete.^{1} The rate has changed twice. See article for details.

The Slovak koruna or Slovak crown (Slovak: slovenská koruna, literally meaning Slovak crown) was the currency of Slovakia between 8 February 1993 and 31 December 2008, and could be used for cash payment until 16 January 2009. The ISO 4217 code was SKK and the local abbreviation was Sk. The koruna was subdivided into 100 halierov (abbreviated as "hal." or simply "h", singular: halier). The abbreviation is placed after the numeric value.

Slovakia switched its currency from the koruna to the euro on 1 January 2009, at a rate of 30.1260 korunas per euro. Both currencies could still be used for a two-week transitional period until 16 January 2009.

In Slovak, the nouns koruna and halier both have two plural forms, following standard declension in Slovak. "Koruny" and haliere appear after the numbers 2, 3 and 4 and in generic (uncountable) context, with korún and halierov being used after other numbers. The latter forms are genitive.

== Modern koruna ==
In 1993, the newly independent Slovakia introduced its own koruna, replacing the Czechoslovak koruna at par.

=== Coins ===
In 1993, coins were introduced in denominations of 10, 20 and 50 halierov, 1, 2, 5 and 10 korunas. The 10 and 20 halier coins were taken out of circulation on 31 December 2003. In 1996 the 50 halier coin was made smaller and instead of aluminium it was made with copper plated steel.

The obverse of the coins feature the coat of arms of Slovakia, with motifs from Slovak history on the reverses.

- 10 halierov (silver-coloured) – Octagonal wooden belfry from Zemplín (early 19th century) = € 0.0033
- 20 halierov (silver-coloured) – the Kriváň peak in the High Tatras = €0.0066
- 50 halierov (copper-coloured) – Renaissance polygonal tower of Devín Castle = € 0.0166
- 1 koruna (copper-coloured) – Gothic wooden sculpture of the Madonna with child (c. 1500) = € 0.0332
- 2 koruny (silver-coloured) – Earthen sculpture of the sitting Venus of Hradok (4th millennium BC) = € 0.0664
- 5 korún (silver-coloured) – Reverse of a Celtic coin of Biatec (1st century BC) = € 0.166
- 10 korún (copper-coloured) – Bronze cross (11th century A.D.) = € 0.332

Coins were exchangeable for euros at the National Bank of Slovakia until January 2, 2014.

Coins of the Slovak koruna (1993) Designer: Drahomír Zobek
Image	Value	Technical parameters			Description			Issued from
Image	Value	Diameter (mm)	Mass (g)	Composition	Edge	Obverse	Reverse	Issued from
	10 h	17.00	0.72	Aluminium: 98% Magnesium: 2%	Smooth	Kožuchovce church; value	Coat of arms; year of issue; lettering: SLOVENSKÁ; REPUBLIKA	1993–2003
	20 h	19.50	0.95	Aluminium: 96% Magnesium: 4%	Reeded	Kriváň; value	Coat of arms; year of issue; lettering: SLOVENSKÁ; REPUBLIKA	1993–2003
	50 h	22.00	1.20	Aluminium: 98% Magnesium: 2%	Smooth	Devín Castle; value	Coat of arms; year of issue; lettering: SLOVENSKÁ; REPUBLIKA	1993–1995
	50 h	18.75	2.80	Copper-plated iron	Interrupted reeding	Devín Castle; value	Coat of arms; year of issue; lettering: SLOVENSKÁ; REPUBLIKA	1996–2008
	1 Sk	21.00	3.85	Copper-tin-plated iron	Reeded	Madonna and child; value	Coat of arms; year of issue; lettering: SLOVENSKÁ; REPUBLIKA	1993–2008
	2 Sk	22.50	4.40	Nickel-plated iron	Ornamental	Venus (Nitriansky Hrádok); value	Coat of arms; year of issue; lettering: SLOVENSKÁ; REPUBLIKA	1993–2008
	5 Sk	24.75	5.40	Nickel-plated iron	Reeded	Biatec; value	Coat of arms; year of issue; lettering: SLOVENSKÁ; REPUBLIKA	1993–2008
	10 Sk	26.50	6.60	Copper: 92% Aluminium: 6% Nickel: 2%	Ornamental	Encolpion cross; value	Coat of arms; year of issue; lettering: SLOVENSKÁ; REPUBLIKA	1993–2008

=== Banknotes ===
At midnight on 31 December 1992, the Czech and Slovak Federative Republic bifurcated into the Czech Republic and the Slovak Republic. In 1993, the newly independent Slovakia introduced its own koruna, replacing the Czechoslovak koruna at par. Provisional banknotes were issued in denominations of 20, 50, 100, 500, and 1,000 korún by affixing stamps bearing the coat of arms of Slovakia and the denomination to Czechoslovak banknotes. Later that year Slovakia issued its own set of banknotes. The main motifs on the obverses of the banknotes represent important people living in the territory of the present Slovakia in various historical eras. On the reverses, these motifs are completed by depicting places where these people lived and were active.

Banknotes of the Slovak koruna (1993–1995) Designer: Jozef Bubák
Image	Value	Euro equivalent	Dimensions (mm)	Main colour	Description		Issued from	Withdrawn
Image	Value	Euro equivalent	Dimensions (mm)	Main colour	Obverse	Reverse	Issued from	Withdrawn
	20 Sk	€0.66	128 x 65	Green	Prince Pribina	Nitra Castle	1993–2006	2009
	50 Sk	€1.66	134 x 68	Blue	Saints Cyril and Methodius	Dražovce church; Glagolitic alphabet	1993–2005	2009
	100 Sk	€3.32	140 x 71	Red	Madonna (Basilica of St. James)	Basilica of St. James and Old Townhall, Levoča	1993–2004	2009
	200 Sk	€6.64	146 x 74	Turquoise	Anton Bernolák	City Tower; Trnava in 18th century	1995; 1999–2006	2009
	500 Sk	€16.60	152 x 77	Brown	Ľudovít Štúr	Bratislava Castle; Michael's Gate	1993–1996; 2003–2006	2009
	1000 Sk	€33.19	158 x 80	Purple	Andrej Hlinka	Madonna (Church of St. Šimon and Judah), Liptovské Sliače; St. Andrew's Church, Ružomberok	1993–1996; 1999–2007	2009
	5000 Sk	€165.97	164 x 82	Orange	Milan Rastislav Štefánik	Stefanik's grave, Bradlo Hill; Ursa Major	1995; 1999–2003	2009

Slovak banknotes denominated in koruny can be exchanged for euros indefinitely.

=== Historical exchange rates ===
Historical exchange rates from 1999

The graph shows the value of the euro in korunas from 1999 to December 2008. As may be seen, the currency strengthened as Slovakia's economy did. The koruna joined the ERM II on 28 November 2005 at the rate of € = 38.4550 Sk with a 15% band. On 17 March 2007, this rate was readjusted to 35.4424 Sk with the same band, an 8.5% increase in the value of the koruna. On the same day, 1 euro traded at 33.959 Sk. The central rate of koruna was then adjusted once more on 28 May 2008 to 33.8545 with no change in the band.

== See also ==
- Slovak koruna (1939–1945)
- Czechoslovak koruna
- Economy of Slovakia
- Slovak euro coins
- Dissolution of Czechoslovakia

== Notes ==
Preceded by: Czechoslovak koruna Reason: independence Ratio: at par	Currency of Slovakia; 1939 – 1945	Succeeded by: Czechoslovak koruna Reason: restoration of Czechoslovakia; Ratio: ?
Preceded by: Czechoslovak koruna Reason: independence Ratio: at par	Currency of Slovakia; 1993 – 2009	Succeeded by: Euro; Reason: entry into Eurozone; Ratio: 1 EUR = 30.1260 SKK
