= City Tower (Trnava) =

Coordinates: 48.3778°N 17.5853°E

- Mestská veža
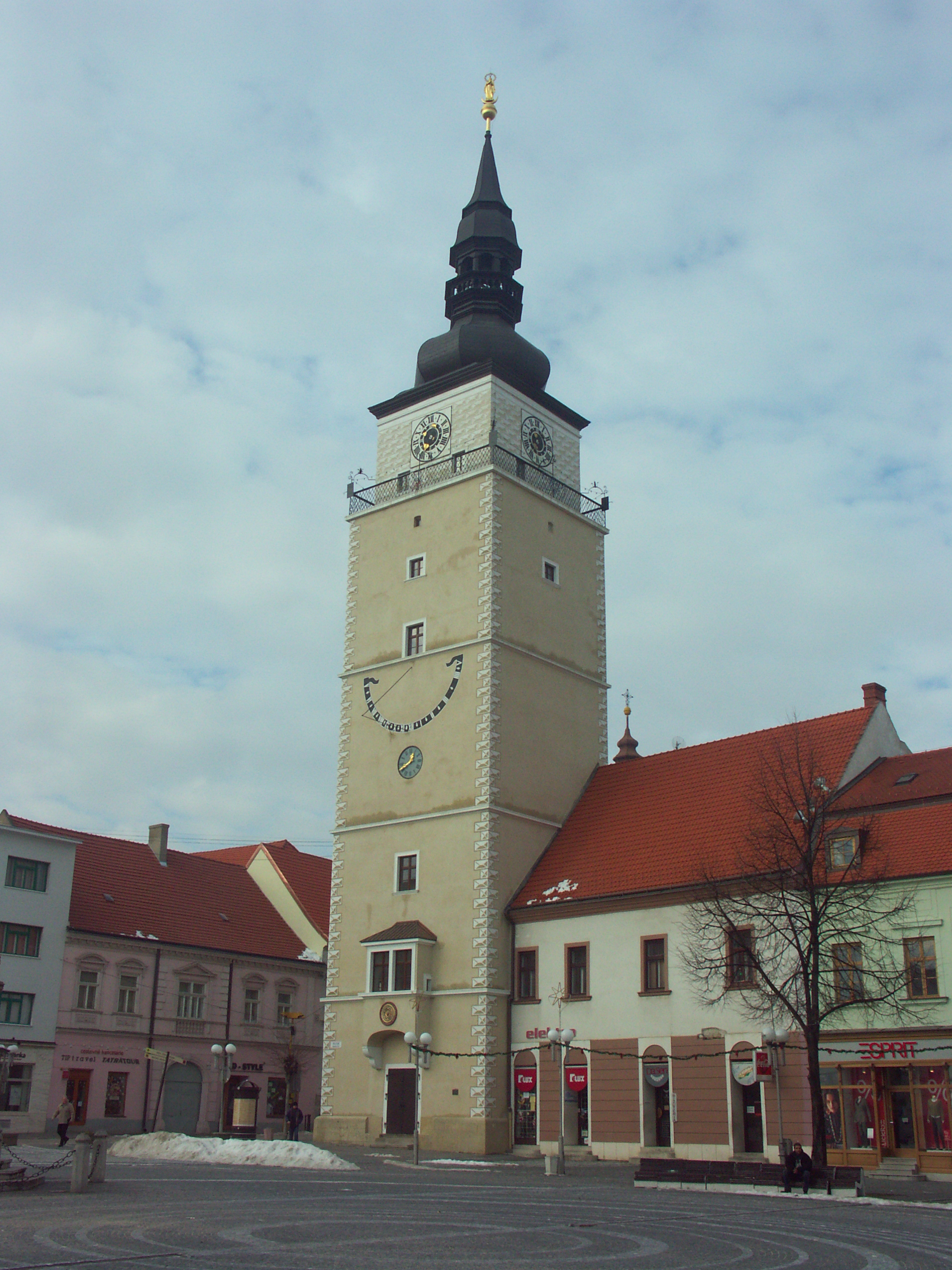
- City Tower viewed from the Saint Trinity Square
- City Tower
- Location: Trnava, Slovakia

Specifications
- Height: 57 meters

The City Tower (in Slovak Mestská veža) is one of the most important historic monuments of Trnava, Slovakia.

The tower was constructed in 1574. In 1666 and 1683 the tower was affected by fire and since then it has remained without a roof.

== History ==
The history of the Town Tower dates back to 1574. The builder of this 60-meter-high beauty was the local master mason Jakub. In its heyday, the Town Tower represented a symbol of the prestige and prosperity of the city. The monumental Renaissance building was designed so that it could serve multiple purposes. In times of Turkish danger, it was used to improve the defense system, as a guard lookout tower. However, the tower also had an alarm and information function. In 1729, a mechanical clockwork from Franz Langer's workshop was installed on the fifth floor. The heart of the Town Tower has been looked after by the male branch of the Nemček family for four generations. The City Tower also houses a permanent exhibition dedicated to the older and younger history of Trnava, the history of the City Tower and important Trnava figures. In 2018, when local football club Spartak Trnava won the Slovak First Football League, their fan base, Ultras Spartak, lit fireworks from the top of the City Tower to celebrate. In 2023, banner were put up on the tower to celebrate the clubs 100th year as a club.

== Architecture ==
The tower has a square ground plan in the shape of a solid prism with eight floors and is 57 metres high. The tower has a scenic gallery 29 metres above ground level. The corners and the highest floor are decorated with diamond sgraffito. On the south-west side is a sundial. In the alcove above the entrance is circular relief a symbol of Christ.
