= Dolný Hričov =

Village and municipality in Žilina District in northern Slovakia

- Municipality
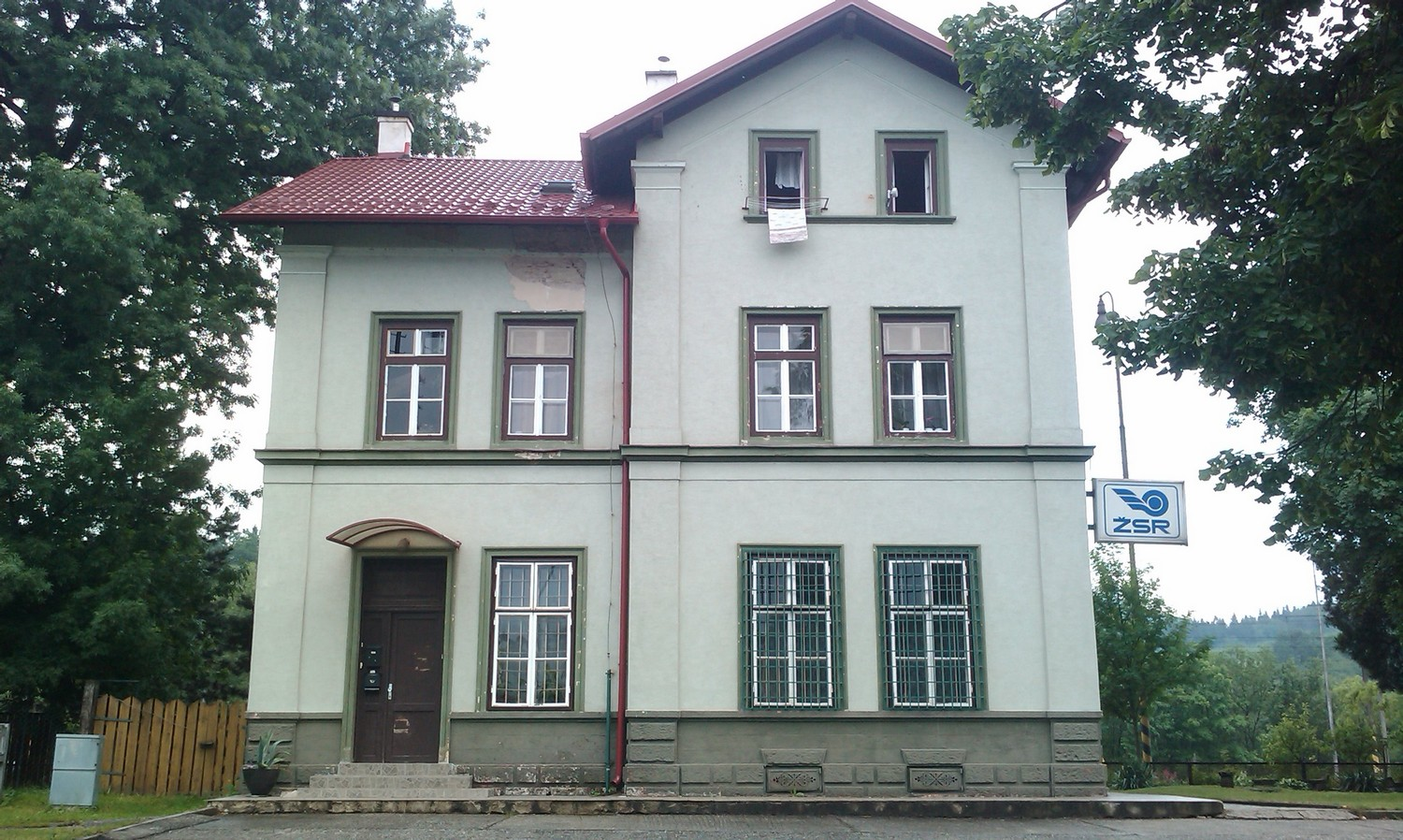
- Train station

- Flag

- Location of Dolný Hričov in the Žilina Region Location of Dolný Hričov in Slovakia
- Coordinates: 49.23°N 18.63°E
- Country: Slovakia
- Region: Žilina Region
- District: Žilina District
- First mentioned: 1208

Area
  - Total: 12.45 km^{2} (4.81 sq mi)
- Elevation: 356 m (1,168 ft)

Population (2025)
  - Total: 1,704
- Time zone: UTC+1 (CET)
  - Summer (DST): UTC+2 (CEST)
- Postal code: 134 1
- Area code: +421 41
- Vehicle registration plate (until 2022): ZA
- Website: www.dolnyhricov.sk

Dolný Hričov (Hungarian: Alsóricsó) is a village and municipality in Žilina District in the Žilina Region of northern Slovakia.

== History ==
In historical records the village was first mentioned in 1208.

== Geography ==
The municipality lies at an altitude of 356 metres (1,168 ft) and covers an area of 12.45 km^{2} (4.81 sq mi) (2025).

=== Climate ===
Climate data for Dolný Hričov (1991−2020)
Month	Jan	Feb	Mar	Apr	May	Jun	Jul	Aug	Sep	Oct	Nov	Dec	Year
Record high °C (°F)	14.7 (58.5)	16.2 (61.2)	22.7 (72.9)	29.0 (84.2)	31.0 (87.8)	34.0 (93.2)	36.3 (97.3)	37.4 (99.3)	33.2 (91.8)	27.5 (81.5)	22.4 (72.3)	14.9 (58.8)	37.4 (99.3)
Mean daily maximum °C (°F)	1.4 (34.5)	4.2 (39.6)	9.1 (48.4)	15.9 (60.6)	20.4 (68.7)	23.9 (75.0)	25.8 (78.4)	25.9 (78.6)	20.2 (68.4)	14.6 (58.3)	8.2 (46.8)	2.3 (36.1)	14.3 (57.7)
Daily mean °C (°F)	−2.0 (28.4)	−0.5 (31.1)	3.3 (37.9)	9.1 (48.4)	13.8 (56.8)	17.4 (63.3)	18.9 (66.0)	18.4 (65.1)	13.5 (56.3)	8.7 (47.7)	4.3 (39.7)	−0.6 (30.9)	8.7 (47.7)
Mean daily minimum °C (°F)	−5.0 (23.0)	−4.3 (24.3)	−1.3 (29.7)	3.0 (37.4)	7.7 (45.9)	11.3 (52.3)	13.0 (55.4)	12.6 (54.7)	8.7 (47.7)	4.6 (40.3)	1.0 (33.8)	−3.5 (25.7)	4.0 (39.2)
Record low °C (°F)	−24.6 (−12.3)	−22.5 (−8.5)	−19.7 (−3.5)	−8.6 (16.5)	−2.9 (26.8)	2.9 (37.2)	3.5 (38.3)	5.4 (41.7)	0.1 (32.2)	−8.4 (16.9)	−16.0 (3.2)	−22.4 (−8.3)	−24.6 (−12.3)
Average precipitation mm (inches)	46.9 (1.85)	40.1 (1.58)	45.5 (1.79)	46.5 (1.83)	74.3 (2.93)	83.9 (3.30)	93.7 (3.69)	77.9 (3.07)	68.9 (2.71)	62.8 (2.47)	51.0 (2.01)	48.3 (1.90)	739.7 (29.12)
Average precipitation days (≥ 1.0 mm)	9.9	8.0	8.4	7.5	10.3	10.4	11.0	8.8	8.6	8.8	8.5	9.7	109.6
Average snowy days	14.9	12.1	8.4	2.6	0.0	0.0	0.0	0.0	0.0	0.9	5.6	12.2	56.8
Average relative humidity (%)	84.6	79.8	74.0	66.7	69.4	71.0	71.6	73.4	78.4	81.4	83.8	85.5	76.6
Mean monthly sunshine hours	48.8	72.6	125.5	179.0	212.1	228.5	243.8	235.7	154.1	106.7	52.9	40.5	1,700.2
Source: NOAA

== Population ==
Population statistic (10 years)
Year	1995	2005	2015	2025
Count	1404	1514	1570	1704
Difference		+7.83%	+3.69%	+8.53%

Population statistic
Year	2024	2025
Count	1692	1704
Difference		+0.70%

It has a population of 1704 people (31 December 2025).

=== Ethnicity ===
Census 2021 (1+ %)
Ethnicity	Number	Fraction
Slovak	1593	96.48%
Not found out	56	3.39%
Total	1651	

In year 2021 was 1651 people by ethnicity 1593 as Slovak, 56 as Not found out, 10 as Other, 8 as Czech, 6 as Russian, 2 as Rusyn, 2 as German, 1 as Romani and 1 as English.

Note on population: The difference values of population numbers in the table "Population statistic" and in the sections "Ethnicity" & "Religion" is caused by the use of various statistical methods.

=== Religion ===
Census 2021 (1+ %)
Religion	Number	Fraction
Roman Catholic Church	1336	80.92%
None	215	13.02%
Not found out	54	3.27%
Total	1651	

In year 2021 was 1651 people by religion 1336 from Roman Catholic Church, 215 from None, 54 from Not found out, 16 from Evangelical Church, 6 from Other and not ascertained christian church, 6 from Greek Catholic Church, 5 from Christian Congregations in Slovakia, 5 from Ad hoc movements, 3 from Buddhism, 2 from Eastern Orthodox Church, 1 from Jewish community, 1 from Jehovah's Witnesses and 1 from Other.

== Genealogical resources ==
The records for genealogical research are available at the state archive "Statny Archiv in Bytca, Slovakia"

- Roman Catholic church records (births/marriages/deaths): 1690-1952 (parish A)

== See also ==
- List of municipalities and towns in Slovakia
