= Lietava, Slovakia =

Lietava
- Municipality
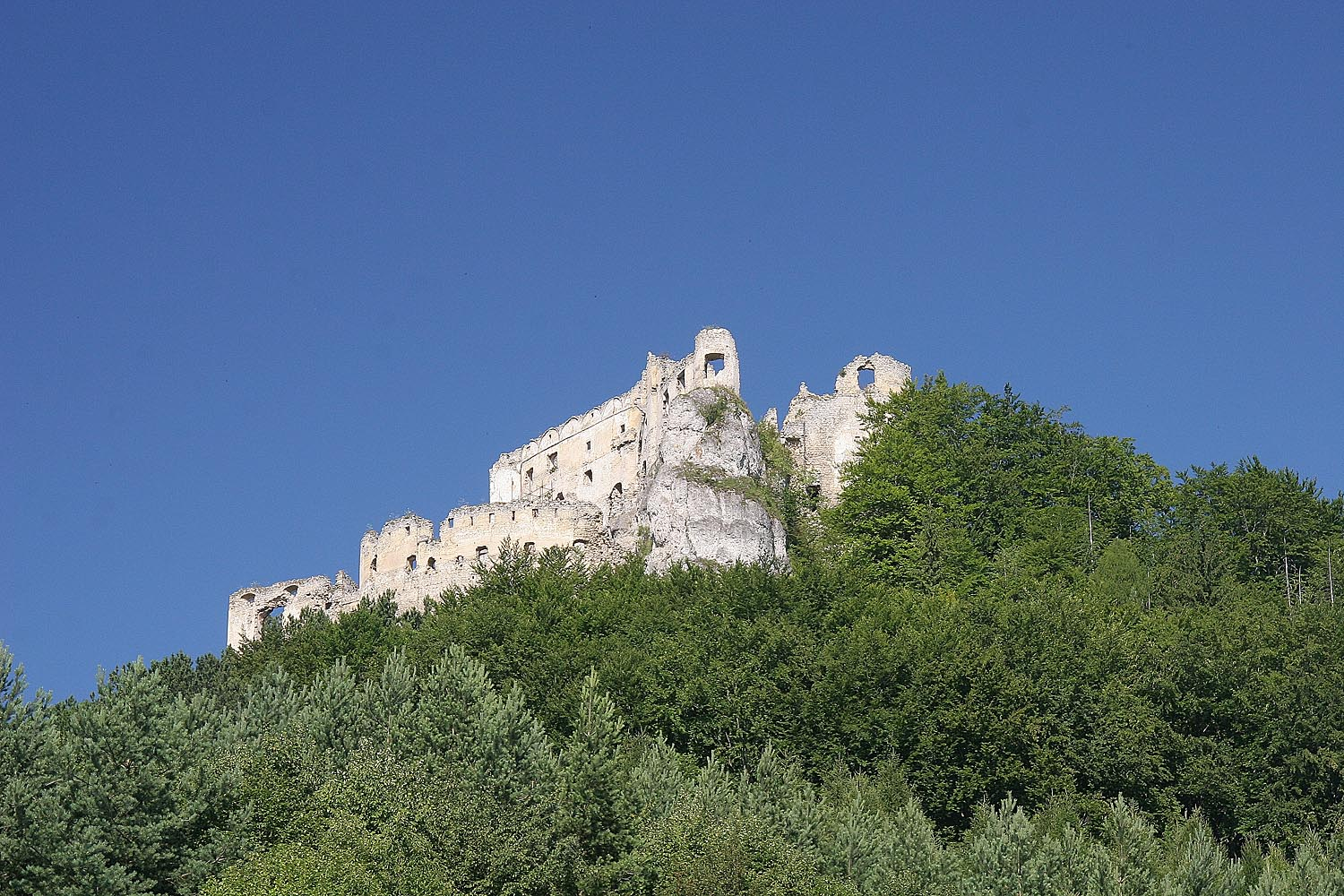
- Lietava Castle above the village

- Flag

- Location of Lietava in the Žilina Region Location of Lietava in Slovakia
- Coordinates: 49°10′N 18°41′E
- Country: Slovakia
- Region: Žilina Region
- District: Žilina District
- First mentioned: 1300

Area
  - Total: 10.00 km^{2} (3.86 sq mi)
- Elevation: 445 m (1,460 ft)

Population (2025)
  - Total: 1,765
- Time zone: UTC+1 (CET)
  - Summer (DST): UTC+2 (CEST)
- Postal code: 131 8
- Area code: +421 41
- Vehicle registration plate (until 2022): ZA
- Website: www.lietava.info

Lietava (Hungarian: Zsolnalitva) is a village and municipality in Žilina District in the Žilina Region of northern Slovakia. Lietava Castle, the third largest castle in Slovakia, is in the village.

== History ==
In historical records the village was first mentioned in the year 1300 AD.

== Geography ==
The municipality lies at an altitude of 445 metres (1,460 ft) and covers an area of 10.00 km^{2} (3.86 sq mi) (2025).

== Population ==
Population statistic (10 years)
Year	1995	2005	2015	2025
Count	1289	1443	1443	1765
Difference		+11.94%	+0%	+22.31%

Population statistic
Year	2024	2025
Count	1728	1765
Difference		+2.14%

It has a population of 1765 people (31 December 2025).

=== Ethnicity ===
Census 2021 (1+ %)
Ethnicity	Number	Fraction
Slovak	1578	98.56%
Total	1601	

In year 2021 was 1601 people by ethnicity 1578 as Slovak, 16 as Not found out, 13 as Other, 10 as Czech, 4 as Italian, 3 as Moravian, 2 as Russian, 2 as Polish, 2 as German, 2 as Hungarian, 1 as Jewish and 1 as Romani.

Note on population: The difference values of population numbers in the table "Population statistic" and in the sections "Ethnicity" & "Religion" is caused by the use of various statistical methods.

=== Religion ===
Census 2021 (1+ %)
Religion	Number	Fraction
Roman Catholic Church	1264	78.95%
None	264	16.49%
Total	1601	

In year 2021 was 1601 people by religion 1264 from Roman Catholic Church, 264 from None, 15 from Not found out, 15 from Evangelical Church, 7 from Calvinist Church, 7 from Other, 5 from Greek Catholic Church, 5 from Buddhism, 5 from Ad hoc movements, 4 from Jehovah's Witnesses, 3 from Christian Congregations in Slovakia, 3 from Church of the Brethren, 2 from Eastern Orthodox Church, 1 from Old Catholic Church and 1 from Hinduism.
