= Lietava Castle =

Castle in Slovakia

Coordinates: 49°09′39″N 18°41′05″E

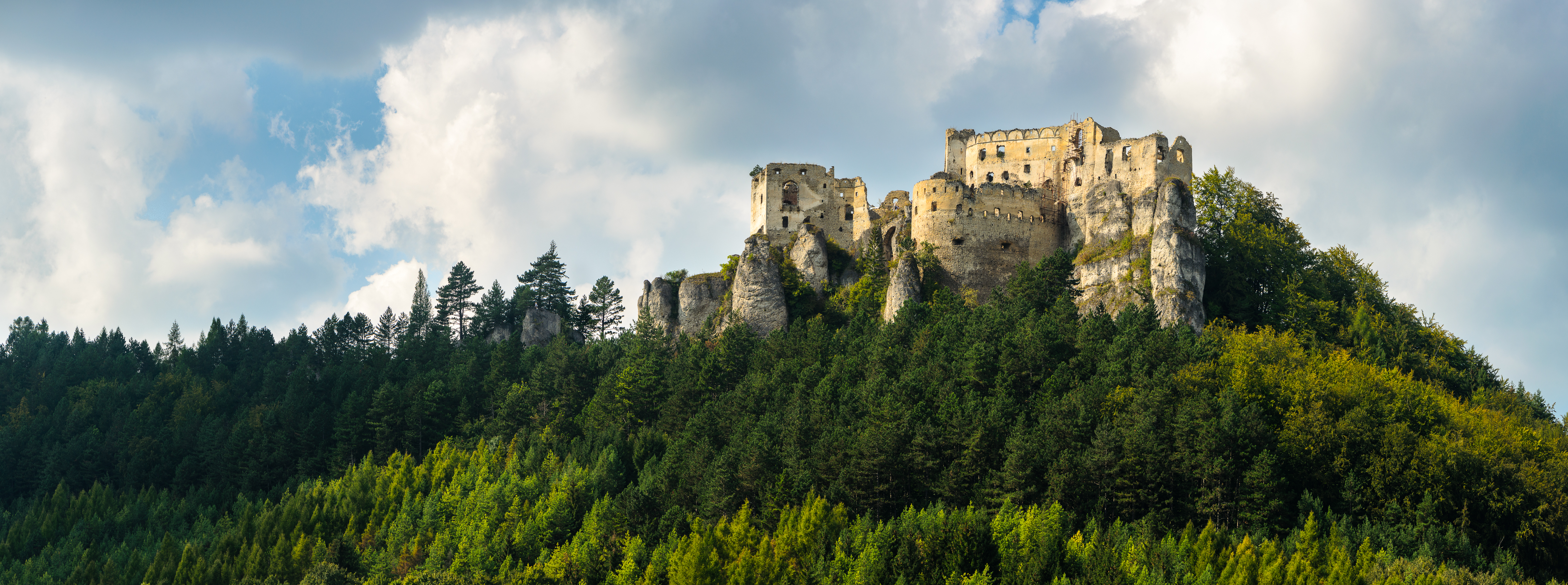
Lietava Castle from Lietavská Svinná

Lietava Castle (Slovak: Lietavský hrad, older names Litova, Letava, Lethowa, Zsolnalitva) is an extensive castle ruin in the Súľov Mountains of northern Slovakia, between the villages of Lietava and Lietavská Svinná-Babkov in the Žilina District.

== History ==
The castle was built after 1241, most likely as an administrative and military centre. It occupies a strategic position alongside the Amber Road, a trade route between Europe and Asia along which amber and other goods were transported. Members of the Balas family are thought to have constructed a four-storey tower, and this was expanded over the years by successive owners. In the early 14th century, it is mentioned with Máté Csák III, one of the powerful magnates in the Kingdom of Hungary. The castle changed hands several times until the 16th century when the Thurzó family gained it. It was reconstructed in the Gothic-Renaissance style and fortified, and given its own military garrison. The weathered remains of this reconstruction are what remains; its past grandeur can be seen in the coats of arms, the renaissance portals, the inscriptions and grand fireplaces. After the death of Imre Thurzó in 1621, it was divided between his heirs. After the ownership disputes in 1641, they lost interest in it. The castle report in 1698 said that the castle was uninhabited and there was only an archive, which was moved to the Orava Castle (Hungarian: Árva) in the 1760s. After that, the castle was abandoned and not used any more.

== Today ==
Today the castle is in the hands of the non-profit organisation Združenie na záchranu Lietavského hradu, which takes care of the castle and oversees its conservation. It can be accessed along a blue waymarked trail from the village of Lietava, a walk that takes about thirty minutes. It is one of the most-visited castles in the country.
