= Rajecká dolina valley =

Coordinates: 49°06′00″N 18°38′00″E

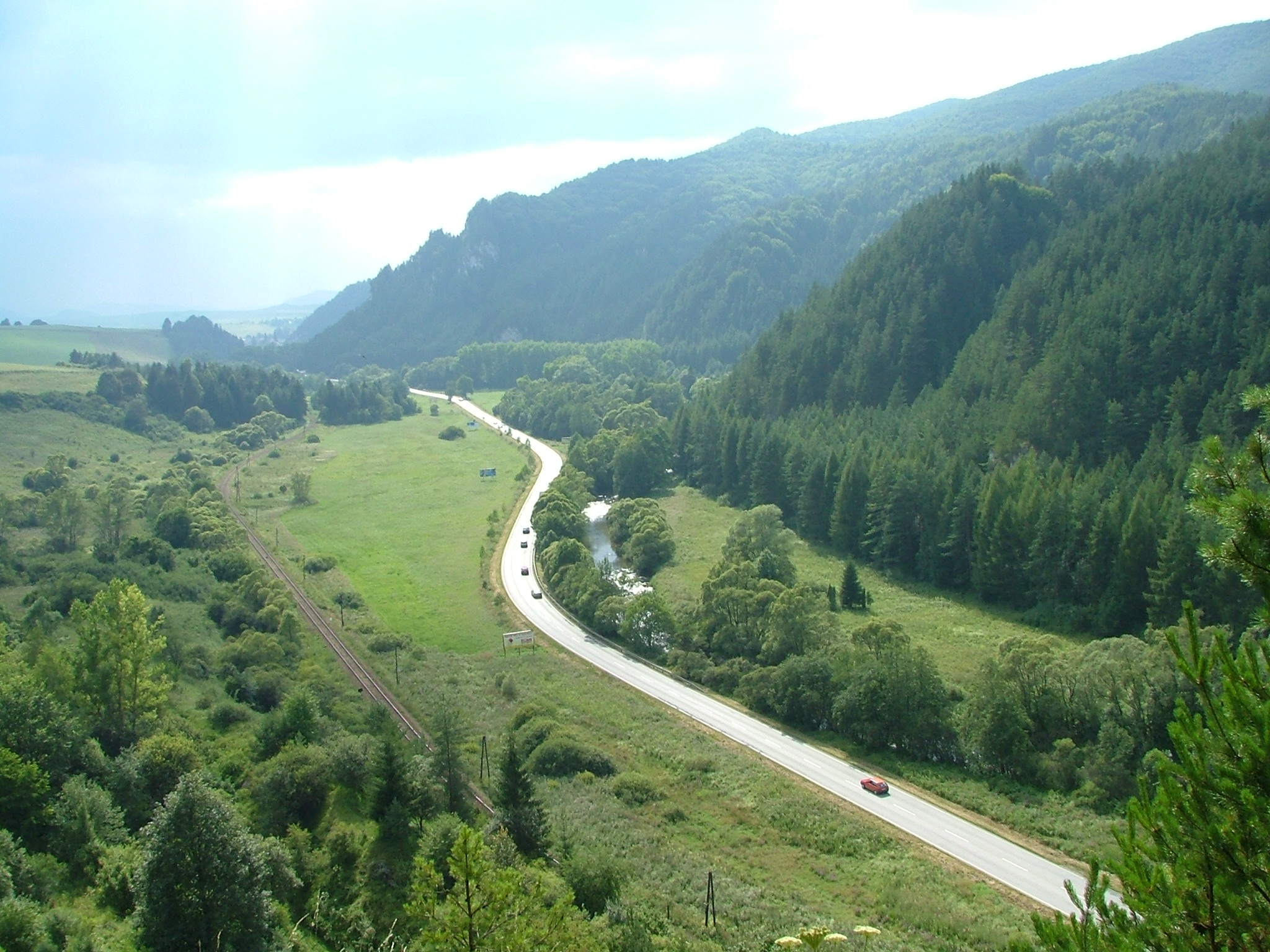
Stredná časť doliny pri Turskej skale

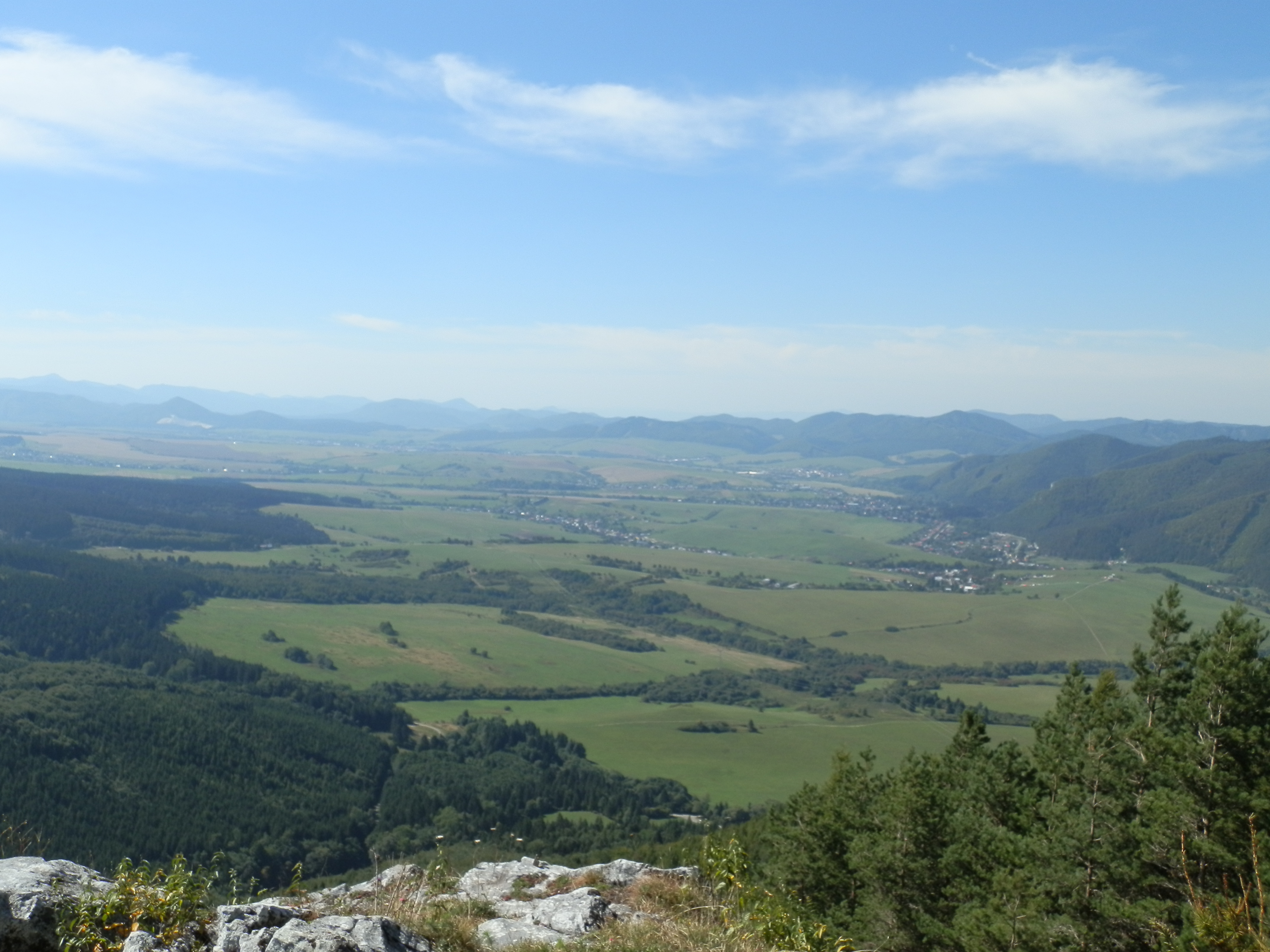
Pohľad na dolinu z Čipčia

Rajecká dolina valley is a part of southern part of Žilina county in Slovakia. It is usually confused with Rajecká kotlina, which is only a part of the whole valley located between Rajecká Lesná and Turie. Axis of the land is river Rajčanka.

== Definition ==
The valley covers whole watershed of the river Rajčanka, starting at the source located south-west of town of Čičmany, ending by the estuary of the river of Váh. Unlike the Rajecká kotlina it cover both villages of Čičmany and Fačkov, south part of village of Porúbka, village of Lietavská Lúčka a city of Žilina.

== History ==
The valley faced heavy fighting during the Slovak National Uprising.

== Transport ==
Through the valley passes the main road connecting city of Žilina and region of Horná Nitra, national road I/64, to which are connected all other villages of the region. From the city of Považská Bystrica up to the city of Rajec a national road national road II/517is leading. Main role covers rail roads between Žilina and Rajec rail road, which covers both passenger and goods transport.
