= Names of European cities in different languages (Q–T) =

Different names for European cities in neighbouring languages

The names used for some major European cities differ in different European and sometimes non-European languages. In some countries where there are two or more languages spoken, such as Belgium or Switzerland, dual forms may be used within the city itself, for example on signage. This is also the case in Ireland, despite a low level of actual usage of the Irish language. In other cases where a regional language is officially recognised, that form of the name may be used in the region, but not nationally. Examples include the Welsh language in Wales in the United Kingdom, and parts of Italy and Spain.

There is a slow trend to return to the local name, which has been going on for a long time. In English Livorno is now used, the old English form of Leghorn having become antiquated at least a century ago. In some cases, such as the replacement of Danzig with Gdańsk, the official name has been changed more recently. Since 1995, the government of Ukraine has encouraged the use of Kyiv rather than Kiev.

== Q ==
English name	Other names or former names
(France) Quimper	Civitas Aquilonia or Corisopitum (Latin), Kemper (Breton), Quimper (French), Кемпер (Macedonian)

== R ==
English name	Other names or former names
(Finland) Raahe	Brahestad (Swedish), Raahe (Finnish), Рахе (Macedonian), 拉赫/Lāhè (Mandarin)
(Poland) Racibórz	Ratibor (German), Ratiboř (Czech), 拉提波/Lātíbō (Mandarin)
(Poland) Radzionków	Radzionków (Polish), Radzionkau (German)
(Romania) Rădăuți	Rădăuți (Romanian), Radautz (German), Radevits - ראַדעװיץ (Yiddish), Rádóc (Hungarian), Radowce (Polish), Rothacenum (Latin), Радауци (Macedonian)
(North Macedonia) Radoviš	Radoviš (Serbian, Croatian, Slovene, Bosnian), Радовиш (Macedonian)
(Poland) Radymno	Radymno (Polish), Redem - רעדעם (Yiddish), Радимно (Macedonian)
(Austria) Raiding	Doborján (Hungarian), Raiding (German), Rajnof (Croatian)
(Slovakia) Rajec	Rajec (Slovak*), Rajec — Рајец (Serbian*), Rajeca (Latvian*), Rajetz (German*)
(Slovakia) Rajecké Teplice	Bad Rajetz (German*), Rajecké Teplice (Slovak*), Rajecfürdő (Hungarian*), Rajecke Tjeplice (Serbo-Croatian*), Rajecke Tjeplice — Рајецке Тјеплице (Serbian*)
(Estonia) Rakvere	Wesenberg or Wesenbergh (former Danish, German and Swedish), Rakovor - Раковор (former Russian)
(Finland) Rauma	Rauma (Estonian, Finnish), Raumo (Swedish), 劳马/勞馬/Láomǎ (Mandarin)
(Italy) Ravenna	Raben (old German), Rabenna - 라벤나 (Korean), Ravena - Равена (Bulgarian), Ravena (Portuguese*, Romanian), Rávena or Ravena (Spanish)*, Ravenna (Azeri, Finnish, Italian, Latin* Maltese), Ravenne (French*), Rabenna - Ραβέννα (Greek), Rawenna (Polish), 拉维纳/拉維納/Lāwéinà (Mandarin)
(Germany) Regensburg	Castra Regina (Latin), Radasbona (Hungarian), Ratisbon (former English), Ratisbona (Italian, Portuguese, former Romanian, Spanish, Catalan), Ratisbonne (French), Ratisvónni - Ρατισβόννη (Greek - καθαρεύουσα), Ratyzbona (Polish), Regensborg (Low Saxon), Regensburg (Dutch, German, Romanian), Regensburgi – რეგენსბურგი (Georgian*), Řezno (Czech)
(Switzerland) Reichenau	La Punt (Romansh), Reichenau (German), 莱赫瑙/萊赫瑙/Láihènǎo (Mandarin)
(France) Reims	Dourikotora - Δουρικορτόρα (Ancient Greek), Durocortorum (Latin), Reims (Finnish, French, German, Interlingua, Italian, Romanian, Spanish), Reimsa (Latvian), Reimsas (Lithuanian), Remeš (Czech, Slovak), Rēmes - Ρήμες (Greek, καθαρεύουσα), Remso (Esperanto), Rheims (English), Riemen (Dutch)
(France) Rennes	Rennes (Dutch, French, Finnish, German, Italian), Rennu - レンヌ (Japanese)*, Resnn (Gallo), Roazhon (Breton)*
(North Macedonia) Resen	Resen (English, Serbian, Croatian, Bosnian, Slovene), Ресен (Macedonian)
(Slovakia) Revúca	Groß-Rauschenbach (German*), Nagyrőce (Hungarian*), Revuca — Ревуца (Serbian*), Revúca (Slovak*), Revūca (Latvian*, Lithuanian*) Veľká Revúca (archaic Slovak)
(Iceland) Reykjavík	Réicivíc (Irish), Léikèyăwèikè - 雷克雅未克 (Chinese)*, Reikiavik (Tagalog*), Reik'iavik'i – რეიკიავიკი (Georgian*), Reikyabikeu / Reik'yabik'ŭ - 레이캬비크 (Korean), Reikyabiku - レイキャビク (Japanese)*, Reikyavik (Persian), Reikjavīka (Latvian), Reikjavikas (Lithuanian), Reikiavik (Spanish), Reiquiavique (Portuguese)*, Rejkiawik and Reykjawik (Polish alternates), Reykjarvík (Old Norse alternate), Reykjavik (Maltese), Reykjavík (Czech, Faroese, Icelandic, Norwegian, Old Norse), Rejkjaviko (Esperanto), Reykjavik (Danish, Dutch, Finnish, Italian, Norwegian, Romanian, Swedish), Reykyavik (Azeri), Reykyavik or Reykavik (Turkish)
(Latvia) Rēzekne	Rēzekne (German*), Rositten (archaic German), Rēzekne or Rēzne (Latgalian*), Rzeżyca (Polish*), Rezekne - Резекне (Russian*), Rezhitsa - Режица (archaic Russian)
(Latvia) Riga	Lĭjiā - 里加 (Chinese)*, Rīġā (Arabic), Riga (Dutch, French, German, Hungarian, Interlingua, Italian, Maltese, Portuguese, Romanian, Russian, Slovene, Spanish, Swedish, Turkish), Riga – რიგა (Georgian*), Ríga - Ρίγα (Greek), Riga - リガ (Japanese)*, Riga - 리가 (Korean), Rīga (Latvian), Ríge (Irish), Rige - ריגע (Yiddish), Rīgõ (Livonian), Riia (Estonian), Riika (Finnish), Ryga (Lithuanian, Polish), Ryha - Рыга (Belarusian), Ryha - Рига (Ukrainian)
(Croatia) Rijeka	Fiume (Italian*, Hungarian*), Reka (Slovene)*, Riek'a – რიეკა (Georgian*), Rieka (Persian, Kaykavian - Croat), Rijeka (Croatian*, Finnish*, German*, Polish*, Romanian*, Slovak), Rika (Chakavian - Glagolitic), Rykva (early Croatian), St. Veit am Flaum (older German)* Риека (Bulgarian)
(Slovakia) Rimavská Sobota	Großsteffelsdorf (German*), Rimaszombat (Hungarian*), Rimavska Sobota (Latvian*, Lithuanian*, Serbo-Croatian*), Rimavska Sobota — Римавска Собота (Serbian*), Rimavská Sobota (Slovak*), Rymawska Sobota (Polish*)
(Ukraine) Rivne	Rivne – რივნე (Georgian*), Рівне / Rivne (Ukrainian), Rovne - ראָװנע (Yiddish), Rovno (Romanian, Russian), Równe (Polish), Riwne (German), Rowno (older German)
(Croatia) Roč	Castrum Rotium (Latin), Roč (Croatian), Rozzo (Italian), Rotz (German)
(Belgium) Rochefort	Ročfortas (Lithuanian), Rochefort (French*), Rotchfoirt (Walloon*)
(Belgium) Roeselare	Roeselaore (Zeelandic*), Roeselare (Dutch*), Roeseloare (West Flemish*), Roslara (Latin), Roulers (French*, Occitan*), Ruselarė (Lithuanian*), Rūselare (Latvian*)
(Romania) Roman	Roman (Romanian), Románvásár (Hungarian), Romanvarasch (German)
(Belgium) Ronse	Renaix (French*), Rinais (Walloon*), Ronsche (Zeelandic*), Ronse (Dutch*), Ronsė (Lithuanian), Rothnacum (Latin*)
(Italy) Rome	Erroma (Basque)*, Luómǎ - 罗马 (Chinese)*, Rhufain (Welsh), Rim (Croatian*, Serbian, Slovene*), Rím (Slovak)*, Řím (Czech)*, Рим / Rim (Russian, Bulgarian, Serbian), Рим / Rym (Ukrainian), Rzym (Polish)*, Rô-ma or La Mã (Vietnamese, the latter is old-fashioned), An Róimh (Irish), An Ròimh (Scottish Gaelic)*, Rom (Danish*, German*, Swedish*), Róm (Icelandic), Roma (Azeri*, Catalan*, Interlingua, Italian*, Lithuanian*, Latvian*, Norwegian*, Portuguese*, Romanian*, Romansh, Spanish*, Tagalog*, Turkish*), Róma (Hungarian)*, Roma - רומא (Hebrew), Rōma - ローマ (Japanese)*, Roma - 로마 (Korean), Rome (Dutch*, French*, Frisian*), Rome, Roeme, Roame (Limburgish, depending on dialect), Romi – რომი (Georgian*), Rómi - Ρώμη (Greek), Romo (Esperanto), Rooma (Estonian*, Finnish*), Roum (Luxembourgish), Roym - רױם (Yiddish), Ruma (Maltese), Rūmiya (Arabic)
(Denmark) Roskilde	Hróarskelda (Icelandic), Roskilde (Danish, Norwegian, Dutch, Finnish, Swedish, Turkish, Polish)
(Germany) Rostock	Rostock (Estonian, Finnish, German, Romanian, Swedish, Turkish), Rostock / Rostok (Polish), Rostoka (Latvian), Rostokas (Lithuanian), Rostoque (Portuguese)*, Roztoka (former Polish), Roztoky (Czech)
(France) Rouen	Ratumacos (Gaulish), Rotomagus (Latin), Rouaan (Dutch alternate), Rouan (Breton*), Rouen (French, Italian, Romanian), Ruan or Ruán (Spanish)*, Ruão (Portuguese), Ruāna (Latvian), Rúðuborg (Icelandic), Rouenē - Ρουένη (Greek - καθαρεύουσα)
(Finland) Rovaniemi	Roavenjarga (Northern Sami), Rovaniemi (Estonian, Finnish, Swedish, Turkish), Rovaniemis (Lithuanian)
(Croatia) Rovinj	Rovigno (Italian, Venetian), Rovinj (Croatian, Slovene), Ruginium (Latin), Ρυγίνιον - Rygínion (Ancient Greek)
(Slovakia) Rožňava	Rojna (Turkish*), Rojnyava (Azerbaijani*), Rosenau (German*), Rosnavia (Latin), Rožňava (Slovak*), Rožņava (Latvian*), Rožniava (Lithuanian*), Rożniawa (Polish*), Rožnjava (Serbo-Croatian*), Rozsnyó (Hungarian*)
(Slovakia) Ružomberok	Rosenberg (German*), Rózsahegy (Hungarian*), Rujоmbеrоk (Azerbaijani*), Rużomberk (Polish*), Ružomberok (Slovak*), Ružomberoka (Latvian*), Ružomberokas (Lithuanian*)
(Poland) Rzeszów	Reichshof (German 1939–1945), Reisha - רישא (Hebrew), Resche (former German), Řešov (Czech), Resovia (Latin, former Spanish), Reyshe - רײשע (Yiddish), Ryashеv - Ряшев (Russian), Ryashiv (Ukrainian), Rzeszów (Polish), Rzeszůw (Silesian), Žešova (Latvian), Žešuvas (Lithuanian)

== S ==
English name	Other names or former names
(Germany) Saarbrücken	Saarbrécken (Luxembourgish)*, Saarbrücken (German*, Romanian*, Spanish*), Saarbrükken (Azeri)*, Saarbrýken - Σααρμπρύκεν (Greek)*, Sarabrucca (Medieval Latin), Sarbriukenas (Lithuanian)*, Sarrebruck (French*, Spanish [dated]), Zaarbriuk'eni – ზაარბრიუკენი (Georgian*)
(Germany) Saarlouis	Saarlautern (German 1936–1945)*, Saarlouis (German)*, Sarre-Libre (French 1793–1810)*, Sarrelouis (French)*
(Serbia) Šabac	Böğürdelen (Turkish), Šabac (English, Croatian, Bosnian, Slovene), Šabac - Шaбац (Serbian, Macedonian), Schabatz (German), Szabács (Hungarian)
(Slovakia) Sabinov	Сibinium (Latin), Kisszeben (Hungarian*), Sabinov (Slovak*), Sabinova (Latvian*), Sabinovas (Lithuanian*), Zeben (German*)
(Spain) Sagunto	Morvedre (former Catalan), Murviedro (former Spanish), Sagunt (Catalan, German), Sagunto (Italian, Portuguese, Spanish), Saguntum (Latin)
(Slovakia) Šahy	Eipelschlag (German*), Ipolyság (Hungarian*), Šahi (Latvian*), Šahy (Slovak*), Şefradi (Turkish*)
(United Kingdom) (England) St Albans	Verlamchester or Wæclingacaester (Old English), Verlamion (former English), Verulamium (Latin)
(United Kingdom) (Scotland) St Andrews	Cill Rìmhinn (Scottish Gaelic), Kilrymont or Kilrule (former English), Sanct Andraes (Lowland Scots)
(United Kingdom) (Wales) St Asaph	Llanelwy (Welsh)
(United Kingdom) (Wales) St Davids	Menevia (Ecclesiastical Latin, Italian), Mynyw (Middle Welsh), St. Davids (English, German), Saint Ntéibints - Σαιντ Ντέιβιντς (Greek), Tyddewi (Welsh)
(Switzerland) St. Gallen	Saint-Gall (French, Romanian), San Galo (Spanish*), San Gallo (Italian), Sankt Gallen (Dutch, German), São Galo (Portuguese*), Sent-Gâl (Arpitan*), Son Gagl (Romansh), Svatý Havel (Czech)
(Russia) Saint Petersburg	Ayía Petrúpoli - Αγία Πετρούπολη (Greek)*, Cathair Pheadair (Irish), Peterburg and Peyterburg - פּעטערבורג (Yiddish), Peterburi (Estonian), Petroburgo (Esperanto), Petrograd (traditional Serbian, independent of the 1914–1924 renaming)*, Petrohrad (Slovak)*, Petropolis (Latin)*, Pietari (Finnish), Saint-Pétersbourg (French)*, Sangteu Petereubureukeu / Sangt'ŭ P'et'erŭburŭk'ŭ - 상트페테르부르크 (Korean), Sankta Pætursborg or St. Pætursborg (Faroese)*, Sankti Pétursborg (Icelandic)*, Sankt-Peterburg (Croatian*, Sankt-Peterburg - Санкт-Петербург (Russian*), Sankt Peterburg - Санкт Петербург (Serbian)*, Sankt-Peterburg* or Peterburg (Turkish), Sankt Peterburg (Serbo-Croatian*, Slovene*, seldom Slovak), Sanktpēterburga (Latvian), Sankt Peterburgas (Lithuanian), Sankt'-P'et'erburgi - სანქტ-პეტერბურგი (Georgian*), Sankt Petěrburk (Czech), Sankt Petersborg (Danish*, Low German*), Sankt Petersburg (German*, Polish, Romanian, Swedish), Sankt-Pieciarburh - Санкт-Пецярбург (Belarusian), Sankuto Peteruburuku - サンクトペテルブルク (Japanese)*, San Petersburgo (Spanish*, Tagalog*), San Pietroburgo (Italian)*, San Pietruburgu (Maltese), Sānt Bītarsbūrġ - سانت بطرسبرغ (Arabic)*, São Petersburgo (Portuguese)*, Shën Petersburg (Albanian), Shèng Bĭdébāo - 聖彼得堡 (Chinese), Sint-Petersburg (Dutch)*, St. Petersburg (Norwegian)*, Szentpétervár (Hungarian)*, Xanh Pê-téc-bua (Vietnamese) 1638–1703 (a 17th-century town at the site of the present city): Nevanlinna (Finnish), Niyen – Ниен (Russian), Nyen (Swedish) 1914–1924: Petorogurādo - ペトログラード (Japanese), Petrograd (former English, former French, former Russian, former Serbian, former Slovene, former Swedish), Petrogrado (former Spanish, former Portuguese), Petrohrad (former Czech, Slovak), Pietrogrado (former Italian), Piotrogród (former Polish), Pēterpils (former Latvian), Petrapilis (former Lithuanian) 1924–1991: Leningrad (former Czech, former English, former German, former Swedish), Leningrado (former Italian, former Spanish), Leninegrado (former Portuguese), Ленинград - Lenjingrad (former Serbo-Croatian)*, Reningeuradeu / Renin'gŭradŭ - 레닌그라드 (Korean), Reningurādo - レニングラード (Japanese), "Liènínggélè"-列寧格勒 (Chinese)
(Switzerland) St. Moritz	Sanktmorica (Latvian), Sankt Moritz (German)*, Saint-Moritz (French)*, San Maurizio (Italian)*, San Morittsu - サンモリッツ (Japanese)*, San Murezzan (Romansh), Svatý Mořic (Czech)
(Belgium) Saint-Ghislain	Ghislenopolis (Latin), Sen Gislenas (Lithuanian), Saint-Ghislain (French*), Saint-Guilagne (Picard*), Sint-Guilin (Walloon*)
(France) Saint-Quentin	Saint-Quentin (French), San Quintín (Spanish), San Quintino (Italian), Saint-Kintin (Picard), Sint-Kwintens (Dutch)
(Slovakia) Šaľa	Šaľa (Slovak*), Šaļa (Latvian*), Šalia (Lithuanian*), Šalja (Serbo-Croatian*), Sellye (Cebuano*), Şalya (Azerbaijani*), Schelle (German*), Vágsellye (Hungarian*)
(Austria) Salzburg	Jalcheubureukeu / Chalch'ŭburŭk'ŭ - 잘츠부르크 (Korean), Sà'ērzíbăo - 薩爾茨堡 (Chinese), Såizburg (Bavarian), Salisburgo (Italian), Salzbourg (French), Salzburg (Bosnian, Croatian, Finnish, German, Romanian, Serbian, Slovene, Swedish, Turkish), Salzburgo (Portuguese, Spanish), Solnograd (old Slovene), Solnohrad (Czech), Zalcburga (Latvian), Zalcburgas (Lithuanian), Zaltsburgi – ზალცბურგი (Georgian*), Zarutsuburuku - ザルツブルク (Japanese)*
(Russia) Samara	Kujbišev (Slovene, former name), Kuybyshev (former name), Samara – Самара (Russian, Ukrainian, Bulgarian), Samara (German, Azeri), Szamara (Hungarian), Hamar – Һамар (Bashkir*)
(Belgium) Sambreville	Sambreville (French*), Sambveye (Walloon*)
(Slovakia) Šamorín	Šamorín (Slovak*), Şamorin (Azerbaijani*), Šamorīna (Latvian*), Šamorinas (Lithuanian*) Sommerein (German*), Somorja (Hungarian*)
(Romania) Sânnicolau Mare	Groß Sankt Nikolaus or Großsanktnikolaus (German), Nagyszentmiklós (Hungarian), Sânnicolau Mare or Sân Nicolau Mare (Romanian), Sînnicolau Mare (former Romanian), Veliki Sveti Nikola (Serbian)
San Marino	Sant-Marin (Arpitan*), São Marinho or São Marino (Portuguese)*
(Spain) San Sebastián	Donostia (Basque*, Estonian*), Donostia-San Sebastián (official name, combination of the names in both local languages: Donostia (Basque pronunciation: [doˈnos̺tia]) and San Sebastián (Spanish: [san seβasˈtjan])), Donostio (Esperanto)*, Saint-Sébastien (French)*, San Sebastian (most common English variant), San Sebastián (Spanish*, Portuguese*, Finnish*, Romanian), Sant Sebastià (Catalan)*, San Sebastijanas (Lithuanian), São Sebastião (Portuguese variant)*
(Spain) Santiago de Compostela	Compostela (former Galician, current use also), Saint-Jacques-de-Compostelle (French), Santiago de Compostela (Galician, Finnish, Portuguese, Spanish), Santiago de Compostel·la (Catalan), Santiago di Compostela (Italian), Santiago di Compostella or San Giacomo di Compostella (old Italian), Sant Jaume de Galícia (former Catalan), Šānt Yāqūb (Arabic)
(Bosnia and Herzegovina) Sarajevo	Saarayego (Wolof), Sairéavó (Irish), Sàlārèwō - 撒拉熱窩 (Chinese), Saraebo - サラエボ (Japanese)*, Saraevo – სარაევო (Georgian*), Saraewo - Սարաևո (Armenian), Saraievo (Galician, Portuguese, Romanian), Sarajeva (Latvian), Sarajevas (Lithuanian), Sarajevë (Albanian), Sarajevo (Bosnian, Croatian, English, Finnish, French, Italian, Maltese, Portuguese, Slovene, Spanish, Swedish), Sarajevo - Сараjево (Bosnian, Serbian), Sarajevo - Сараево (Belarusian, Bulgarian, Chuvash, Russian, Ossetic, Macedonian, Tatar, Tajik), Sarajevo - Сараєво (Ukrainian), Sarajevó (Icelandic), Sarajewo (German, Lower Sorbian, Polish, Upper Sorbian), Saray (Judaeo-Spanish), Saraybosna (Turkish), Sarayebo - 사라예보 (Korean), Sarayevo (Azeri, Crimean Turkic, Haitian Creole, Kurdi, Swahili), Saráyevo - Σαράγεβο (Greek), Sarayevo - סראייבו (Hebrew), Sarāyīfū or Sarāyēfū - سراييفو (Arabic), Szarajevó (Hungarian), Seraium (Latin), Vrhbosna (former Bosnian and Croatian) Saraj or Saray (Ladino)
(Albania) Saranda	Áyii Saránda – Άγιοι Σαράντα (Greek), Santiquaranta or Santi Quaranta (Italian), Sarandë or Saranda (Albanian)
(France) Sarrebourg	Kaufmanns-Saarbrück (former German)*, Pons Saravi (Latin), Saarburch or Saarbuerj (Rhine Franconian), Saarburg (Dutch, German*), Sarrebourg (French*, German*)
(France) Sarreguemines	Gaemundia or Gaimundia (Latin), Saargemìnn (Rhine Franconian), Saargemünd (German)*, Sarreguemines (French)*
(France) Sartene	Sartè (Corsican), Sartena (Italian), Sartène (French)
(Italy) Sassari	Sáçer (Old Spanish), Sassari (Sassarese, Corsican, Italian), Sássari (Portuguese)*, Sassaro (Old Sassarese), Sàsser (Catalan), Tathari / Tàthari / Tàttari / Tattari (Sardinian)
(Slovakia) Šaštín-Stráže	Schoßberg-Strascha (German*), Šaštīna-Strāže (Latvian*), Šaštín-Stráže (Slovak*), Šaštín-Stráže — Шаштин-Страже (Serbian*), Şaşvar (Turkish*), Sasvár–Morvaőr (Hungarian*)
(France) Saverne	Saverne (French), Zabern (German), Tres Tabernae (Latin)
(Finland) Savonlinna	Savonlinna (Finnish), Nyslott (Swedish)
(Switzerland) Schaffhausen	Šafhauzene (Latvian), Schaffhausen (German, Romanian), Schaffhouse (French), Schaffusa (Romansh), Sciaffusa (Italian), Szafuza (Polish)
(Germany) Schweinfurt	Schweinfurt (German, Romanian, Slovene), Svinibrod (Czech)
(Germany) Schwerin	Schwerin (German), Swaryń (Polish), Zuarin (Obotritic), Zvěřín (Czech)
(Switzerland) Schwyz	Schwytz (French, Finnish), Schwyz (German), Sieviche (Arpitan), Svitto (Italian), Sviz (Romansh)
(Slovakia) Sečovce	Gálszécs (Hungarian*), Sečovce (Slovak*), Sečovce — Сечовце (Serbian*)
(France) Sélestat	Schlettstadt (German)*, Sélestat (French*, German*)
(Slovakia) Senec	Senec (Slovak*), Seneca (Latvian*), Senecas (Lithuanian*), Senjec (Serbo-Croatian*), Senjec — Сењец (Serbian*), Senets (Azerbaijani*), Szenc (Hungarian*), Wartberg (German*)
(Slovakia) Senica	Senica (Slovak*), Senitsa (Azerbaijani*), Senitz (German*), Senjica — Сењица (Serbian*) Szenice (Hungarian*)
(Croatia) Senj	Segna (Italian), Senja or Segnia (Latin), Senj (Croatian, Serbian, Slovene), Zengg (German, former Hungarian)
(Slovakia) Sereď	Sered (Azerbaijani*), Sereď (Slovak*), Sereď — Сеређ (Serbian*), Seredis (Lithuanian*), Seredja (Latvian*), Sereth (German*), Szered (Hungarian*)
(Greece) Serres	Sérres - Σέρρες (Greek), Syar - Сяр / Ser - Сер (Bulgarian), Serez (Turkish)
(Portugal) Setúbal	Saint Ubes (former English), Saint-Yves (former French), Shaṭūbar - شَطُوبَر (Arabic)
(Ukraine) / (Autonomous Republic of Crimea) Sevastopol	Akyar or Sivastopol (Turkish), Aqyar (Crimean Tatar*, Tatar), Sebaseutopol / Sebasŭt'op'ol – 세바스토폴 (Korean)*, Sebastòpol (Catalan), Sébastopol (French), Sebastopol (Spanish, Portuguese, Dutch, former English), Sebastopoli (Italian), Sevastopol (Finnish, Romanian), Sevastopol' – Севастополь (Russian, Ukrainian), Sevastopole (Latvian), Sevastúpoli – Σεβαστούπολη (Greek), Sewastopol (German*, Polish), Szevasztopol (Hungarian), Theoderichshafen (proposed German name during World War II)*
(Spain) Seville	Hispalis (Latin), Išbīliya - إشبيلية (Arabic), Sebiriya – セビリア / Sebīrya - セビーリャ (Japanese)*, Sebiya – 세비야 (Korean), Seviļa (Latvian), Sevila (Slovene), Sevilha (Occitan, Portuguese), Sevilia (former Romanian), Sevilija (Lithuanian), Sevilja (Serbian), Seviljo (Esperanto), Sevilla (Galician, Finnish, German, Hungarian, Irish, Norwegian, Romanian, Slovak, Spanish, Swedish), Séville (French), Sevílli – Σεβίλλη (Greek), Sevilya (Turkish, Azeri), Seviya (Ladino)*, Sewilla (Polish), Siviglia (Italian), Sivilja (Maltese)
(Netherlands) 's-Gravenzande	Gravenzandė (Lithuanian), 's-Gravenzande (Dutch*)
(Netherlands) 's-Heerenberg	Herenbergas (Lithuanian), 's-Eêrenberg (Zeelandic*), 's-Heerenbarg (Low Saxon*), 's-Heerenberg (Dutch*)
(Netherlands) 's-Hertogenbosch	Boé-eul-Duc (Picard), Bolduch (Polish*), Bolduque (Asturian*, Spanish*), Boscoducale (Corsican, Italian*), Bois-le-Duc (French*), Bwès-do-Duk-di-Braibant (Walloon*), De Bosk (Frisian*), Den Bosch (alternative Dutch, Limburgish*), D'n Bos (Zeelandic*), Herzogenbusch (German*), Se Heretogwud (Anglo-Saxon*), 's-Hertogenbosch (Dutch*), Hertogenbosa (Latvian*), Hertogenbosas (Lithuanian*), Silva Ducis (Latin*)
(Albania) Shkodër	Escodra (Portuguese)*, Escútari (Spanish), İşkodra (Turkish), Scodra (Latin), Scutari (French, Italian, old Romanian), Shkodër (Albanian), Skadar (Czech, Serbian, Slovene), Skódhra – Σκόδρα (Greek), Skutari (German), Szkodra (Polish)
(United Kingdom) (England) Shrewsbury	Amwythig, sometimes rendered Yr Amwythig (Welsh)
(Lithuania) Šiauliai	Šauļi (Latvian), Šaŭli – Шаўлі (Belarusian), Schaulen (German), Shavl – שאַװל (Yiddish), Shavli – Шавли (Russian), Shiauliai – შიაულიაი (Georgian*), Šiauliai (Lithuanian, Finnish), Szawle (Polish)
(Croatia) Šibenik	Sebenico (former Hungarian, Italian), Šibenik (Croatian, Serbian, Slovene), Szybenik (Polish)
(Romania) Sibiu	Hermannstadt (German)*, Nagyszeben (Hungarian)*, Sibiň (Czech)*, Sibinj – Сибињ (Serbian), Sibiu (German*, Romanian*, Finnish*, Turkish*), Sybin (Polish)*
(Poland) Siedlce	Sedlets - Седлец (Russian), Shedlets – שעדלעץ (Yiddish), Siedlce (Polish)
(Italy) Siena	Sena (former Portuguese, former Spanish), Siena (Dutch, Galician, German, Italian, Lithuanian, Polish, Portuguese, Romanian, Slovene, Spanish, Turkish), Siena – 시에나 (Korean), Sienna (English variant), Sienne (French)
(Romania) Sighetu Marmației	Máramarossziget or Sziget (Hungarian)*, Maramureschsigeth / Siget / Sighetu Marmației (German)*, Marmarošská Sihoť or Sighetu Marmației (Czech)*, Ostrovu Marmației (medieval name), Siget Marmaćej or Siget (Croatian, Serbian)*, Siget - סיגעט (Yiddish)*, Sighet (former English)*, Sighetu Marmației (Dutch*, Portuguese*), Sighetu Marmației or Sighet (Italian)*, Sighetu Marmației or Sighetul Marmației (French)*, Sighetu Marmației or Sighetul Marmației or Sighet (Romanian)*, Sihoť or Syhoty (Slovak), Sihota (Rusyn), Syhit – Сигіт or Syhit-Marmaros'kyy – Сигіт-Мармароський (Ukrainian)*, Syhot Marmaroski or Sygiet (Polish)*
(Romania) Sighișoara	Schäßburg (German)*, Segesvár (Hungarian)*, Sighișoara (German*, Romanian*), Sigiszoara (Polish)*
(Ukraine) / (Autonomous Republic of Crimea) Simferopol	Akmescit (Turkish), Aqmescit (Crimean Tatar*, Tatar*), Gotenburg (proposed German name during World War II), Simferòpol (Catalan), Simferopol (Romanian), Simferopol' – Симферополь (Russian), Simferopol' – Сімферополь (Ukrainian), Simferopole (Latvian), Simferopoli or Sinferopoli (Italian), Symferopol (Polish), Symferoúpoli – Συμφερούπολη (Greek), Szimferopol (Hungarian)
(Belgium) Sint-Truiden	Oppidum Sancti Trudonis (Latin)*, Saint-Trond (French)*, Sent-Trüden (Azeri)*, Sinttreidena (Latvian)*, Sint Treidenas (Lithuanian)*
(Slovakia) Skalica	Sakolcium (Latin*), Skalica (Slovak*), Skalica – Скалица (Serbian*), Skalïca – Скалица (Kazakh), Skalitsa (Azerbaijani*), Skalitz (German*), Szakolca (Hungarian*)
(Sweden) Skellefteå	Heletti (Meänkieli), Šeleftėjas (Lithuanian), Šellefteo (Latvian), Shelefteo – Шелефтео (Bulgarian, Serbian), Shellefteo – Шеллефтео (Russian, Ukrainian), Sherefuteo – シェレフテオ (Japanese), Skellefteå (Swedish), Skillehte (Southern Sami), Syöldate (Ume Sami)
(North Macedonia) Skopje	Escópia (Portuguese)*, Scóipé (Irish), Scoplie (Romanian variant), Scupi (Latin), Seukope / Sŭk'op'e – 스코페 (Korean), Shkupi (Albanian), Skop'e – Скопье (Russian), Skópia – Σκόπια (Greek), Skopie – Скопие (Bulgarian), Sk'op'ie – სკოპიე (Georgian*), Skopie (Polish, Spanish), Skopje (Czech, Dutch, German, Latvian, Maltese, Portuguese, Slovene, Romanian, Swedish), Skopjė (Lithuanian), Skopje – Скопје (Macedonian), Skoplje (Serbian, Croatian), Skūbyī - إسكوبية (Arabic), Sukopie – スコピエ (Japanese)*, Szkopje (Hungarian), Usküb (English in the 11th Edition of Encyclopædia Britannica), Üsküb (Ottoman Turkish), Üsküp (Turkish), Üszküp (historical Hungarian)
(Poland) Skwierzyna	Schwerin an der Warthe (German)
(Slovakia) Sládkovičovo	Diosek (German*, archaic Slovak*), Diószeg (Hungarian*), Sládkovičovo (Slovak*), Slādkovičovo (Latvian*)
(Ukraine) Slavske	Slavs'ke – Славське (Ukrainian), Slawsko (Polish)
(Germany) Sleswick	Schleswig (German), Sleeswijk (Dutch), Slesvig (Danish* Norwegian*), Šlēsviga (Latvian), Sleswig (Low German), Slaswik (North Frisian (Mooring))
(Slovakia) Sliač	Sliač (Slovak*), Sliatsch (German*), Sljač (Serbo-Croatian*), Sljač – Сљач (Serbian*), Sljača (Latvian*), Szliács (Hungarian*)
(Republic of Ireland) Sligo	Sligeach (Irish)
(Netherlands) Sluis	l'Écluse (French), Esclusa (Spanish), Sluis (Dutch), Sluys (Swedish)
(Poland) Słupsk	Slupsk - Слупск (Russian and other languages written in Cyrillic script), Slupska (Latvian), Stolp (German), Stolpe (Latin), Stölpe (Swedish), Stôłpsk (Kashubian)
(Russia) Smolensk	Esmolensco (Portuguese, rare)*, Smalensk – Смаленск (Belarusian), Smolensk – Смоленск (Russian), Smolensk (Azeri, Dutch, French, German, Portuguese, Romanian), Smoleńsk (Polish), Smoļenska (Latvian), Smolenskas (Lithuanian), Szmolenszk (Hungarian)
(Slovakia) Snina	Snina (Slovak*), Snjina (Serbo-Croatian*), Szinna (Hungarian*)
(Slovakia) Sobrance	Sobrance (Slovak*), Sobranz (German*), Szobránc (Hungarian*)
(Sweden) Södertälje	Nán Tàilìyē – 南泰利耶 (Chinese), Södertälje (Swedish), Telga australis (Latin)
(Belgium) Soignies	Soignies (French*), Sunniacum (Latin), Sougniye (Picard*, Walloon*), Zinnik (Dutch*, Limburgish*, Zeelandic*)
(Croatia) Solin	Salona (Dutch, Italian), Solin (Croatian, Slovene)
(Bulgaria) Sofia	Safija – Сафія (Belarusian), Sardaki - Сардакіи (former Bulgarian), Serdikḗ / Serdikí - Σερδική or Serdṓn pólis - Σερδών πόλις or Triádhitza - Τριάδιτζα (former Greek), Sófia – Σόφια (Greek), Sófia (Portuguese), Sofia (Danish, Dutch, Finnish, French, German, Italian, Polish, Romanian, Swedish), Sofia – ソフィア (Japanese)*, Sofía (Spanish), Sofiya – София (Bulgarian, Russian, Serbian, Macedonian), Sofiya – Софія (Ukrainian), Sofija (Croatian, Slovene, Latvian, Lithuanian), Sofio (Esperanto), Sofiya (Azeri), Sofja (Maltese), Sofya (Turkish), Sóifia (Irish), Sopia – სოფია (Georgian*), Sopia / Sop'ia – 소피아 (Korean), Sredets - Срѣдєцъ (Old Slavic, former Bulgarian), Sūfiyā (Arabic), Suofeiya - 索菲亞 (Chinese), Szófia (Hungarian), Ulpia Serdica (Latin)
(Switzerland) Solothurn	Salôrro (Arpitan*), Soletta (Italian), Soleura (Portuguese)*, Soleure (French), Solothurn (Dutch, German), Soloturn (Romansh), Solura (Polish)
(Denmark) Sønderborg	Sonderburg (German)
(Italy) Sondrio	Sondrio (Italian), Sunder (Romansh), Sùndri (Lombard), Sundrium (Latin)
(Poland) Sopot	Sopòt (Kashubian), Sopot (Polish), Sopota (Latvian), Zoppot (German)
(Hungary) Sopron	Ödenburg (German), Sopron (Hungarian, Romanian), Šopron (Croatian), Šoproň (Slovak, Czech)
(Sweden) Sorsele	Sorsele (Swedish), Suarsa (Southern Sami), Suarssá (Ume Sami)
(Russia) Sovetsk	Sovetsk – Советск (Russian), Sovetska (Latvian), Sovjetsk (Serbian, Slovene), Sovyetsk (Turkish), Tilsit (German), Tilžė (Lithuanian), Tilzīte (former Latvian), Tylża (Polish)
(Belgium) Spa	Aquae Luvienses Tungrorum (alternative Latin), Aquae Spadanae (Latin*), Spa (French*), Spå (Walloon*), Vicus Spadanus (alternative Latin)
(Greece) Sparta	Esparta (Spanish), Lacédémone (French variant), Lakedaimṓn - Λακεδαιμών or Lakedaimonía - Λακεδαιμονία (Ancient Greek variant), Spártā - Σπᾰ́ρτᾱ (Doric), Spártē / Spárti Σπάρτη (Modern Greek, most dialects of Ancient Greek), Sparte (French)
(Germany) Speyer	Espira (Spanish, Portuguese), Spiers (Dutch), Spira (Italian, Polish), Spire (French), Spires (former English), Špýr (Czech), Shapira שפירא (Hebrew), Shapiro שפירא (Yiddish),
(Slovakia) Spišská Belá	Biała Spiska (Polish*), Spiška Bela (Serbo-Croatian*), Spišská Belá (Slovak*), Spišska Bela (Latvian*), Szepesbéla (Hungarian*), Zipser Bela (German*)
(Slovakia) Spišská Nová Ves	Igló (Hungarian*), Noveysis (Romani), Nowa Wieś Spiska (Polish*), Spiška Nova Ves (Serbo-Croatian*), Spiška Nova Ves – Спишка Нова Вес (Serbian*), Spišská Nová Ves (Slovak*), Spişskа Nоvа Vеs (Azerbaijani*), Spišska Nova Vesa (Latvian*), Spišska Nova Vesė (Lithuanian*), Villa Nova (Latin), (Zipser) Neu(en)dorf (German*)
(Slovakia) Spišská Stará Ves	Antiqua Villa (Latin), Golembarg (Goral), Ófalu (alternative Hungarian), Spiška Stara Ves (Serbo-Croatian*), Spišská Stará Ves (Slovak*), Spišska Stara Vesa (Latvian*), Stara Wieś Spiska (Polish*), Szepesófalu (Hungarian*), (Zipser) Alt(en)dorf (German*)
(Slovakia) Spišské Podhradie	Kirchdrauf (German*), Spiskie Podgrodzie (Polish*), Spišské Podhradie (Slovak*), Spišske Podhradje (Latvian*), Szepesváralja (Hungarian*)
(Slovakia) Spiśské Vlachy	Spiśské Vlachy (Slovak*), Spišske Vlahi (Latvian*), Spiške Vlahi (Serbo-Croatian*), Spiskie Włochy (Polish*), Szepesolaszi (Hungarian*), Villa Latina (Latin), Wallendorf (German*)
(Croatia) Split	Aspalathos - Ἀσπάλαθος (Ancient Greek), Aspalatum (Latin), Seupeulliteu / Sŭp'ŭllit'ŭ – 스플리트 (Korean), Spalato (former Hungarian, Italian), Spalatum (Latin), Split (Azeri, Croatian, Dutch, Finnish, German, Polish, Portuguese, Romanian, Serbian, Slovene, Spanish, Turkish), Splita (Latvian), Splitas (Lithuanian), Sp'lit'i – სპლიტი (Georgian*), Spolato - Σπολάτο (Greek Katharevousa)
(Germany) Spreewald	Błota (Lower Sorbian), Spreewald (German)
(Germany) Spremberg	Grodk (Lower Sorbian), Spremberg (German)
(Slovakia) Stará Ľubovňa	Altlublau (German*), Lublovia (Latin), Lubowla (Polish*), Ólubló (Hungarian*), Stara Liubovnia (Lithuanian*), Stara Ljubovnja (Serbo-Croatian*), Stará Ľubovňa (Slovak*), Stara Ļubovņa (Latvian*) Stara Lyubovnya (Azerbaijani*)
(Slovakia) Stará Turá	Altturn (German*), Ótura (Hungarian*), Stara Tura (Latvian*, Lithuanian*), Stará Turá (Slovak*)
(Poland) Stargard	Ščecino Stargardas (former Lithuanian), Stargard (English, Dutch, French, German, Italian, Polish, Portuguese, Spanish, Turkish), Stargard - Στάργκαρντ (Greek), Stargard - Старгард (Russian), Stargard - Старгард (Ukrainian) Stargard in Pommern or Stargard an der Ihna (German), Stargarda (Latvian), Stargardas (Lithuanian), Stargarda Ščeciņska (former Latvian), Stargardia (Latin), Stargard Ščecin'ski - Старгард Щециньски (former Russian), Stargard Ščecin'skyj - Старгард Щецінський (former Ukrainian), Stárgard Setséttsinski - Στάργκαρντ Σετσέτσινσκι (former Greek), Stargard Szczeciński (former Polish, official name of the city 1945–2015), Stôrgard (Kashubian, Pomeranian)
(Ukraine) Starokonstantinov	Alt-Konstantin (German), Old Constantine (former English), Starokonstantinov - Староконстантинов (Russian), Starokostyantyniv Старокостянтинів (Ukrainian), Starokonstantynów and Konstantynów (Polish)
(Belgium) Stavelot	Stabelaco (Latin), Stablo (German*), Stavelot (French*), Stavelotas (Lithuanian), Ståvleu (Walloon*)
(Azerbaijan) Stepanakert	Estepanaquerte (Portuguese)*, Hankendi (Turkish), Stepanakert - Ստեփանակերտ (Armenian), Xankendi (Azeri)
(Italy) Sterzing-Vipiteno	Stérzen or Sterzinga (former Italian), Sterzing (German), Vipiteno (Italian)
(North Macedonia) Štip	Štip (English, Croatian, Bosnian, Slovene), Štip - Штип (Serbian, Macedonian)
(Sweden) Stockholm	Estocolm (Catalan), Estocolmo (Arpitan, Galician, Portuguese, Spanish), Estokolmo (Tagalog*), Holmia (Latin), Istūkhūlm (Arabic), Sa-tok-home – สตอกโฮล์ม (Thai)*, Seutokholleum / Sŭt'okhollŭm – 스톡홀름 (Korean), Sīdégē'ěrmó – 斯德哥爾摩 (Chinese)*, Stoccolma (Italian), Stockhoalmma (Lule Sami), Stockholbma (Northern Sami), Stockholm (Basque, Danish, Dutch, Estonian, German, Hungarian, Norwegian, Romanian, Slovene, Swedish), Stócólm (Irish), Stoc Tholm (Scottish Gaelic, archaic), Stokgol'm - Стокгольм (Russian), Stokholm (Albanian, Azeri, former Estonian, Serbian, Turkish), Stokholm – Стокхолм (Bulgarian), Štokholm (Slovak), Štokholm – שטאָקהאָלם (Yiddish), Stokhol'm (Ukrainian), Stokholma (Latvian), Stokholmas (Lithuanian), St'ok'holmi – სტოკჰოლმი (Georgian*), Stokholmi (Meänkieli), Stokholmo (Esperanto), Stokkhol (Elfdalian), Stokkhólmi – Στοκχόλμη (Greek), Stokkhólmur (Faroese, Icelandic), Stokkolma (Maltese), Stokxolm (Finnish Kalo), Stuehkie (Southern Sami), Sutokkuhorumu – ストックホルム (Japanese)*, Sztokholm (Polish), Tjåsskasulla (Ume Sami), Tukholma (Finnish, Inari Sami), Tukholmi (alternative Meänkieli)
(Sweden) Storuman	Luspie (Southern Sami), Lusspie (Ume Sami), Storuman (Swedish)
(Germany) Stralsund	Stralsund (German, Swedish), Stralsunda (Italian), Štrālzunde (Latvian), Strzałowo or Strzałów (Polish)
(France) Strasbourg	Estrasburg (Catalan), Estrasburgo (Portuguese, Spanish), Schdroosburi or Strossburi (Alsatian), Seuteuraseubureu / Sŭt'ŭrasŭburŭ – 스트라스부르 (Korean), Straasburch (Frisian), Straatsburg (Afrikaans and Dutch), Strasborg (Scottish Gaelic), Strasbourg (French, Norwegian, Romanian, Slovene, Swedish), Strasbūra (Latvian), Strasbūras (Lithuanian), Strasburg (Polish), Štrasburg (Slovak), St'rasburgi – სტრასბურგი (Georgian*), Strasburgo (Esperanto, Italian),Strasburgu (Maltese), Štrasburk (Czech), Strassburg (Finnish, Swiss German, former Swedish), Straßburg (German), Strasvúrgo – Στρασβούργο (Greek), Strazbur (Serbian), Strazburg (Turkish), Stroossbuerg (Luxembourgish), Sutorasubūru – ストラスブール (Japanese)*
(Germany) Straubing	Straubing (German), Štrubina (Czech)
(Slovakia) Strážske	Őrmező (Hungarian*), Straschke (German*), Straşske (Azerbaijani*), Straške (Serbo-Croatian*), Straške – Страшке (Serbian*), Strážske (Slovak*), Strāžske (Latvian*)
(Sweden) Strömsund	Straejmie (Southern Sami), Strömsund (Swedish)
(Slovakia) Stropkov	Stropkov (Slovak*), Stropkov – Стропков (Serbian*), Stropkova (Latvian*), Stropkovas (Lithuanian*), Stroppkau (German*), Sztropkó (Hungarian*)
(North Macedonia) Struga	Struga (English, Croatian, Bosnian, Slovene), Struga - Струга (Macedonian, Serbian), Strugë (Albanian)
(North Macedonia) Strumica	Strumica (English, Croatian, Bosnian, Slovene), Strumica - Струмица (Macedonian, Serbian)
(Slovakia) Stupava	Stampfen (German*), Stomfa (Hungarian*), Stupava (Slovak*)
(Slovakia) Štúrovo	Gockern (German*), Parkan (former Slovak), Párkány (Hungarian*), Šturovo (Serbo-Croatian*), Štúrovo (Slovak*), Štūrovo (Latvian*), Štūrovas (Lithuanian*)
(Germany) Stuttgart	Schduagert (Swabian German)*, Estugarda (Portuguese), Shututtogaruto - シュトゥットガルト (Japanese)*, Štíhrad (Czech), Stoccarda (Italian), Stoutgárdhi – Στουτγάρδη (Greek), Štutgartas (Lithuanian), Štutgarte (Latvian), Stuttgart (Brazilian Portuguese, Dutch, Finnish, French, German, Norwegian, Romanian, Slovene, Spanish, Swedish, Turkish), Syututeugareuteu / Syut'ut'ŭgarŭt'ŭ - 슈투트가르트 (Korean)
(Serbia) Subotica	Mariatheresiopel (German), Subotica (Finnish, Slovene, Polish, Romanian), Subotica – Суботица (Serbian), Szabadka (Hungarian)
(Romania) Suceava	Sedschopff (archaic German), Shots/Shatz – שאָץ (Yiddish), Sotschen (archaic German), Sučava - Сучава (Russian, Ukrainian), Suceava (Romanian), Suczawa (Polish, German), Sutschawa (German), Sūqiàwǎ - 蘇恰瓦 (Mandarin Chinese), Szucsáva (Hungarian)
(Sweden) Sundsvall	Sjädtavallie (Southern Sami), Soúntsval – Σούντσβαλ (Greek), Sundsvall (Danish, Norwegian, Swedish)
(Croatia) Supetar	San Pietro di Brazza (Italian)
(Slovakia) Šurany	Nagysurány (Hungarian*), Schuran (German*), Šuranai (Lithuanian*), Šurani (Latvian*), Šurany (Slovak*), Veľké Šurany (archaic Slovak)
(Slovakia) Svätý Jur	Sanct Georgius (Latin), Sankt Georgen (German*), Svätý Jur (Slovak*), Sveti Jura (Latvian*), Svətı Yur (Azerbaijani), Sviati Juras (Lithuanian*), Szentgyörgy (Hungarian*)
(Lithuania) Švenčionys	Święciany (Polish), Svianciany - Свянця́ны (Belarusian), Swentzian - סווענציאן (Yiddish)
(North Macedonia) Sveti Nikole	Sveti Nikole (English, Croatian, Bosnian), Sveti Nikole - Свети Николе (Macedonian, Serbian)
(Slovakia) Svidník	Felsővízköz (Hungarian*), Oberswidnik (German*), Svidník (Slovak*), Svidnīka (Latvian*), Svidnjik (Serbo-Croatian*), Svidnjik – Свидњик (Serbian*), Svidnykas (Lithuanian*)
(Slovakia) Svit	Batas (Vlax Romani*), Svit (Slovak*), Svit – Свит (Serbian*), Svita (Latvian*), Świt (Polish*), Szvit (Hungarian*)
(United Kingdom) (Wales) Swansea	Abertaŭo (Esperanto), Abertawe (Welsh), Swansea (Dutch, German, Slovene), Suonsi – სუონსი (Georgian*), Svonsi (Serbian)
(Poland) Świnoujście	Swinemünde (German), Świnoujście (Polish), Svinoústí or Ústí nad Svinou (Czech)
(Italy) Syracuse	Saraùsa (Sicilian), Sioracús (Irish), Siracusa (Italian, Romanian, Portuguese, Spanish, Catalan), Siracuza (former Romanian), Siragüza (Arabic), Syrákousai – Συράκουσαι (Ancient Greek), Sirakoúses – Συρακούσες (Greek), Syrakus (German), Syrakusa (Finnish, Swedish), Syrakuse (Dutch), Sirakuso (Esperanto), Sirakuza (Azeri, Serbian), Sirakuża (Maltese), Siraküza (Turkish), Sirakūzai (Lithuanian), Sirakuze (Slovene), Syrakuzy (Polish), Syrakúzy (Slovak), Syrakusy or Syrákúsy (Czech)*
(Poland) Szczebrzeszyn	Shebreshin – שעברעשין (Yiddish), Szczebrzeszyn (Polish)
(Poland) Szczecin	Estetino (Portuguese, Spanish), Šćećin (Serbian), Ščecin – Шчэцін (Belarusian), Ščecina (Latvian), Scecinum or Stetinum (Latin), Štětín (Czech), Štetín (Slovak, Slovene), Štetinas (Lithuanian), Stettijn (old Dutch), Stettin (German, Danish, Norwegian, Swedish, former English), Stettíno - Στεττίνο (Greek), Stettino (Italian), Stettyn (Afrikaans), Syuchechin / Syuch'ech'in – 슈체친 (Korean)*, Szczecin (Polish, Romanian), Şetsin (Azeri)*
(Poland) Szczytno	Ortelsburg (German), Ortulfsburg (older German), Szczytno (Polish)
(Hungary) Szeged	Partiscum (Latin), Segedín (Czech, Serbian, Slovak), Segedin (Turkish), Segedyn or Szegedyn (Polish), Seghedin (Romanian), Seghedino (Italian), Szeged (Hungarian), Szegedin or Segedin (German), Siget (Croatian)
(Hungary) Székesfehérvár	Alba Regia (Latin, Spanish), İstolni Belgrad (Turkish), Stoličný Bělehrad (Czech), Stoličný Belehrad (Slovak), Stolni Beograd - Столни Београд (Serbian), Stolni Biograd (Croatian), Stuhlweißenburg (German)
(Hungary) Szentendre	Sentandreja – Сентандреја (Serbian), Svatý Ondřej (Czech), Szentendre (Hungarian)
(Hungary) Szombathely	Kamenec (Czech), Kamenica (Slovak), Sambotel (Croatian), Savaria or Sabaria (Latin), Sombotel (Slovene), Steinamanger (German), Szombathely (Hungarian)

== T ==
English name	Other names or former names
(Estonia) Tallinn	Castrum Danorum (Latin, 13th century), Kolyvan - Колывань (in Old East Slavic chronicles, whose authenticity and connection with modern Tallinn is disputed), Lindanäs (late medieval Swedish, attested after the Livonian Crusade), Lyndanisse (late medieval Danish, attested in the 13th century), Rääveli (former Finnish), Reval (former Danish, Dutch, English, French, German, Norwegian, Swedish and Turkish), Revalia (former Latin), Revel' - Ревель (former Russian), Rēvele (former Latvian), Revl - רעוול (Yiddish), Rewal / Rewel (former Polish), Taillinn (Irish), Tālīn - تالين (Arabic), Tǎlín - 塔林 (Chinese), Talin or Taline (alternative Portuguese, Serbo-Croatian, Slovenian, alternative Turkish), Talinas (Lithuanian), T'alini – ტალინი (Georgian*), Tallin (Spanish), Tallin was also the alternative transliteration variant of Таллин (Russian) used in many languages during the second half of the 20th century, Tallin / T'allin - 탈린 (Korean), Tallíni - Ταλλίνη (Greek Katharevousa), Tallinn (Azeri, Basque, Catalan, Danish, Dutch, Estonian, French, German, Italian, Maltese, Norwegian, Polish, Portuguese, Romanian, Slovak, Swedish and Turkish), Talinny (Hungarian), Tallina (Latvian), Tallinna (Finnish, former Estonian), Tarin - タリン (Japanese)*
(Finland) Tampere	Tammerfors (Danish, Norwegian, Swedish), Tampere (Azeri, Estonian, Finnish, Latvian, Portuguese, Romanian, Turkish), Tampere / T'amp'ere - 탐페레 (Korean), Tamperė (Lithuanian)
(Italy) Taranto	Taranto (Italian, Romanian), Táras - Τάρας (Ancient Greek), Tárantas - Τάραντας (Modern Greek), Tàrent (Catalan), Tarent (Czech, German, Polish, Romanian variant, Serbian), Tarente (French), Tarento (Portuguese*, Spanish), Tarentum (Latin)
(Romania) Târgu Mureș	Marosvásárhely (Hungarian*),^{[KNAB]} Maroš Vazargeli - Марошъ Вазаргели (archaic Russian),^{[KNAB]} Neumarkt (am Mieresch) (German), Nový Trh (nad Máruši) (alternative Czech),^{[KNAB]} Oșorhei (archaic Romanian),^{[KNAB]} Târgu Mureș (Romanian, current spelling), Tîrgu Mureș (Romanian, old spelling), Tyrgu-Mureš - Тиргу-Муреш (Ukrainian*), Tyrgu-Mureš - Тыргу-Муреш (Russian*)^{[KNAB]}
(Romania) Târgu Neamț	Németvásár (Hungarian), Târgu Neamț (Romanian, current spelling), Tîrgu Neamț (Romanian, old spelling)
(Romania) Târgu Ocna	Aknavásár (Hungarian), Târgu Ocna (Romanian, current spelling), Tîrgu Ocna (Romanian, old spelling)
(Romania) Târgu Jiu	Târgu Jiu (Romanian, current spelling), Tergoschwyl (German), Tîrgu Jiu (Romanian, old spelling), Zsilvásárhely (Hungarian)
(Poland) Tarnów	Tarne - טארנע (Yiddish), Tarniv - Тарнів (Ukrainian), Tarnów (Polish)
(Poland) Tarnowskie Góry	Tarnovice (archaic Czech), Tarnovske-Gury - Тарновске-Гуры (Russian*), Tarnovské Hory (archaic Czech), Tarnovs'ki Hury - Тарновські Гури (Ukrainian*), Tarnowitz (German), Tarnowske Gůry (Silesian*), Tarnowskie Góry (Polish)
(Spain) Tarragona	Tarraco (Latin), Tarragona (Catalan, Spanish, English), Tarragone (French), Tarraquna (Arabic)
(Estonia) Tartu	Dorpat (former German, Polish, Swedish, Latin; and Russian transcription Дерпт), Tarbatu (Ancient Estonian), Tarto (Võro), Tartto (Finnish), Tartu (Estonian, German, Latvian, Romanian, Russian, Swedish, Turkish), Tērbata (Latvian, before 1918), Tarbata / Tharbata, Tarbatum / Tharbatum (Latin), Yur'yev - Юрьев (former Russian)
(Italy) Tarvisio	Tarvis (Friulian, German), Tarvisio (Italian), Trbiž (Slovene)
(Lithuania) Tauragė	Tauragė (Lithuanian),^{[KNAB]} Tauraģe (Latvian*),^{[KNAB]} Tauragie (Samogitian*), Tauroggen (German),^{[KNAB]} Taurogi (Polish*),^{[KNAB]} Таўрогі (alternative Belarusian*), Taurogy (alternative Czech),^{[KNAB]} Tovrik - טאווריק (Yiddish)
(Turkey) Tekirdağ	Bisánthe - Βισάνθη or Bysánthe - Βυσάνθη (Ancient Greek name of a Thracian town very near the modern city), Raedestus / Rhaedestus (Latin), Rhaidestós - Ῥαιδεστός (Greek), Rodosçuk (early Ottoman Turkish), Rodosto (Italian and various European languages), Rodostó (Hungarian), Tekfurdağı (late Ottoman Turkish), Tekirdağ (Turkish), Visánthi - Βισάνθη (Modern Greek form of Bisánthe)
(Italy) Tempio Pausania	Tempio (Spanish, Catalan, former Italian), Tempio Pausania (Italian), Tempiu (Corsican, Sardinian)
(Czech Republic) Terezín	Terezín (Czech, Slovak), Terezin (Polish), Tirisino (Italian), Theresienstadt (German)
(Ukraine) Ternopil	Tarnopil - Тарнопіль (Ukrainian until 1944), Tarnopol (German, Polish), Tarnopolis (Latin), Ternopal - Тэрнопаль (Belarusian), Ternopil (Czech, Turkish, Ukrainian), Ternopiľ (Slovak), T'ernop'ili – ტერნოპილი (Georgian*), Ternopilj (Croatian)
(North Macedonia) Tetovo	Tetovo (English, Serbian, Croatian, Bosnian, Slovene), Tetovo - Тетово (Macedonian), Kalkandelen (Turkish), Tetovë (Albanian)
(Netherlands) The Hague	Ang Haya (Tagalog*), An Háig (Irish), De Haach (West Frisian), De Haag (local Haags dialect), Den Haag or 's-Gravenhage (Dutch), Den Haag or der Haag (German), Den Haag (Indonesian), D'n 'Aegt (Zeelandic), Gaaga - Гаага (Russian), Haag (Croatian, Czech, Danish, Estonian, Finnish, Slovak, Slovene, Swedish), Haaga – ჰააგა (Georgian*), Haaga - Гааґа (Ukrainian), Hag (Serbian), Hāga (Latvian), Haga (Polish, Romanian, Lithuanian, Albanian), Hága (Hungarian), Hago (Esperanto), Hāgu - ハーグ (Japanese)*, Haia (Portuguese), Hǎiyá - 海牙 (Chinese), Ηáyi - Χάγη (Greek), Heigeu / Heigŭ - 헤이그 (Korean), Lāhāy - لاهاي (Arabic), La Hay or La Haye (Vietnamese), La Haya (Spanish), La Haye (French), Lahey (Turkish), L'Aia (Italian), L-Aja (Maltese), L’Hage (Arpitan*)
(Greece) Thessaloniki	Salonic (Romanian), Salonica (alternative English name, Arpitan*), Salónica (Portuguese, Spanish), Salonicco or Tessalonica (Italian), Salonik (alternative Ladino*), Sālōnīk - سالونيك (Arabic), Salonika (Ladino*), Salonikai (Lithuanian), Saloniki - Σαλονίκη (Azeri, alternative German, alternative Greek name, alternative Ladino, Latvian, Polish), Salonik'i - სალონიკი or Tesalonik'i - თესალონიკი (Georgian*), Saloniki - Салоники (Russian), Saloniki or Thessaloniki (Swedish), Saloniky - Салоніки (Ukrainian), Salonique or Thessalonique (French), Salonka (Maltese), Sãrunã (Aromanian), Săruna (Megleno-Romanian), Selanik (alternative Ladino*, Turkish, Albanian), Solun - Солун (Bosnian, Bulgarian, Croatian, Macedonian, Serbian, Slovene), Soluň (Czech), Sołuń (Polish, historical), Solún (Slovak), Szaloniki or Tesszaloniki (Hungarian), Teasaloinicé (Irish), Tesalloniki / T'esallonik'i - 테살로니키 (Korean), Tesalonic (alternative Romanian name), Tesalonica (Tagalog*), Tesalónica (alternative Spanish), Tesalonika (Indonesian), Tesaloniki (alternative Polish), Tessalónica or Tessalônica (alternative Portuguese), Tessalònica (Catalan), Tessaloniki (Finnish), Thessaloniki (German), Thessaloníki - Θεσσαλονίκη (Greek)
(France) Thionville	Diddenuewen (Luxembourgish), Diedenhofen (German), Diedenhoven (former Dutch), Thionville (French)
(Belgium) Thuin	Thuin (French*), Thudinium Castellum (Latin), Twin (Picard*, Walloon*)
(Switzerland) Thusis	Thusis (German), Tusaun (Romansh)
(Belgium) Tielt	Tielt (Dutch*, French*), Tieltas (Lithuanian), Thielt (alternative French), Thillae (Latin)
(Belgium) Tienen	Thenae (alternative Latin), Thenis Mons (Latin*), Tienae (alternative Latin), Tienen (Dutch*), Tiene (Limburgish*), Tîlmont (Walloon), Tirlemont (French*), Tynenas (Lithuanian)
(Slovakia) Tisovec	Taxovia (Latin), Theißholz (German*), Tisofça (Turkish*), Tisovec (Slovak*), Tisoveca (Latvian*), Tiszolc (Hungarian*)
(Romania) Timișoara	Temešvár (Czech, Slovak), Temesvár (Hungarian), Temeşvar (Turkish), Temeswar (Temeschwar) or Temeschburg (German), Temišvar (Croatian, Serbian, Slovene), Temshvar - טמשוואר (Yiddish), Timișoara (Romanian), T'imishoara – ტიმიშოარა (Georgian*), Timiszoara (Polish)
(Republic of Ireland) Tipperary	Tiobraid Árann (Irish)
(Albania) Tirana	Tiorána (Irish), Tiran (Turkish), Tirana (Azeri, Catalan, Finnish, Italian*, Maltese, Portuguese, Romanian, Serbian, Spanish, Swedish), T'irana – ტირანა (Georgian*), Tírana - Τίρανα (Greek), Tirana - ティラナ (Japanese)*, Tirana / T'irana - 티라나 (Korean), Tirāna (Latvian), Tirana - Тирана (Russian, Ukrainian), Tiranë / Tirana (Albanian), Trnava - Трнава (old Macedonian)
(Moldova) / (Transnistria) Tiraspol	Tiráspol (Portuguese)*, Tiraspol - Тирасполь (Russian), Tyraspol - Тирасполь (Ukrainian), Tirișpolea (Romanian)
(Slovakia) Tlmače	Garamtolmács (Hungarian*), Talmach (German*), Tlmače (Slovak*)
(Spain) Toledo	Tolède (French), Toledo (Basque, Catalan, Danish, Dutch, German, Italian, Ladino, Portuguese, Romanian, Spanish, Turkish), Toletum (Latin), Ṭulayṭulaḧ طليطلة (Arabic), Tolédo Τολέδο (Greek), Toldoth טולדות (Hebrew)
(Belgium) Tongeren	Atuatuca Tungrorum (Latin*), Tóngere (Limburgish*), Tongeren (Dutch*), Tongerenas (Lithuanian*), Tongern (German*), Tongres (French*), Tungro (Esperanto*), Tongue (Walloon), Toungern (West Flemish*)
(Slovakia) Topoľčany	Groß-Topoltschan (German*), Nagytapolcsány (Hungarian*), Topolčanai (Lithuanian*), Topoļčani (Latvian*), Topolçanı (Azerbaijani*), Topoľčany (Slovak*), Topolczany (Polish*), Topoljčani (Serbo-Croatian*), Topoljčani – Топољчани (Serbian*), Veľké Topoľčany (archaic Slovak)
(Belgium) Torhout	Thourout (French*), Toeroet (West Flemish*), Toerout (Zeelandic*), Torhautas (Lithuanian), Torhout (Dutch*), Turholt (Latin*)
(Slovakia) Tornaľa	Tornaľa (Slovak*), Tornalja (Hungarian*, Serbo-Croatian*) Tornalja – Торнаља (Serbian*)
(Finland) Tornio	Duortnus (Northern Sami), Toreunio / T'orŭnio - 토르니오 (Korean), Torneå (Swedish), Tornio (Estonian, Finnish)
(Denmark) (Faroe Islands) Tórshavn	Thorshavn (Danish, Finnish, Romanian), Thorshaven (German), Torshamn (Swedish), Tórshavn (Faroese), T'orshavni – ტორსჰავნი (Georgian*), Toreuseuhaun / T'orŭsŭhaun - 토르스하운, Þórshöfn (Icelandic)
(Poland) Toruń	civitas Torunensis or Thorun (Latin), Thorn (German), Torń (Kashubian), Toruň (Czech), Toruń (Polish), Torun (Romanian), Torun' - Торунь (Russian, Ukrainian), Toyern - טױערנ (Yiddish)
(France) Toulon	Toló (Catalan), Tolón (Spanish)*, Tolone (Italian), Toulon (French, Finnish, Romanian) Tulon (Azeri, Polish, old Romanian), Tulona (Latvian)
(France) Toul	Toul (French*, Finnish*, German*, Portuguese*, Romanian*, Swedish*), Tull (old German*)
(France) Toulouse	Tolosa (Italian, Latin, Occitan, old Portuguese, former Spanish, Basque), Tolosa de Llenguadoc (Catalan), Toulouse (French, Finnish, Portuguese, Romanian, Swedish), Touloúzi - Τουλούζη (Greek), Tullujeu / T'ullujŭ - 툴루즈 (Korean), Tuluz (Serbian), Tuluza (Azeri, Polish), T'uluza – ტულუზა (Georgian*), Tulūza (Latvian, Lithuanian), Tuluza - Тулуза (Bulgarian, Ukrainian), Tūrūzu - トゥールーズ (Japanese)*
(Belgium) Tournai	Doarnik (Western Frisian*), Doornik (Dutch*, Zeelandic*), Dôornik (West Flemish*), Dornick (archaic German), Tornè (Walloon*), Tornai (Picard*), Tournai (French*, German*), Tournay (alternative English), Turnacum Nerviorum (Latin*), Turnai (Albanian*) Turne (Azerbaijani*), Turne – Турне (Serbian*), Turnė (Lithuanian*), Turnē (Latvian*), Twrne – Турне (Kazakh*)
(France) Tours	Caesarodunum (Latin), Teurgn (Breton), Tours (French)
(Lithuania) Trakai	Trakai (Lithuanian, Turkish), T'rak'ai – ტრაკაი (Georgian*), Trakaj - Тракай or Troki - Троки (Russian), Trakay (alternative Turkish), Traķi (Latvian), Troki - Трокі (Belarusian), Troki (Polish), Troky (Czech), Troch (Karaim)
(Republic of Ireland) Tralee	Trá Lí (Irish)
(Slovakia) Trebišov	Tőketerebes (Hungarian*), Trebischau (German*), Trebišov (Slovak*), Trebişov (Azerbaijani*), Trebišova (Latvian*), Trebišovas (Lithuanian*)
(Slovakia) Trenčianske Teplice	Trenčianske Teplice (Slovak*), Trencsénteplic (Hungarian*), Trenczyńskie Cieplice (Polish*), Trentschin-Teplitz (German*)
(Slovakia) Trenčín	Laugaricio (Latin), Leukaristos – Λευκάριστος (Ancient Greek), Trenčin (Slovak*), Trenčin – Тренчин (Russian*, Serbian*), Trеnçin (Azerbaijani*), Trenčīna (Latvian*), Trenčynas (Lithuanian*), Trenczyn (Polish*), Trencsén (Hungarian*), Trentschin (German*)
(Italy) Trento	Trent (older English), Trente (Dutch, French), Trento (Italian, Portuguese, Romanian, Spanish, Swedish), Trident (Czech), Tridentum (Latin), Trient (German), Trydent (Polish)
(Germany) Trier	Augusta Treverorum (Latin*),^{[KNAB]} Drir (local German), Tèlǐěr – 特里爾 (Mandarin Chinese*), Teurieo – 트리어 (Korean*), Torīa – トリーア (Japanese*), Treberis (Basque),^{[KNAB]} Tréier (Luxembourgish*),^{[KNAB]} Trevere (Venetian*), Trevèri (Occitan*), Treveris (Basque*), Tréveris (Galician*, Portuguese*, Spanish*,^{[KNAB]}), Trèveris (Catalan*), Treves (dated English),^{[KNAB]} Trèves (French*),^{[KNAB]} Trevír (Czech*,^{[KNAB]} Slovak^{[KNAB]}), Treviri (Italian*),^{[KNAB]} Trevíroi – Τρεβήροι (Greek Katharevousa), Trewir (Polish*),^{[KNAB]} Trier (Danish*, Dutch*, German*, Hungarian*, Swedish*, Turkish*), Triers (dated English), Trir – Трир (Bulgarian*, Russian*,^{[KNAB]} Serbian*), Trir – Трір (Ukrainian*), Trir – Τριρ (Greek*), Trīr ترير (Arabic*), Trīre (Latvian*), Triri (Albanian*), Trîve (Walloon), Tryr – Трыр (Belarusian*), Tryras (Lithuanian*)
(Italy) Trieste	Tergeste (Latin), Terst (Czech, Slovak), Teryésti - Τεργέστη (Greek), Teurieseute / T'ŭriesŭt'e - 트리에스테 (Korean), Toriesute - トリエステ (Japanese)*, Triest - Триест (Bulgarian, Russian), Triest (Catalan, Dutch, Friulian, German, Polish, Romanian variant), Triëst (Dutch), Triest - Трієст (Ukrainian), Trieste (Finnish, Italian, Latvian, Maltese, Portuguese, Romanian, Spanish, Swedish, Turkish), Trieszt (Hungarian), Triyeste (alternative Turkish), Трст (Macedonian), Trst (Croatian, Serbian, Slovene)
(Croatia) Trogir	Traù (Italian), Trogir (Croatian, Romanian, Serbian)
(Slovakia) Trnava	Nagyszombat (Hungarian*), Trnava (Slovak*), Trnava – Трнава (Ukrainian*), Trnawa (Polish*), Tyrnau (German*), Tyrnavia (Latin*)
(Norway) Tromsø	Romsa (Sami),^{[KNAB]} Teuromsoe / T'ŭromsoe - 트롬쇠 (Korean), Tromsë - Тромсё (Russian),^{[KNAB]} Tromsīeg (Anglo-Saxon*), Tromsö (Swedish, Turkish), Tromssa (Finnish)^{[KNAB]}, Trumse (Latvian)
(Norway) Trondheim	Drontheim (archaic German), Nidaros (archaic Norwegian), Niðarós (archaic Icelandic),^{[KNAB]} Niðaróss (Old Norse), Nidrosia (Latin*), Råante (Southern Sami), Roanddin (alternative Northern Sami), Tèlónghèmǔ - 特隆赫姆 (Mandarin Chinese*), Tèlúnhàn - 特倫汗 (alternative Mandarin Chinese), Trånnhjæm (local Norwegian), Troanddin (alternative Northern Sami),^{[KNAB]} Troandin (Northern Sami*),^{[KNAB]} Trondheim (Danish*, Dutch*, German*, Norwegian*, Romanian*, Swedish*, Turkish*), Trondheimas (Lithuanian*), Tróndheimur (Faroese), Trondhjem (archaic Danish, Dano-Norwegian, alternative Norwegian), Tronheima (Latvian*), T'ronheimi – ტრონჰეიმი (Georgian*), Tronxejm - Тронхейм (Russian*), Þrándheimur (Icelandic*)^{[KNAB]}
(Slovakia) Trstená	Árvanádasd (alternative Hungarian), Bingenstadt (German*), Trstená (Slovak*), Trstena (Latvian*), Trstena – Трстена (Serbian*), Trsztena (Hungarian*), Trzciana (Polish*)
(United Kingdom) (England) Truro	Truru (Cornish*)
(Poland) Trzebiatów	Treptow an der Rega (German)
(Germany) Tübingen	Tībingene (Latvian), Tubinga (Catalan, Italian, Portuguese, Spanish), Túbīngēn - 圖賓根 (Chinese), Tübingen (German, Swedish), Tubingue (French), Tubinky or Tybinky (Czech), Tybinga (Polish), Tyvíngi - Τυβίγγη (Greek)
(Belgium) Tubize	Tiubizas (Lithuanian*), Tubeke (Dutch*, Zeelandic*), Tubize (French*), Tweebeek (archaic Dutch)
(Slovakia) Turany	Turany (Slovak*), Nagyturány (Hungarian*)
(Slovakia) Turčianske Teplice	Bad Stuben (German*), Štubnianske Teplice (former Slovak) Stubnyafürdő (Hungarian*), Turčianske Teplice (Slovak*), Turčjanske Tjeplice (Serbo-Croatian*), Turčjanske Tjeplice – Турчјанске Тјеплице (Serbian*)
(Italy) Turin	Augusta Taurinorum (Latin), Taurasia (probably pre-Roman Celtic),Taurinum (medieval Latin), Torí (Catalan), Torino (Croatian, Finnish, Greek, Italian, Norwegian, Romanian, Serbian, Slovene, Turkish), Torinó (Hungarian), Torino - トリノ (Japanese)*, Torino / T'orino - 토리노 (Korean), Touríno - Τουρίνο (Greek), Turien (Limburgish), Turijn (Dutch), Turim (Portuguese), Turin (Piedmontese, Azeri, Basque, French, Friulian, German, Maltese, Occitan, Lombard, Genoese, Swedish), Turín (Czech, Slovak, Spanish), Turīna (Latvian), Turinas (Lithuanian), T'urini - ტურინი (Georgian*), Turyn (Afrikaans, Frisian, Polish)
(France) Turckheim	Turckheim (French)*, Türkheim im Elsass (German, obsolete)*
(Finland) Turku	Abo - Або (archaic Russian) Åbo (Norwegian*, Swedish*^{[KNAB]}), Aboa or Aboia (Latin), Árbæ (alternative Icelandic), Kaby - Кабы (archaic Russian), Toúrkou - Τούρκου (Greek*), Túrcú (Irish*), Turcua (Latin), Tureuku / T'urŭk'u - 투르쿠 (Korean), Turku (Azeri, Finnish, Latvian, Romanian, Sami*, Turkish), T'urk'u – ტურკუ (Georgian*), Turku - Турку (Russian*),^{[KNAB]} Turu (Estonian),^{[KNAB]}
(Belgium) Turnhout	Tiurnhautas (Lithuanian), Turnaut – Турнаут (Serbian*), Turnholtum (Latin*), Turnhout (Dutch*)
(Slovakia) Turzovka	Turzófalva (Hungarian*), Turzovka (Slovak*), Turzówka (Polish*)
(Russia) Tver	Ćvier - Цвер (Цьвер) (Belarusian), Kalinin - Кали́нин (former official name, 1931–1990), Tiveri (Karelian), Tver (Azeri, Italian, Romanian, Slovene, Swedish), Tver - Твер (Ukrainian), Tvera (Latvian), Tverė (Lithuanian), Twer (Polish, German)
(Slovakia) Tvrdošín	Turdoschin (German*), Turdossin (Hungarian*), Tvrdošín (Slovak*), Tvrdošīna (Latvian*), Twardoszyn (Polish*)
(Poland) Tyszowce	Tishevits - טישעװיץ (Yiddish), Tyszowce (Polish)
