= Rajec Marathon =

Annual race in Slovakia since 1984

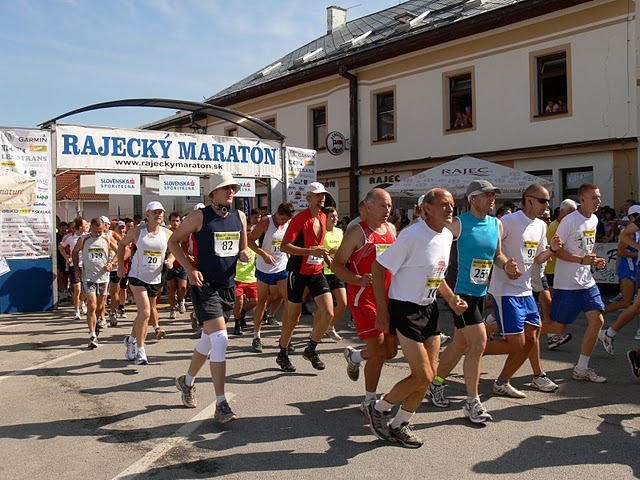
- Race start, 2010
- Date: August
- Location: Rajec, Slovakia
- Event type: Road
- Distance: Marathon
- Established: 1984 (42 years ago)
- Course records: Men's: 2:21:41 (1996) (Ukraine) Sergiy Yanenko; Women's: 2:48:51 (2001) (Slovakia) Anna Balošáková
- Website: Rajec Marathon
- Participants: 1,800 (2025)

The Rajec Marathon (Slovak: Rajecký maratón) is an annual road marathon held in the city of Rajec in Slovakia each August. It was founded in 1984. In the 2000s, the event was expanded to include races at half marathon distance for runners and inline skaters.

== History ==
The Rajec Marathon was first run on 11 August 1984. Starting at Slovak National uprising Square (SNP square; Slovak: Námestie Slovenského národného povstania, shortened: Námestie SNP) in Rajec, the course ran through the village of Fačkov to a turning point in Čičmany, before finishing at the place of the start. The course contained a total elevation gain of 200 metres (660 ft) and of 31 starters, 27 runners completed the course. The marathon was won by Vladimír Balošák in a time of 2 hours, 33 minutes and 40 seconds. Emília Kupčová was the only woman to finish, taking 3 hours, 47 minutes and 40 seconds. In 2000, the race functioned as the veteran national championship, which was won by Pavol Obraz. A race on inline skates was held for the first time in 2005, with its course measuring 21,097 metres (13.109 miles). By 2011, the race had also been expanded to include a half marathon distance, which featured 370 starters that year. In 2017, the half marathon event doubled as the Slovak championship at that distance. The national titles went to Jozef Urban and Sviťanka Soňa Vnenčáková.

== Multiple wins ==
Anna Balošáková won the women's race 12 times between 1985 and 2009. Three men share the record for the most wins, with three each, Slovak Jan Strömpl (1987–1989), Ukrainian Sergiy Yanenko (1995–1997) and Pole Tomasz Chawawko (2002 and 2006–2007).
