= Frivaldszky =

Frivaldszky is a Hungarian surname. Notable persons with the surname include:

- Imre Frivaldszky (1799-1870), Hungarian botanist and entomologist
- Janos Frivaldszky (1822–1895), Hungarian entomologist (mainly coleoptera) and ornithologist (nephew of Imre)
