= Dorcadion triste =

Scientific classification
- Kingdom: Animalia
- Phylum: Arthropoda
- Clade: Pancrustacea
- Class: Insecta
- Order: Coleoptera
- Suborder: Polyphaga
- Infraorder: Cucujiformia
- Family: Cerambycidae
- Genus: Dorcadion
- Species: D. triste

Binomial name
- Dorcadion triste Frivaldszky, 1845

Species of beetle

Dorcadion triste is a species of beetle in the family Cerambycidae. It was described by Imre Frivaldszky in 1845.

== Subspecies ==
- Dorcadion triste phrygicum Peks, 1993
- Dorcadion triste triste Frivaldszky, 1845
