= Dorcadion cervae =

Scientific classification
- Kingdom: Animalia
- Phylum: Arthropoda
- Clade: Pancrustacea
- Class: Insecta
- Order: Coleoptera
- Suborder: Polyphaga
- Infraorder: Cucujiformia
- Family: Cerambycidae
- Genus: Dorcadion
- Species: D. cervae

Binomial name
- Dorcadion cervae Frivaldszky, 1892

Synonyms
- Carinatodorcadion cervae (Frivaldszky) Slama, 2006; Carinatodorcadion fulvum cervae (Frivaldsky) Sama, 2002; Dorcadion fulvum cervae Frivaldszky, 1892; Dorcadion fulvum var. cervae (Frivaldsky) Kraatz, 1894

Species of beetle

Dorcadion cervae is a species of beetle in the family Cerambycidae. It was described by Janos Frivaldszky in 1892. It is known from Hungary and Slovakia, although it is considered to be extinct in the latter region. It reaches a length of 14 to 16 mm (0.55 to 0.63 in).
