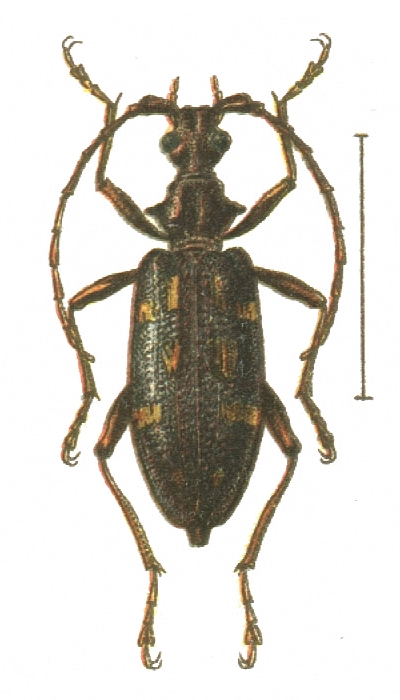
- Xylosteus spinolae

Scientific classification
- Kingdom: Animalia
- Phylum: Arthropoda
- Clade: Pancrustacea
- Class: Insecta
- Order: Coleoptera
- Suborder: Polyphaga
- Infraorder: Cucujiformia
- Family: Cerambycidae
- Subfamily: Lepturinae
- Tribe: Xylosteini
- Genus: Xylosteus; Frivaldszky, 1838

= Xylosteus =

Genus of beetles

Xylosteus is a genus of beetles of the Cerambycidae family, Lepturinae subfamily.

== List of species ==
- Xylosteus bartoni (Mařan & Obenberger, 1933)
- Xylosteus caucasicola (Plavilstshikov, 1936)
- Xylosteus spinolae (Frivaldsky, 1838)
