= Xylosteus caucasicola =

Scientific classification
- Kingdom: Animalia
- Phylum: Arthropoda
- Class: Insecta
- Order: Coleoptera
- Suborder: Polyphaga
- Infraorder: Cucujiformia
- Family: Cerambycidae
- Genus: Xylosteus
- Species: X. caucasicola

Binomial name
- Xylosteus caucasicola (Plavilstshikov, 1936)

Species of beetle

Xylosteus caucasicola is a species of beetle in the family Cerambycidae. It was described by Plavilstshikov in 1936.
