= Rajčanka =

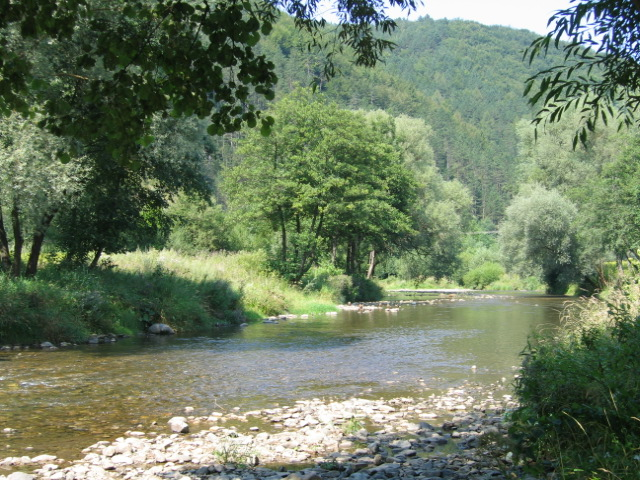
- River near Porúbka

Physical characteristics
- Source
  - location: Strážovské vrchy
- Mouth
  - location: Váh in Žilina
  - coordinates: 49.2352°N 18.7085°E
- Length: 46.6 km (29.0 mi)
- Basin size: 359 km^{2} (139 sq mi)

Basin features
- Progression: Váh→ Danube→ Black Sea

Rajčanka or Rajčianka (Hungarian: Rajcsánka) is a river in northern Slovakia springing in Strážovské vrchy near Čičmany and pouring into Váh in Žilina. It is 46.6 km (29.0 mi) long and its basin size is 359 km^{2} (139 sq mi).

It forms the border of Lúčanská Malá Fatra Mountains and of Strážovské vrchy. 32 km of its length are navigable.

Cities along its course are: Rajec, Rajecké Teplice, Žilina.

== Names and etymology ==
The original name of the river was Lietava, later Žilinka and only after the founding of Rajec (the 14th century) also Rajčanka (see also Etymology of Rajec).
