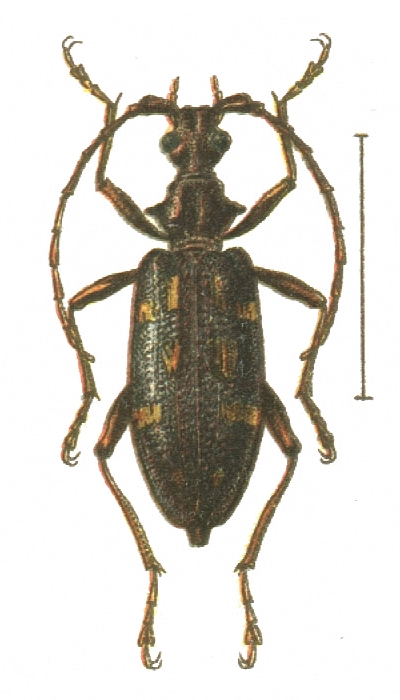

Scientific classification
- Kingdom: Animalia
- Phylum: Arthropoda
- Class: Insecta
- Order: Coleoptera
- Suborder: Polyphaga
- Infraorder: Cucujiformia
- Family: Cerambycidae
- Genus: Xylosteus
- Species: X. spinolae

Binomial name
- Xylosteus spinolae Frivaldsky, 1838

Synonyms
- Rhagium rufiventre Germar, 1845; Xylosteus merkli Pic, 1910; Xylosteus rufiventris (Germar); Xylosteus spinolae rufiventris (Germar) Sama, 1993

= Xylosteus spinolae =

Species of beetle

Xylosteus spinolae is the species of the Lepturinae subfamily in long-horned beetle family. This beetle is distributed in Austria, Bosnia and Herzegovina, Bulgaria, Croatia, Italy, Montenegro, North Macedonia, Romania, Serbia, Slovenia, and Turkey. Adult beetle feeds on flowers of common filbert, and common beech.

== Subspecies ==
There are two subspecies of the species:

- Xylosteus spinolae caucasicola (Plavistshikov, 1936)

Synonym: Xylosteus caucasicola Plavilstshikov, 1936

- Xylosteus spinolae spinolae Frivaldsky, 1838
