= Xylosteus bartoni =

Scientific classification
- Kingdom: Animalia
- Phylum: Arthropoda
- Class: Insecta
- Order: Coleoptera
- Suborder: Polyphaga
- Infraorder: Cucujiformia
- Family: Cerambycidae
- Genus: Xylosteus
- Species: X. bartoni

Binomial name
- Xylosteus bartoni Mařan & Obenberger, 1933

Species of beetle

Xylosteus bartoni is the species of the Lepturinae subfamily in long-horned beetle family. This beetle is distributed in Bulgaria, and North Macedonia.
