= Rajecké Teplice =

- Municipality
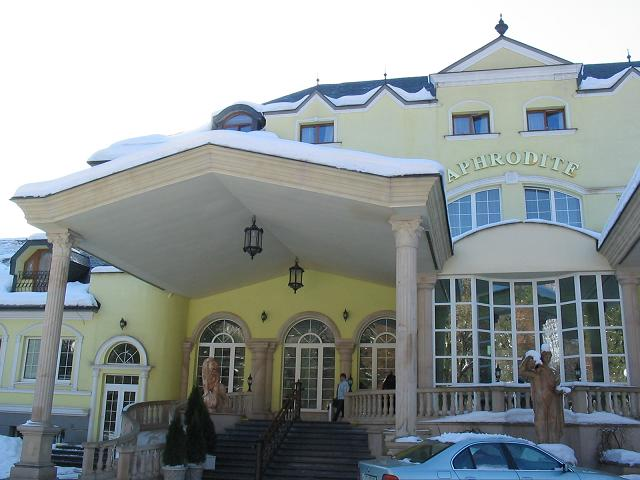
- Aphrodite Spa Hotel in Rajecké Teplice

- Flag Coat of arms

- Location of Rajecké Teplice in the Žilina Region Location of Rajecké Teplice in Slovakia
- Coordinates: 49.13°N 18.68°E
- Country: Slovakia
- Region: Žilina Region
- District: Žilina District
- First mentioned: 1376

Government
  - Mayor: Ambróz Hájnik

Area
  - Total: 11.84 km^{2} (4.57 sq mi)
- Elevation: 411 m (1,348 ft)

Population (2025)
  - Total: 2,843
- Time zone: UTC+1 (CET)
  - Summer (DST): UTC+2 (CEST)
- Postal code: 131 3
- Area code: +421 41
- Vehicle registration plate (until 2022): ZA
- Website: www.rajecke-teplice.info

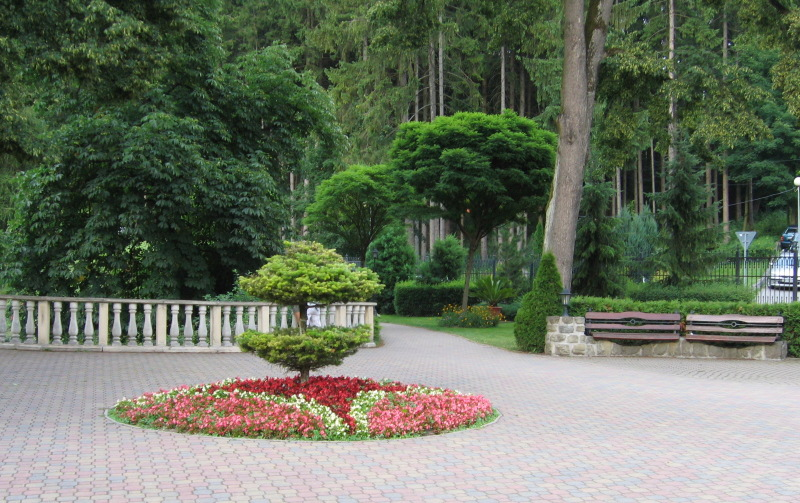
Town park near the spa

Rajecké Teplice (Hungarian: Rajecfürdő) is a spa town in the Žilina District, Žilina Region in northern Slovakia.

== History ==
The first reliable written record was in 1376. It has town status since 1989.

== Geography ==
The municipality lies at an altitude of 411 metres (1,348 ft) and covers an area of 11.84 km^{2} (4.57 sq mi) (2025).

The town lies in the Rajčanka river valley, 15 kilometres (9 miles) south of Žilina.

== Population ==
Population statistic (10 years)
Year	1995	2005	2015	2025
Count	2603	2942	2978	2843
Difference		+13.02%	+1.22%	−4.53%

Population statistic
Year	2024	2025
Count	2833	2843
Difference		+0.35%

It has a population of 2843 people (31 December 2025).

=== Ethnicity ===
Census 2021 (1+ %)
Ethnicity	Number	Fraction
Slovak	2738	96.37%
Not found out	91	3.2%
Total	2841	

In year 2021 was 2841 people by ethnicity 2738 as Slovak, 91 as Not found out, 24 as Czech, 15 as Other, 4 as German, 4 as Hungarian, 3 as Russian, 2 as Ukrainian, 2 as Italian, 2 as Rusyn, 2 as Polish, 2 as French, 2 as Bulgarian, 1 as Chinese, 1 as Romani and 1 as English.

Note on population: The difference values of population numbers in the table "Population statistic" and in the sections "Ethnicity" & "Religion" is caused by the use of various statistical methods.

=== Religion ===
Census 2021 (1+ %)
Religion	Number	Fraction
Roman Catholic Church	2084	73.35%
None	543	19.11%
Not found out	96	3.38%
Evangelical Church	46	1.62%
Total	2841	

In year 2021 was 2841 people by religion 2084 from Roman Catholic Church, 543 from None, 96 from Not found out, 46 from Evangelical Church, 21 from Other and not ascertained christian church, 14 from Christian Congregations in Slovakia, 9 from Ad hoc movements, 6 from Eastern Orthodox Church, 6 from Greek Catholic Church, 5 from Buddhism, 4 from Calvinist Church, 3 from Other, 2 from Jehovah's Witnesses, 1 from Paganism and natural spirituality and 1 from Apostolic Church.

== History of the spa ==
Located between the Lúčanská Malá Fatra and Martinské hole Hills at the valley of the Rajčanka river, the spa is marked as Thermae on a map from 1376, but a deed by Luis the Great gives the first written account of the hot water springs named Villa Tapolcha. In the donation deed made by the king Vladislaus II for Štefan Zápoľský from 1496, the spa is referred to as "possessio Thoplycza", what could mean a settlement or a hamlet.

The Lietava domain had been developed at the beginning of the 17th century and it covered the thermal spa together with the broad surrounding and the first settlements from which the present spa – Rajecké Teplice – had developed. The first buildings included the spa house and an inn for wealthy guests, with the first detailed description of the spa given by professor Cranz in his balneography.

There were three spa pools available for guests and the treatment focused on paralysis, rheumatism, oedema and various dermatological diseases.

The construction of the mansion began in the beginning of the 17th century (1610) and new construction of the spa was commenced at the end of the 18th century, since the Palatine Juraj Thurzo liked this spa, as can be seen from a written document from 1604. The Palatine Thurzo built a brick house with six rooms. The Lietava domain was split after his death, and the spa did not benefit from this and began to deteriorate. The new prime time of the spa came only by the end of the 18th century, when baron Ján Kalis, one of the heirs of the Lietava domain, built a brick house with 14 rooms at significant costs. The spa at those times was divided for gentry, burghers and common people and there were three roofed pools: Noble, Common and Poor.

The first description of the thermal water in Rajecké Teplice comes from 1776 and it was written by Pavol Adami. In 1793, Dr. Amadé Kelin, a physician of the Turčianska County, published in Vienna the first monograph about Rajecké Teplice, promoting the spa town throughout Hungary.

The 19th century saw a comprehensive development of spa facilities, with spas becoming a popular summer residence for gentry, high aristocracy and wealthy bourgeoisie.

The number of visitors decreased rapidly after World War I and Rajecké Teplice became a spa of only a local importance. Numerous constructions of treatment tracts took place in 1925–1937, such as the Spa House, Baník Spa Institute and Veľká Fatra and Malá Fatra Hotels. During the era of the Slovak State, the spa was taken over by the Workers' Social Insurance Company in 1941 that built an open-air swimming pool with thermal water. In 1959, Rajecké Teplice was given a status of a spa town, demarcating the area of the spa and ensuring protection of the healing springs.

In modern times, the biggest boom of the spa can be seen after World War II. Rajecké Teplice was declared to be a city in 1989.

== International relations ==
=== Twin towns – Sister cities ===
Rajecké Teplice is twinned with:

- Dolní Benešov, Czech Republic
- Wilamowice, Poland
- Epe, Netherlands
