= Imre Frivaldszky =

Hungarian botanist and entomologist

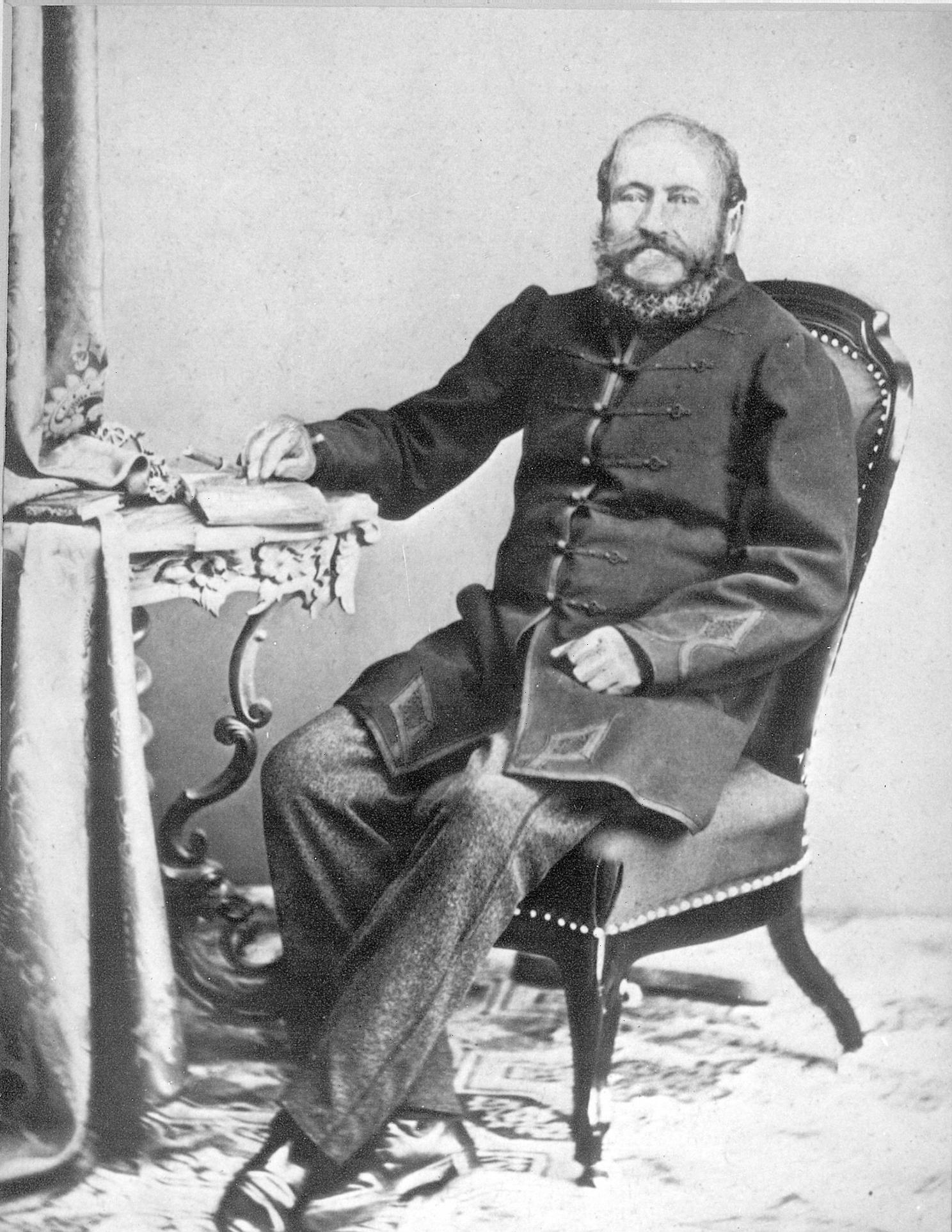
- Born: 6 February 1799; Bacskó, Hungary (now Bačkov, Trebišov District, Slovakia)
- Died: 19 October 1870 (aged 71); Jobbágyi, Hungary
- Other names: Emerich Frivaldszky von Frivald
- Education: Royal Academy of Kassa, University of Budapest
- Known for: Extensive publications on plants, snakes, snails and especially insects
- Relatives: János Frivaldszky (nephew)
- Scientific career
- Fields: Botanist and entomologist
- Institutions: Hungarian National Museum
- Author abbrev. (botany): Friv.
- Author abbrev. (zoology): Frivaldszky

Emerich Frivaldszky von Frivald (6 February 1799 – 19 October 1870), known as Imre Frivaldszky, was a Hungarian botanist and entomologist.

== Biography ==
Born into a family of landed gentry, Frivaldszky studied at the gymnasiums in Sátoraljaújhely and Eger, then philosophy at the Royal Academy of Kassa. He graduated in medicine from the University of Budapest in 1823.

While still a student in Eger he accompanied Pál Kitaibel and Jószef Sadler on botanical excursions. By the time he graduated in medicine he was already assistant curator at the Hungarian National Museum in Budapest in 1822, where he later served as curator until his retirement in 1851. In 1824 he abandoned the practice of medicine and spent the rest of his life as a botanist and zoologist. He made many collecting trips throughout Hungary, Ottoman Empire and Italy. Frivaldszky issued and distributed the exsiccata-like series Species plantarum exsiccatarum europaea-turcicarum.

Frivaldszky wrote extensively on plants, snakes, snails and especially insects (Lepidoptera and Coleoptera). A large part of his huge entomological collection was destroyed in a flood in 1838, the rest in 1956 during the anticommunist revolution. Many of his specimens are in the Natural History Museum of the University of Pisa. His nephew János Frivaldszky also became an entomologist and curator at the Hungarian National Museum.

== Notes ==
- This article includes material from the Slovak and Hungarian Wikipedia.
