= Fačkov =

Village and municipality in Slovakia

- Municipality
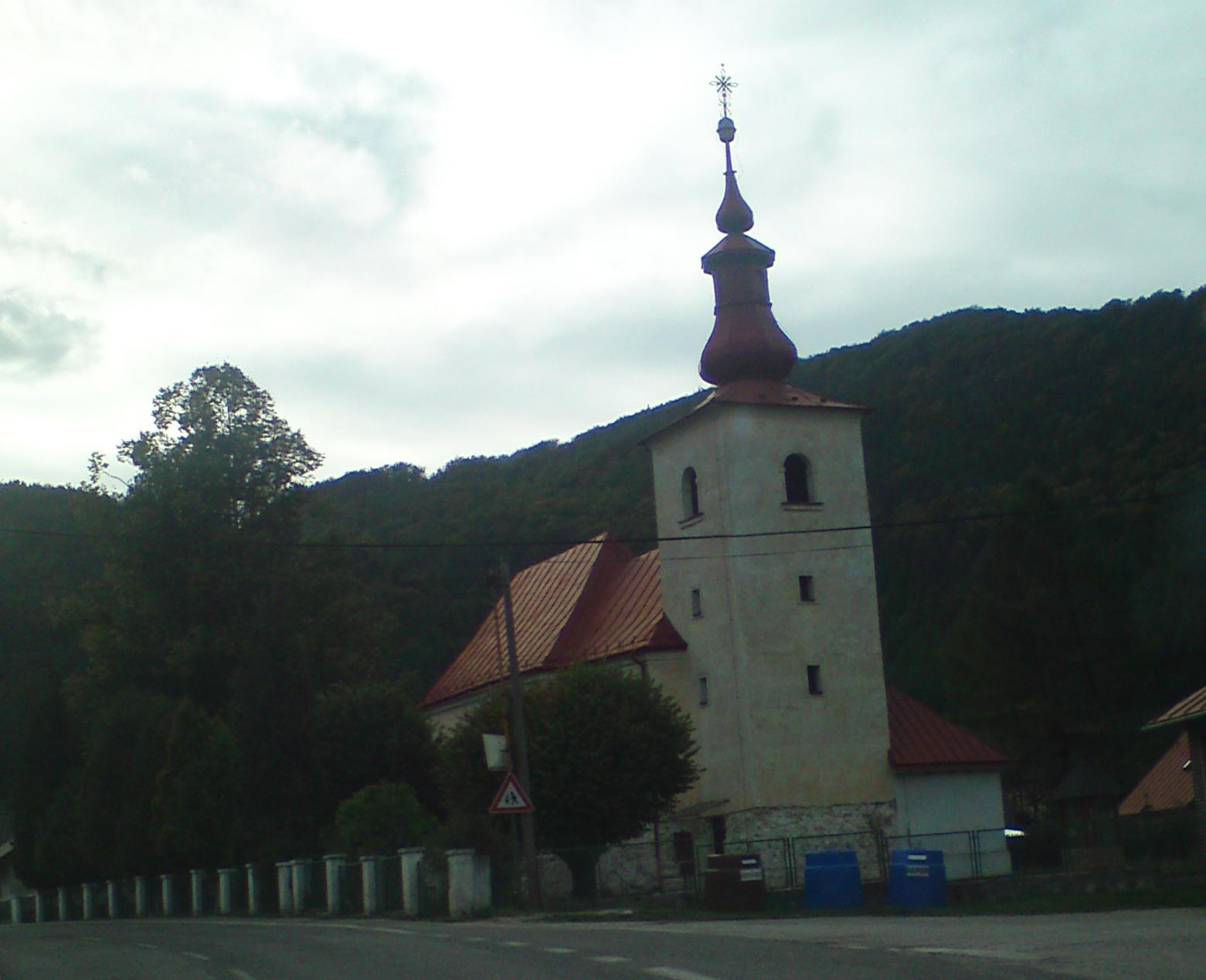

- Flag

- Location of Fačkov in the Žilina Region Location of Fačkov in Slovakia
- Coordinates: 49.02°N 18.60°E
- Country: Slovakia
- Region: Žilina Region
- District: Žilina District
- First mentioned: 1351

Area
  - Total: 37.51 km^{2} (14.48 sq mi)
- Elevation: 534 m (1,752 ft)

Population (2025)
  - Total: 654
- Time zone: UTC+1 (CET)
  - Summer (DST): UTC+2 (CEST)
- Postal code: 131 6
- Area code: +421 41
- Vehicle registration plate (until 2022): ZA
- Website: www.obecfackov.sk

Fačkov (Hungarian: Facskó) is a village and municipality in Žilina District in the Žilina Region of northern Slovakia.

== History ==
The first written mention is from 1351, it is mentioned as Luchka - "a settlement on a meadow in the forest". The name of the village is derived from the name of the first hereditary mayor, who was called Fachkó. The village belonged to the Považ manor, a small part of the farm was owned by zemans. In the village there is a Baroque Church of St. Nicholas built in 1761, which has already undergone several reconstructions.

The name of the village changed over the centuries: in 1471 it was mentioned as Fachkwa Lhota, in 1508 as Faczkow and in 1773 as Fačkov. While in 1598 there were 35 houses in the village, in 1784 there were already 126 houses, in which 158 families and 1045 inhabitants lived. In the 1828 census, Fačkov had 123 houses and 1,374 inhabitants, making it one of the larger settlements. In the mountainous region, the inhabitants were engaged in cattle breeding and alcohol burning, after the establishment of the First Republic, agriculture and forestry expanded. During the uprising, the Revolutionary National Committee was active here, and partisans were active in the wider area.

== Geography ==
The municipality lies at an altitude of 534 metres (1,752 ft) and covers an area of 37.51 km^{2} (14.48 sq mi) (2025).

== Population ==
Population statistic (10 years)
Year	1995	2005	2015	2025
Count	793	724	644	654
Difference		−8.70%	−11.04%	+1.55%

Population statistic
Year	2024	2025
Count	666	654
Difference		−1.80%

It has a population of 654 people (31 December 2025).

=== Ethnicity ===
Census 2021 (1+ %)
Ethnicity	Number	Fraction
Slovak	645	98.77%
Czech	8	1.22%
Total	653	

In year 2021 was 653 people by ethnicity 645 as Slovak, 8 as Czech, 5 as Not found out, 3 as Russian and 2 as Other.

Note on population: The difference values of population numbers in the table "Population statistic" and in the sections "Ethnicity" & "Religion" is caused by the use of various statistical methods.

=== Religion ===
Census 2021 (1+ %)
Religion	Number	Fraction
Roman Catholic Church	609	93.26%
None	31	4.75%
Total	653	

In year 2021 was 653 people by religion 609 from Roman Catholic Church, 31 from None, 6 from Evangelical Church, 2 from Not found out, 2 from Other, 1 from Christian Congregations in Slovakia, 1 from Hinduism and 1 from Ad hoc movements.

== Genealogical resources ==
The records for genealogical research are available at the state archive "Statny Archiv in Bytca, Slovakia"

- Roman Catholic church records (births/marriages/deaths): 1788-1934 (parish A)

== See also ==
- List of municipalities and towns in Slovakia
