= Rajec =

- Municipality
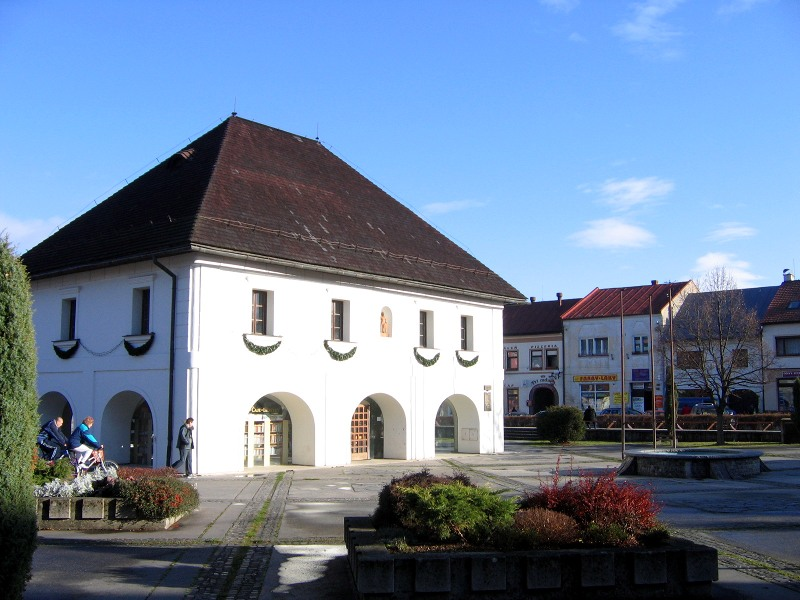
- SNP Square, Rajec

- Flag Coat of arms

- Location of Rajec in the Žilina Region Location of Rajec in Slovakia
- Coordinates: 49.09°N 18.63°E
- Country: Slovakia
- Region: Žilina Region
- District: Žilina District
- First mentioned: 1193

Government
  - Mayor: Milan Hanus

Area
  - Total: 33.98 km^{2} (13.12 sq mi)
- Elevation: 448 m (1,470 ft)

Population (2025)
  - Total: 5,641
- Time zone: UTC+1 (CET)
  - Summer (DST): UTC+2 (CEST)
- Postal code: 150 1
- Area code: +421 41
- Vehicle registration plate (until 2022): ZA
- Website: www.rajec.sk

Rajec (Hungarian: Rajec; German: Rajetz) is a town in the Žilina District, Žilina Region in northern Slovakia.

== Etymology ==
Rajec, Rajčianka, Rajčanka are derived from Proto-Slavic appellative *rajь – a wet, muddy place (modern Slovak raj – a paradise, "a place with rich vegetation").

== History ==
The first written record about Rajec was in 1193, as Raich, in a document issued by King Béla III. The first mention of the town comes from 1397.

== Notable people ==
- János Frivaldszky (1822–1895), entomologist and ornithologist

== Geography ==
The municipality lies at an altitude of 448 metres (1,470 ft) and covers an area of 33.98 km^{2} (13.12 sq mi) (2025). It is situated between Strážovské vrchy, and Malá Fatra mountains, in the Rajčanka river valley, around 20 km (12 mi) south-south-west of Žilina.

== Population ==
Population statistic (10 years)
Year	1995	2005	2015	2025
Count	6428	6078	5850	5641
Difference		−5.44%	−3.75%	−3.57%

Population statistic
Year	2024	2025
Count	5703	5641
Difference		−1.08%

It has a population of 5641 people (31 December 2025).

=== Ethnicity ===
Census 2021 (1+ %)
Ethnicity	Number	Fraction
Slovak	5567	94.4%
Not found out	305	5.17%
Total	5897	

In year 2021 was 5897 people by ethnicity 5567 as Slovak, 305 as Not found out, 37 as Czech, 17 as Other, 15 as Romani, 7 as Moravian, 7 as Hungarian, 4 as Chinese, 3 as Italian, 3 as Polish, 3 as German, 3 as Croatian, 1 as Jewish, 1 as Vietnamese, 1 as Ukrainian, 1 as Greek and 1 as English.

Note on population: The difference values of population numbers in the table "Population statistic" and in the sections "Ethnicity" & "Religion" is caused by the use of various statistical methods.

=== Religion ===
Census 2021 (1+ %)
Religion	Number	Fraction
Roman Catholic Church	4712	79.91%
None	602	10.21%
Not found out	369	6.26%
Evangelical Church	108	1.83%
Total	5897	

In year 2021 was 5897 people by religion 4712 from Roman Catholic Church, 602 from None, 369 from Not found out, 108 from Evangelical Church, 30 from Ad hoc movements, 18 from Greek Catholic Church, 15 from Other, 7 from Christian Congregations in Slovakia, 6 from Other and not ascertained christian church, 5 from Calvinist Church, 5 from Jehovah's Witnesses, 5 from Buddhism, 4 from Paganism and natural spirituality, 4 from Islam, 2 from Seventh-day Adventist Church, 1 from Old Catholic Church, 1 from Eastern Orthodox Church, 1 from Czechoslovak Hussite Church, 1 from Bahá'i Community and 1 from Apostolic Church.

According to the 2001 census, the town had 6,074 inhabitants. 98.86% of inhabitants were Slovaks and 0.68% were Czechs. The religious make-up was 92.79% Roman Catholics, 3.42% people with no religious affiliation, and 1.89% Lutherans.

== Sightseeings ==
- Town Hall, a Renaissance one-floor building available from all sides. Open arcades served as a market. On the second floor, there were administrative rooms of the town council. After the newest reconstruction in 1992, the arcades are full glassed and the town hall serve as wedding, concert and exhibition room. (3D Model)
- Town museum, former brewery residence

== Culture ==
The Rajec Marathon, an annual road race, was established in the town in 1984.

== Twin towns — sister cities ==
Rajec is twinned with:

- Czechowice-Dziedzice, Poland
- Kęty, Poland
- Krnov, Czech Republic
- Rýmařov, Czech Republic
