= Janos Frivaldszky =

Hungarian entomologist and ornithologist (1822–1895)

- Frivaldszky János
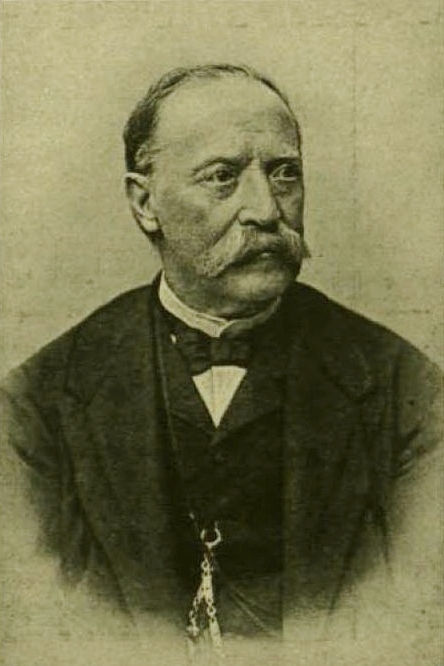
- Born: 17 June 1822; Rajec, Trencsén County, Hungary
- Died: 29 March 1895 (aged 72); Budapest
- Education: Budapest University of Technology and Economics
- Known for: Aves Hungariae (Magyarország madarai) (1891)
- Relatives: Imre Frivaldszky (uncle)
- Scientific career
- Fields: Entomology, ornithology
- Workplaces: Hungarian Natural History Museum

János Frivaldszky (17 June 1822 – 29 March 1895) was a Hungarian entomologist and ornithologist. Nephew of Imre Frivaldszky, he succeeded him at the Hungarian Natural History Museum. He sometimes used the German form Johannes or Latin form Joannes in his writings.

Frivaldszky was born in Rajec, Trencsén County, Kingdom of Hungary and introduced to natural history by his uncle Imre Frivaldszky. After studying engineering at the University of Technology he decided to study zoology. He collected specimens and brought them to his uncle and from 1850, he often acted as a substitute for his uncle. Frivaldszky took a special interest in insects and along with his uncle they travelled and collected across the region. They took a special interest in cave fauna and examined the Bihar mountains of western Transylvania. became assistant director of the Hungarian National Museum after the retirement of his uncle. He was especially interested in cave arthropods and beetles. In later life he studied the birds of Hungary and wrote Aves Hungariae (Magyarország madarai) (1891). He examined the insect collections made by Count Béla Széchenyi (1837–1918).
