= Čičmany =

- Municipality
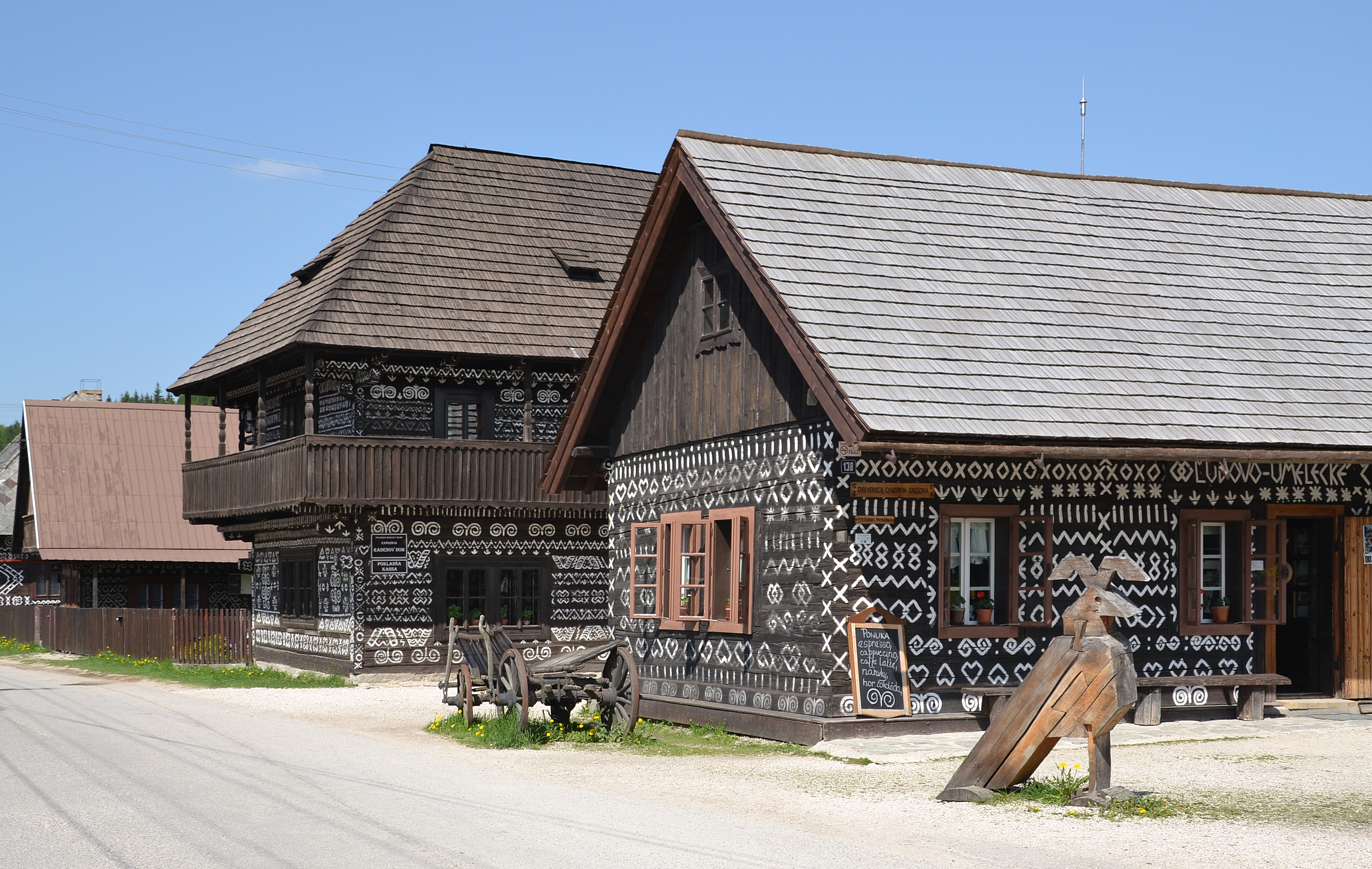
- Folk architecture in Čičmany

- Flag Coat of arms

- Location of Čičmany in the Žilina Region Location of Čičmany in Slovakia
- Coordinates: 48°57′18″N 18°30′58″E
- Country: Slovakia
- Region: Žilina Region
- District: Žilina District
- First mentioned: 1272

Area
  - Total: 25.61 km^{2} (9.89 sq mi)
- Elevation: 645 m (2,116 ft)

Population (2025)
  - Total: 125
- Time zone: UTC+1 (CET)
  - Summer (DST): UTC+2 (CEST)
- Postal code: 131 7
- Area code: +421 41
- Vehicle registration plate (until 2022): ZA
- Website: www.obeccicmany.sk

Čičmany is a village and municipality in Žilina District in the Žilina Region of northern Slovakia. It contains a folk architecture reserve, which was founded in 1977.

== Etymology ==
The name is derived from a Slovak word čičman (a lumberjack who makes a noise while working).

== History ==
The first preserved reference to the village dates from 1272 (Cziczman). After a great fire in 1921, the village was restored to its original appearance with generous contributions by the state. Until the mid-20th century, the village was a centre of sheep raising.

== Geography ==
The municipality lies at an altitude of 645 metres (2,116 ft) and covers an area of 25.61 km^{2} (9.89 sq mi) (2025).

== Population ==
Population statistic (10 years)
| Year | 1995 | 2005 | 2015 | 2025 |
|---|---|---|---|---|
| Count | 274 | 207 | 142 | 125 |
| Difference | | −24.45% | −31.40% | −11.97% |

Population statistic
| Year | 2024 | 2025 |
|---|---|---|
| Count | 124 | 125 |
| Difference | | +0.80% |

It has a population of 125 people (31 December 2025).

=== Ethnicity ===
Census 2021 (1+ %)
| Ethnicity | Number | Fraction |
|---|---|---|
| Slovak | 119 | 100% |
| Total | 119 | |

In year 2021 was 119 people by ethnicity 119 as Slovak, 1 as Czech, 1 as Russian and 1 as German.

Note on population: The difference values of population numbers in the table "Population statistic" and in the sections "Ethnicity" & "Religion" is caused by the use of various statistical methods.

=== Religion ===
Census 2021 (1+ %)
| Religion | Number | Fraction |
|---|---|---|
| Roman Catholic Church | 106 | 89.08% |
| None | 13 | 10.92% |
| Total | 119 | |

In year 2021 was 119 people by religion 106 from Roman Catholic Church and 13 from None.

== Culture ==
Timbered houses with ridge roofs, galleries and pointed or linear wall decorations have been preserved in Čičmany. Of particular interest are the very specific white patterns which are painted on the exterior walls of the houses to decorate them. The local folk music, special folk costumes and folk dances of the village have been preserved as well.

== Genealogical resources ==
The records for genealogical research are available at the state archive "Statny Archiv in Bytca, Slovakia"

- Roman Catholic church records (births/marriages/deaths): 1729–1918 (parish A)

== See also ==
- List of municipalities and towns in Slovakia
