= Divina =

Divina may refer to:

- Divina, Žilina District, village and municipality in northern Slovakia

== Fauna ==
- Argyropeza divina, a species of sea snail
- Calidota divina, a moth of the family Erebidae
- Nemophora divina, a moth of the Adelidae family
- Stigmella divina, a moth of the family Nepticulidae

== Other ==
- Divina (name)
- Divina (typeface)
- La Divina, a nickname for Marie Callas (1923–1977), Greek operatic soprano
- Divina, the soundtrack to Divina, está en tu corazón, a Spanish-language telenovela
- Divina proportione, a book on mathematics written by Luca Pacioli and illustrated by Leonardo da Vinci (1509)
- MSC Divina, a 2011 cruise ship

== See also ==
- Divine (disambiguation)
- Divina Pastora (disambiguation)
- Debina Bonnerjee (born 1983), Indian actress
