= Divine (disambiguation) =

Divine is an adjective related to divinity, the characteristics of a deity.

Divine or Divines may also refer to:

== Businesses ==
- Divine (corporation), a defunct web services company
- Divine Chocolate, a British-Ghanaian chocolate brand

== Films ==
- Divine (1935 film), a French drama film
- Divine (1975 film), a French comedy film
- Divine (2020 film), a German-Italian romantic comedy film
- Divine, a Japanese science fantasy coming age film starring Akane Sakanoue
- Divines (film), a 2016 French film

== Literature ==
- The Divine (graphic novel), a 2015 graphic novel by Asaf Hanuka, Tomer Hanuka, and Boaz Lavie
- Divine, a character in Jean Genet's novel Our Lady of the Flowers

== Music ==
=== Performers ===
- Divine (rapper) (born 1990), Indian rapper
- Divine (group), an American R&B girl group formed in 1996
- Divine Brown (singer) (born 1974), Canadian R&B and soul singer
- Divine Styler, stage name of American hip hop artist Mikal Safiyullah (born Mark Richardson in 1968)

=== Albums ===
- Divine (Tuxedomoon album) (1982)
- Divine (Blinded Colony album) (2003)

=== Songs ===
- "Divine" (Korn song) (1994)
- "Divine" (t.A.T.u. song) (2005)
- "Divine" (Sébastien Tellier song) (2008)
- "Divine" (Girls' Generation song) (2014)
- "Divine", by Shea Couleé from the 2023 album 8
- "Divine" (Stray Kids song), 2025

== People ==
- Divine (surname), a surname
- Divine (given name), a list of people with the name
- Divine (performer) (1945–1988), American actor, singer, and drag queen; stage name of Harris Glenn Milstead
- La Divine (English: "The Goddess"), nickname for Suzanne Lenglen (1899–1938), French tennis player
- Father Divine (c. 1876–1965), African-American spiritual leader who claimed to be God
- Estella Marie Thompson (born 1969), aka Divine Brown, prostitute involved in a scandal involving actor Hugh Grant
- Zuzu Divine (born 1994), Mexican professional wrestler
- Anglican divine, a theologian of the Church of England

== Other uses ==
- Divine (service), a short-form video app
- Obsolete term for a Christian priest

== See also ==
- Divina (disambiguation)
- Devine (disambiguation)
- Divination
- Divining rod
