= List of people from Orlando, Florida =

This is a list of notable people including natives and residents of Orlando, Florida.

== A ==
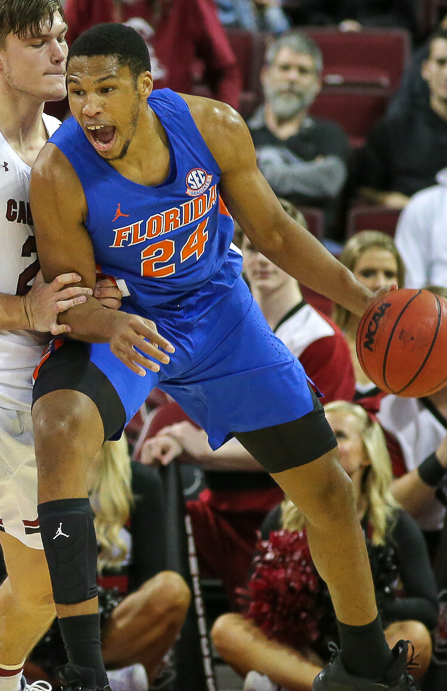
Kerry Blackshear Jr.

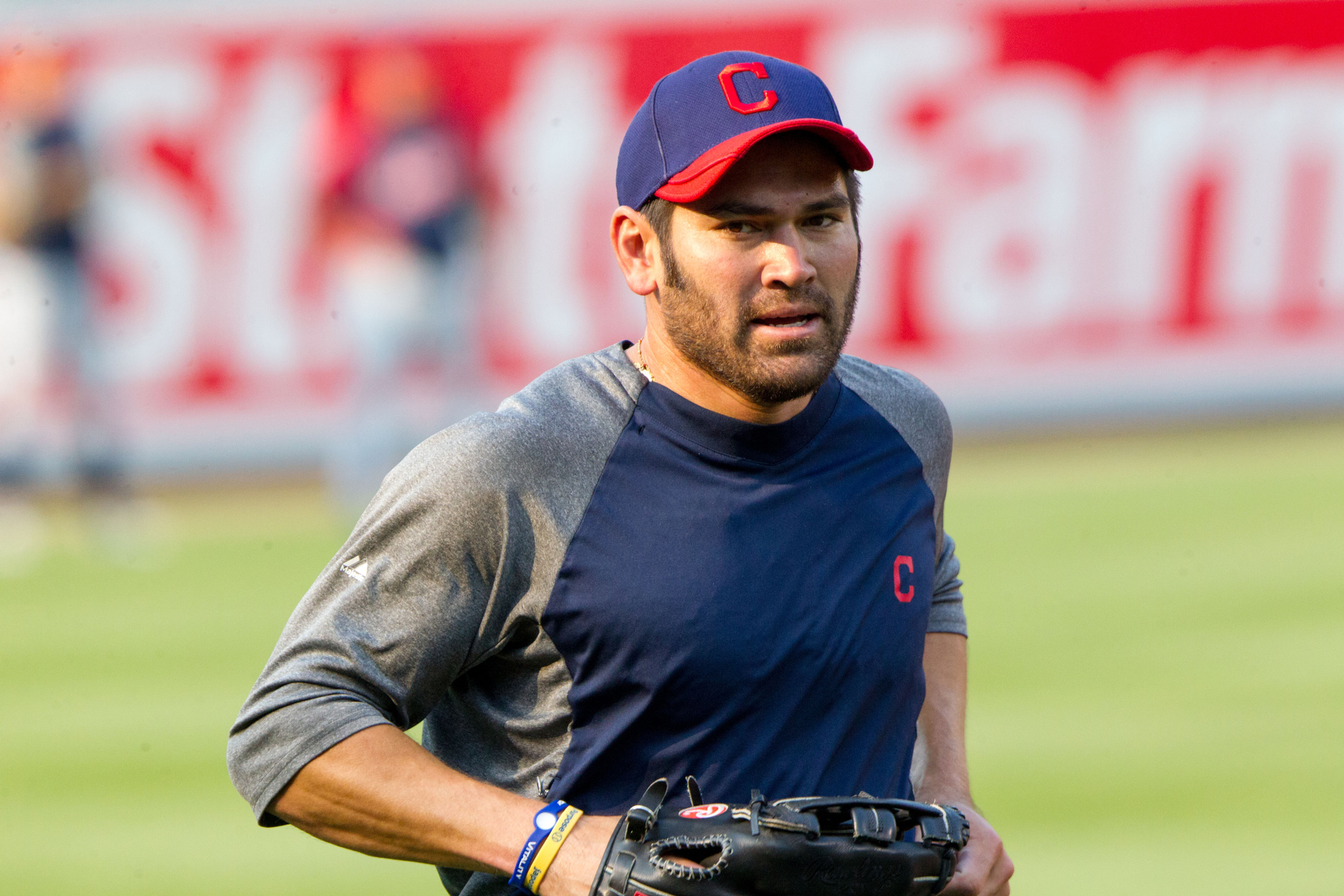
Johnny Damon

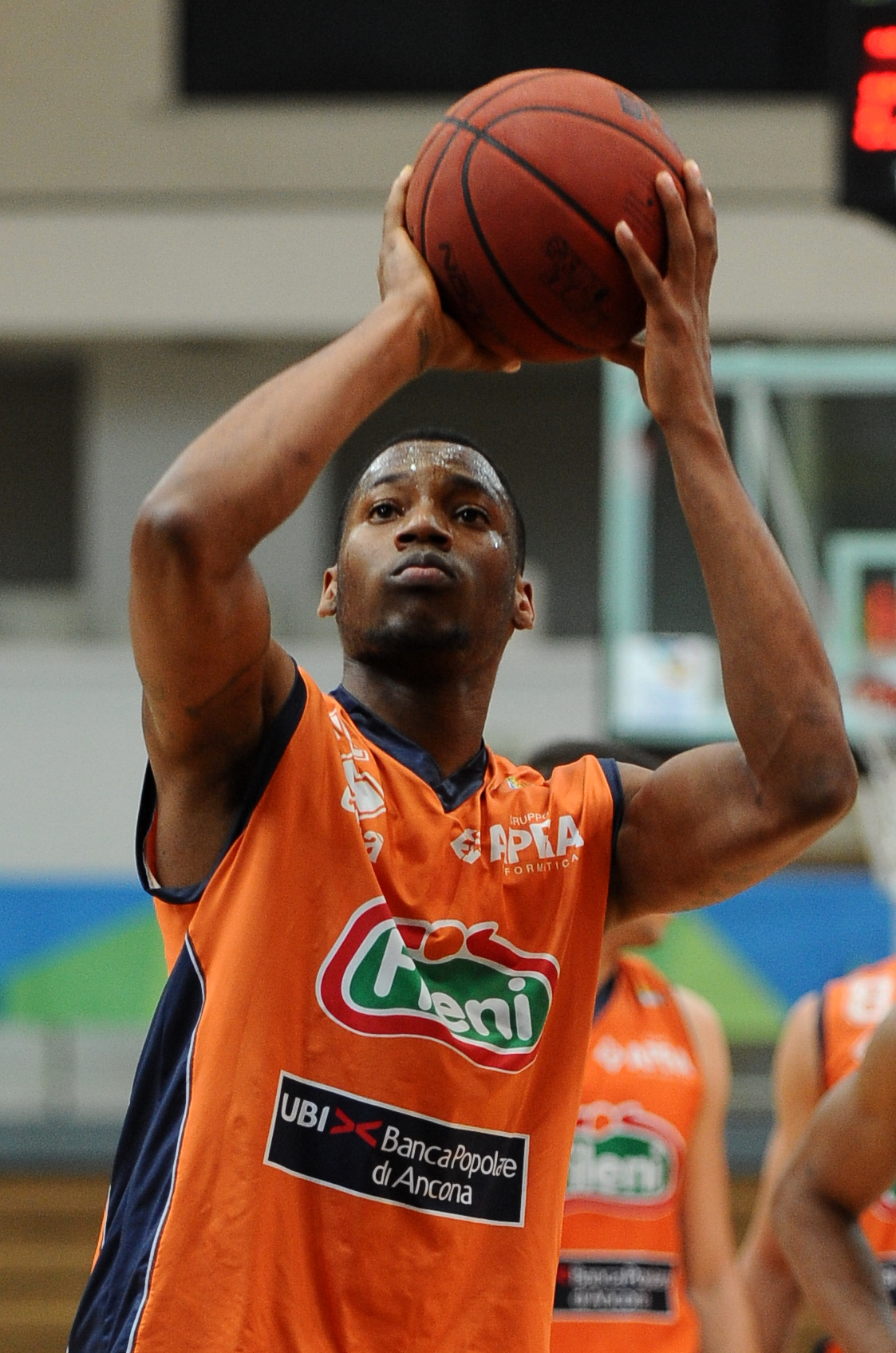
Eric Griffin

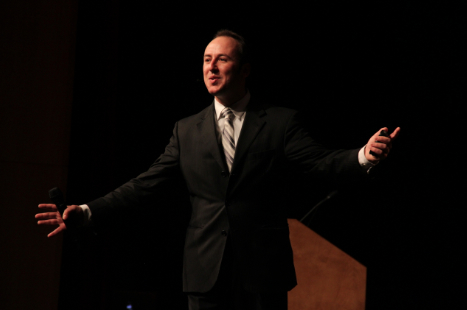
Kostya Kimlat

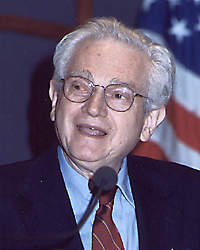
Marshall Warren Nirenberg

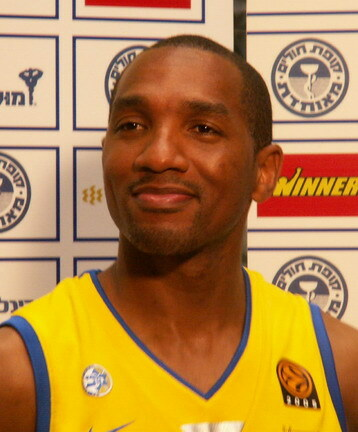
Derrick Sharp

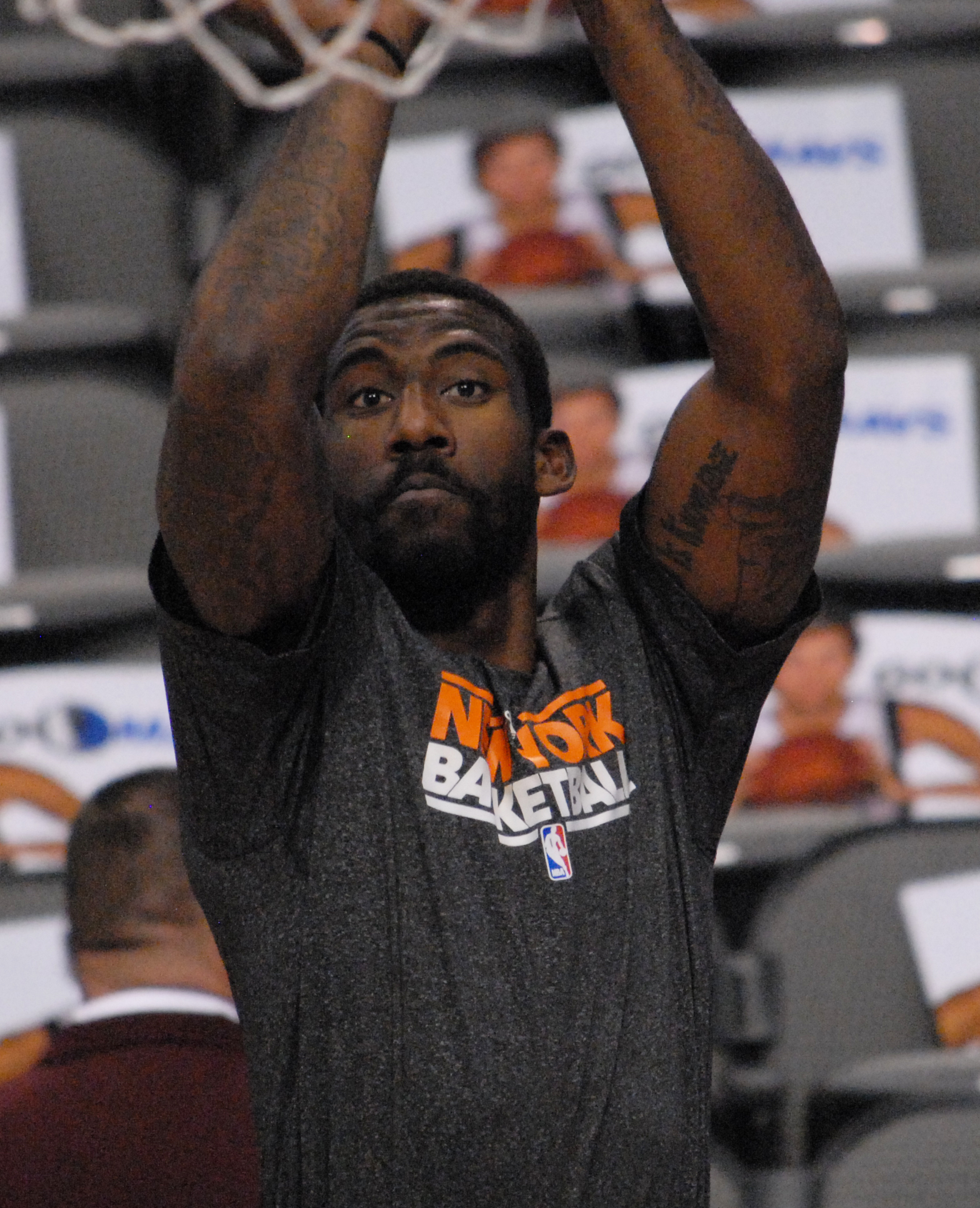
Amar'e Stoudemire

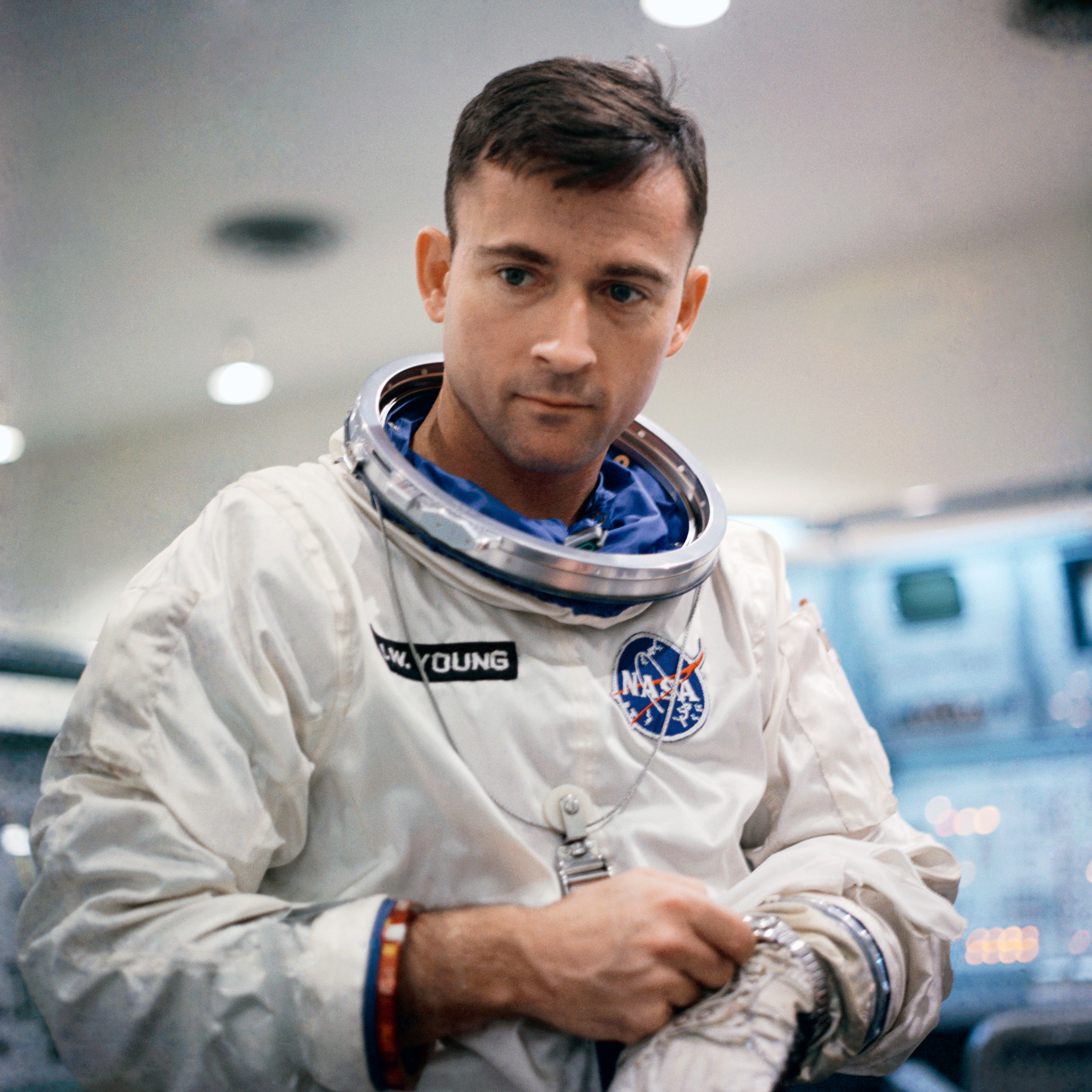
John Young

- AK1200, musician, record producer
- Cody Allen (born 1988), Major League Baseball pitcher
- Kirsten Bloom Allen, actress and dancer with the Orlando Ballet
- Maurice Allen (born 1981), professional golfer
- Robb Alvey, roller coaster reviewer and video game producer
- Kiradech Aphibarnrat (born 1989), professional golfer
- Cristian Arrieta (born 1979), soccer player and coach
- Chucky Atkins (born 1974), National Basketball Association player
- Ayo the Producer (born 1988), Grammy Award-winning producer

== B ==
- Lance Bass (born 1979), singer, member of boy band 'N Sync
- Billy Beane (born 1962), MLB player and executive
- Giselle Bellas, singer-songwriter (originally from Miami, Florida)
- Bo Bichette (born 1998), MLB player
- Kerry Blackshear Jr. (born 1997), basketball player in the Israeli Basketball Premier League
- Kerlin Blaise (born 1974), NFL player
- Antonio Blakeney (born 1996), basketball shooting guard in the Israeli Basketball Premier League; former NBA player
- Alexa Bliss (born 1991), professional wrestler (originally from Columbus, Ohio)
- Lynda Lyon Block (1948–2002), convicted murderer known as the first woman executed in Alabama
- Stephanie Borowicz (c. 1977), Pennsylvania state representative
- Wayne Brady (born 1972), actor, singer, comedian, and television personality
- Andrew Brody (born 1995), soccer player
- Chaundee Brown (born 1998), NBA player for the Atlanta Hawks
- Jenn Brown (born 1981), sportscaster (originally from Gainesville, Florida)
- Delta Burke (born 1956), actress, producer, author

== C ==
- Michael Campion (born 2002), actor best known for Fuller House
- Asa B. Carey (1835–1912), U.S. Army brigadier general
- Caskey (born 1992), rapper
- Raymond Cassagnol (1920–2023), Haitian-born member of the Tuskegee Airmen
- Talia Castellano (1999–2013), internet celebrity and model who was best known for her work on YouTube, became the first honorary CoverGirl in 2012
- Joe Chealey, basketball player in the Israeli Basketball Premier League
- Brian Patrick Clarke (born 1952), film actor
- Ha Ha Clinton-Dix (born 1992), professional football player
- Choo-Choo Coleman (1937–2016), MLB catcher who played for the Philadelphia Phillies and New York Mets
- Alexa Collins (born 1995), influencer
- Cal Conley (born 1999), shortstop in the Atlanta Braves organization
- Manny Coto, writer and director

== D ==
- Johnny Damon (born 1973), MLB outfielder
- Marquis Daniels (born 1981), professional basketball player
- Sarah E. Daniels (born 1989), actress (originally from Tallahassee, Florida)
- Teahna Daniels (born 1997), Olympic athlete, sprinter
- Darryl Dawkins (1957–2015), professional basketball player
- Juan Debiedma (born 1993), professional Super Smash Bros. Melee player
- Paul DeJong (born 1993), MLB infielder
- Detox Icunt (born 1985), drag queen; best known for competing on the fifth season of RuPaul's Drag Race and being a runner-up on the second season of RuPaul's Drag Race All Stars
- Neil Divine (1939–1994), stellar and planetary astrophysicist
- DJ Magic Mike (born 1964), Miami bass artist
- Howie Dorough (born 1973), member of Backstreet Boys
- Nate Douglas (born 2000), politician and educator
- Dream (born 1999), Minecraft YouTuber
- Ericka Dunlap (born 1981), Miss America 2004
- Buddy Dyer (born 1958), mayor of Orlando

== E ==
- Buddy Ebsen (1908–2003), actor
- David Efianayi (born 1995), basketball player in the Israeli Basketball Premier League
- Charles McArther Emmanuel (born 1978), son of Liberian leader Charles Taylor

== F ==
- Joey Fatone (born 1977), singer, member of boy band 'N Sync
- Aaron Fechter (born 1953), mechanical engineer and entrepreneur, creator of The Rock-afire Explosion, co-founder of ShowBiz Pizza Place
- Luis Fonsi (born 1978), singer
- Josh Freese (born 1972), drummer for Nine Inch Nails, Guns N' Roses, Foo Fighters, The Vandals, Devo, A Perfect Circle, and more
- Maxwell Frost (born 1997), Democratic member of the U.S. House of Representatives

== G ==
- Genitorturers, industrial metal band
- GlokkNine (born 2000), rapper
- Drew Gooden (born 1993), YouTuber
- Zack Greinke (born 1983), MLB pitcher
- Eric Griffin (born 1990), basketball player for Hapoel Yossi Avrahami Eilat of the Israeli Basketball Premier League
- Vaughn Grissom (born 2001), MLB player for the Atlanta Braves

== H ==
- Ashlyn Harris (born 1985), professional soccer player, two times World Cup Champion (originally from Satellite Beach, Florida)
- Stumpy Harris (1938–2021), eminent domain lawyer and major donor and supporter of the Florida Gators
- Michael Halliday (born 2003), professional soccer player
- Adam Haseley (born 1996), professional baseball player
- Sally Hogshead, author and professional speaker
- Glenda Hood (born 1950), mayor of Orlando, 1993–2003 (originally from Kissimmee, Florida)
- Rod Houison, musician, producer, sound engineer
- Jack Hughes (born 2001), professional hockey player
- Quinn Hughes (born 1999), professional hockey player
- Will Hunt (born 1971), Evanescence drummer
- Zora Neale Hurston (1891–1960), author, anthropologist, filmmaker

== I ==
- Augustus Invictus (born 1983), far-right political activist, attorney, blogger, white nationalist

== J ==
- Chris Johnson (born 1985), former NFL running back
- Chris Johnson (born 1990), basketball player in the Israeli Basketball Premier League
- Davey Johnson (born 1943), MLB player, manager
- Karl Joseph (born 1993), professional football player
- Kerby Joseph (born 2000), NFL player for the Detroit Lions

== K ==
- Brian Kendrick (born 1979), professional wrestler
- Jack Kerouac (1922–1969), author, poet and painter (originally from Lowell, Massachusetts)
- Chad Kessler (born 1975), football player
- Paul John Knowles (1946–1974), serial killer, rapist
- Lydia Ko (born 1997), professional golfer
- Ali Krieger (born 1984), professional soccer player, two-time World Cup Champion

== L ==
- Tao Lin (born 1983), novelist and poet
- Michael Lockley (born 1988), professional football player
- Audrey Long (1922–2014), stage and screen actress of the 1940s and 1950s
- Erickson Lubin (born 1995), professional boxer

== M ==
- Stacey Mack (born 1975), former NFL running back, played for Jacksonville Jaguars and Houston Texans
- Mike Maroth (born 1977), former MLB pitcher, currently the pitching coach for the Gwinnett Stripers
- Tony McCoy (born 1969), professional football player
- Charlotte McKinney (born 1993), model, actress
- AJ McLean (born 1978), member of the Backstreet Boys
- Benji Michel (born 1997), professional soccer player
- Brad Miller (born 1989), Philadelphia Phillies infielder
- Mandy Moore (born 1984), actress (originally from Nashua, New Hampshire)
- Jan Mulder, pianist, composer, conductor
- Emma Myers (born 2002), actress

== N ==
- Naomi (born 1987), wrestler (originally from Sanford, Florida)
- Kathryn Newton (born 1997), actress
- Nate Newton (born 1961), professional football player
- Tim Newton (born 1963), professional football player
- Marshall Warren Nirenberg (1927–2010), Nobel Prize-winning biochemist, geneticist

== O ==
- Kenny Omega (born 1983), professional wrestler
- Sean O'Neal (born 1975), actor
- Rob Oppenheim (born 1980), professional golfer

== P ==
- Robert Pierre (born 1992), Christian singer/songwriter
- A. J. Pierzynski (born 1976), MLB catcher
- Rene Plasencia (born 1973), Republican member of the Florida House of Representatives
- Eric Powell (born 1985), racing driver

== R ==
- Raptile (or Addis), (born 1976), singer, songwriter, and rapper
- Dot Richardson (born 1961), physician, softball Olympic gold medalist, USA Softball Hall of Fame honoree
- Jean Rodríguez (born 1980), singer, songwriter, producer

== S ==
- Bryana Salaz (born 1997), singer, actress
- Tyra Sanchez, retired drag performer, winner of the second season of RuPaul's Drag Race
- Phoenix Sanders (born 1995), baseball pitcher in the San Francisco Giants organization
- Warren Sapp (born 1972), professional football player
- Adam Scherr (born 1983), WWE professional wrestler, performed under the ring name "Braun Strowman"
- Chuck Schuldiner (1967–2001), "godfather of death metal", frontman of the metal band Death
- Derrick Sharp (born 1971), American-Israeli professional basketball player
- Brandon Siler (born 1985), professional football player
- Mike Sims-Walker (born 1984), professional football player
- Bridget Sloan (born 1992), Olympic gymnast
- Wesley Snipes (born 1962), film actor, producer
- Scott Stapp (born 1973), rock musician
- Miriam Stockley (born 1962), South African-born British singer
- Amar'e Stoudemire (born 1982), professional basketball player
- Ian Svantesson (born 1993), soccer player

== T ==
- Zakaria Taifi (born 2005), soccer player
- Antonio Tarver (born 1968), professional boxer
- Frances Tiafoe (born 1998), tennis player (originally from Hyattsville, Maryland)
- Jeannie Tirado, voice actress
- Tonstartssbandht, sibling music duo
- Daniel Tosh (born 1975), comedian, host of Tosh.0 on Comedy Central
- Mark Tremonti (born 1974), guitarist and singer

== V ==
- Daniel Vogelbach (born 1992), MLB player
- Jayy Von Monroe (born 1991), rock musician and ex-lead singer of Blood on the Dance Floor

== W ==
- Turner Ward (born 1965), MLB player and coach
- Chris Warren (born 1988), professional basketball player
- Darius Washington, Jr. (born 1985), professional basketball player
- Jemile Weeks (born 1987), MLB infielder
- Raymond L. White (born 1943), geneticist
- Cosmo Wilson (born 1961), concert lighting designer
- Paul Wilson (born 1973), MLB pitcher

== Y ==
- Beto Ydrach (born 2001), soccer player
- Rachel York (born 1971), actress, singer
