= Jan Mulder =

Jan Mulder may refer to:

- Jan Mulder (musician) (born 1963), Dutch pianist, composer, and orchestra conductor
- Jan Mulder (cyclist, born 1878), Dutch track cyclist and speed skater
- Jan Mulder (cyclist, born 1956), Dutch cyclist, see Cycling at the 2004 Summer Paralympics
- Jan Mulder (footballer) (born 1945), Dutch former soccer player and current columnist
- Jan Mulder (politician) (born 1943), Dutch politician People's Party for Freedom and Democracy

== See also ==
- Ian Mulder
