= Favourite Hymns =

Favourite Hymns (UK) or Favorite Hymns (US) may refer to:

== Music ==
- Favorite Hymns, a 1989 album by Glen Campbell
- Your 100 Favourite Hymns, a five-LP Derek Batey series of the 1980s produced by Gordon Lorenz
- Jan Mulder's Favourite Hymns, a 2010 album by Jan Mulder

== Other uses ==
- Aled's Forty Favourite Hymns, a 2009 book by Aled Jones
- My Favourite Hymns, a 1989–1993 UK TV programme with interviewer John Stapleton

== See also ==
- List of English-language hymnals by denomination
