= Divine (surname) =

Divine is a surname. Notable people with the surname include:

- Charles Divine (1889–1950), American poet and playwright
- David Divine (1905–1987), South African writer
- Dreuxilla Divine (born 1974), Puerto Rican drag queen
- Father Divine (c. 1876 – 1965), American religious leader
- Neil Divine (1939–1994), American astrophysicist
- Roscoe Divine (born 1947), American middle-distance runner
- Samuel Raymond Divine (born 1953), Liberian politician and banker
