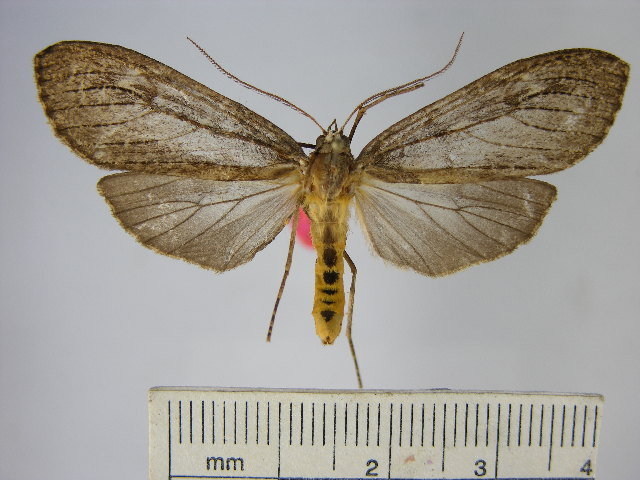

Scientific classification
- Kingdom: Animalia
- Phylum: Arthropoda
- Class: Insecta
- Order: Lepidoptera
- Superfamily: Noctuoidea
- Family: Erebidae
- Subfamily: Arctiinae
- Genus: Calidota
- Species: C. obscurata

Binomial name
- Calidota obscurata (H. Druce, 1884)

Synonyms
- Carales obscurata H. Druce, 1884; Calidota obscurator

= Calidota obscurata =

Species of moth

Calidota obscurata is a species of moth in the family Erebidae. It was first described by Herbert Druce in 1884 and is found in Mexico, Guatemala, Costa Rica and Panama.
