= Calidota lubeckei =

Scientific classification
- Domain: Eukaryota
- Kingdom: Animalia
- Phylum: Arthropoda
- Class: Insecta
- Order: Lepidoptera
- Superfamily: Noctuoidea
- Family: Erebidae
- Subfamily: Arctiinae
- Genus: Calidota
- Species: C. lubeckei

Binomial name
- Calidota lubeckei Beutelspacher, [1986]

Species of moth

Calidota lubeckei is a moth of the family Erebidae. It was described by Carlos Rommel Beutelspacher in 1986. It is found in Mexico.
