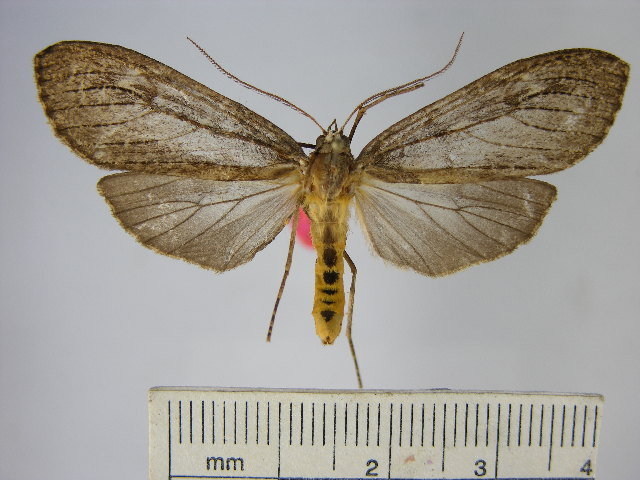
- Calidota obscurator

Scientific classification
- Kingdom: Animalia
- Phylum: Arthropoda
- Class: Insecta
- Order: Lepidoptera
- Superfamily: Noctuoidea
- Family: Erebidae
- Subfamily: Arctiinae
- Subtribe: Phaegopterina
- Genus: Calidota; Dyar, 1901

= Calidota =

Genus of moths

Calidota is a genus of moths in the family Erebidae. The genus was erected by Harrison Gray Dyar Jr. in 1901.

== Species ==
- Calidota bahamensis Rothschild, 1933
- Calidota clarcana Dyar, 1916
- Calidota divina (Schaus, 1889)
- Calidota guzmani Beutelspacher, [1981]
- Calidota lubeckei Beutelspacher, [1986]
- Calidota obscurata (Druce, 1884)
- Calidota paulina (E. D. Jones, 1912)
- Calidota phryganoides (Walker, 1855)
- Calidota strigosa (Walker, 1855) – streaked calidota moth

== Former species ==
- Calidota cubensis (Grote, 1865)
- Calidota hadesia Schaus, 1927
