= Calidota guzmani =

Scientific classification
- Kingdom: Animalia
- Phylum: Arthropoda
- Class: Insecta
- Order: Lepidoptera
- Superfamily: Noctuoidea
- Family: Erebidae
- Subfamily: Arctiinae
- Genus: Calidota
- Species: C. guzmani

Binomial name
- Calidota guzmani Beutelspacher, [1981]

Species of moth

Calidota guzmani is a moth of the family Erebidae. It was described by Carlos Rommel Beutelspacher in 1981. It is found in Mexico.
