= Statue of St. John of Nepomuk in Divina =

National Cultural Monument in Slovakia

Statue of St. John of Nepomuk in Divina Socha sv. Jána Nepomuckého v Divine
- Statue des hl. Johannes von Nepomuk in Divina (German), Статуя на св. Ян Непомуцки в Дивина (Bulgarian)
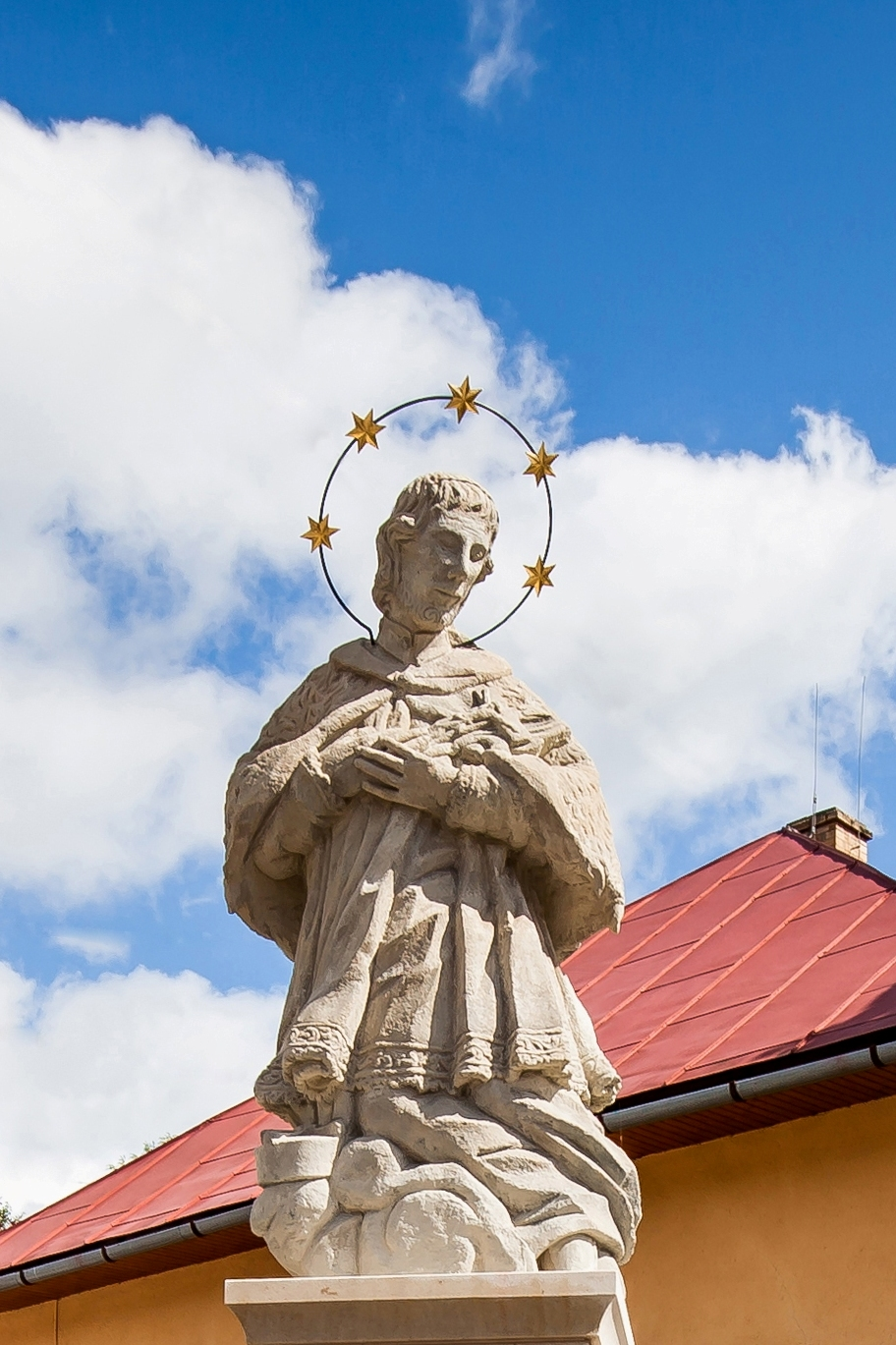
- The statue in June 2017
- Artist: Unknown
- Year: 1796
- Completion date: 2017
- Type: Sculpture
- Medium: Sandstone
- Movement: Late baroque
- Subject: Saint John of Nepomuk
- Dimensions: 150 cm (59 in)
- Condition: Renovation: 1822, 1995, 2017
- Location: Divina, Slovakia
- Owner: Parish of Divina, Roman Catholic Diocese of Žilina

The statue of St. John of Nepomuk in Divina is a National Cultural Monument of Slovakia. Divina is a village and municipality in Žilina District in the Žilina Region of northern Slovakia. In historical records the village was first mentioned in 1325. The Statue of St. John of Nepomuk is registered in the Central List of the Slovak Memorial Fund under the number 1334/2. It is a sandstone sculpture from 1796 standing on a stone base. The statue has a good artistic elaboration of the saint's face and drapery. The saint does not have a traditional biretta on his head. The statue is a remembrance of the last male descendant of the aristocratic Szunyogh family – John Nepomuk Szunyogh, who is credited with the construction of the Divina church and rectory. In Slovakia, there are only few preserved architectural and artistic monuments that belonged to the count branch of the Szunyog family of Budatín. In 1588, the branch was promoted to barons, later counts. The last male descendant was John Nepomuk Szunyogh, who died in 1798, leaving only one daughter Josephine. St. John of Nepomuk was his personal patron, to whom he had a special reverence.

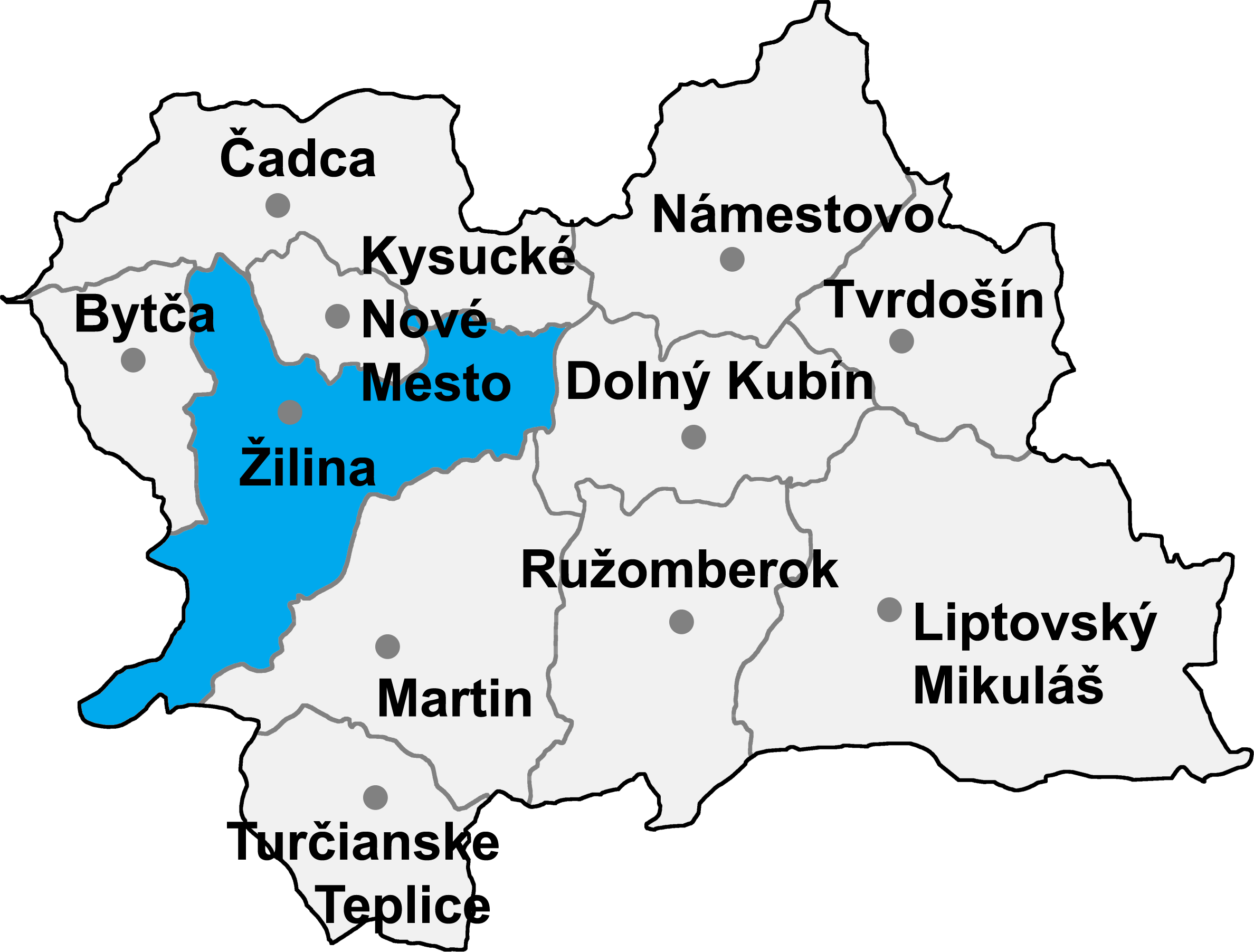
Location of Žilina District in the Zilina Region

== St. John of Nepomuk ==
St. John of Nepomuk, Czech saint, died as a martyr. His tortured body was bound and thrown in the Vltava river. St. John of Nepomuk is one of the most frequently illustrated saints in the territory of the former Habsburg monarchy and there are monuments (mostly statues) of him in almost every village in Slovakia and Czechia. His statues and other monuments are all over the world. The fact that we can find St. John of Nepomuk also in less expected locations only confirms his universal respect. St. John is the patron of confessors, priests, sailors, rafters, millers and protector from drowning or tongue diseases. He is co-patron of the Czech Republic and Bavaria. Many churches and chapels have been consecrated to him in Central and Western Europe. St. John of Nepomuk churches and chapels can be found in Germany, Czechia, Poland, Italy, Slovakia, Slovenia, Austria, Serbia, Lithuania and Hungary. His is also worshipped in Spain. Since 16 May 1758, St. John of Nepomuk has been the patron saint of the Spanish Marine Forces (Infantería de Marina). Outside Europe, there churches and chapels consecrated to him especially in Costa Rica, Colombia, Paraguay, Argentina, Philippines and the USA. Also names of many municipalities in Latin America were given in respect of him.

== History ==
Interesting information about the statue was found in the recently discovered Canonical visitation of Divina from 1828: "On the territory of the parish, there is also on stone statue of St. John Nepomuk, which used to be located at the entrance to the Divina village near the stream along the road in 1796. It was built by the count John Szunyogh. After the fatal massive flood in 1822 that wrecked the entire village from the ground, the statue was swept away. It was found head-less. Later, thanks to the willingness of the count Stephen Csáky, the current patron of the church, it was repaired and placed in front of the rectory on the brick column."

=== Another characteristic ===
- Century: 18th
- Founder: Count John Nepomuk Szunyogh (1796)
- Innovator: Count Stephen Csáky (after 1822)

== International project of restoration ==
The project of restoration of St. John of Nepomuk statue was started in 2016, was completed in June 2017. Partners, who were addressed to cooperate have either some connection to St. John of Nepomuk or to Slovakia.

=== Auspices ===
- Germany: The project was carried out under auspices of the Embassy of the Federal Republic of Germany in Slovakia.

=== Project patrons ===
- Cambodia: His Majesty Norodom Sihamoni, the king of Cambodia
- Bulgaria: His Majesty Simeon II., the last tsar of Bulgaria

=== Project donors ===
- Bavaria: His Royal Highness Franz, Duke of Bavaria
- Vatican: The Equestrian Order of the Holy Sepulchre of Jerusalem (Ordo Equestris Sancti Sepulcri Hierosolymitani – OESSH). Emeritus Pope Benedict XVI gave his support to the restoration of the statue of St. John of Nepomuk.
- Czech Republic: The Knights of the Cross with the Red Star, the only Catholic knight order of Czech origin (Ordo militaris Crucigerorum cum rubea stella in pede pontis Pragensis – O.Cr), Metropolitan Chapter House of St. Vitus in Prague, which is the owner of the saint's grave and the city of Nepomuk – the birthplace of St. John of Nepomuk.
- Slovakia: Diocese of Žilina, municipalities of Divina, Divinka and Svederník. The project was also strongly supported by: Kysuce Museum in Čadca, Kia Motors Slovakia Foundation, the Philatelist Club 53-19 from Žilina and unknown donors.
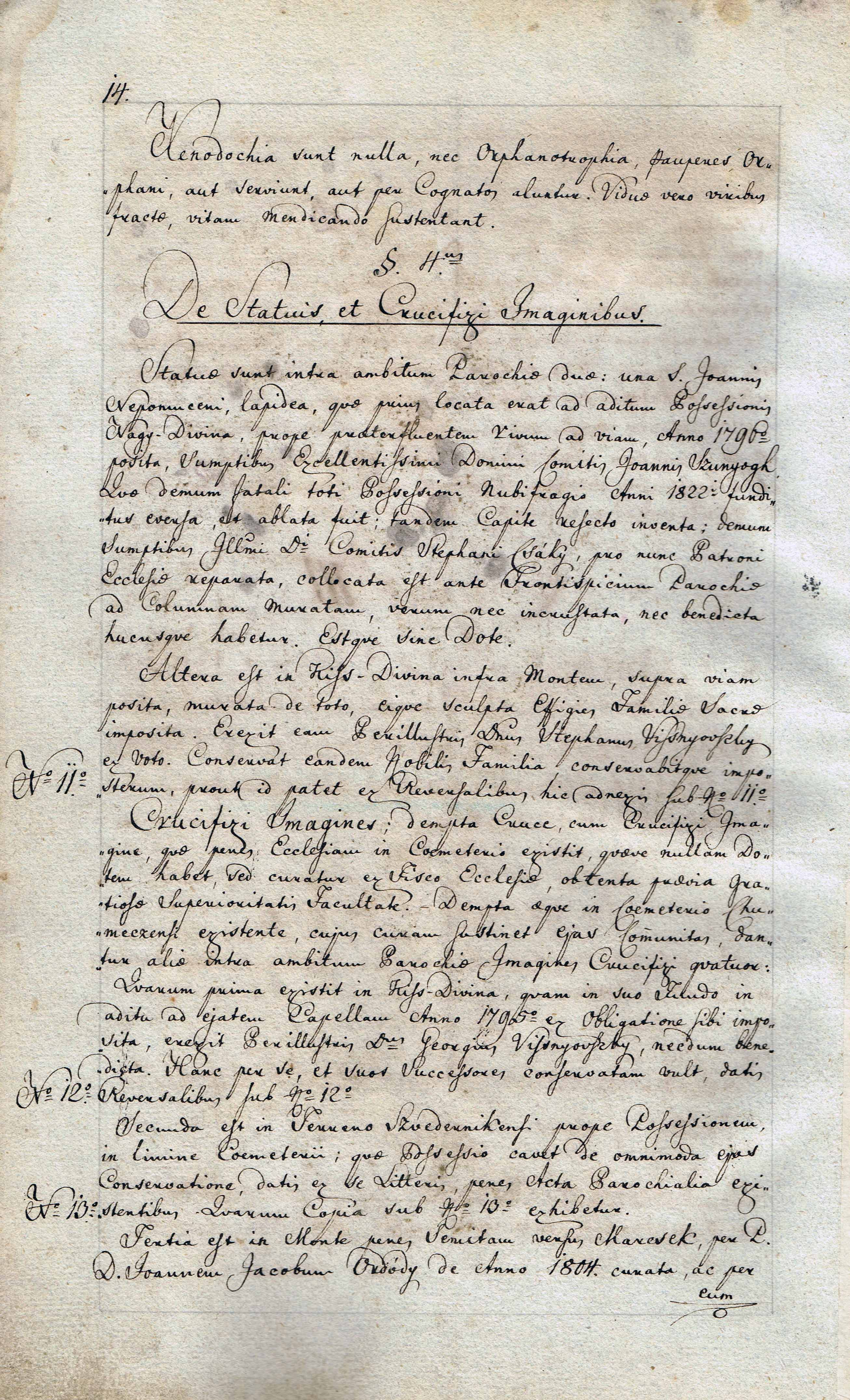
Page from the Canonical Visitation from 1828 mentioning the statue of St. John of Nepomuk

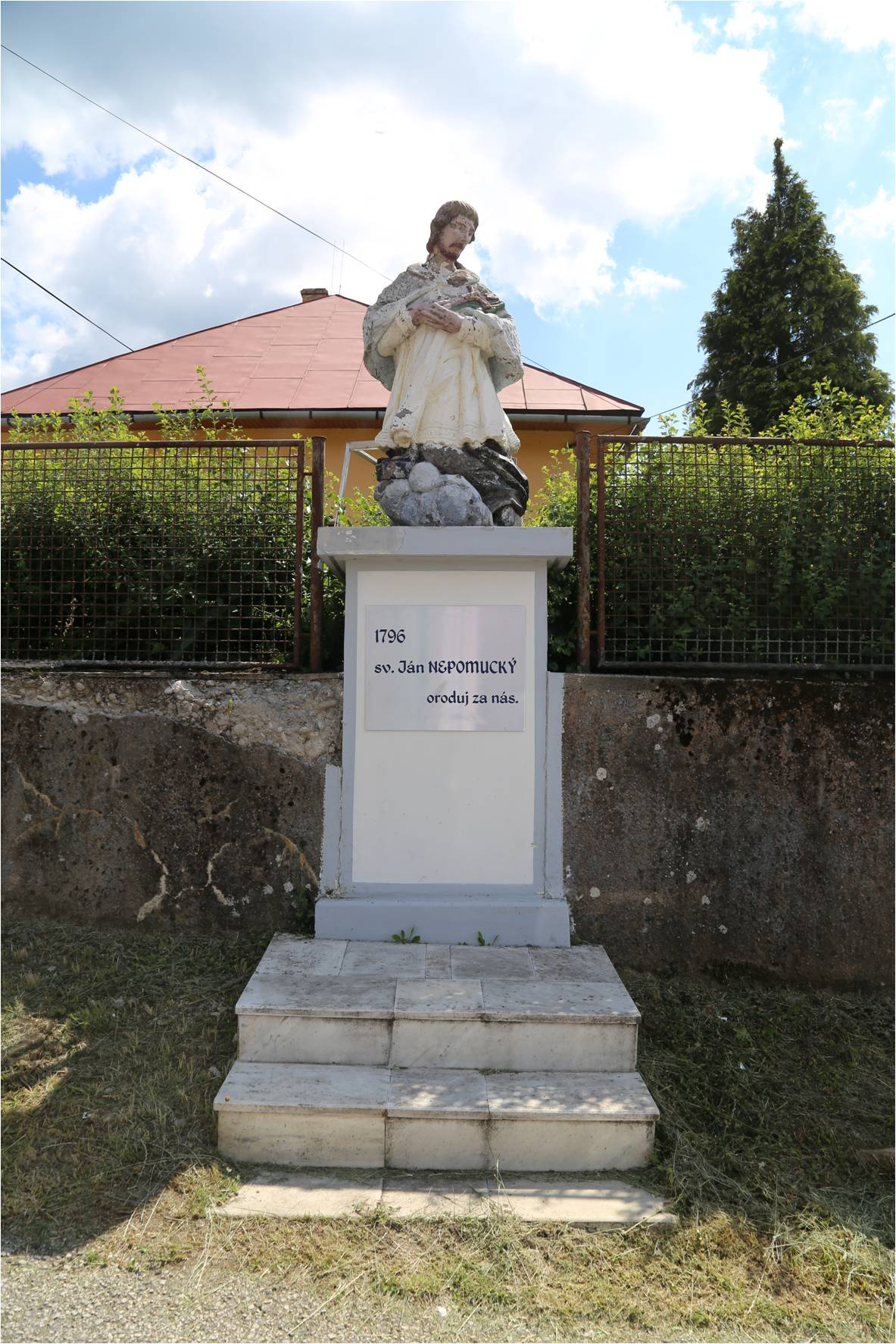
Statue before starting the restoration

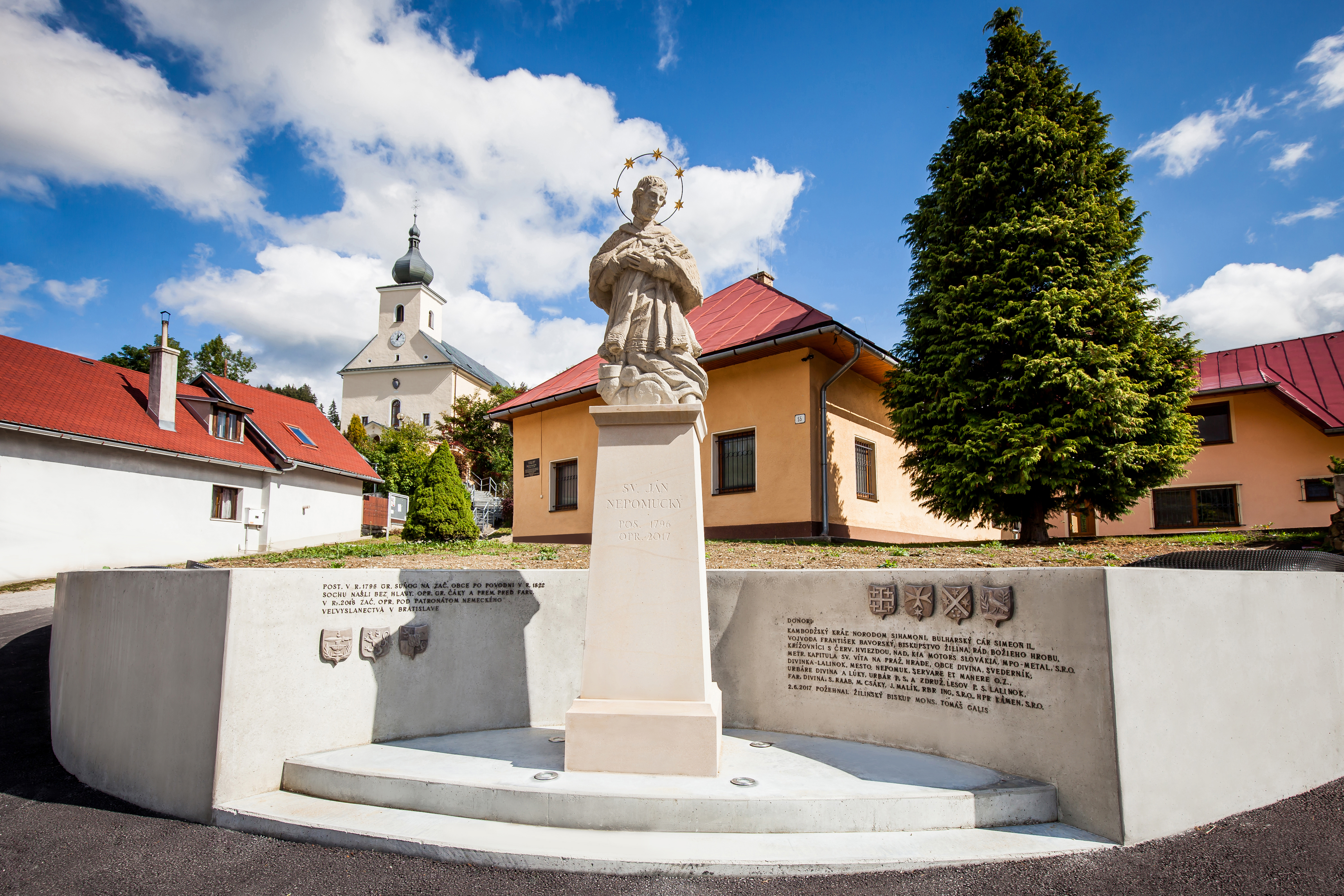
The statue - overall view

=== Blessing ceremony ===
The statue was uncovered on its new stand on Friday 2 June 2017 by Joachim Bleicker, the Ambassador of the Federal Republic of Germany in Slovakia together with Emil Molko, Mayor of Divina. Subsequently, it was blessed by Mons. Tomáš Galis, Bishop of Žilina. It happened more than 190 years since it was restored after being damaged by a flood. Besides the Bishop, Ambassador of Germany and the Head of the Bishop Office, the ceremony was attended also by invited partners. The uncovering and blessing of the statue were followed by a vernissage presenting all partners of the monument restoration on panels.

=== Postal products ===
The Slovak Post issued official postal products on this occasion – stamp, envelopes and stamp coupons.

== Award ==
On November 29, 2018 a solemn announcement of results of the 13th edition of the Phoenix – National Cultural Monument of the Year 2017 competition was held, where four objects were awarded. The Minister of Culture of the Slovak Republic, Ľubica Laššáková handed over the bronze statue of the Phoenix to the owners of these reconstructed Monuments. The Ministry also awarded four Honorable recognitions alongside the main prize. Exceptional realization of the restoration project of the Statue of St. John of Nepomuk in the village of Divina has gained one of these four recognitions.
