= Calidota clarcana =

Scientific classification
- Kingdom: Animalia
- Phylum: Arthropoda
- Class: Insecta
- Order: Lepidoptera
- Superfamily: Noctuoidea
- Family: Erebidae
- Subfamily: Arctiinae
- Genus: Calidota
- Species: C. clarcana

Binomial name
- Calidota clarcana Dyar, 1916

Species of moth

Calidota clarcana is a moth of the family Erebidae. It was described by Harrison Gray Dyar Jr. in 1916. It is found in Mexico.
