= Calidota strigosa =

Streaked calidota moth

Scientific classification
- Kingdom: Animalia
- Phylum: Arthropoda
- Class: Insecta
- Order: Lepidoptera
- Superfamily: Noctuoidea
- Family: Erebidae
- Subfamily: Arctiinae
- Genus: Calidota
- Species: C. strigosa

Binomial name
- Calidota strigosa (Walker, 1855)

Synonyms
- Arctia strigosa Walker, 1855; Sychesia strigosa Walker, 1855; Halysidota laqueata H. Edwards, 1887; Halysidota cubensis Grote, [1866]; Calidota jamaicensis Strand, 1919

Species of moth

Calidota strigosa, the streaked calidota moth, is a moth of the family Erebidae. It was described by Francis Walker in 1855. It is found on the Antilles and from the southern United States (from Florida to Arizona) to Central America.

The wingspan is about 54 mm.

The larvae feed on Guettarda elliptica.
