= Calidota bahamensis =

Scientific classification
- Domain: Eukaryota
- Kingdom: Animalia
- Phylum: Arthropoda
- Class: Insecta
- Order: Lepidoptera
- Superfamily: Noctuoidea
- Family: Erebidae
- Subfamily: Arctiinae
- Genus: Calidota
- Species: C. bahamensis

Binomial name
- Calidota bahamensis Rothschild, 1933

Species of moth

Calidota bahamensis is a moth of the family Erebidae. It was described by Walter Rothschild in 1933. It is found on the Bahamas.
