= Divina (name) =

The name Divina may refer to:

== Given name ==
- Divina de Campo, English drag queen, singer, and actor
- Divina D'Anna (born 1976), Australian politician
- Divina Estrella (born 1956), Dominican Republic sprinter
- Divina Frau-Meigs (born 1959), Moroccan sociologist and professor
- Divina Galica (born 1944), British sportswoman
- Divina Grace Yu, Filipino politician
- Divina Maloum, activist from Cameroon

== Surname ==
- Mascarita Divina (born 1990), ring name of a Mexican Luchador enmascarado
- Nilo Divina (born 1965), Filipino lawyer, professor, author, and educational administrator

== Nickname ==
- La Divina, a nickname for Marie Callas (1923–1977), Greek operatic soprano

== Characters ==
- The lead character in Divina, está en tu corazón, a Spanish-language telenovela
