= Divine (given name) =

Divineis the given name of:

- Divine Deablo (born 1998), American National Football League player
- Divine Naah (born 1996), Ghanaian footballer
- Divine Ndhlukula, Zimbabwean businesswoman
- Divine Oduduru (born 1996), Nigerian sprinter
- Divine Fonjock (born 1984 or 1987), Cameroonian footballer
