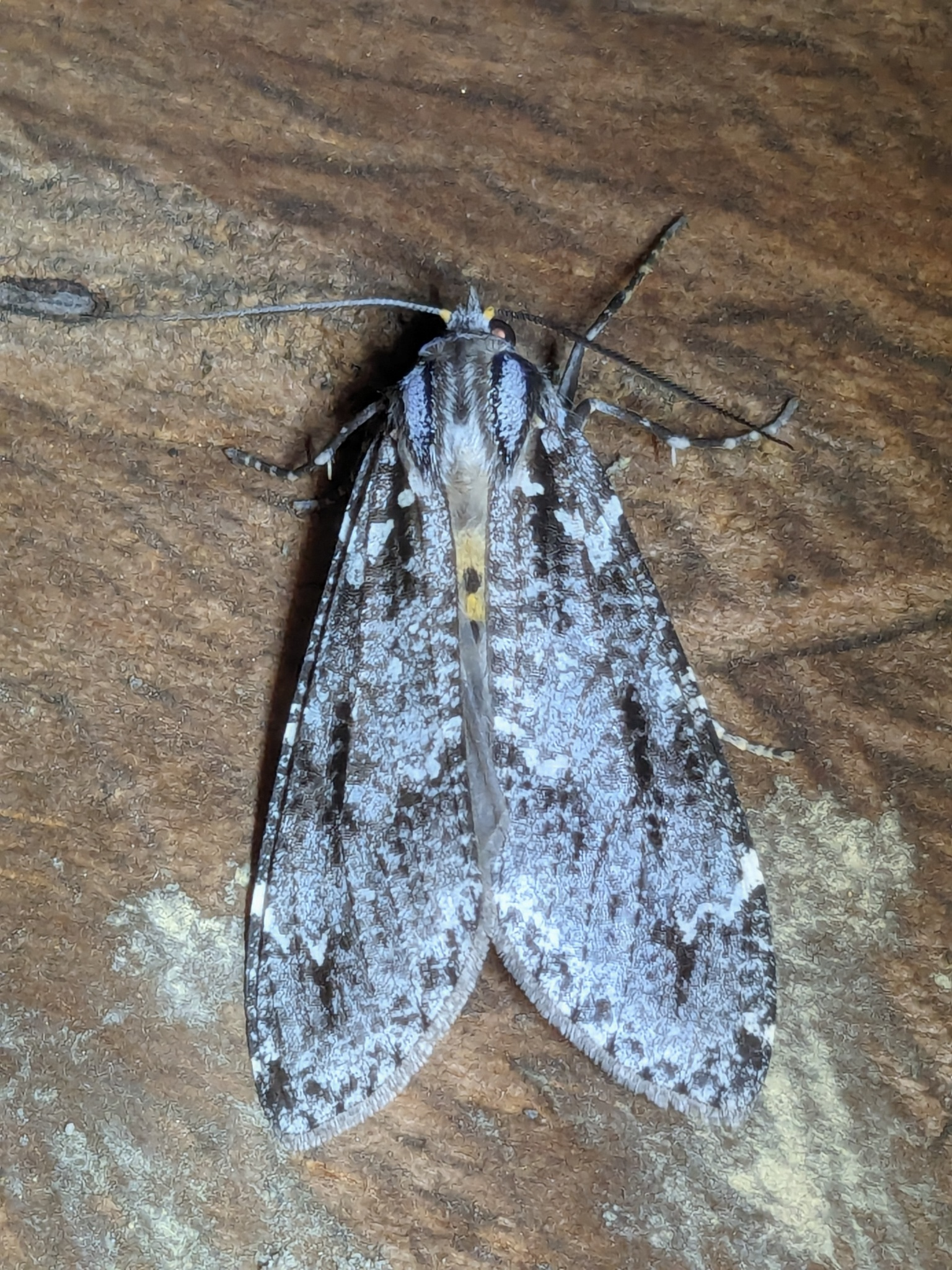

Scientific classification
- Kingdom: Animalia
- Phylum: Arthropoda
- Clade: Pancrustacea
- Class: Insecta
- Order: Lepidoptera
- Superfamily: Noctuoidea
- Family: Erebidae
- Subfamily: Arctiinae
- Genus: Calidota
- Species: C. phryganoides

Binomial name
- Calidota phryganoides (Walker, 1855)

Synonyms
- Carales phryganoides Walker, 1855

= Calidota phryganoides =

Species of moth

Calidota phryganoides is a species of moth in the family Erebidae. It was first described by Francis Walker in 1855. It is found in Mexico.
