= Divine Fonjock =

Cameroonian footballer

Personal information
- Date of birth: 16 January 1987 (age 39)
- Place of birth: Kumba, Cameroon
- Height: 1.78 m (5 ft 10 in)
- Position: Midfielder

Team information
- Current team: Badesse Calcio

Youth career
- –2006: Treviso

Senior career*
Years	Team	Apps	(Gls)
2006–2009	Treviso	16	(1)
2006–2007	→ SPAL (loan)	25	(2)
2008	→ SPAL (loan)	7	(0)
2009–2011	Ravenna	38	(1)
2012–2013	Latina	0	(0)
2013–2014	Sestri Levante	26	(0)
2014–2015	Legnago Salus	11	(1)
2015–2016	Unione Sanremo		
2016–2019	Lavagnese	85	(6)
2019–	Badesse Calcio	0	(0)

International career
2004–2005	Cameroon U20		
- * Club domestic league appearances and goals

Divine Fonjock (born 16 January 1984 or 1987) is a Cameroonian footballer, who plays for Badesse Calcio ASD.

== Biography ==
Born in Kumba, Cameroon, Fonjock left for Italy in 2000. Fonjock was a member of Treviso's reserve from 2003 to 2004 season to 2005–06 season. In 2006, he left for SPAL. He played 25 games in 2006–07 Serie C2. Fonjock was in the pre-season camp of Treviso in 2007–08 Serie B, wore no.26 shirt. In August 2007 Fonjock left for Lanciano on loan with option to become co-ownership deal (along with Wilker), but returned to Treviso in the same window. He went to SPAL on 11 January 2008. FIGC later fined Treviso as the deal was notional, as €30,000 transfer fee was missing. SS Lanciano s.r.l. bankrupted in 2008. Fonjock played in 16 games in 2008–09 Serie B but Treviso FBC 1993 s.r.l. bankrupted in 2009 either.

Fonjock left for Ravenna in 2009. He spent 2 seasons in Lega Pro Prima Divisione (ex- Serie C1). Ravenna also bankrupted in 2011. In July 2011 he had a trial at Serie B newcomer Gubbio. However the club did not offered him a contract. He then trailed in Pergocrema, and Reggiana, neither one offered him a place. In March 2012 Montichiari offered a contract but the deal apparently collapsed.

In July 2012 Fonjock joined Latina pre-season camp. He received his first and last first team call-up for 2012–13 Coppa Italia Lega Pro.

=== International career ===
Fonjock capped for Cameroon in 2005 African Youth Championship qualification.

== Passport controversy ==
In March 2008 Fonjock failed to renew the resident permit. The authority found his Cameroonian personal identity had two different year of birth, 1984 and 1987, which the latter more commonly appeared as his age in football documents. Fonjock later renewed the permit successfully.
