= Stigmella divina =

Scientific classification
- Kingdom: Animalia
- Phylum: Arthropoda
- Clade: Pancrustacea
- Class: Insecta
- Order: Lepidoptera
- Family: Nepticulidae
- Genus: Stigmella
- Species: S. divina

Binomial name
- Stigmella divina Puplesis, Diškus & van Nieukerken, 1997

Species of moth

Stigmella divina is a moth of the family Nepticulidae. It is only known from the western part of Kopet Dag mountains in Turkmenistan and the Central Anatolia and the Sivas Province in Turkey.

Adults are on wing from late June to August.
