= Calidota divina =

Scientific classification
- Domain: Eukaryota
- Kingdom: Animalia
- Phylum: Arthropoda
- Class: Insecta
- Order: Lepidoptera
- Superfamily: Noctuoidea
- Family: Erebidae
- Subfamily: Arctiinae
- Genus: Calidota
- Species: C. divina

Binomial name
- Calidota divina (Schaus, 1889)

Synonyms
- Carales divina Schaus, 1889

Species of moth

Calidota divina is a moth of the family Erebidae. It was described by Schaus in 1889. It is found in Mexico.
