= Divina, Žilina District =

Divina
- Municipality
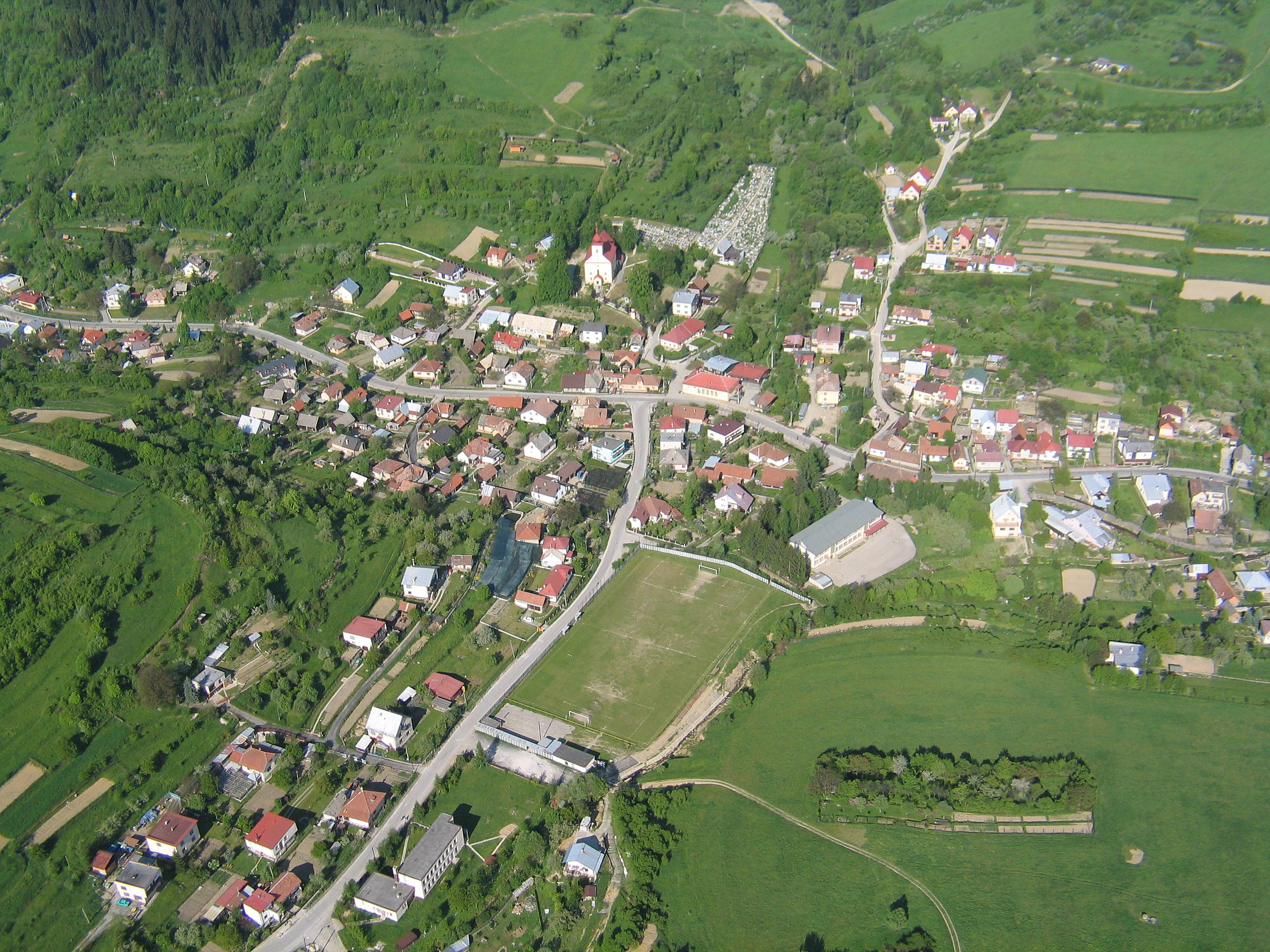

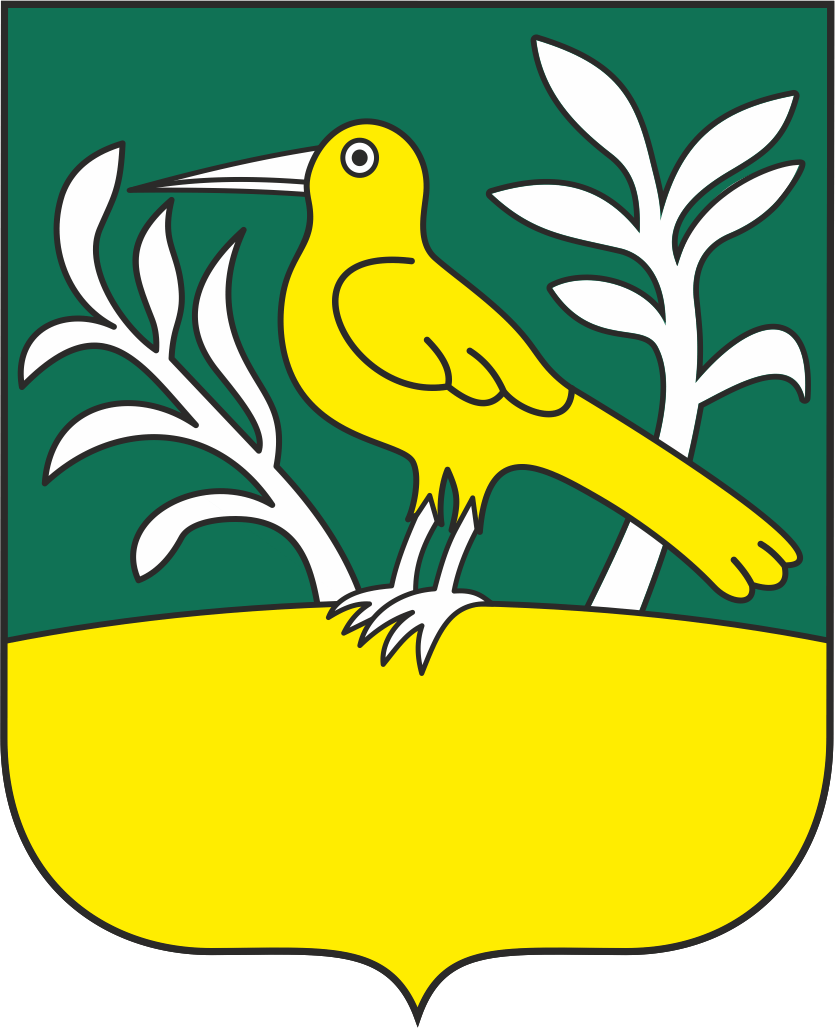
- Flag Coat of arms

- Location of Divina in the Žilina Region Location of Divina in Slovakia
- Coordinates: 49°16′N 18°42′E
- Country: Slovakia
- Region: Žilina Region
- District: Žilina District
- First mentioned: 1325

Area
  - Total: 21.88 km^{2} (8.45 sq mi)
- Elevation: 410 m (1,350 ft)

Population (2025)
  - Total: 2,459
- Time zone: UTC+1 (CET)
  - Summer (DST): UTC+2 (CEST)
- Postal code: 133 1
- Area code: +421 41
- Vehicle registration plate (until 2022): ZA
- Website: www.divina.sk

Divina (Hungarian: Nagydivény) is a village and municipality in Žilina District in the Žilina Region of northern Slovakia.

== History ==
In historical records the village was first mentioned in 1325.

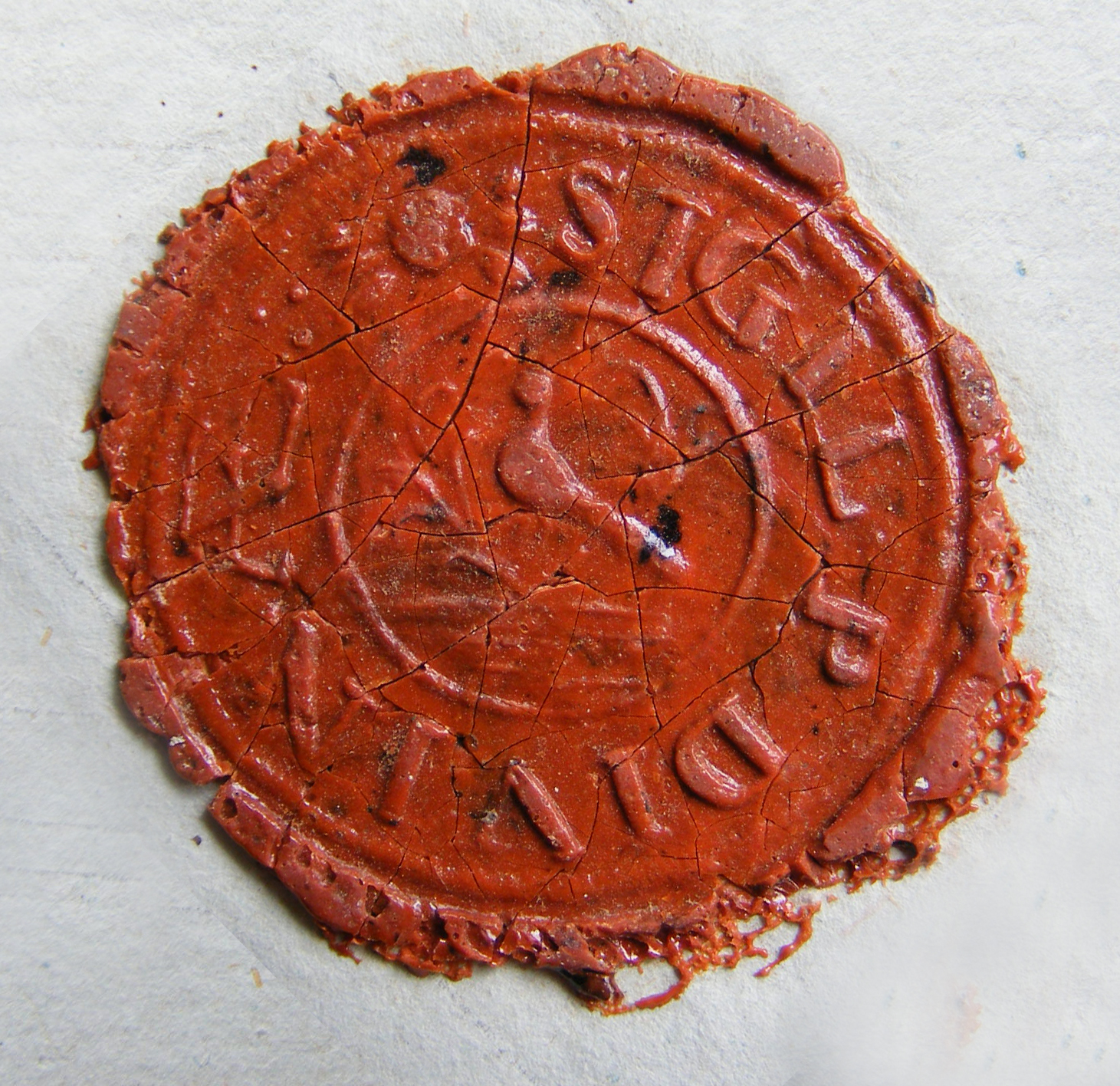
Oldest seal of Divina village

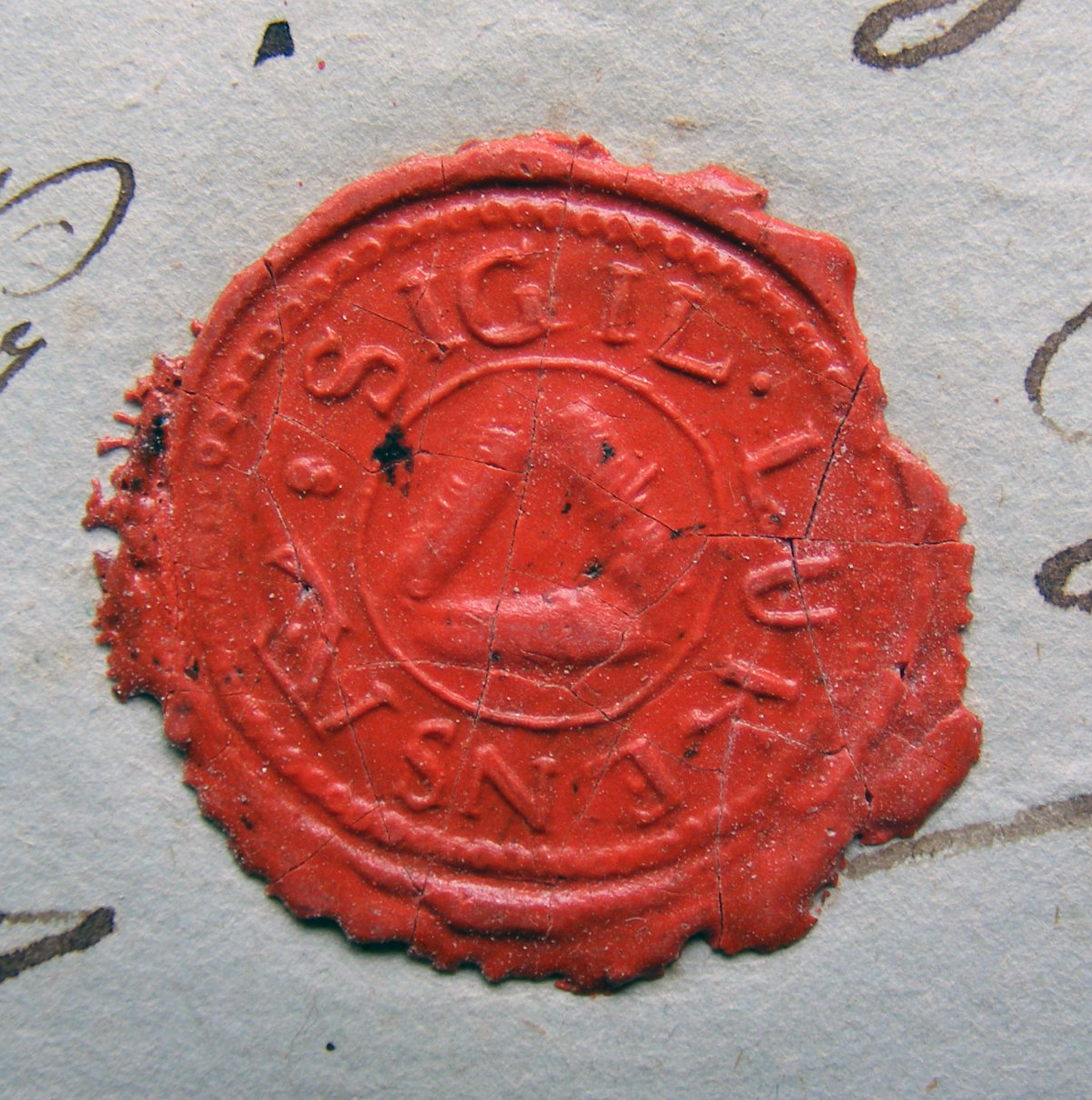
Oldest seal of Lúky village, part of Divina

== Geography ==
The municipality lies at an altitude between 355 – 910 metres (center of the village 550 meters) and covers an area of 21.88 km^{2}.

== Population ==
Population statistic (10 years)
Year	1995	2005	2015	2025
Count	2455	2494	2417	2459
Difference		+1.58%	−3.08%	+1.73%

Population statistic
Year	2024	2025
Count	2456	2459
Difference		+0.12%

It has a population of 2459 people (31 December 2025).

=== Ethnicity ===
Census 2021 (1+ %)
Ethnicity	Number	Fraction
Slovak	2415	98.93%
Total	2441	

In year 2021 was 2441 people by ethnicity 2415 as Slovak, 23 as Czech, 21 as Not found out, 5 as Other, 3 as Hungarian and 1 as Romani.

Note on population: The difference values of population numbers in the table "Population statistic" and in the sections "Ethnicity" & "Religion" is caused by the use of various statistical methods.

=== Religion ===
Census 2021 (1+ %)
Religion	Number	Fraction
Roman Catholic Church	2151	88.12%
None	199	8.15%
Not found out	25	1.02%
Total	2441	

In year 2021 was 2441 people by religion 2151 from Roman Catholic Church, 199 from None, 25 from Not found out, 22 from Christian Congregations in Slovakia, 20 from Greek Catholic Church, 7 from Evangelical Church, 6 from Ad hoc movements, 3 from Calvinist Church, 3 from Jehovah's Witnesses, 1 from Eastern Orthodox Church, 1 from Paganism and natural spirituality, 1 from Other, 1 from Czechoslovak Hussite Church and 1 from Buddhism.

== Monuments and Memorials ==
=== Church of St. Andrew ===
Late baroque church, built between 1773 and 1779 by John Nepomuk Szunyogh. The church is registered in the Central List of the Slovak Memorial Fund under the number 1333/1.

=== Statue of St. John of Nepomuk in Divina ===
The Statue of St. John of Nepomuk is registered in the Central List of the Slovak Memorial Fund under the number 1334/2. It is a sandstone sculpture from 1796 standing on a stone base. The project of restoration of St. John of Nepomuk statue was started in 2016, was completed in June 2017. Partners, who were addressed to cooperate have either some connection to St. John of Nepomuk or to Slovakia and was from: Germany, Cambodia, Bulgaria, Bavaria, Vatican and Czech Republic. The project was carried out under auspices of the Embassy of the Federal Republic of Germany in Slovakia. Exceptional realization of the restoration project of the state has gained an Honorable recognition by Minister of Culture of the Slovak Republic, Ľubica Laššáková on the 13th edition of the competition Phoenix – National Cultural Monument of the Year 2017.

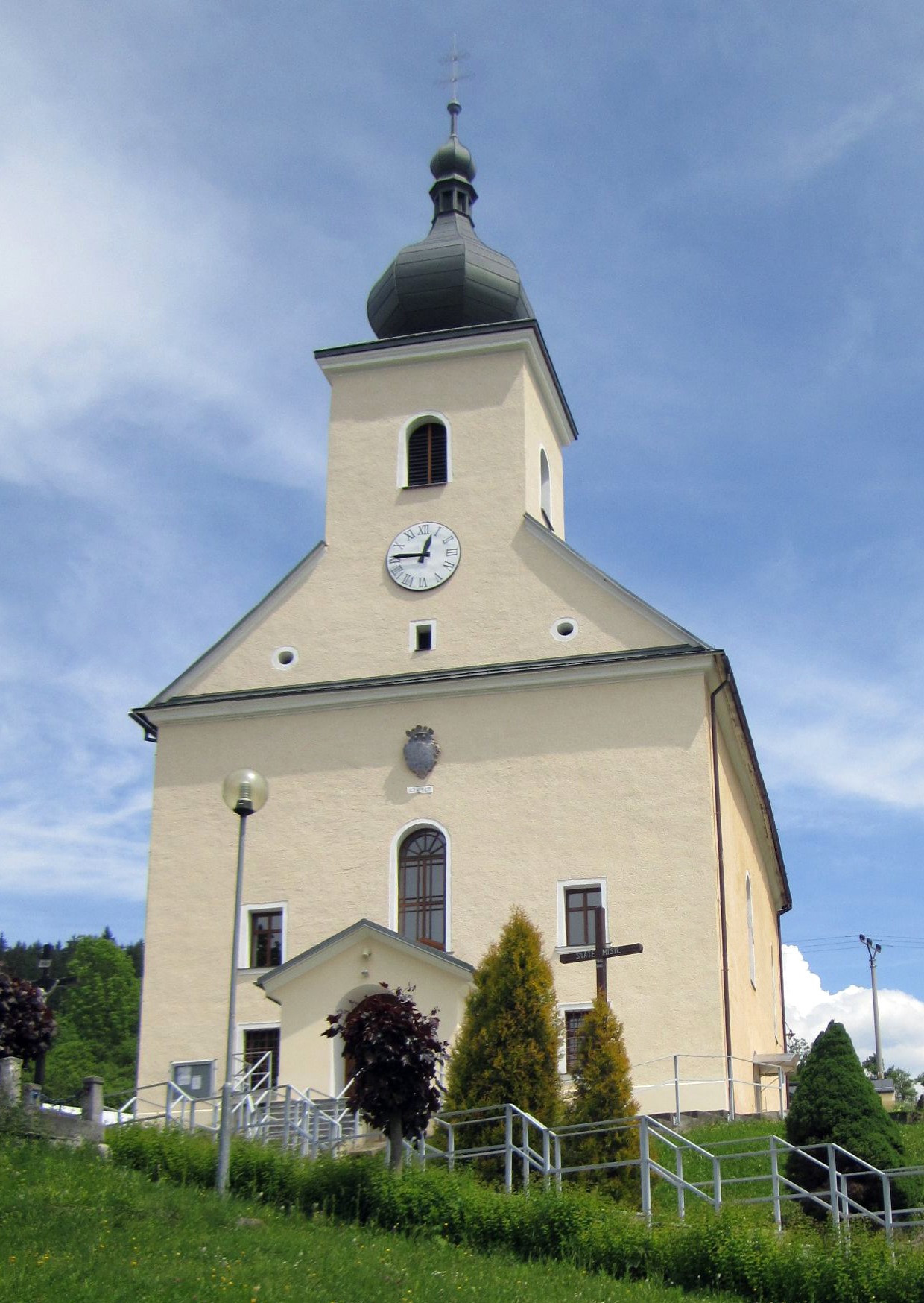
Church of St. Andrew in Divina

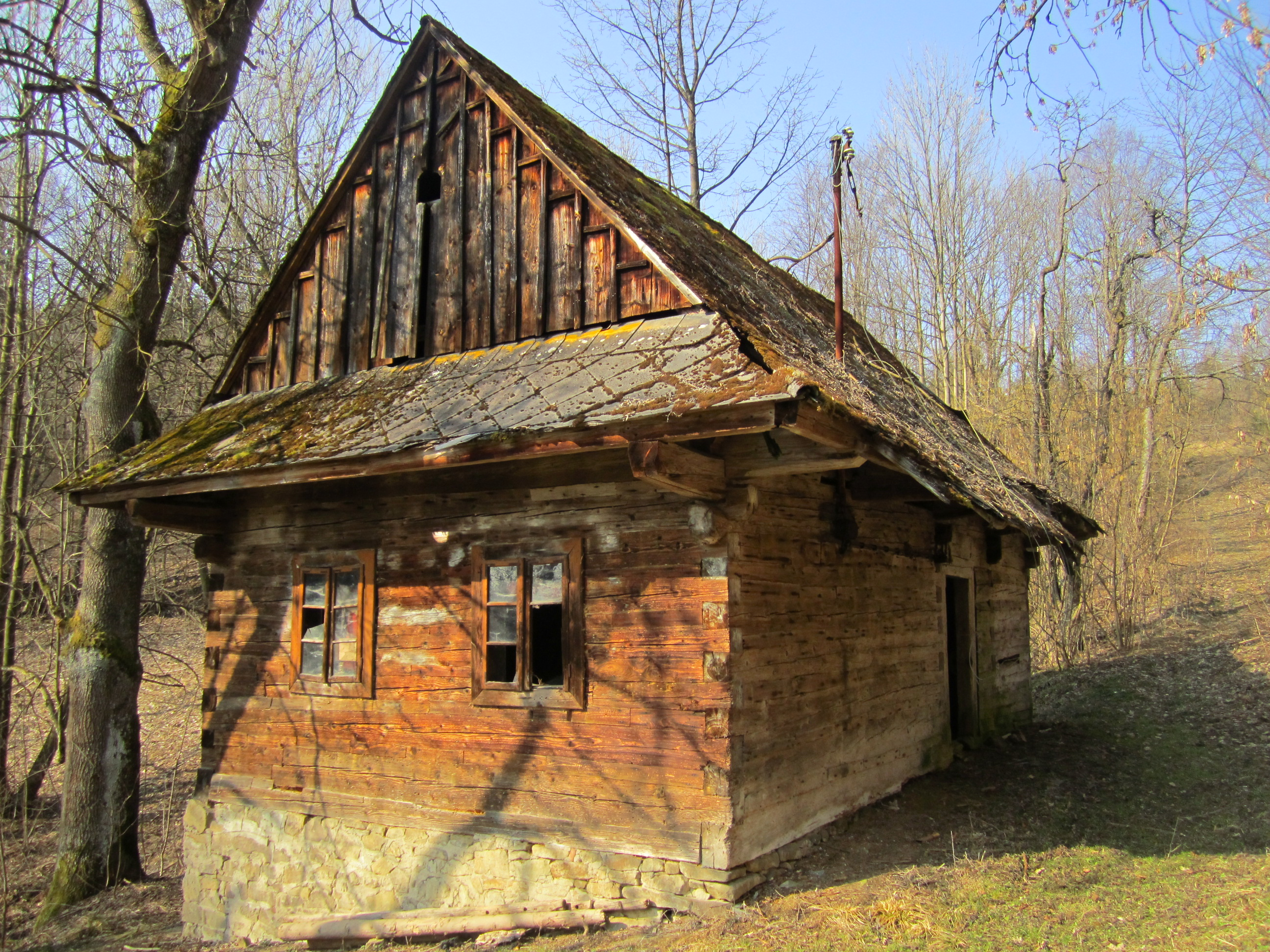
Typical folk house from Divina, built 1907

=== Monument of Divina Meteorite ===
Meteorit from Divina (official name Gross-Divina) fell into the center of the village on July 24, 1837. From the mineralogical point of view it is a chondrite. The weight was 10.5 kg. The architect used a corten steel for the construction. The memorial contains a precise 3D copy of the meteorite. The original is in the Hungarian Natural History Museum as well as the Natural History Museum Vienna.

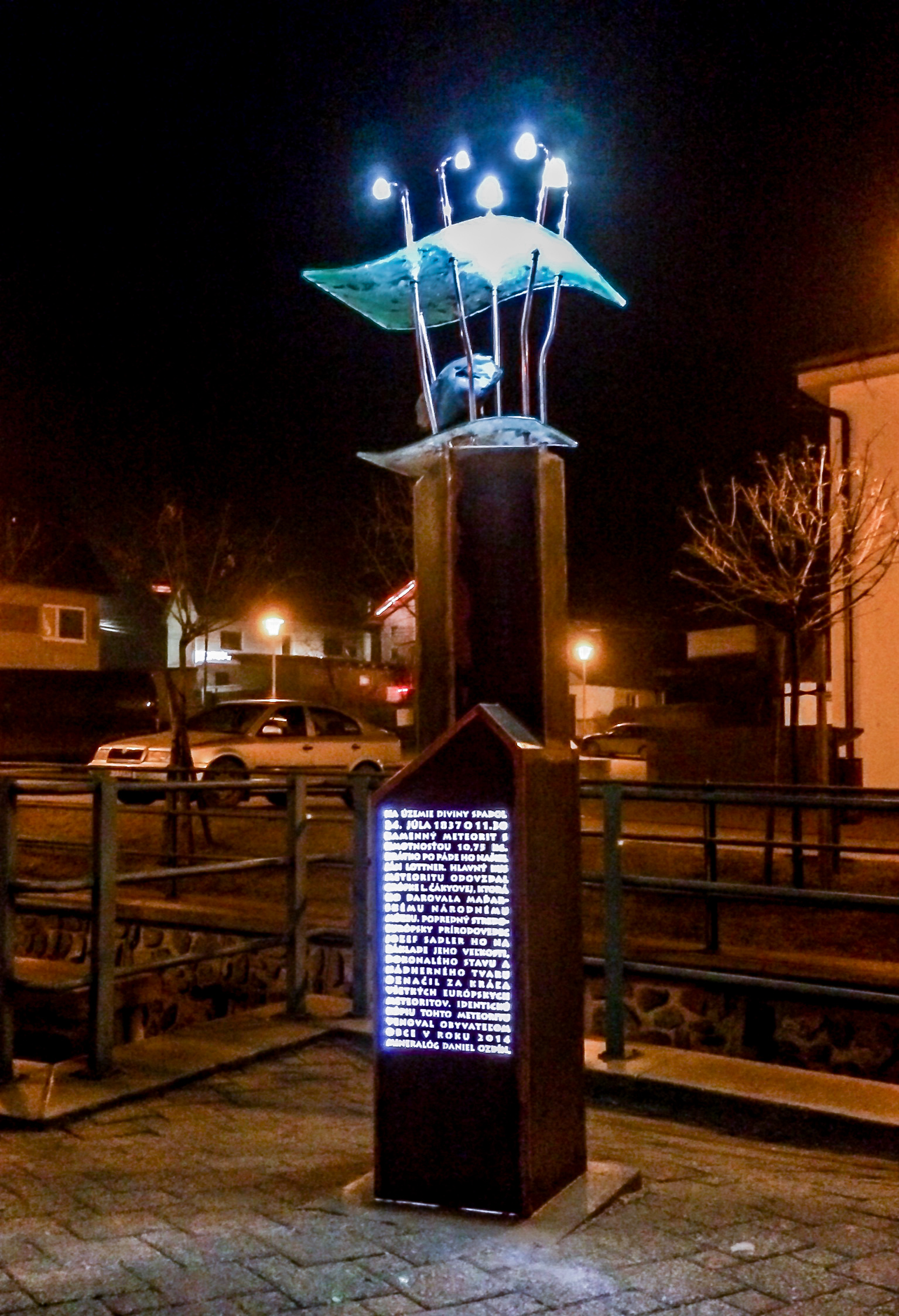
Monument of Divina Meteorite

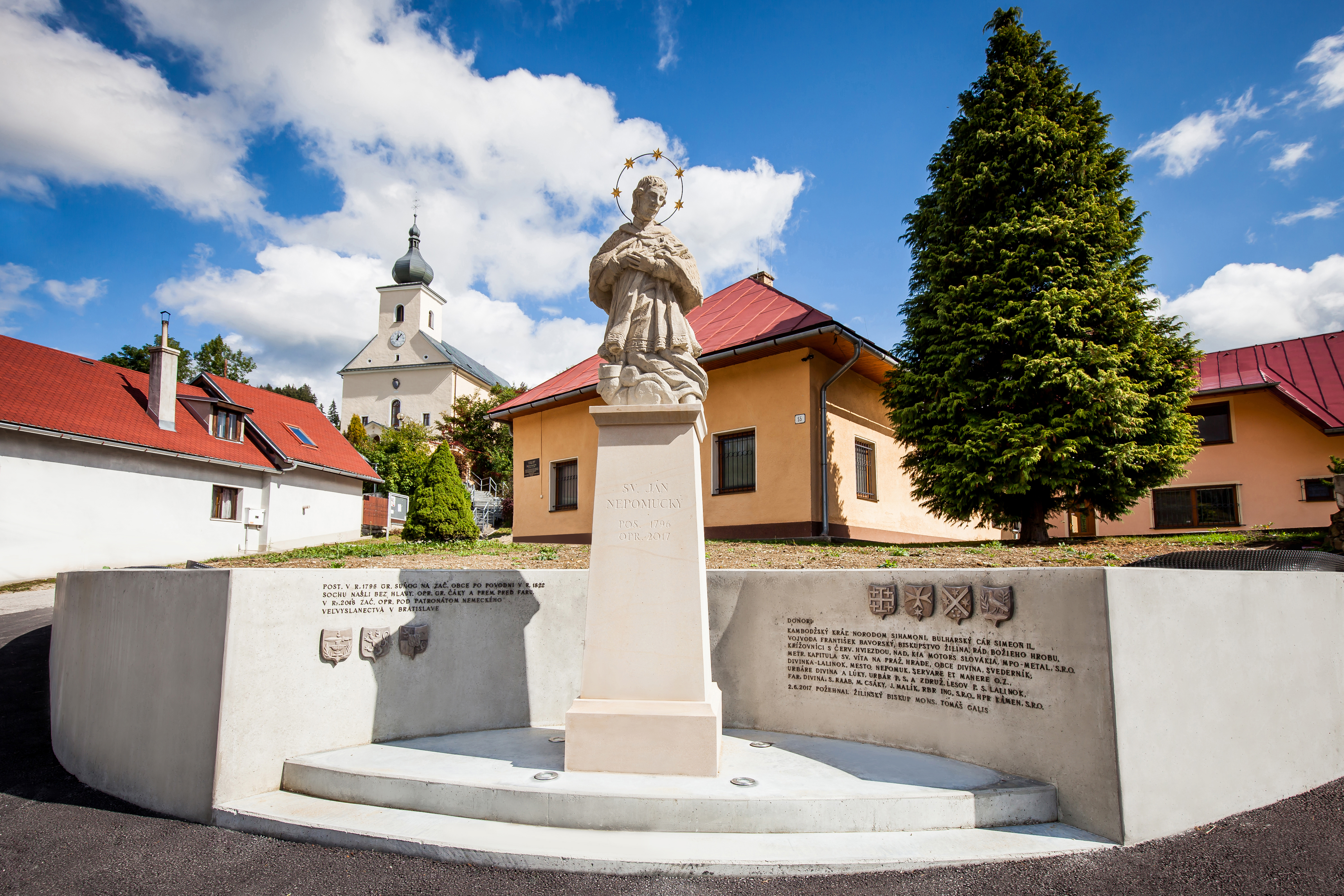
Statue of St. John of Nepomuk in Divina

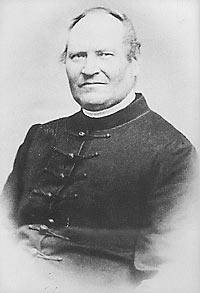
Štefan Závodník

== Personalities and natives ==
- Štefan Závodník (*2. 9. 1813, Horná Poruba – † 12. 2. 1885, Pružina) was a Roman Catholic priest, pedagogue, important personality of Slovak national past and pioneer of bee-keeping in Slovakia. He was also the organizer of the first Upper Hungarian societies. In the years 1836 – 1841 he worked as a chaplain in Divina and between 1841 – 1850 he was a Roman Catholic priest in Divina.

== Genealogical resources ==
The records for genealogical research are available at the state archive "Štátny archív v Žiline so sídlom v Bytči".

- Roman Catholic church records (births/marriages/deaths): 1771-1898 (parish A).

== See also ==
- List of municipalities and towns in Slovakia
