= Divina Frau-Meigs =

Moroccan-born French sociologist

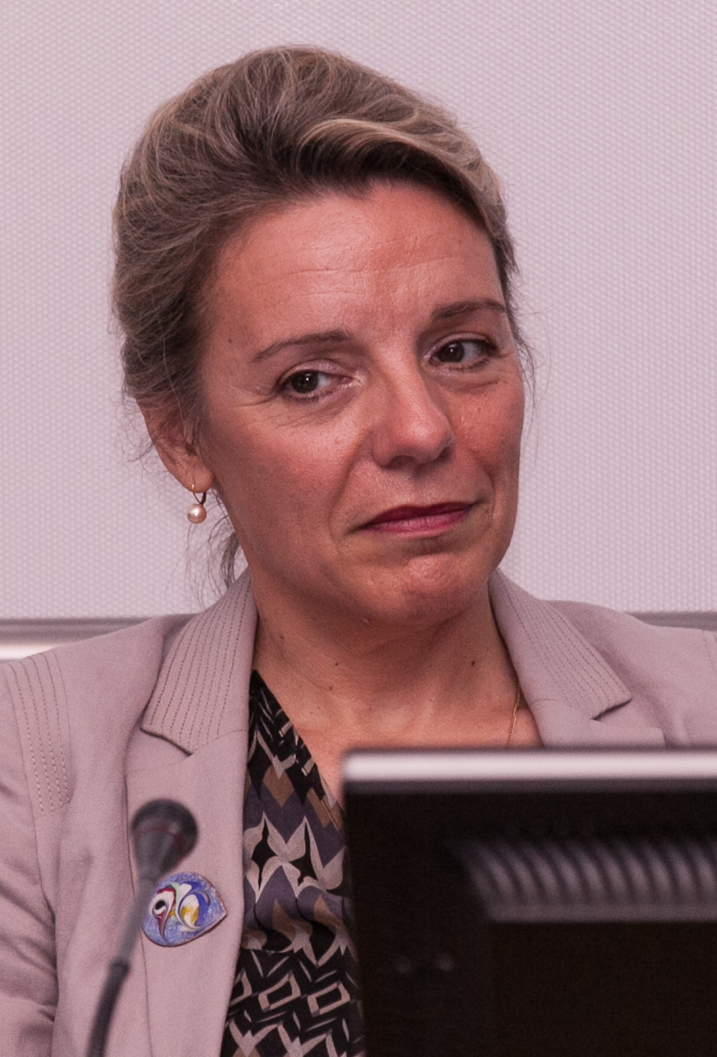
- Frau-Meigs in 2014
- Born: 9 June 1959 (age 67); Casablanca, Morocco
- Occupations: Sociologist of media; professor
- Board member of: European Communication Research and Education Association
- Awards: E-Toile d'Or Civil Society Award; Global Media and Information Literacy Award

Academic background
- Education: Paris-Panthéon-Assas University
- Thesis: Les flux télévisuels internationaux : figures, systèmes analogiques et transferts culturels. Une analyse comparée des contenus des programmes télévisuels dans neuf pays du monde et du rôle des USA dans la production de ces contenus (1993)
- Doctoral advisor: Josette Poinssac

Academic work
- Discipline: Sociology of media
- Institutions: Sorbonne Nouvelle University Paris III

Divina Frau-Meigs (born 9 June 1959) is a Moroccan-born sociologist of media and professor at the Sorbonne Nouvelle University Paris III (Paris III) in France where her areas of research include, cultural diversity, dynamic identities, human/children's rights, internet governance, media education, media matrices, media in English-speaking countries, and risky content. Her research has also included media content and risk behaviors, the reception and use of Information and communications technology, and American studies. She is the chair of "Savoir-devenir in sustainable digital development" for UNESCO and coordinator of "TRANSLIT" for the Agence nationale de la recherche.

== Early life and education ==
Divina Frau-Meigs was born in Casablanca, Morocco, on 9 June 1959, to Spanish parents.

She graduated from the École normale supérieure de lettres et sciences humaines (English, 1980) and received her master's degree from Stanford University (Education and Communication, 1984). She then taught English at Sorbonne Paris North University (1985-1988), before returning to the U.S. to obtain a second master's degree from the Annenberg School for Communication at the University of Pennsylvania (Communication, 1991). In the 1980s, Frau-Meigs was a recipient of a Fulbright (1983–84), Ministry of Higher Education (1984-85), and "Lavoisier" (1988-189) scholarships.

Back in France, she taught high school (Aubervilliers, La Courneuve; 1991-1993) and completed a doctorate in 1993 in information and communication sciences at Paris-Panthéon-Assas University, writing a dissertation under the direction of Josette Poinssac on Les flux télévisuels internationaux : figures, systèmes analogiques et transferts culturels. Une analyse comparée des contenus des programmes télévisuels dans neuf pays du monde et du rôle des USA dans la production de ces contenus (International television flows: figures, analog systems and cultural transfers. A comparative analysis of the contents of television programs in nine countries of the world and the role of the USA in the production of these contents).

== Career and research ==
In 1993, Frau-Meigs was elected Associate Professor at Paris III. In 1999, she obtained her habilitation to direct research at the Paris III with a dissertation entitled, De la télévision aux sous-cultures de l'écran: la représentation dans tous ses états, aux États-Unis (From television to screen subcultures: representation in all its states, in the United States). In 1999, she was promoted to professor at the University of Orléans, before returning to Paris III in 2004. In 2006, she held the information-communication chair at the Autonomous University of Barcelona, giving a doctoral course on cultural diversity in globalization.

Frau-Meigs is a specialist in media, content, and risky behaviors (violence, pornography, information, media panics) as well as in questions of reception and use of information and communication technologies (acculturation, education, regulation). She directs a research center, the "Center for Research on the English-Speaking World" (CREW, ÉA 4399) in Paris III. She also directs a professional master's degree entitled "Computer Applications: Management, Studies, Multimedia, eLearning" (AIGÉME) at the same university, with a double specialization: "Distance Learning Engineering" and "Media Literacy Engineering" (face-to-face and distance learning courses).

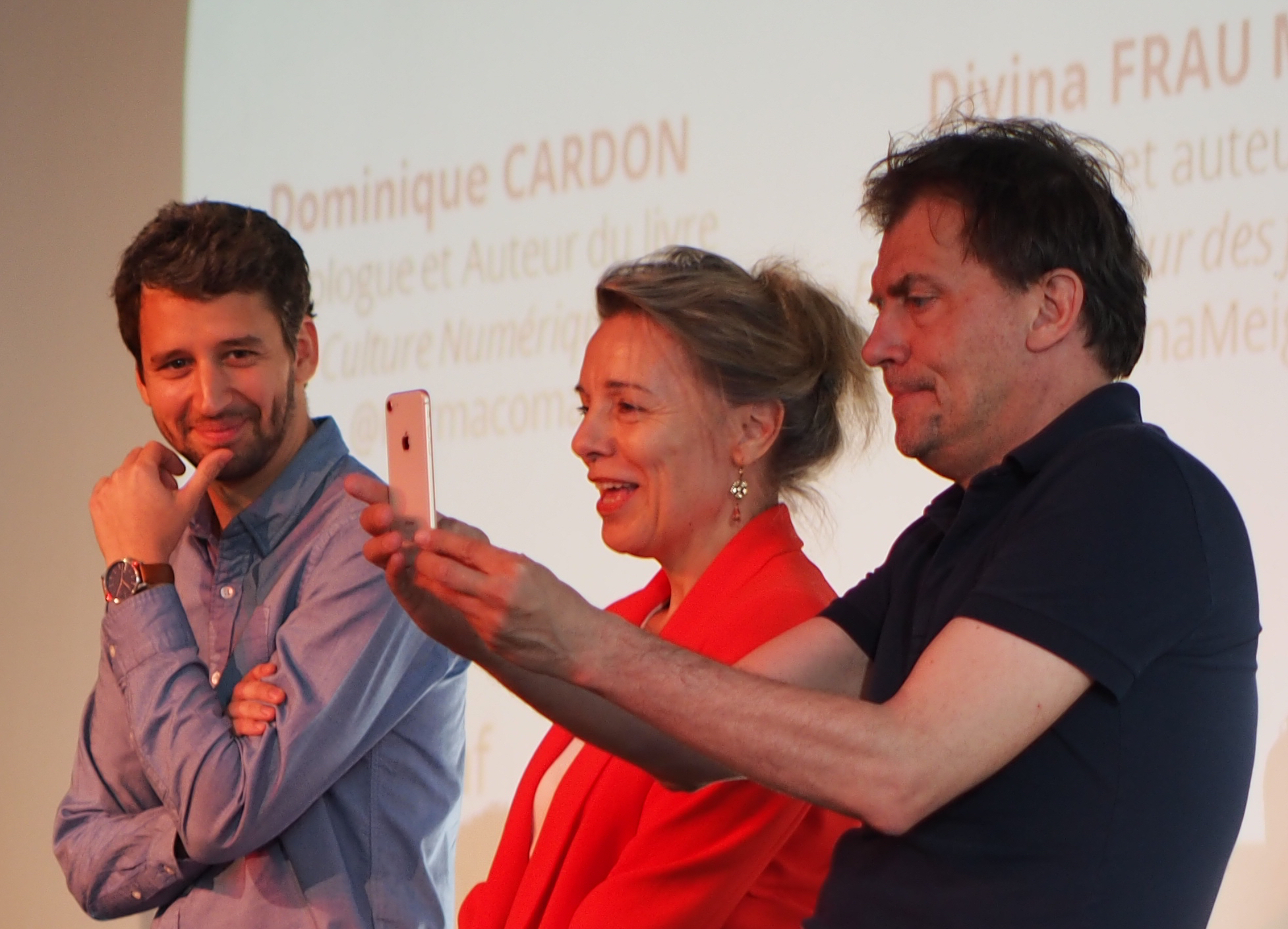
2019 panel with journalist Vincent Coquaz, Divina Frau-Meigs, and sociologist Dominique Cardon (l-r)

The author of more than 300 articles and approximately 30 books, Frau-Meigs has published on issues of cultural diversity and acculturation, as well as on e-learning, digital identity, and internet governance. Her collaborative works have included Les écrans de la violence (The screens of violence) (with Sophie Jehel, published by Economica) and Médias et Technologies : L'exemple américain (Media and technology: the American example) (with Francis Bordat and John Dean, published by Ellipses). She has served as co-editor of Revue Française d'Etudes Américaines (French journal of American studies). She has served as vice-president for international relations of the French Society for Information and Communication Sciences (1993–96) and vice-president of the International Association for Information and Communication Studies and Research (IAMCR) (2002–08). In 2000, she was a founding member of the European Consortium for Communications Research (ECCR). Frau-Meigs is a member of the Scientific Council of the Inter-Associative Collective "Enfance-Médias" (CIEM) (2003-). She sits on the board of the European Communication Research and Education Association (ECREA) (2008-).

== Awards and honours ==
- 2006, E-Toile d'Or Civil Society Award, AUTRANS 2006, Grenoble
- 2016, Global Media and Information Literacy (MIL) Award

== Selected works ==
- Écrans de la violence, Economica, 1997 (with Sophie Jehel) (in French)
- Médias et technologies : l’exemple des États-Unis, Ellipses, collection "Universités : anglais", 2001 ISBN 2-7298-0608-3 (in French)
- Médiamorphoses américaines, Economica, 2001 (with Francis Bordat and John Dean) ISBN 2-7178-4339-6 (in French)
- Dossier de l’audiovisuel, number 108 "Les programmes jeunesse : réenchanter la télévision", March–April 2003 (director) (in French)
- Jeunes, médias, violences, Economica, 2003 (public version of the report of the Interassociative Collective "Childhood and Media" - CIEM, Environnement médiatique : que transmettons-nous à nos enfants) (with Sophie Jehel) (in French)
- Qui a détourné le 11 septembre ? Journalisme, information et démocratie aux États-Unis, Ina-de Boeck, collection "Médias recherches", 2006 ISBN 2-8041-4999-4 (in French)
- Kit pour l’éducation aux médias à l’usage des enseignants, des parents et des professionnels, Unesco, 2007 (pdf) (director) (in French)
- Mapping Media Education Policies in the World: Visions, Programmes and Challenges, Unesco, Alliance des civilisations, 2009 (pdf) (with Jordi Torrent)
- Médias et cognition sociale : dépasser les paniques médiatiques, Érès, 2010 (in French)
- Media Matters in the cultural contradictions of the information society. Towards a human rights-based governance, Presses du Conseil de l’Europe, 2010
- Penser la société de l'écran : dispositifs et usages, Presses Sorbonne nouvelle, collection "Les fondamentaux de la Sorbonne nouvelle", 2011 ISBN 978-2-87854-512-8 (in French)
- Socialisation des jeunes et éducation aux médias : du bon usage des contenus et comportements à risque, Érès, collection "Éducation et société", 2011 ISBN 978-2-7492-1482-5 (in French)
- Faut-il avoir peur des fake news ?, Documentation française, 2019 ISBN 978-2-11-145635-8 (in French)
