= Neil Divine =

American astrophysicist

- Born: Theodore Neil Divine; 1939; Orlando, Florida, U.S.
- Died: 1994 (aged 54–55); Los Angeles, California, U.S.
- Education: Massachusetts Institute of Technology (B.S.); University of Michigan (M.S.); California Institute of Technology (Ph.D.)
- Scientific career
- Fields: Stellar and planetary astrophysics
- Workplaces: Jet Propulsion Laboratory
- Thesis: Structure and evolution of model helium stars (1965)
- Doctoral advisor: John Beverley Oke

Theodore Neil Divine (1939–1994) was an American stellar astrophysicist and planetary scientist whose work centered on the understanding of star formation.

== Early life and education ==
Divine was born in Orlando, Florida and raised in Dorset, Vermont. He is the son of Dorothy Land Divine. He attended Eaglebrook School and Hebron Academy. Divine was the winner of the Hebron senior prize for scholarship. He also received prizes for outstanding performance in chemistry and mathematics. Divine lettered in swimming, was on the staff of the school newspaper, and was a member of the Glee Club and Record Club.

He completed a B.S. in physics from Massachusetts Institute of Technology (MIT) in 1959. Divine was a varsity swimmer at MIT. He won 2 trophies and a medal in the interclass swimming championships where he came first in the backstroke event. He earned a M.S. in physics from University of Michigan. Divine was awarded a full tuition scholarship and the position of research assistant to pursue graduate studies at California Institute of Technology (Caltech). In the summer of 1960, Divine was the waterfront director of Camp Becket. Divine switched from astronomy to astrophysics while completing doctoral research at Caltech. In the summer of 1961, Divine worked in the planetary sciences division at the RAND Corporation. He earned a Ph.D. in astronomy at Caltech in 1965 where he developed the first numerical model of the evolution of helium stars, before they were confirmed to exist. His dissertation was titled Structure and evolution of model helium stars. His doctoral advisor was John Beverley Oke. This research is part of current star formation theory.

== Career ==
Divine worked at the Jet Propulsion Laboratory for 25 years. His research yielded fundamental scientific contributions helping to define complex environments space probes face. Divine studied radiation belts and the dust environment of Halley's Comet. He characterized meteoroid environments and other small interplanetary bodies including asteroid fragments. He worked missions including the Voyager, Galileo Probe, CRAF, and Cassini–Huygens. He served as a mentor for younger space physicists.

Since 1974, Divine was a member of American Geophysical Union's Planetology section.

== Personal life ==
Divine identified as gay and was a resident of Los Angeles. He died in 1994 of AIDS-related complications. Donations in Divine's name were made to AIDS Project Los Angeles.
