= Ian Mulder =

Dutch-born pianist and composer

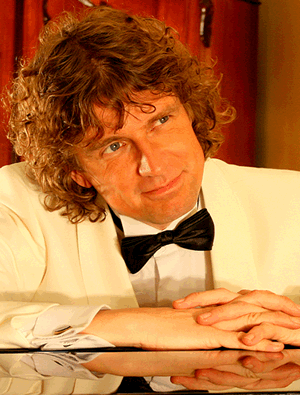
Ian Mulder in Orlando, Florida

Ian Mulder (Dutch pronunciation: [jɑˈmʏldər]) is a Dutch-born pianist and composer, who lives in Orlando, Florida. He performs in the United States and Europe, playing the piano and conducting an orchestra simultaneously, and has 20 solo albums to his name. His 7-album inspirational album series Love Divine, recorded with the London Symphony Orchestra, Royal Philharmonic Orchestra, and London Philharmonic Orchestra are popular in over 20 countries and have achieved gold and platinum status.

== Biography ==
Mulder was born in Rotterdam; he studied piano, organ and composition at the Rotterdam and Utrecht conservatories. Since graduating in 1992, Ian Mulder composes music for his solo albums and concerts. His piano albums, recorded with symphony orchestras in London and Moscow, are frequently played on SiriusXM, Classic FM and other stations.

In 2013, he recorded his second album with the London Symphony Orchestra, Love Divine, which reached platinum status 10 weeks from its release date. That same album was nominated for the 2014 GMA Dove Awards: Instrumental Album of the Year. His 2014 album with the London Symphony Orchestra, named Christmas, featured Andrea Bocelli singing "A choir of a thousand angels". In 2021, his latest album Love Divine VII was released, featuring the Royal Philharmonic Orchestra.

On May 6, 2023, following the coronation of King Charles the III earlier that day, he performed at The Coronation Prom at Royal Albert Hall in London.

== Career highlights ==
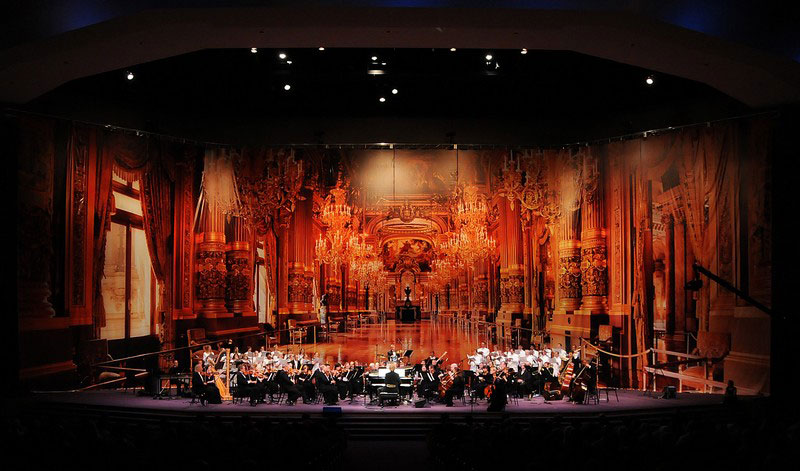
Ian Mulder and his orchestra

- Compositions: 1093
- CDs: 210
- Record Company: Miller Music USA / Universal
- Dove Award Nominations: 1
- International Award: 1
- Gold and Platinum Records: 5
- CDs and DVDs sold: 1 million
- Musical style: inspirational, romantic, light classical, film music

== Discography ==
- Ecossaise (2000)
- Ecossaise 2 (2001)
- Ecossaise Christmas (2002)
- The Best of Ecossaise (2003)
- Grandezza (2003)
- Ocean of Dreams (2006)
- Coming to America (2008)
- Ian Mulder in Concert (2009)
- Ian Mulder's favourite Hymns (2010)
- The Piano Dreamer (2011)
- Sounds of Silence (2012)
- Love Divine (2013)
- Christmas (2014)
- Love Divine II (2015)
- Love Divine III (2016)
- Love Divine IV (2017)
- Love Divine V (2018)
- Ocean of Dreams 2 (2018)
- Love Divine VI (2019)
- Love Divine VII (2021)
- One Hand, One Heart (2024)
- The Calm Collection (2025)
- Hymns by Candlelight (2025)
- Christmas by Candlelight (2026)

== DVDs ==
- Ian Mulder in Concert (2009)
