= Dolnji Zemon =

- Location in Slovenia
- Coordinates: 45°32′48.88″N 14°15′34.44″E
- Country: Slovenia
- Traditional region: Inner Carniola
- Statistical region: Littoral–Inner Carniola
- Municipality: Ilirska Bistrica

Area
  - Total: 5.35 km^{2} (2.07 sq mi)
- Elevation: 449.2 m (1,474 ft)

Population (2002)
  - Total: 457

Dolnji Zemon (pronounced [ˈdoːlnji ˈzeːmɔn]; in older sources: Dolenji Zemon, German: Untersemon, Italian: Zemon di Sotto) is a small settlement on the left bank of the Reka River south of Ilirska Bistrica in the Inner Carniola region of Slovenia. It includes the hamlet of Zemonska Vaga.

== Geography ==
Dolnji Zemon is a clustered village at the foot of Javor Hill (481 meters or 1,578 feet), which rises steeply above the Reka River and transitions into the Žabovica Plain to the northwest. The village is accessible by a secondary road from Ilirska Bistrica via Zemonska Vaga to the west, and also by a road branching off the main road from Ilirska Bistrica to Zabiče. The soil is mostly loamy, and the village is surrounded by tilled fields, meadows, and pastures.

== Name ==
The name Dolnji Zemon means 'lower Zemon', distinguishing the settlement from neighboring Gornji Zemon (literally, 'upper Zemon'). The village was attested in written records in 1498 as Semel. Like similar Slovene and other Slavic toponyms (e.g., Zemono, Zemun, Zemplín, etc.), the name is a deadjectival noun derived from Slavic *zemľьnъ 'earthen', referring to an earthwork fortification.

== History ==
Early settlement of the area is attested by pre-Roman and Roman-era finds southeast of the village on Gradišče Hill (480 meters or 1,570 feet). The remnants of a medieval castle stand northeast of the village; its owners included the Marastoni and Oldenburg families in the 17th century. The castle's last owner, at the beginning of the 20th century, was Antonietta Scribani. A water main was installed in Dolnji Zemon in 1938; prior to this drinking water was drawn from three springs in the village, which continued to be used for laundering and watering livestock after the main was installed. During the Second World War, there was an armed engagement between German forces and the Partisans' Gortan Brigade. A sawmill and grain mill operated along the Reka River, but were abandoned after the Second World War.

=== Mass graves ===
Dolnji Zemon is the site of nine mass graves or clandestine graves from the end of the Second World War. They all contain the remains of German soldiers from the 97th Corps that fell at the beginning of May 1945. The Podnjive Mass Grave (Slovene: Grobišče Podnjive) is located in a meadow north of the settlement and contains the remains of several soldiers. The Mlačca Mass Grave (Grobišče Mlačca) is located in a yard and contains the remains of three soldiers. The Primary School Grave (Grobišče pri osnovni šoli) is located in the yard of the former primary school and contains the remains of a senior officer. The Hrib Mass Grave (Grobišče Hrib) is located in an overgrown meadow behind the farm at Dolnji Zemon no. 47 and contains the remains of two soldiers. The Ločica Mass Grave (Grobišče Ločica) is located about 300 m southwest of the settlement and contains the remains of 22 soldiers. The Stajnica Mass Grave (Grobišče Stajnica), also known as the Stojnica Mass Grave (Grobišče Stojnica), is located in a meadow on the edge of a woods south of the settlement and contains the remains of four soldiers. The Zahrib Mass Grave (Grobišče Zahrib) is located in a meadow 300 m south of the settlement and contains the remains of 30 soldiers. The Dula Mass Grave (Grobišče Dula) is located in a meadow next to Lower Creek (Dolenji potok or Dolenjski potok) south of the settlement and contains the remains of eight soldiers. The Lower Creek Mass Grave (Grobišče Dolenji potok) is located on the west side of the road near the bridge over Lower Creek south of the settlement and contains the remains of an unknown number of soldiers.

== Church ==
The small church in the settlement is dedicated to Saint Michael and belongs to the Parish of Ilirska Bistrica.

== Notable people ==
Notable people that were born or lived in Dolnji Zemon include:

- Maksa Samsa (1904–1971), poet
- Avgust Šuligoj (1900–1984), music teacher
