= Gornji Zemon =

- Location in Slovenia
- Coordinates: 45°32′3.98″N 14°16′54.53″E
- Country: Slovenia
- Traditional region: Inner Carniola
- Statistical region: Littoral–Inner Carniola
- Municipality: Ilirska Bistrica

Area
  - Total: 5.24 km^{2} (2.02 sq mi)
- Elevation: 485.9 m (1,594 ft)

Population (2002)
  - Total: 114

Gornji Zemon (pronounced [ˈɡoːɾnji ˈzeːmɔn]; in older sources: Gorenji Zemon, German: Obersemon, Italian: Zemon di Sopra) is a village southeast of Ilirska Bistrica in the Inner Carniola region of Slovenia.

== Name ==
The name Gornji Zemon means 'upper Zemon', distinguishing the settlement from neighboring Dolnji Zemon (literally, 'lower Zemon'). The village was attested in written records in 1498 as Obersemel. Like similar Slovene and other Slavic toponyms (e.g., Zemono, Zemun, Zemplín, etc.), the name is a deadjectival noun derived from Slavic *zemľьnъ 'earthen', referring to an earthwork fortification.

== Mass grave ==
Gornji Zemon is the site of a mass grave from the end of the Second World War. The Krnice Mass Grave (Slovene: Grobišče Krnice) lies in a meadow in the hills south of the village. It contains the remains of 150 German soldiers from the 97th Corps that were shot at the beginning of May 1945.

== Church ==
The local church in the settlement is dedicated to Saint Bartholomew and belongs to the Parish of Ilirska Bistrica.
