= Ptrukša =

Ptrukša Szirénfalva
- Municipality
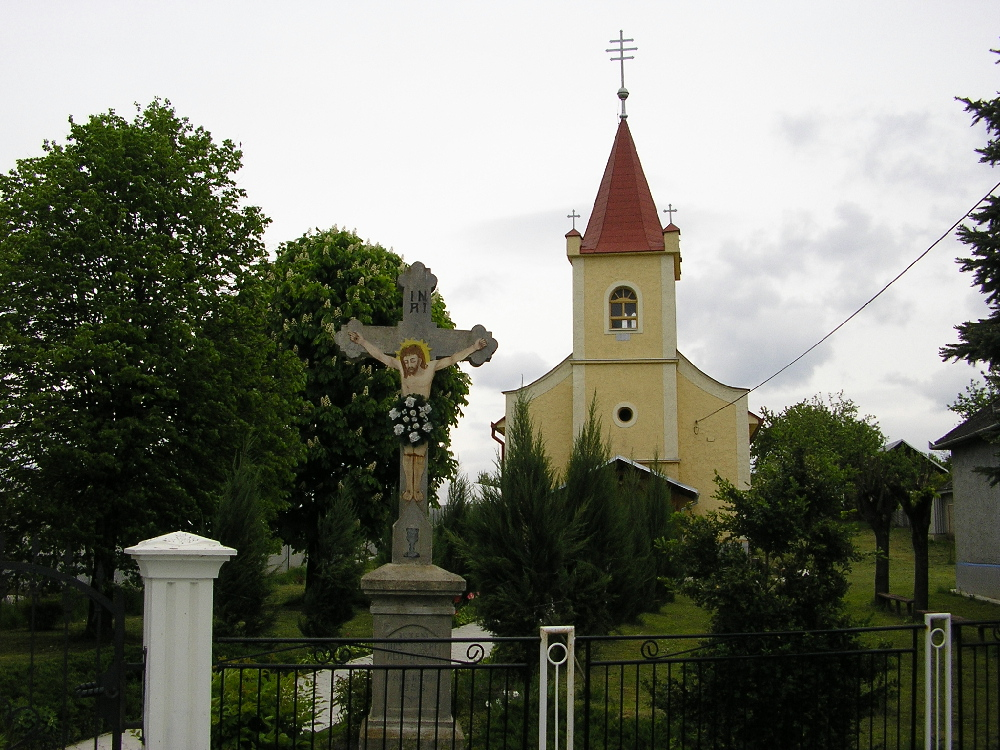

- Flag

- Location of Ptrukša in the Košice Region Location of Ptrukša in Slovakia
- Coordinates: 48.49°N 22.14°E
- Country: Slovakia
- Region: Košice Region
- District: Michalovce District
- First mentioned: 1281

Area
  - Total: 6.93 km^{2} (2.68 sq mi)
- Elevation: 101 m (331 ft)

Population (2025)
  - Total: 455
- Time zone: UTC+1 (CET)
  - Summer (DST): UTC+2 (CEST)
- Postal code: 767 7
- Area code: +421 56
- Vehicle registration plate (until 2022): MI
- Website: www.ptruksa.sk

Ptrukša (Hungarian: Szirénfalva) is a village and municipality in Michalovce District in the Kosice Region of eastern Slovakia.

== History ==
In historical records the village was first mentioned in 1281.

== Geography ==
The municipality lies at an altitude of 101 metres (331 ft) and covers an area of 6.93 km^{2} (2.68 sq mi) (2025).

== Population ==
Population statistic (10 years)
Year	1995	2005	2015	2025
Count	506	519	484	455
Difference		+2.56%	−6.74%	−5.99%

Population statistic
Year	2024	2025
Count	448	455
Difference		+1.56%

It has a population of 455 people (31 December 2025).

=== Ethnicity ===
Census 2021 (1+ %)
Ethnicity	Number	Fraction
Hungarian	423	91.75%
Slovak	51	11.06%
Not found out	13	2.81%
Total	461	

In year 2021 was 461 people by ethnicity 423 as Hungarian, 51 as Slovak, 13 as Not found out, 4 as Ukrainian, 2 as Other and 1 as German.

Note on population: The difference values of population numbers in the table "Population statistic" and in the sections "Ethnicity" & "Religion" is caused by the use of various statistical methods.

=== Religion ===
Census 2021 (1+ %)
Religion	Number	Fraction
Calvinist Church	188	40.78%
Greek Catholic Church	141	30.59%
Roman Catholic Church	101	21.91%
None	14	3.04%
Evangelical Church	6	1.3%
Not found out	5	1.08%
Total	461	

In year 2021 was 461 people by religion 188 from Calvinist Church, 141 from Greek Catholic Church, 101 from Roman Catholic Church, 14 from None, 6 from Evangelical Church, 5 from Not found out, 3 from Eastern Orthodox Church, 1 from Christian Congregations in Slovakia, 1 from Other and 1 from Ad hoc movements.

== Transport ==
Ptrukša lies at the end of the local main road and its bus stops are a terminus for the local regular bus service.

== Tourism ==
The village has a series of two large ponds at its centre, the Pallagcsa ponds, used for recreational boating and fishing.

The village is one of the major starting points for hiking in the Latorica Protected Landscape Area. There is a suspended rope foot-bridge for hikers outside of the village, spanning the Latorica river. The bridge is a part of the local hiking trails alongside the Latorica river and through its alluvial forests and meadows.

== Gallery ==
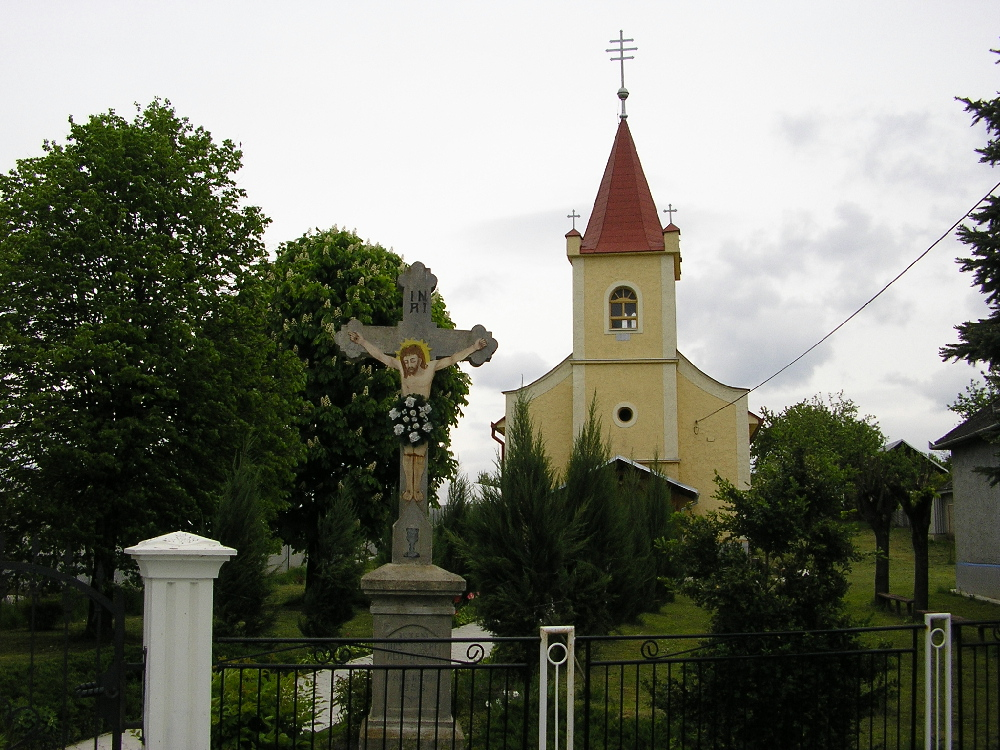
Reformed church in Ptrukša

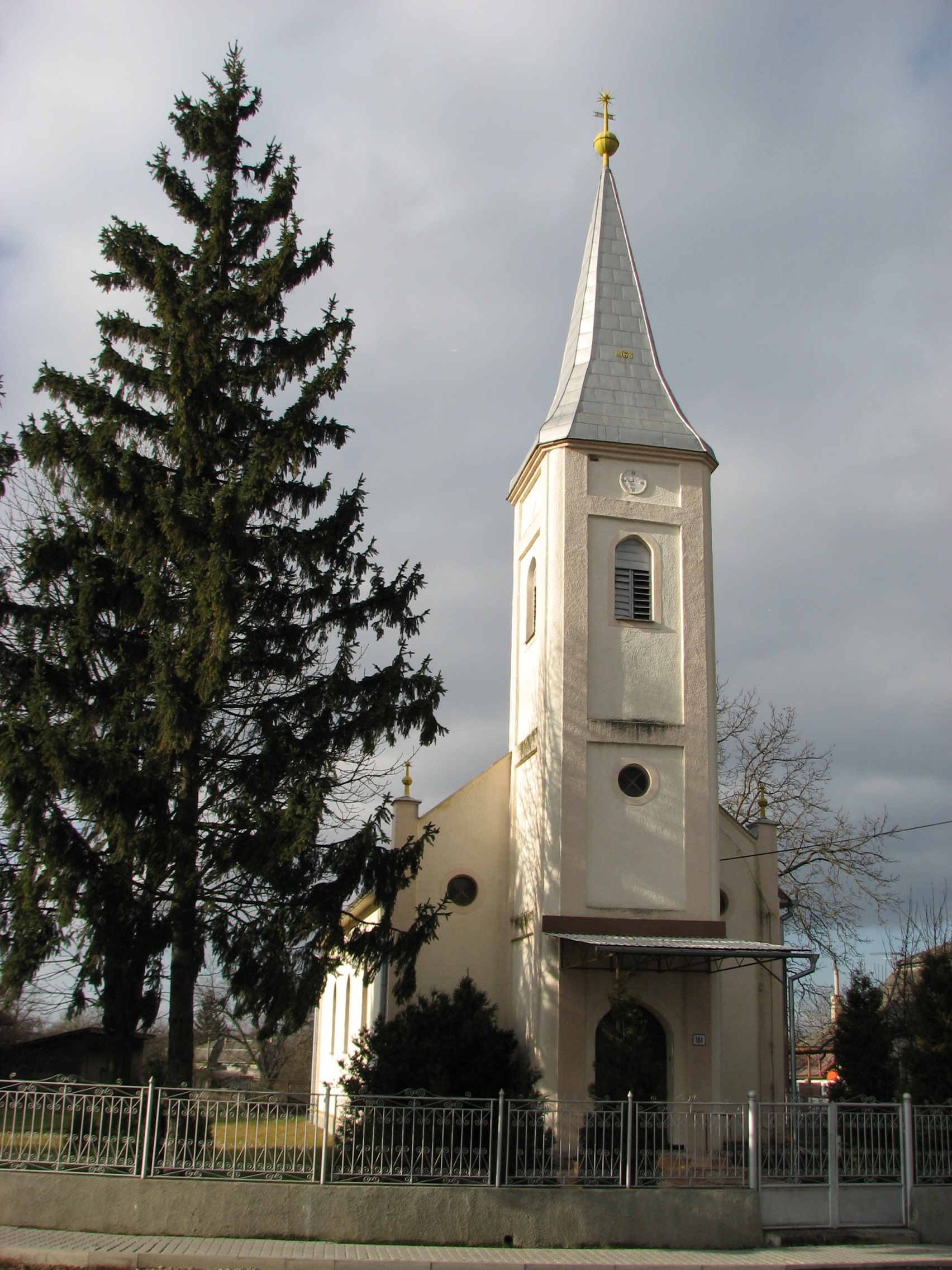
Greek Catholic church in Ptrukša

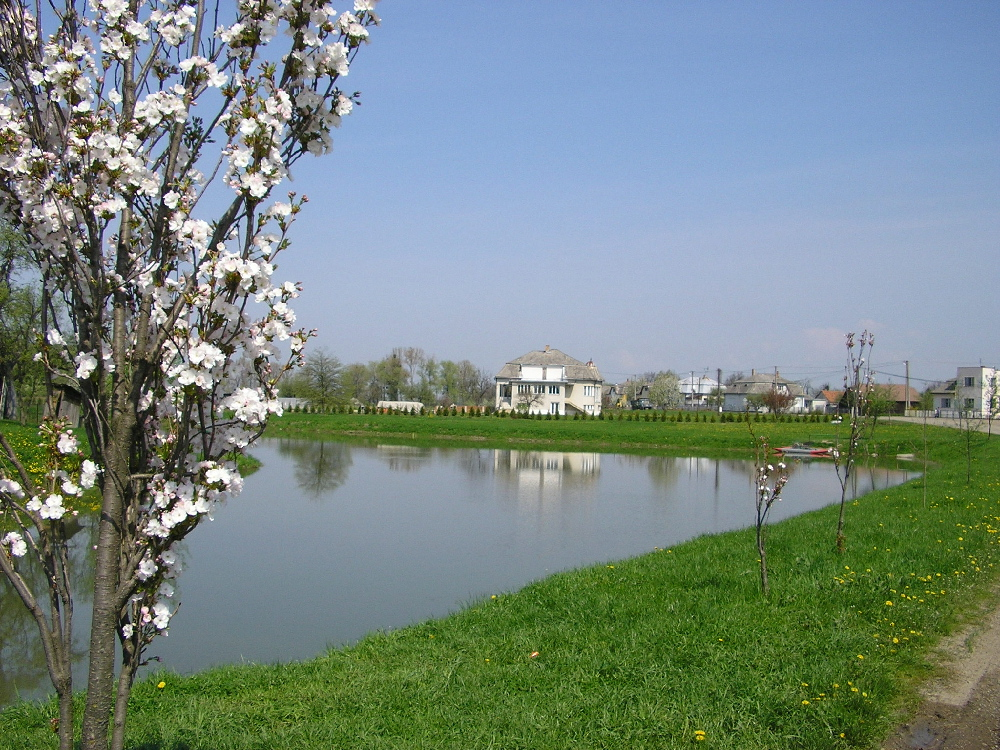
One of the two Pallagcsa ponds in the village during spring time

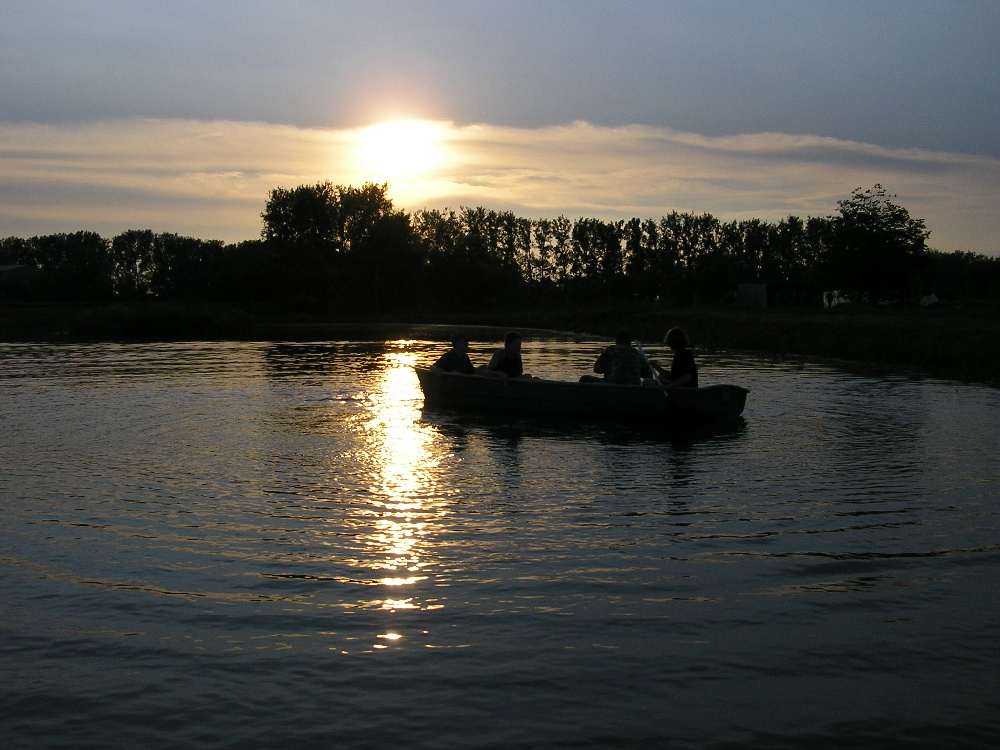
Boating on one of the Pallagcsa ponds

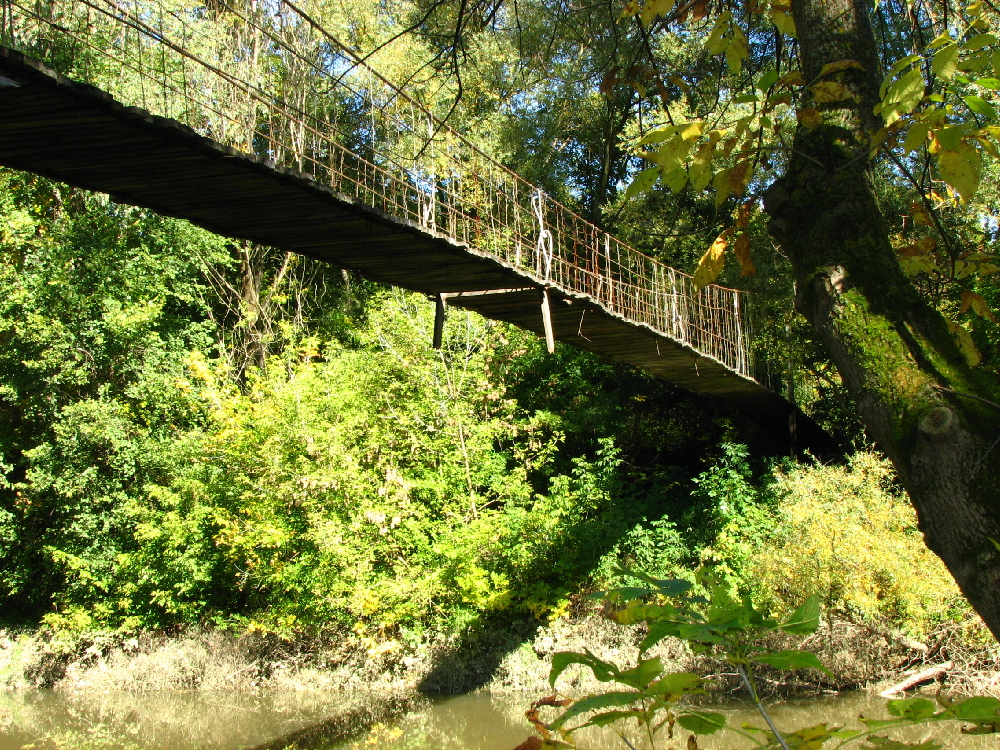
Suspended rope foot-bridge over the Latorica river for hikers in the Latorica Protected Landscape Area

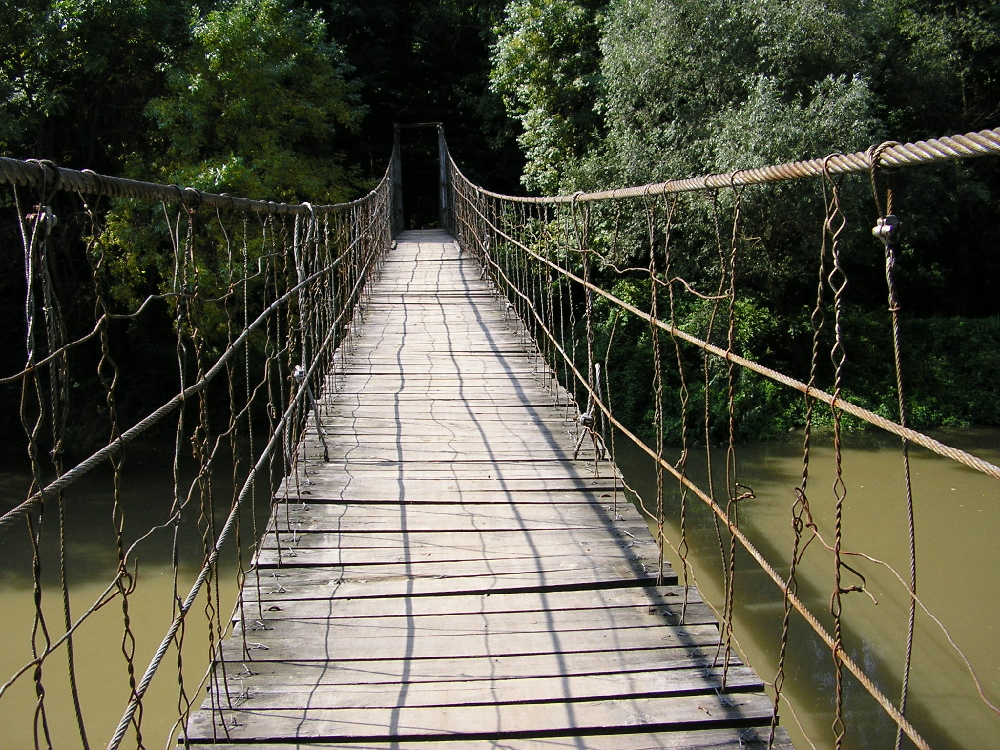
Suspended rope foot-bridge over the Latorica river for hikers in the Latorica Protected Landscape Area

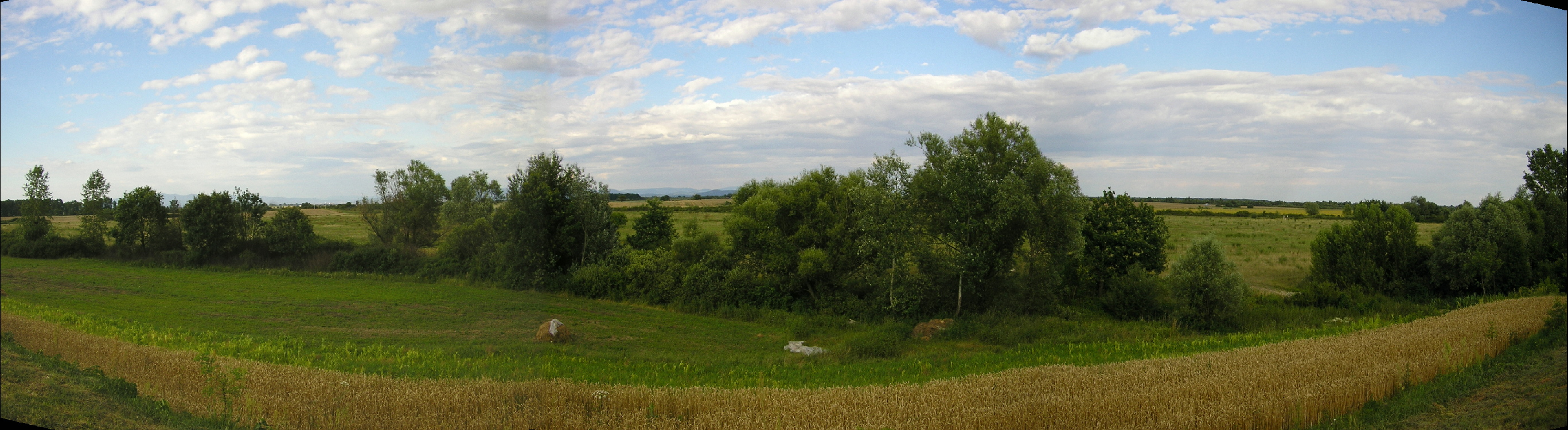
Slovak-Ukrainian border line near Ptrukša
