= Snakov =

- Municipality
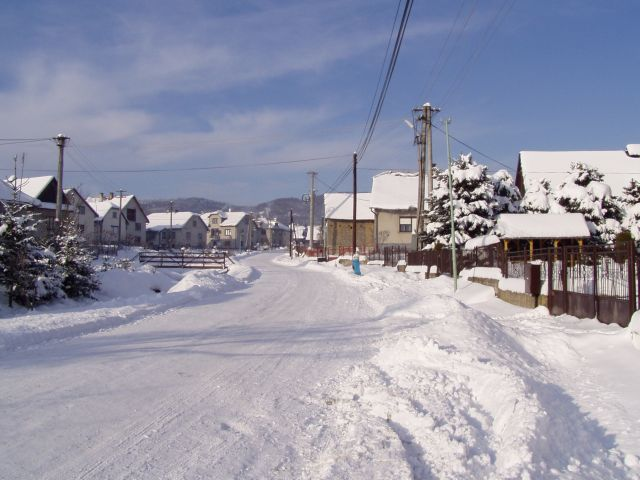

- Flag Coat of arms

- Location of Snakov in the Prešov Region Location of Snakov in Slovakia
- Coordinates: 49.32°N 21.05°E
- Country: Slovakia
- Region: Prešov Region
- District: Bardejov District
- First mentioned: 1543

Area
  - Total: 12.13 km^{2} (4.68 sq mi)
- Elevation: 459 m (1,506 ft)

Population (2025)
  - Total: 668
- Time zone: UTC+1 (CET)
  - Summer (DST): UTC+2 (CEST)
- Postal code: 860 6
- Area code: +421 54
- Vehicle registration plate (until 2022): BJ
- Website: www.snakov.sk

Snakov is a village and municipality in Bardejov District in the Prešov Region of north-east Slovakia.

== History ==
In historical records the village was first mentioned in 1543

== Geography ==
The municipality lies at an altitude of 459 metres (1,506 ft) and covers an area of 12.13 km^{2} (4.68 sq mi) (2025).

In the valley where the source Topľa in its upper reaches, where the main valley ends and forks in the lower valley, near the Polish border, lies the village of Snakov. This village is located in the westernmost part of the Low Beskid, under their principal back, at an altitude of 450 meters. It is located 18 kilometers west of the town Bardejov beside the main road that leads to the Stará Ľubovňa.

Through the village a relatively small stream flows Vesna, which rises near the border with Poland. Vesna is at the crossroads (the "Mlynisko") flows into the Topľa river.

== Population ==
Population statistic (10 years)
| Year | 1995 | 2005 | 2015 | 2025 |
|---|---|---|---|---|
| Count | 597 | 672 | 682 | 668 |
| Difference | | +12.56% | +1.48% | −2.05% |

Population statistic
| Year | 2024 | 2025 |
|---|---|---|
| Count | 654 | 668 |
| Difference | | +2.14% |

It has a population of 668 people (31 December 2025).

=== Ethnicity ===
Census 2021 (1+ %)
| Ethnicity | Number | Fraction |
|---|---|---|
| Slovak | 599 | 88.74% |
| Romani | 213 | 31.55% |
| Rusyn | 144 | 21.33% |
| Not found out | 22 | 3.25% |
| Total | 675 | |

In year 2021 was 675 people by ethnicity 599 as Slovak, 213 as Romani, 144 as Rusyn, 22 as Not found out, 2 as Czech, 2 as Polish and 1 as Ukrainian.

Note on population: The difference values of population numbers in the table "Population statistic" and in the sections "Ethnicity" & "Religion" is caused by the use of various statistical methods.

=== Religion ===
Census 2021 (1+ %)
| Religion | Number | Fraction |
|---|---|---|
| Greek Catholic Church | 599 | 88.74% |
| Roman Catholic Church | 31 | 4.59% |
| None | 21 | 3.11% |
| Not found out | 13 | 1.93% |
| Eastern Orthodox Church | 8 | 1.19% |
| Total | 675 | |

In year 2021 was 675 people by religion 599 from Greek Catholic Church, 31 from Roman Catholic Church, 21 from None, 13 from Not found out, 8 from Eastern Orthodox Church, 2 from Evangelical Church and 1 from Other.
