= Svidník =

- Municipality
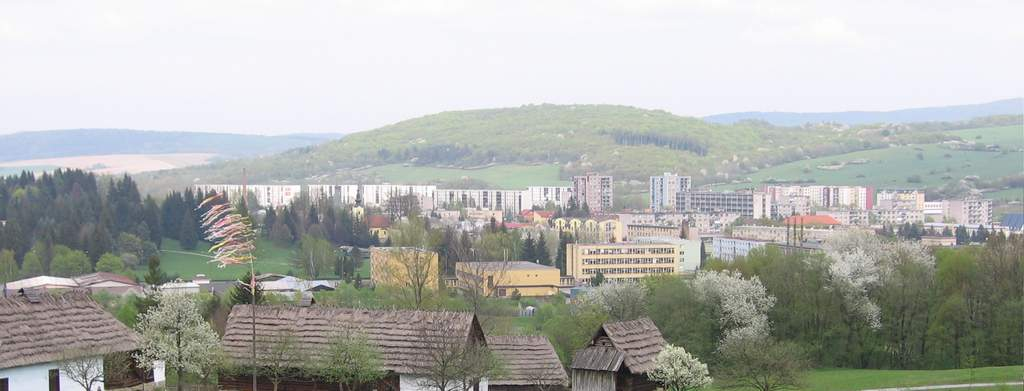
- Panorama of Svidník

- Flag Coat of arms

- Location of Svidník in the Prešov Region Location of Svidník in Slovakia
- Coordinates: 49.31°N 21.57°E
- Country: Slovakia
- Region: Prešov Region
- District: Svidník District
- First mentioned: 1330

Government
  - Mayor: Marcela Ivančová

Area
  - Total: 19.92 km^{2} (7.69 sq mi)
- 2022
- Elevation: 225 m (738 ft)

Population (2025)
  - Total: 9,500

Population by ethnicity (2011)
  - Slovak: 67.2%
  - Rusyn: 19.2%
  - Roma: 3.1%
  - Ukrainian: 2.0%
  - Other: 0.9%
  - Unreported: 7.6%

Population by religion (2011)
  - Greek Catholic: 38.2%
  - Orthodox: 25.4%
  - Roman Catholic: 21.4%
  - Lutheran: 0.9%
  - Jehovah's Witness: 0.4%
  - Other: 0.4%
  - Non-religious: 4.8%
  - Unreported: 8.5%
- Time zone: UTC+1 (CET)
  - Summer (DST): UTC+2 (CEST)
- Postal code: 890 1
- Area code: +421 54
- Vehicle registration plate (until 2022): SK
- Website: www.svidnik.sk

Svidník (Rusyn: Свідник, Ukrainian: Свидник) is a town in north-eastern Slovakia, the capital of the Svidník District in the Prešov Region. It has a population of around 11,000.

There is a monumental Soviet Army Memorial in the city, in memory of Battle of the Dukla Pass.

== Geography ==
The municipality lies at an altitude of 225 metres (738 ft) and covers an area of 19.92 km^{2} (7.69 sq mi) (2025).

It is located in the Ondava Highlands, at the confluence of Ondava and Ladomírka rivers, located around 20 kilometres (12 miles) from the Dukla Pass (Polish border) and around 55 kilometres (34 mi) northeast of Prešov.

== History ==
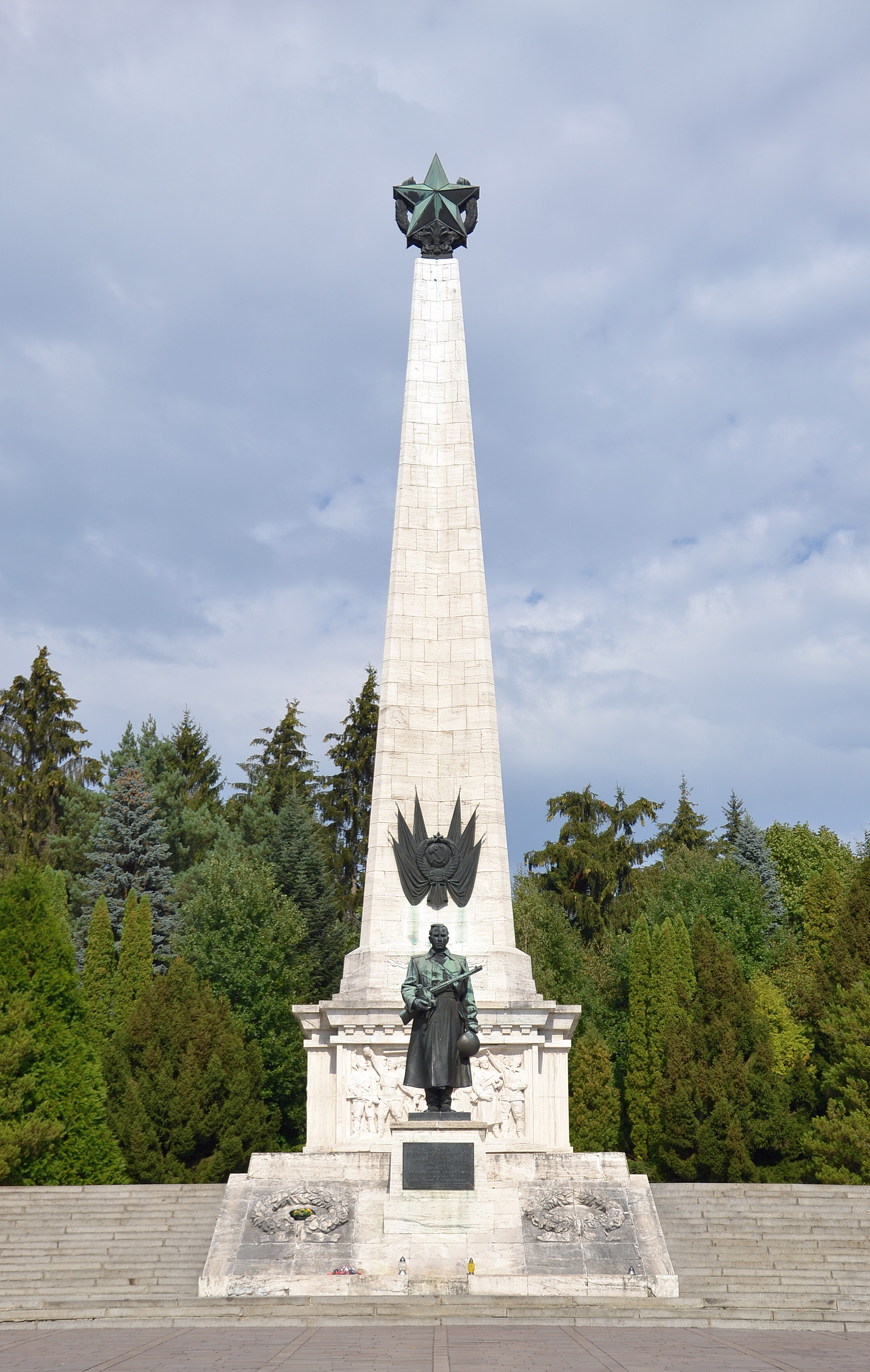
Soviet Army Memorial

The town arose in 1944 by merger of two formerly independent municipalities of Nižný Svidník and Vyšný Svidník. The first written mention stems from 1355 as Scyuidnyk. Before the establishment of independent Czechoslovakia in 1918, Nižný Svidník and Vyšný Svidník were part of Sáros County within the Kingdom of Hungary. From 1939 to 1945, they were part of the Slovak Republic. On 19 January 1945, the Red Army dislodged the Wehrmacht from Svidník in the course of the Western Carpathian offensive and it was once again part of Czechoslovakia.

== Population ==
Historical population
Year	Pop.	±%
1970	3,518	—
1980	7,538	+114.3%
1991	11,520	+52.8%
2001	12,428	+7.9%
2011	11,721	−5.7%
2021	10,168	−13.2%
Source: Censuses

Population statistic (10 years)
Year	1995	2005	2015	2025
Count	12,708	12,384	11,289	9500
Difference		−2.54%	−8.84%	−15.84%

Population statistic
Year	2024	2025
Count	9647	9500
Difference		−1.52%

It has a population of 9500 people (31 December 2025).

=== Ethnicity ===
Census 2021 (1+ %)
Ethnicity	Number	Fraction
Slovak	8264	81.27%
Rusyn	3526	34.67%
Not found out	664	6.53%
Romani	399	3.92%
Ukrainian	214	2.1%
Total	10,168	

In year 2021 was 10,168 people by ethnicity 8264 as Slovak, 3526 as Rusyn, 664 as Not found out, 399 as Romani, 214 as Ukrainian, 45 as Czech, 26 as Other, 18 as Russian, 14 as Hungarian, 13 as Vietnamese, 13 as Polish, 5 as German, 5 as English, 3 as Chinese, 2 as Jewish, 2 as Italian, 2 as Moravian, 1 as Turkish, 1 as Silesian, 1 as Romanian, 1 as Croatian and 1 as Bulgarian.

Note on population: The difference values of population numbers in the table "Population statistic" and in the sections "Ethnicity" & "Religion" is caused by the use of various statistical methods.

=== Religion ===
Census 2021 (1+ %)
Religion	Number	Fraction
Greek Catholic Church	3857	37.93%
Eastern Orthodox Church	2291	22.53%
Roman Catholic Church	2145	21.1%
None	953	9.37%
Not found out	693	6.82%
Total	10,168	

In year 2021 was 10,168 people by religion 3857 from Greek Catholic Church, 2291 from Eastern Orthodox Church, 2145 from Roman Catholic Church, 953 from None, 693 from Not found out, 74 from Evangelical Church, 48 from Jehovah's Witnesses, 26 from Other, 18 from Ad hoc movements, 10 from Paganism and natural spirituality, 10 from Other and not ascertained christian church, 10 from Christian Congregations in Slovakia, 9 from Church of the Brethren, 8 from Calvinist Church, 7 from Buddhism, 3 from Apostolic Church, 2 from Islam, 1 from Jewish community, 1 from Hinduism, 1 from United Methodist Church and 1 from Church of Jesus Christ of Latter-day Saints.

== Twin towns — sister cities ==
Svidník is twinned with:

- Strzyżów, Poland
- Świdnik, Poland
- Jarosław, Poland
- Sanok County, Poland
- Chrudim, Czech Republic
- Kriva Palanka, North Macedonia
- Rakhiv, Ukraine
- Vrbas, Serbia
