= Kéthely =

Kéthely Kitlja (in Croatian)
- Village
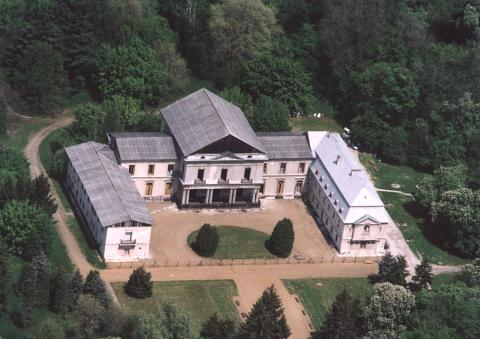
- Hunyady mansion aerial photography

- Coat of arms

- Location of Somogy county in Hungary

- Location of Kéthely
- Coordinates: 46.64605°N 17.39402°E
- Country: Hungary
- Region: Southern Transdanubia
- County: Somogy
- District: Marcali
- RC Diocese: Kaposvár

Area
  - Total: 49.06 km^{2} (18.94 sq mi)

Population (2017)
  - Total: 2,303
  - Density: 46.94/km^{2} (121.6/sq mi)
- Demonym: kéthelyi
- Time zone: UTC+1 (CET)
  - Summer (DST): UTC+2 (CEST)
- Postal code: 8713
- Area code: (+36) 85
- NUTS 3 code: HU232
- MP: József Attila Móring (KDNP)
- Website: Kéthely Online

Kéthely (Croatian: Kitlja) is a village in Somogy County, Hungary.

The settlement is part of the Balatonboglár wine region.

== Etymology ==
According to local legends the settlement got its name when the two villages Magyari and Sári united. But it is absolutely false because it was first mentioned between 1332 and 1337 as Kedhely (English: Tuesday place). It could be one of those settlements which got their name after their weekly markets (e.g. Szombathely, Szerdahely).

== History ==
According to László Szita the settlement was completely Hungarian in the 18th century.

== Gallery ==
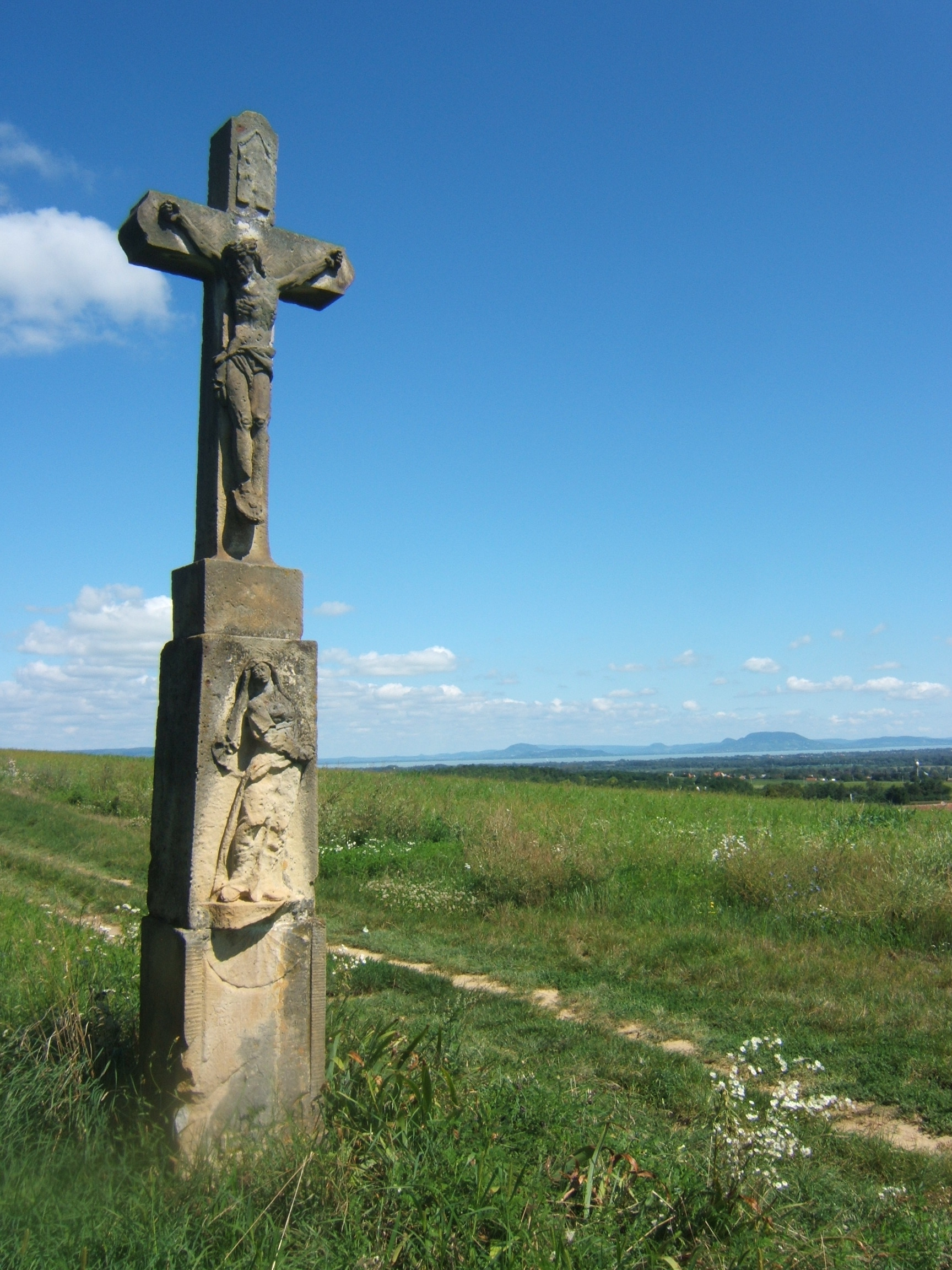
Stonecross from 1813 on the vineyard

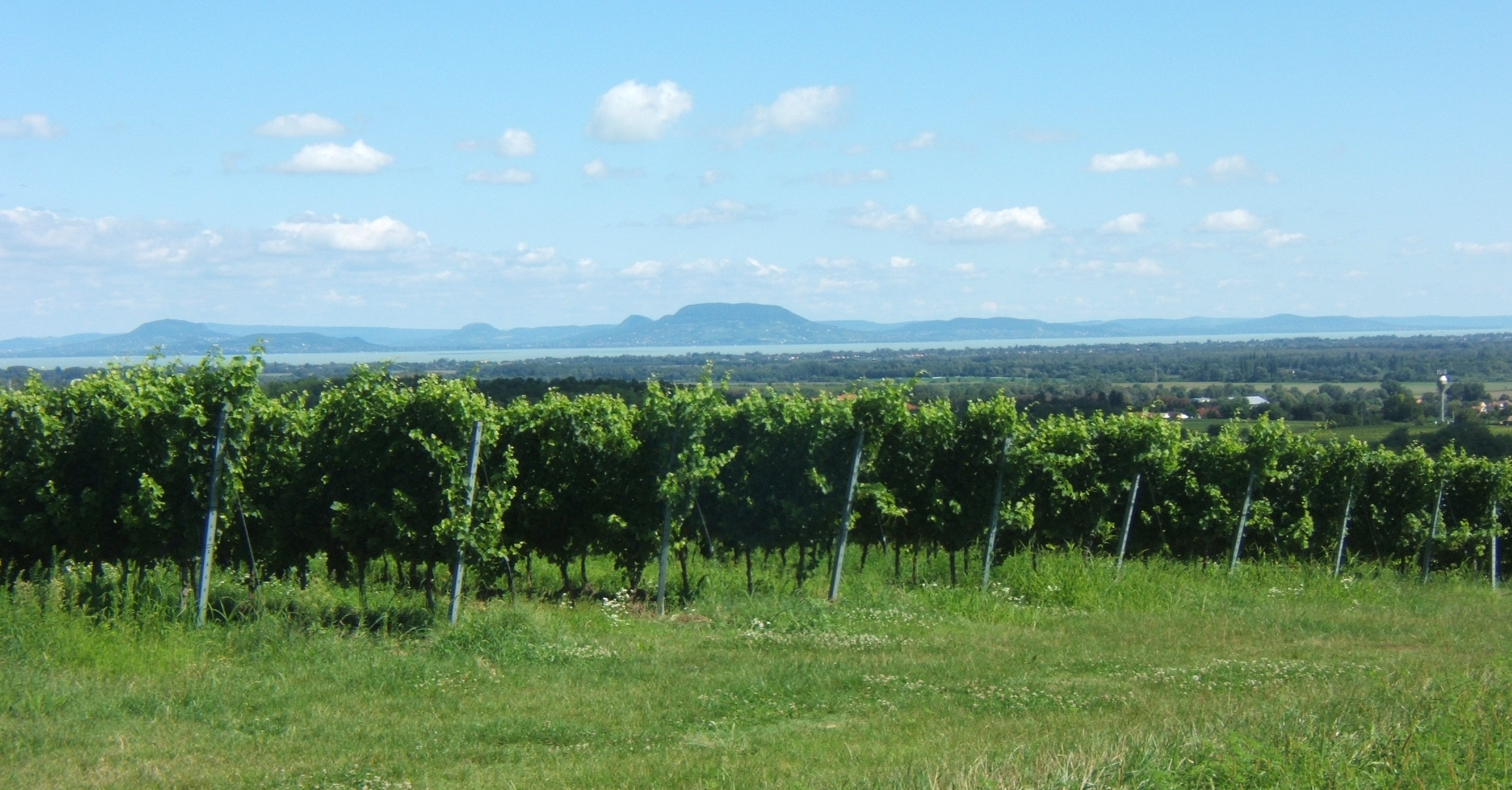
The vineyard of Kéthely

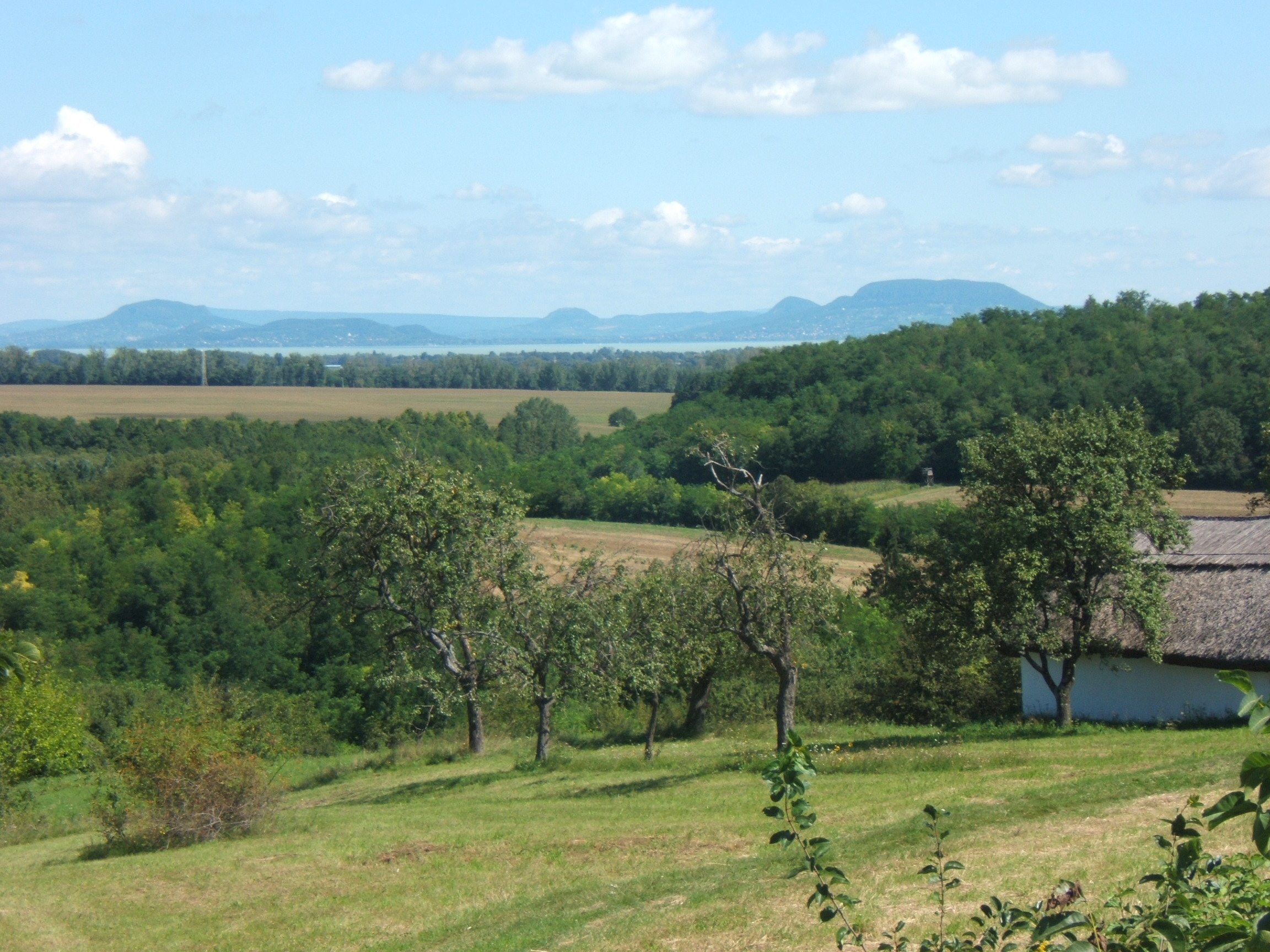
Panorama from the vinehill

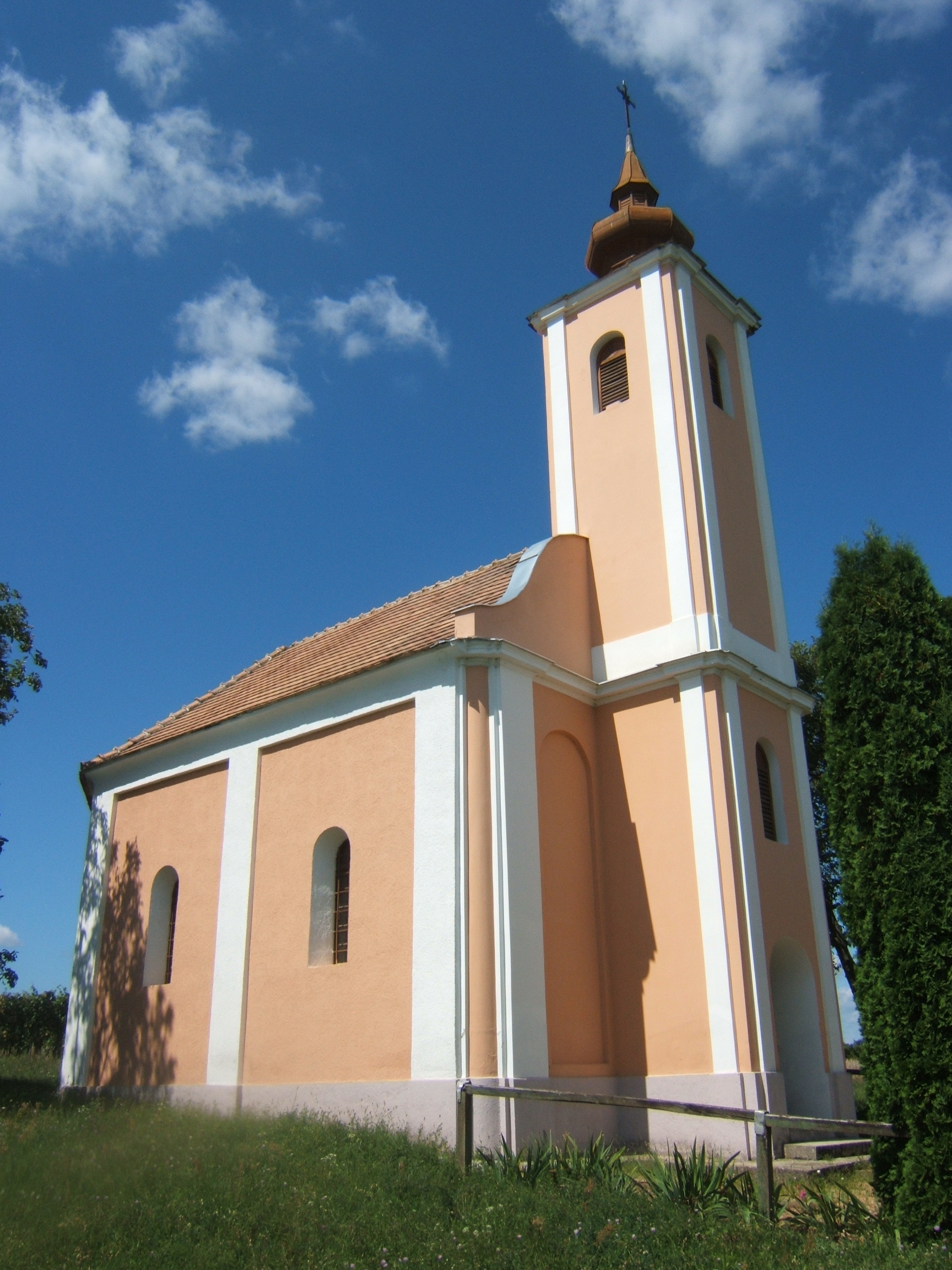
Chapel on the vinehill

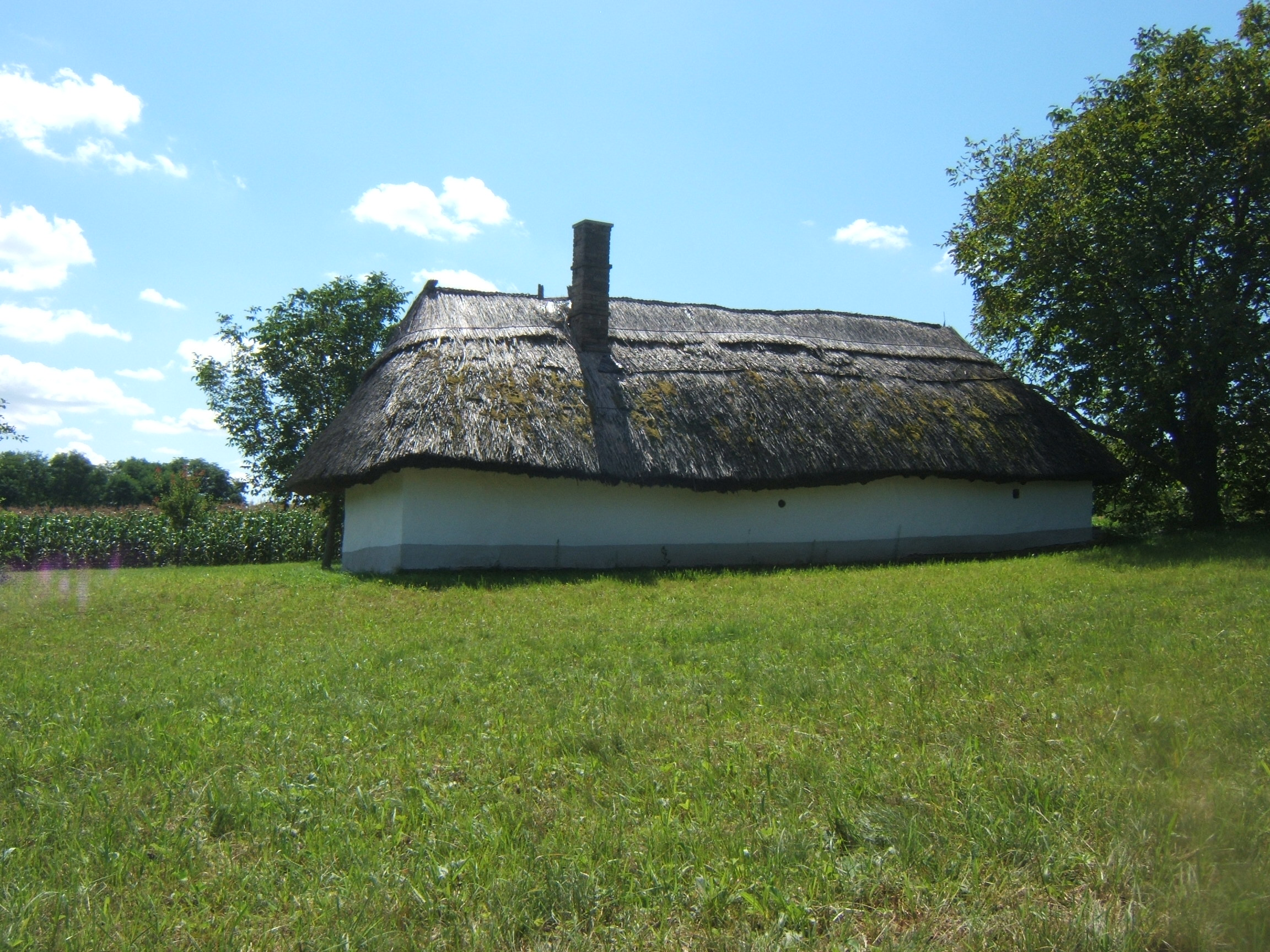
Old press-house on the vinehill

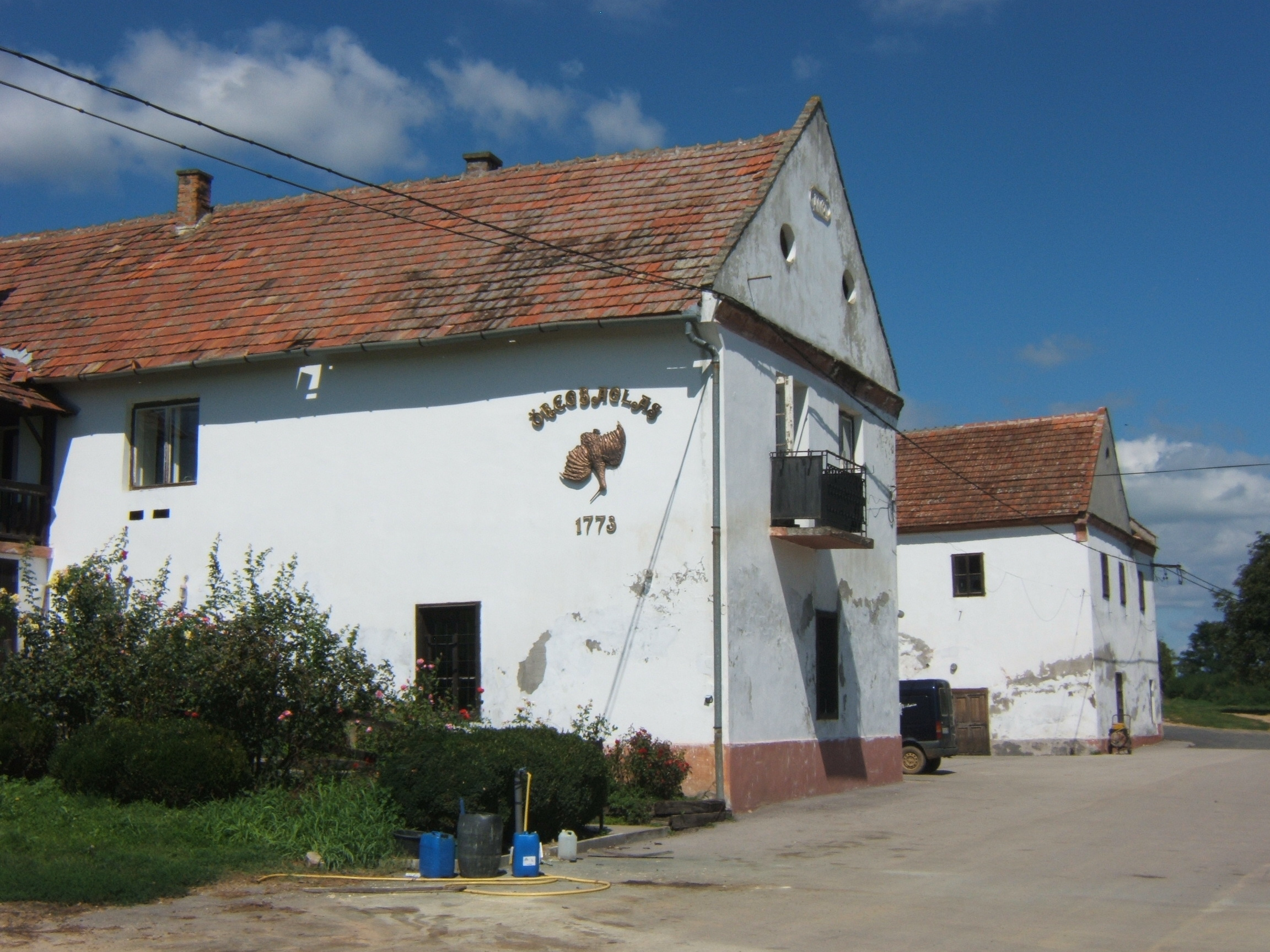
Cellar of Hunyady
