= Zemplín Castle =

Historic site in Zemplín, Slovakia

Zemplín Castle (Slovak: Zemplínsky hrad; Hungarian: Zempléni vár) was a former stronghold, administrative center, and later private residence near the River Bodrog in the village of Zemplín, Trebišov District, Košice Region in eastern Slovakia.

== Etymology ==
The name of the castle is derived from Slavic zem ('soil' or 'earth'). Zemnen in the meaning zemný hrad (literally 'the earth castle', earthwork) was still recorded in the early 14th century. The original Slavic form has been preserved in the local Slovak and Ruthenian dialects as Zemno, Zemné resp. Žemno, Žemňe along with the official name until the 19th, rarely until the 20th century. The official Slovak name Zemplín has been influenced by the Hungarian language and medieval transcription into Latin.

== History ==
The location was first occupied by farmers of the Bükk culture (5000 BC). After settlements of the Baden culture, the Nyírség-Zatín culture and the Gáva culture, Zemplín become the local center of mixed Celtic-Dacian population in the Medzibodrožie region with the largest boom in the 1st century BC. A small hill fort stood at the place of the later castle. In the 1st century CE, the hill fort lost its function until the arrival of the Slavs. Probably in the last third of the 9th century, the Slavs built the hill fort at the same place. The Slavs reused older walls, extended them and strengthened with a wooden construction. The Great Moravian hill fort was surrounded by additional settlements.

The presence of the Hungarians is documented already in the turnover of the 9th and 10th century. The grave of a Hungarian chieftain in the oak coffin, dressed in luxury clothing with exclusive gifts and weapons was attributed to Álmos by Hungarian archeologist Nándor Fettich. The Slavic hill fort is mentioned in Gesta Hungarorum, describing how legendary chieftain of the Hung (Uzhhorod) castle fled "ad castrum Zemlun". The continuity of the population has been preserved also after the fall of Great Moravia and the Slavic settlement of the hill fort is documented between the 9th and the 12th century. Neighbouring Slavic settlements were preserved as well and later become a market village and then a small medieval town Zemplín. The castle was incorporated into the early administrative structure of the Kingdom of Hungary. Between the 11th and the 13th century, the hill fort (the castle) was owned by Hungarian kings and later by several noble families. As an important strategic point, it became the center of the comitatus and the seat of ispán. A romanesque church dedicated to St. George was built probably between the 2nd half of the 11th and the 1st half of the 12th century. In the 13th century, the hill fort was rebuilt to the feudal seat. Around the same time, it was made the administrative center for the Church in the region. The original Slavic inhabitants were slowly assimilated and in the 13th century the population became mostly Hungarian. By the early 14th century the castle was owned by the Drugeth family, followed 250 years later by the Perényi family. During the anti-Habsburg revolts of later centuries the castle was burned and today nothing remains.

Nowadays, the area is a part of the village and is occupied by two churches (Greek-Catholic built 1804 and Evangelical rebuilt in 1628) and the modern cemetery.

== Sources ==
- Turčan, Vladimír (2012). Veľkomoravské hradiská [The Great Moravian Castles] (in Slovak). Bratislava: Dajama. ISBN 978-80-8136-013-8.
- Uhlár, Vlado (1978). "Zemno - Zemen - Zemplín". Slovenská reč (in Slovak). 43.

== See also ==
- List of castles in Slovakia
