= Hanušovce nad Topľou =

- Municipality
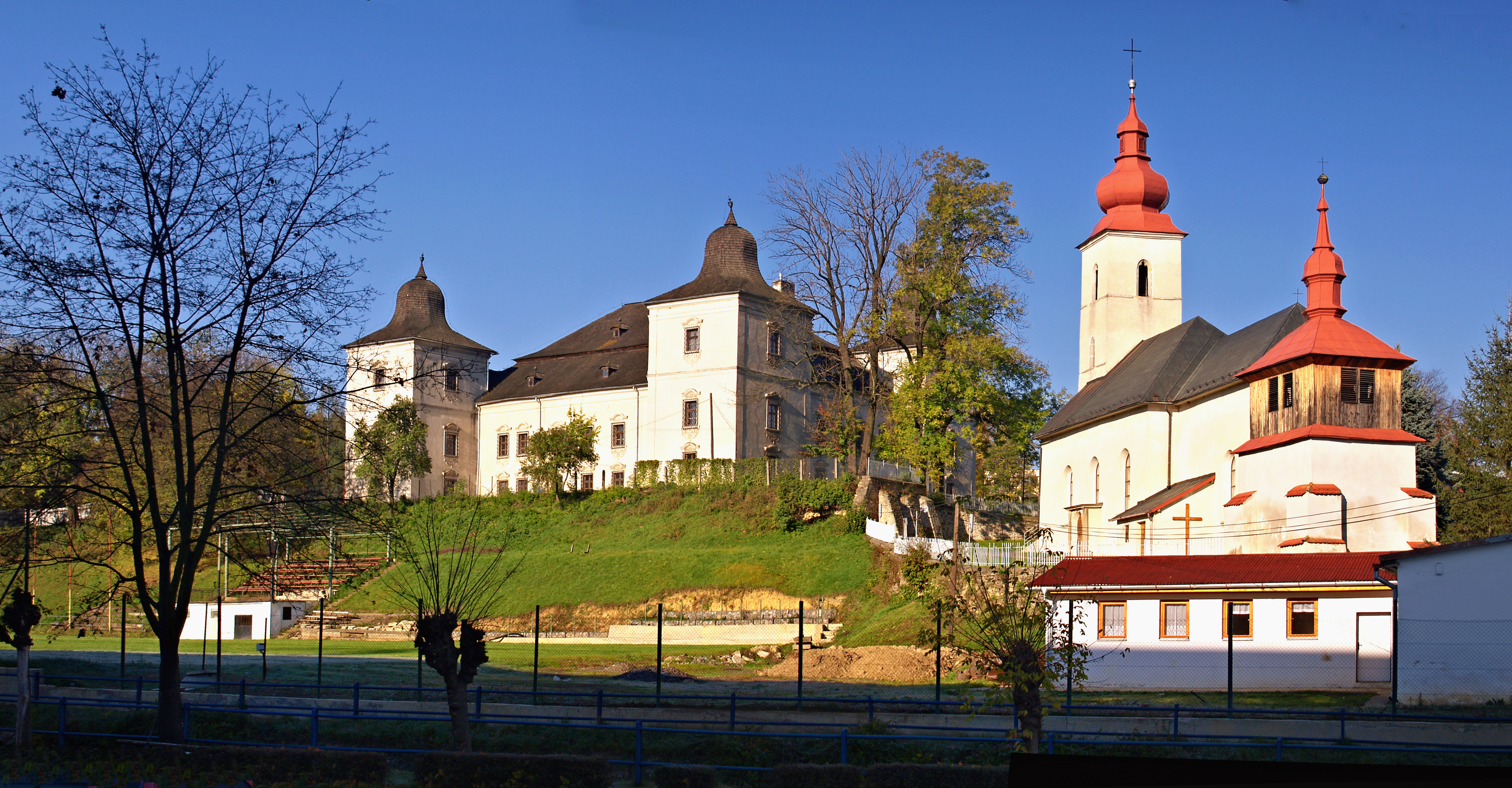
- Museum and Catholic church

- Flag Coat of arms

- Location of Hanušovce nad Topľou in the Prešov Region Location of Hanušovce nad Topľou in Slovakia
- Coordinates: 49.03°N 21.50°E
- Country: Slovakia
- Region: Prešov Region
- District: Vranov nad Topľou District
- First mentioned: 1332

Government
  - Mayor: Štefan Straka

Area
  - Total: 14.25 km^{2} (5.50 sq mi)
- Elevation: 197 m (646 ft)

Population (2025)
  - Total: 3,719
- Time zone: UTC+1 (CET)
  - Summer (DST): UTC+2 (CEST)
- Postal code: 943 1
- Area code: +421 57
- Vehicle registration plate (until 2022): VT
- Website: www.hanusovce.sk

Hanušovce nad Topľou (Hungarian: Tapolyhanusfalva) is a town in the Vranov nad Topľou District, Prešov Region in eastern Slovakia, near the Topľa river.

== Geography ==
The municipality lies at an altitude of 197 metres (646 ft) and covers an area of 14.25 km^{2} (5.50 sq mi) (2025).

== History ==
The first written record about the town was in 1332 under name Hanusa.

== Geography ==
Hanušovce nad Topľou lies at an altitude of 207 metres (679 ft) above sea level and covers an area of 14.973 square kilometres (5.8 sq mi). It is located in the Beskidian Piedmont between the ranges of Slanské vrchy and Ondavská vrchovina, 22 kilometres (14 mi) north-west from the district seat Vranov nad Topľou and 25 kilometres (16 mi) east of Prešov.

== Population ==
Historical population
Year	Pop.	±%
1970	2,219	—
1980	2,502	+12.8%
1991	3,144	+25.7%
2001	3,582	+13.9%
2011	3,741	+4.4%
2021	3,777	+1.0%
Source: Censuses

Population statistic (10 years)
Year	1995	2005	2015	2025
Count	3484	3660	3772	3719
Difference		+5.05%	+3.06%	−1.40%

Population statistic
Year	2024	2025
Count	3728	3719
Difference		−0.24%

It has a population of 3719 people (31 December 2025).

=== Ethnicity ===
Census 2021 (1+ %)
Ethnicity	Number	Fraction
Slovak	3413	90.36%
Romani	662	17.52%
Not found out	310	8.2%
Total	3777	

In year 2021 was 3777 people by ethnicity 3413 as Slovak, 662 as Romani, 310 as Not found out, 29 as Rusyn, 10 as Czech, 7 as Ukrainian, 5 as Hungarian, 4 as French, 2 as Vietnamese, 2 as Russian, 2 as Austrian, 1 as German, 1 as Canadian, 1 as Other and 1 as English.

Note on population: The difference values of population numbers in the table "Population statistic" and in the sections "Ethnicity" & "Religion" is caused by the use of various statistical methods.

=== Religion ===
Census 2021 (1+ %)
Religion	Number	Fraction
Roman Catholic Church	1975	52.29%
Evangelical Church	1158	30.66%
Not found out	242	6.41%
Greek Catholic Church	187	4.95%
None	125	3.31%
Total	3777	

In year 2021 was 3777 people by religion 1975 from Roman Catholic Church, 1158 from Evangelical Church, 242 from Not found out, 187 from Greek Catholic Church, 125 from None, 19 from Other and not ascertained christian church, 16 from Eastern Orthodox Church, 14 from Jehovah's Witnesses, 10 from Apostolic Church, 8 from Church of the Brethren, 5 from Seventh-day Adventist Church, 4 from Christian Congregations in Slovakia, 3 from Calvinist Church, 3 from Ad hoc movements, 2 from Paganism and natural spirituality, 2 from Other, 2 from United Methodist Church, 1 from Old Catholic Church and 1 from Hinduism.

== Twin towns — sister cities ==
Hanušovce nad Topľou is twinned with:

- Dębica, Poland
- Nozdrzec, Poland
- Velká Bíteš, Czech Republic

== See also ==
- List of municipalities and towns in Slovakia

== Genealogical resources ==
The records for genealogical research are available at the state archive (Státný Archiv) in Prešov, Slovakia

- Roman Catholic church records (births/marriages/deaths): 1853-1910 (parish A)
- Greek Catholic church records (births/marriages/deaths): 1847-1939 (parish B)
- Lutheran church records (births/marriages/deaths): 1810-1896 (parish A)
