= Livovská Huta =

- Municipality
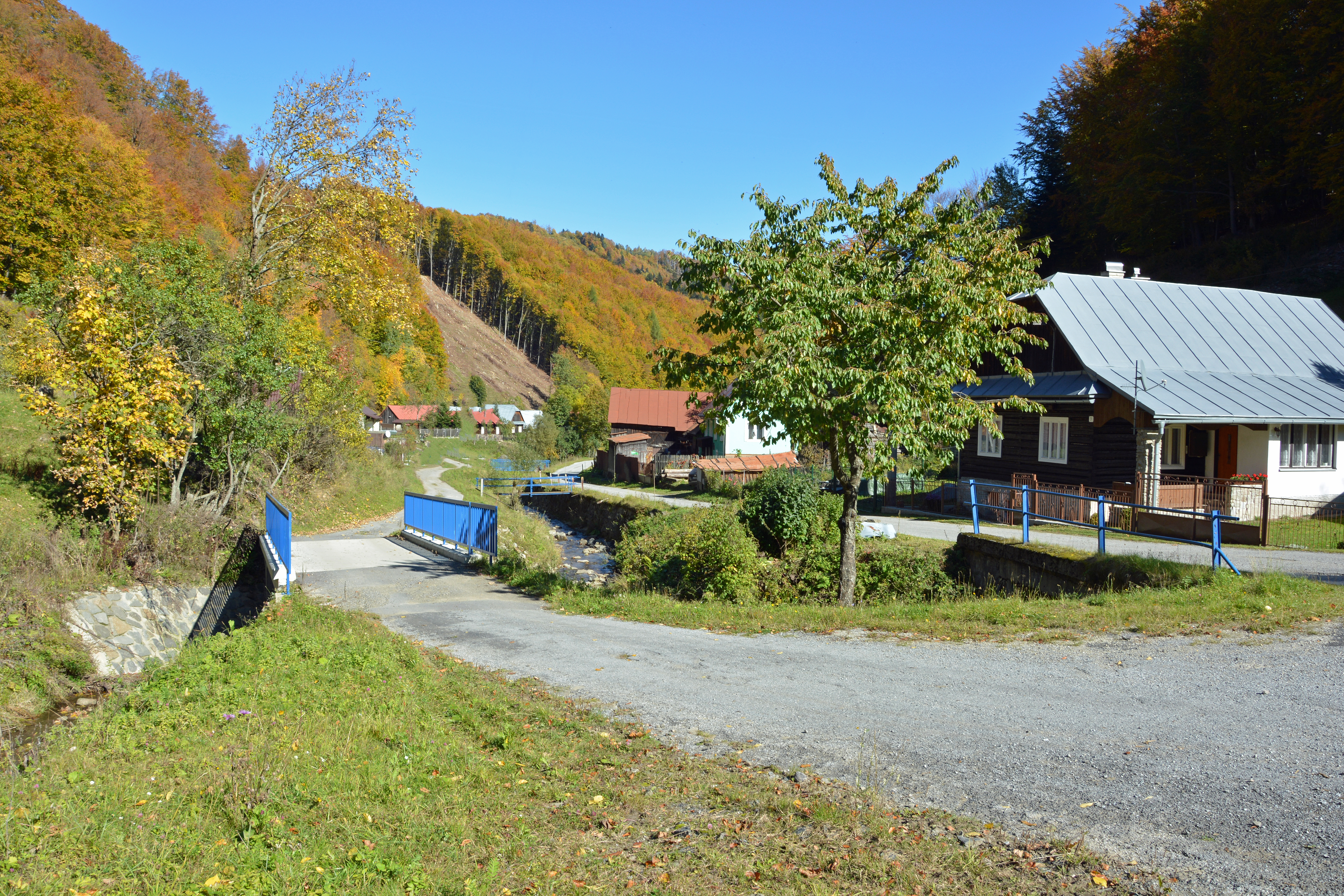

- Flag Coat of arms

- Location of Livovská Huta in the Prešov Region Location of Livovská Huta in Slovakia
- Coordinates: 49.24°N 21.03°E
- Country: Slovakia
- Region: Prešov Region
- District: Bardejov District
- First mentioned: 1773

Area
  - Total: 14.22 km^{2} (5.49 sq mi)
- Elevation: 653 m (2,142 ft)

Population (2025)
  - Total: 35
- Time zone: UTC+1 (CET)
  - Summer (DST): UTC+2 (CEST)
- Postal code: 860 5
- Area code: +421 54
- Vehicle registration plate (until 2022): BJ

Livovská Huta (Rusyn: Лївовска Гута) is a village and municipality in Bardejov District in the Prešov Region of north-east Slovakia.

== History ==
In historical records the village was first mentioned in 1773. The "huta" in its name refers to a glass factory that was once located there.

== Geography ==
The municipality lies at an altitude of 653 metres (2,142 ft) and covers an area of 14.22 km^{2} (5.49 sq mi) (2025). It is 18.5 km (11.5 mi) southwest of Bardejov. It is at the headwaters of the Topľa River.

== Population ==
Population statistic (10 years)
Year	1995	2005	2015	2025
Count	59	54	49	35
Difference		−8.47%	−9.25%	−28.57%

Population statistic
Year	2024	2025
Count	37	35
Difference		−5.40%

It has a population of 35 people (31 December 2025).

=== Ethnicity ===
Census 2021 (1+ %)
Ethnicity	Number	Fraction
Slovak	41	91.11%
Rusyn	16	35.55%
Not found out	1	2.22%
English	1	2.22%
Total	45	

In year 2021 was 45 people by ethnicity 41 as Slovak, 16 as Rusyn, 1 as Not found out and 1 as English.

Note on population: The difference values of population numbers in the table "Population statistic" and in the sections "Ethnicity" & "Religion" is caused by the use of various statistical methods.

=== Religion ===
Census 2021 (1+ %)
Religion	Number	Fraction
Greek Catholic Church	39	86.67%
Evangelical Church	3	6.67%
Roman Catholic Church	1	2.22%
Eastern Orthodox Church	1	2.22%
None	1	2.22%
Total	45	

In year 2021 was 45 people by religion 39 from Greek Catholic Church, 3 from Evangelical Church, 1 from Roman Catholic Church, 1 from Eastern Orthodox Church and 1 from None.
