= Latorica =

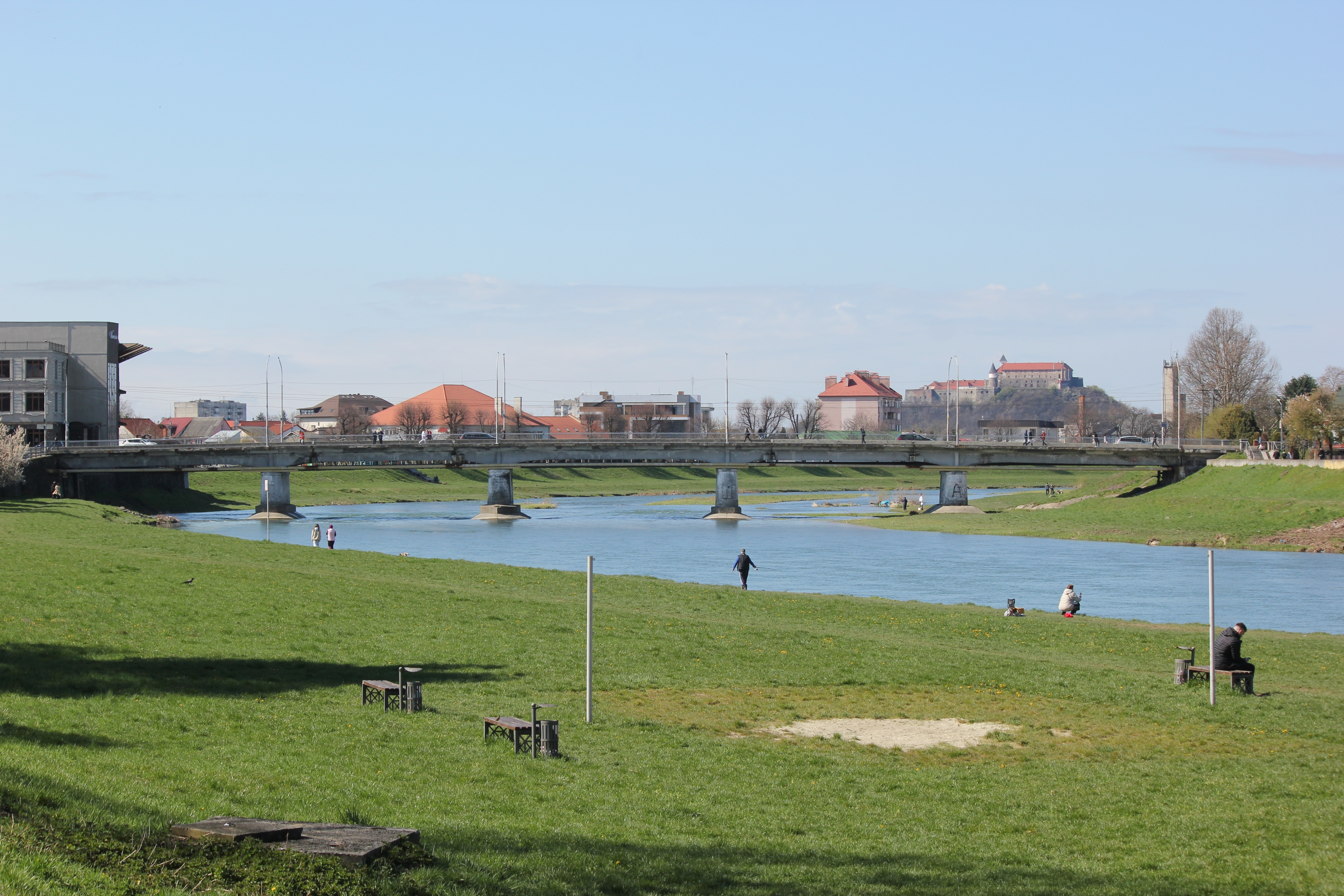
- Latorica river in Mukachevo

Location
- Country: Ukraine, Slovakia

Physical characteristics
- Source: Wooded Carpathians
  - location: Ukraine
  - coordinates: 48.848°N 23.1298°E
  - elevation: 850 m (2,790 ft)
- Mouth
  - location: Bodrog
  - coordinates: 48.4547°N 21.8195°E
- Length: 188 km (117 mi)
- Basin size: 7,740 km^{2} (2,990 sq mi)
- Discharge
  - average: 37 m^{3}/s (1,300 cu ft/s) in Chop

Basin features
- Progression: Bodrog→ Tisza→ Danube→ Black Sea
- Tributaries
  - right: Laborec

Ramsar Wetland
- Designated: 26 May 1993
- Reference no.: 606

Latorica (Hungarian: Latorca; Slovak: Latorica; Ukrainian: Латориця, romanized: Latorytsia) is a river in the watershed of the Danube. Its source is in the Ukrainian Carpathians (Eastern Carpathian Mountains), near the village Latirka. It flows from Ukraine (156.6 km) to Slovakia (31.4 km), 188 km in total and west through the towns of Svaliava, Mukachevo, Solomonovo, Chop and Veľké Kapušany. Its basin size is 7,740 km^{2} (2,990 sq mi). Its confluence with the Ondava, in Zemplín, gives rise to the Bodrog river, itself a tributary of the Tisza.

A part of its watershed (Latorica Protected Landscape Area, "Ramsar site No. 606", 44.05 km^{2} (17.01 sq mi)) has been added to the Ramsar list of wetlands of international importance since 1993.

== Etymology ==
It is interpreted differently: according to one hypothesis, it is a pre-Slavic noun, according to others it is related to Slavic, based on lat- "cold" (meaning "cold river").
