= Fijaš =

- Municipality
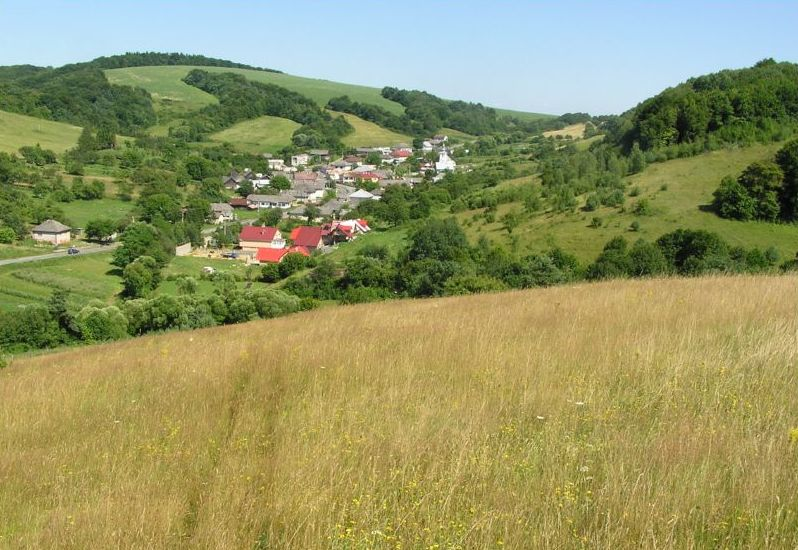

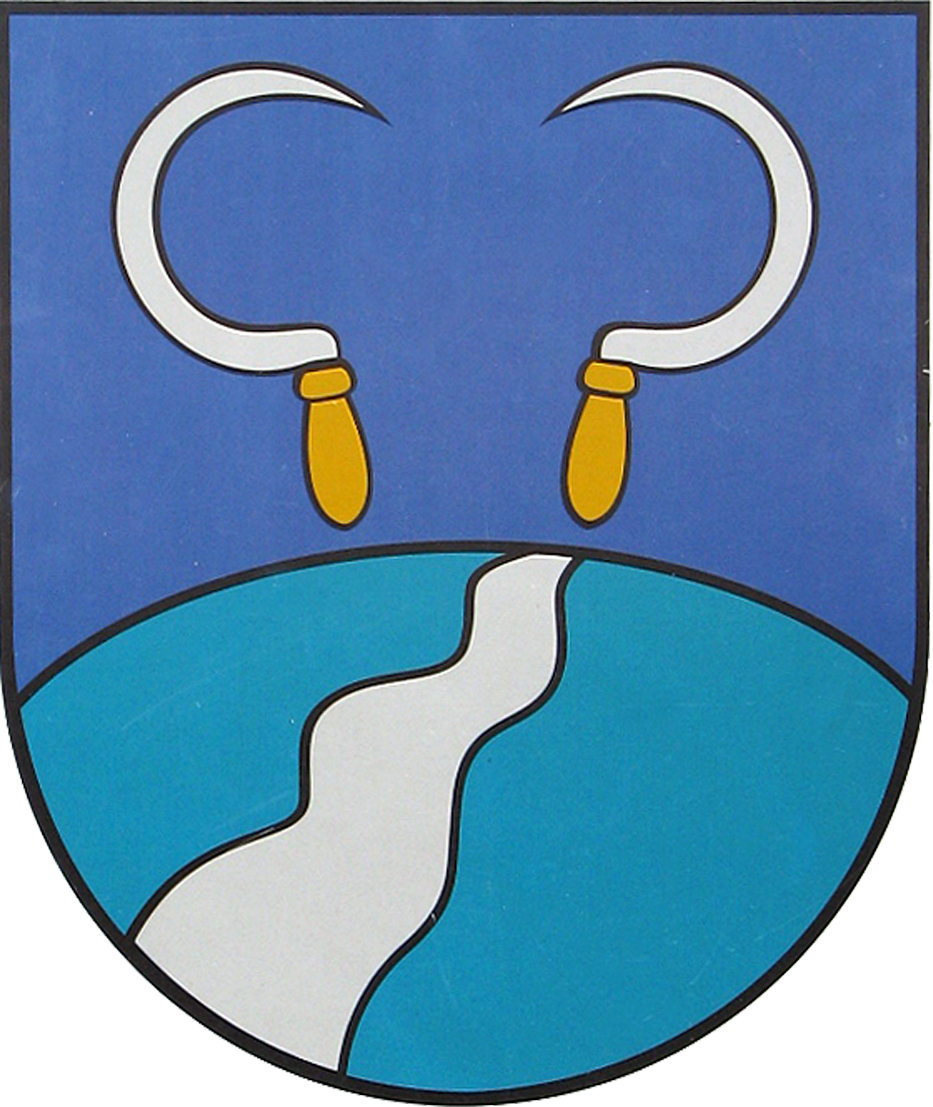
- Flag Coat of arms

- Location of Fijaš in the Prešov Region Location of Fijaš in Slovakia
- Coordinates: 49.13°N 21.58°E
- Country: Slovakia
- Region: Prešov Region
- District: Svidník District
- First mentioned: 1414

Government
  - Mayor: Kristína Fečkaninová (HLAS-SD)

Area
  - Total: 4.40 km^{2} (1.70 sq mi)
- Elevation: 250 m (820 ft)

Population (2025)
  - Total: 138
- Time zone: UTC+1 (CET)
  - Summer (DST): UTC+2 (CEST)
- Postal code: 904 2
- Area code: +421 54
- Vehicle registration plate (until 2022): SK
- Website: www.fijas.dcom.sk

Fijaš (Hungarian: Fias; Rusyn: Фіяш) is a village and municipality in the Svidník District, in the Prešov Region of north-eastern Slovakia.

== History ==
In historical records the village was first mentioned in 1414.

== Geography ==
The municipality lies at an altitude of 250 metres in the Ondavská Highlands, and covers an area of 4.40 km².

== Population ==
Population statistic (10 years)
Year	1995	2005	2015	2025
Count	154	154	147	138
Difference		+0%	−4.54%	−6.12%

Population statistic
Year	2024	2025
Count	138	138
Difference		+1.42%

It has a population of 138 people (31 December 2025).

=== Ethnicity ===
Census 2021 (1+ %)
Ethnicity	Number	Fraction
Slovak	129	88.35%
Rusyn	44	30.13%
Not found out	4	2.73%
Total	146	

In year 2021 was 146 people by ethnicity 129 as Slovak, 44 as Rusyn and 4 as Not found out.

Note on population: The difference values of population numbers in the table "Population statistic" and in the sections "Ethnicity" & "Religion" is caused by the use of various statistical methods.

=== Religion ===
Census 2021 (1+ %)
Religion	Number	Fraction
Greek Catholic Church	112	76.71%
Roman Catholic Church	23	15.75%
Eastern Orthodox Church	4	2.74%
None	4	2.74%
Not found out	2	1.37%
Total	146	

In year 2021 was 146 people by religion 112 from Greek Catholic Church, 23 from Roman Catholic Church, 4 from Eastern Orthodox Church, 4 from None, 2 from Not found out and 1 from Evangelical Church.

== Genealogical resources ==
The records for genealogical research are available at the state archive "Statny Archiv in Presov, Slovakia"

- Roman Catholic church records (births/marriages/deaths): 1775-1895 (parish B)
- Greek Catholic church records (births/marriages/deaths): 1860-1901 (parish B)

== See also ==
- List of municipalities and towns in Slovakia
