= Szerdahely =

Szerdahely may refer to:

- Szerdahely, the Hungarian name of Miercurea Sibiului in Romania
- Dunaszerdahely, the Hungarian name of Dunajská Streda in western Slovakia
- Szerdahely or Bodrogszerdahely, the names of Streda nad Bodrogom in eastern Slovakia
- Szerdahely, a former village, merged in 1898 into the village of Fertőszentmiklós
- Szerdahely or Jakabszerdahely, the medieval Hungarian name for Velike Sredice in Central Croatia
