= Ondava =

Ondava river
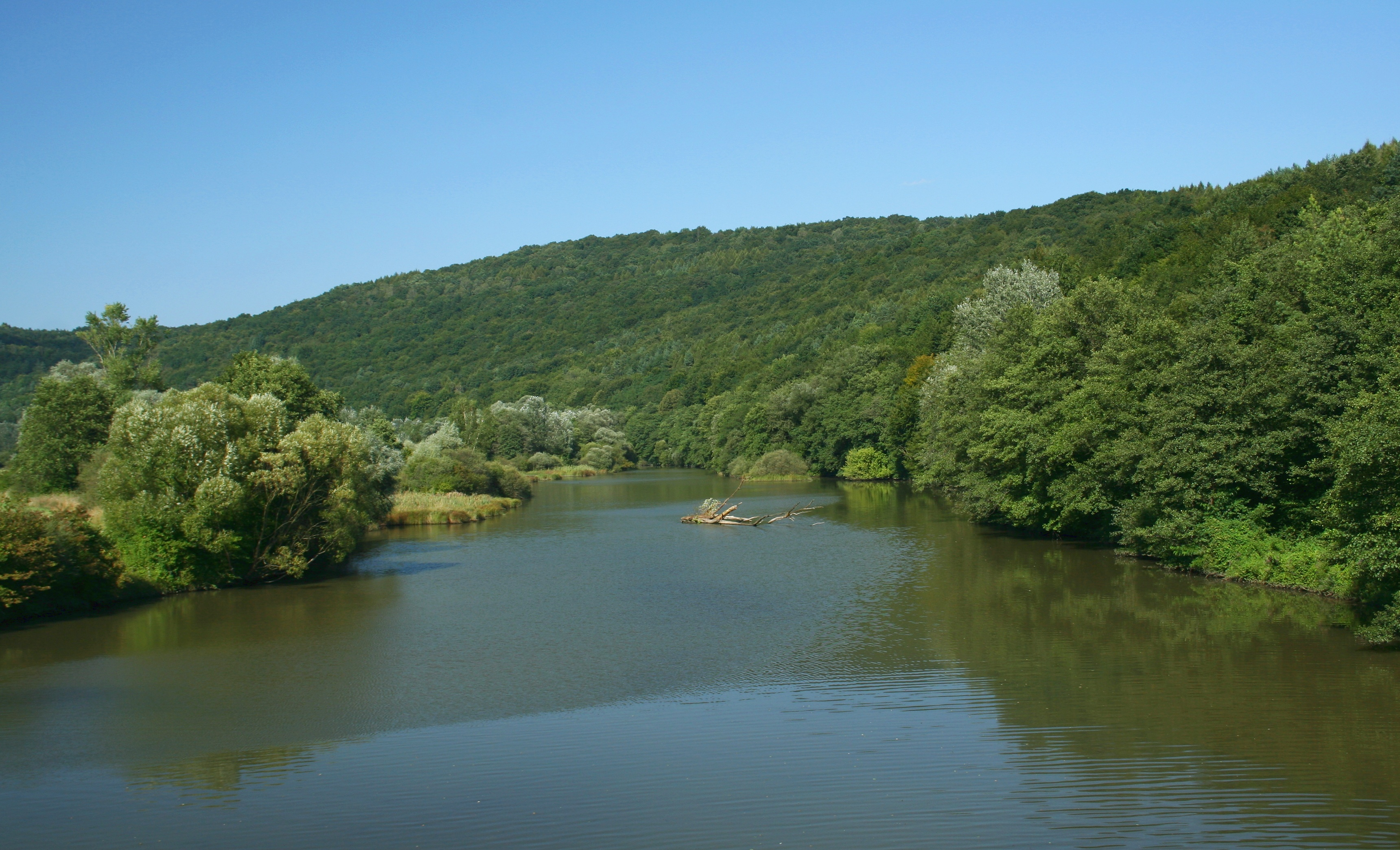
- Ondava

Location
- Country: Slovakia

Physical characteristics
- Source
  - location: Low Beskids
- Mouth
  - location: Joins the Latorica to form the Bodrog
  - coordinates: 48°27′17″N 21°49′10″E
  - elevation: 100 m (330 ft)
- Length: 142 km (88 mi)
- Basin size: 3,355 km^{2} (1,295 sq mi)
- Discharge
  - average: 22.6 m^{3}/s (800 cu ft/s)

Basin features
- Progression: Bodrog→ Tisza→ Danube→ Black Sea
- Tributaries: 444

The Ondava is a river in eastern Slovakia, the northern source river of the Bodrog. Its source is in the Low Beskids (Eastern Carpathian Mountains), near the village Nižná Polianka, close to the border with Poland. The Ondava flows south through the towns of Svidník, Stropkov and Trhovište, and through the Ondavská Highlands. It is 142 km (88 mi) long and its basin size is 3,355 km^{2} (1,295 sq mi).

Near the village Cejkov, the Ondava joins the Latorica and forms the Bodrog river, itself a tributary of the Tisza. The Ondava river is 44% regulated.

== Tributaries ==
- Major left tributaries – Mirošovec, Ladomírka, Chotčianka, Brusnička, Oľka and Ondavka.
- Major right tributary – Topľa.
  - Minor right tributaries – Olšavanka and Trnávka.
