= Latorica Protected Landscape Area =

Protected landscape area of Slovakia

Latorica Protected Landscape Area CHKO Latorica
- IUCN category V (protected landscape/seascape)
- Interactive map of Latorica Protected Landscape Area; CHKO Latorica
- Location: South-eastern Slovakia, Eastern Slovak Lowland
- Coordinates: 48°30′N 21°55′E
- Area: 231.98 km^{2} (89.57 sq mi)
- Established: 25 June 1990
- Governing body: Správa CHKO Latorica (CHKO Latorica Administration) in Trebišov

Latorica Protected Landscape Area (Slovak: Chránená krajinná oblasť Latorica) is the second lowland protected landscape area in Slovakia. It is located in the south-eastern Slovakia, in the Trebišov and Michalovce districts.

== Geography, geology and ecology ==
The park is located around the Slovak part of Latorica river and around lower part of Ondava and Laborec rivers. The landscape area consists of the system of riverbeds and arms, surrounded by alluvial forest and wetlands. The most noticeable phenomenon of the PLA is the rare water and swamp biocenose, unique in Slovakia.

A part of river's watershed ("Ramsar site No. 606", 44.05 km²) was added to the Ramsar list of wetlands of international importance since 1993.

== Fauna ==
There were recorded 82 species of molluscs in the Latorica PLA: 36 species of terrestrial gastropods and 46 species of freshwater molluscs.

Due to the location and character of this PLA, the area is used by waterfowl, not only for nesting, but also, in the case of migratory birds, for short rests.
