= Topľa =

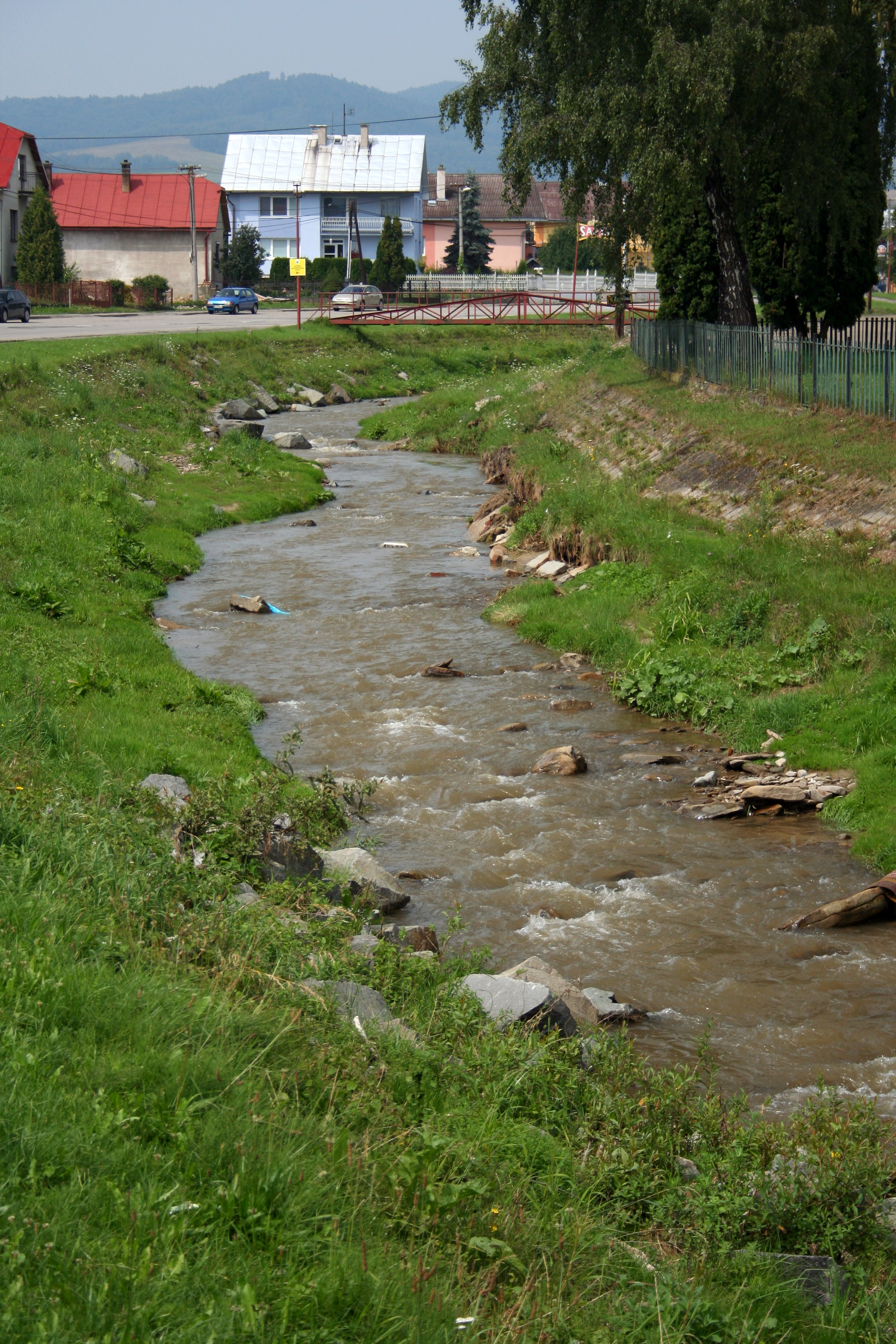

Location
- Country: Slovakia

Physical characteristics
- Source
  - location: Čergov mountains
- Mouth
  - location: Ondava at Parchovany
  - coordinates: 48.7435°N 21.7578°E
- Length: 131.4 km (81.6 mi)
- Basin size: 1,544 km^{2} (596 sq mi)

Basin features
- Progression: Ondava→ Bodrog→ Tisza→ Danube→ Black Sea

Topľa (Hungarian: Tapoly, German: Töpl) is a river in eastern Slovakia and right tributary of the Ondava. It is 131.4 km (81.6 mi) long and its basin covers an area of 1,544 km^{2} (596 sq mi). It rises in the Čergov mountains, flows through Ondava Highlands, Beskidian Piedmont, Eastern Slovak Hills and Eastern Slovak Flat and flows into the Ondava in the cadastral area of Parchovany. It flows through the towns of Bardejov, Giraltovce, Hanušovce nad Topľou and Vranov nad Topľou.

== Etymology ==
The name come from Slavic (Slovak) Teplá: warm (river). The name was adopted by Hungarians and then it was adopted back (in the modified form) by Slovaks, probably in the 13th century.
