= Nižná Polianka =

- Municipality
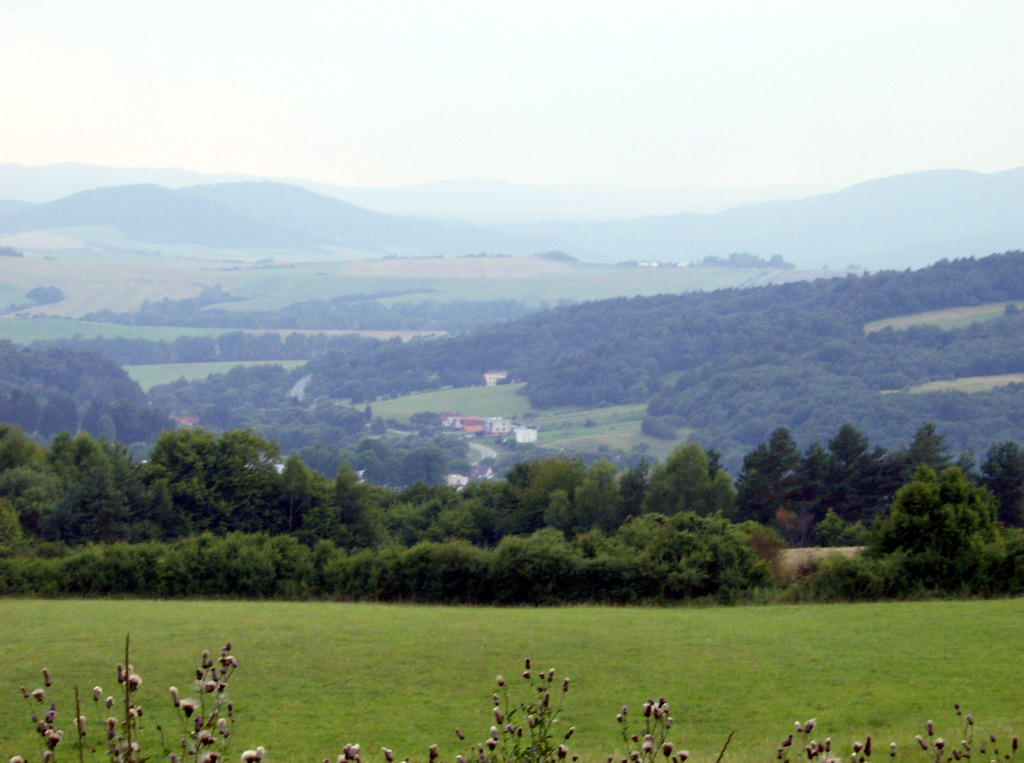
- Nižná Polianka from the route to border with Poland

- Flag Coat of arms

- Location of Nižná Polianka in the Prešov Region Location of Nižná Polianka in Slovakia
- Coordinates: 49.40°N 21.40°E
- Country: Slovakia
- Region: Prešov Region
- District: Bardejov District
- First mentioned: 1435

Area
  - Total: 5.88 km^{2} (2.27 sq mi)
- Elevation: 385 m (1,263 ft)

Population (2025)
  - Total: 223
- Time zone: UTC+1 (CET)
  - Summer (DST): UTC+2 (CEST)
- Postal code: 863 6
- Area code: +421 54
- Vehicle registration plate (until 2022): BJ
- Website: obecniznapolianka.sk

Nižná Polianka (Rusyn: Нижня Полянка; Hungarian: Alsópagony) is a village and municipality in Bardejov District in the Prešov Region of north-east Slovakia.

== History ==
In historical records the village was first mentioned in 1435

== Geography ==
The municipality lies at an altitude of 385 metres (1,263 ft) and covers an area of 5.88 km^{2} (2.27 sq mi) (2025).

== Population ==
Population statistic (10 years)
Year	1995	2005	2015	2025
Count	262	251	239	223
Difference		−4.19%	−4.78%	−6.69%

Population statistic
Year	2024	2025
Count	220	223
Difference		+1.36%

It has a population of 223 people (31 December 2025).

=== Ethnicity ===
Census 2021 (1+ %)
Ethnicity	Number	Fraction
Slovak	188	85.06%
Rusyn	109	49.32%
Not found out	6	2.71%
Ukrainian	5	2.26%
Total	221	

In year 2021 was 221 people by ethnicity 188 as Slovak, 109 as Rusyn, 6 as Not found out, 5 as Ukrainian, 1 as Romani and 1 as Polish.

Note on population: The difference values of population numbers in the table "Population statistic" and in the sections "Ethnicity" & "Religion" is caused by the use of various statistical methods.

=== Religion ===
Census 2021 (1+ %)
Religion	Number	Fraction
Eastern Orthodox Church	106	47.96%
Greek Catholic Church	69	31.22%
Roman Catholic Church	29	13.12%
None	11	4.98%
Not found out	3	1.36%
Total	221	

In year 2021 was 221 people by religion 106 from Eastern Orthodox Church, 69 from Greek Catholic Church, 29 from Roman Catholic Church, 11 from None, 3 from Not found out, 2 from Evangelical Church and 1 from Calvinist Church.

== Gallery ==
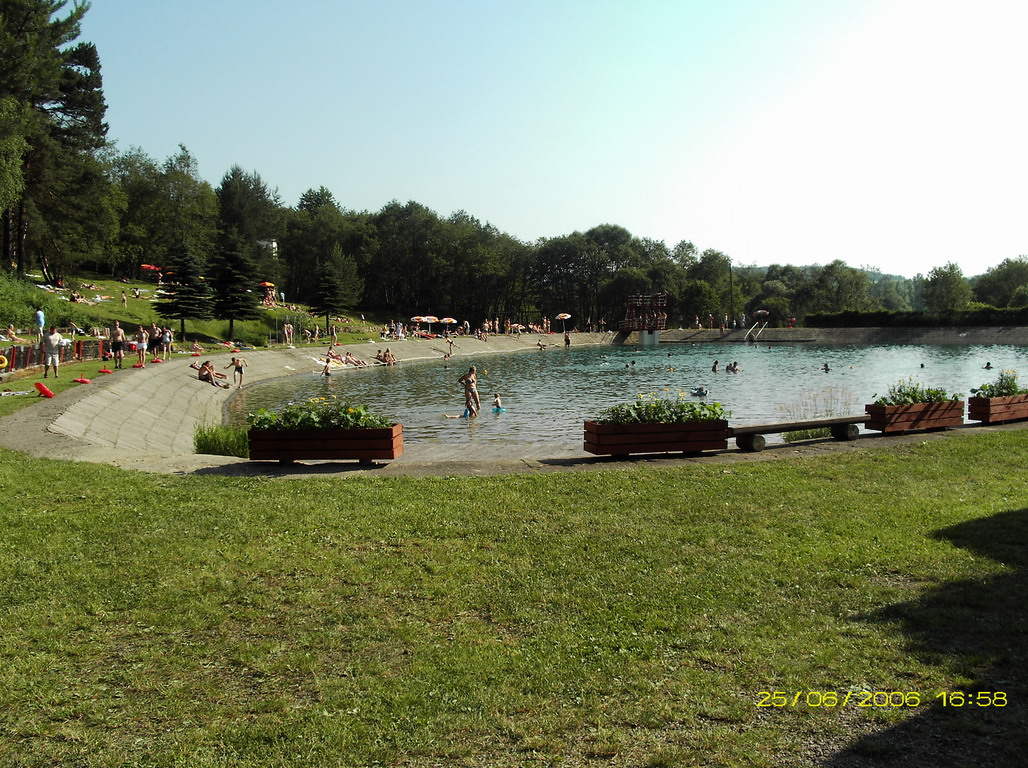
swimming pool

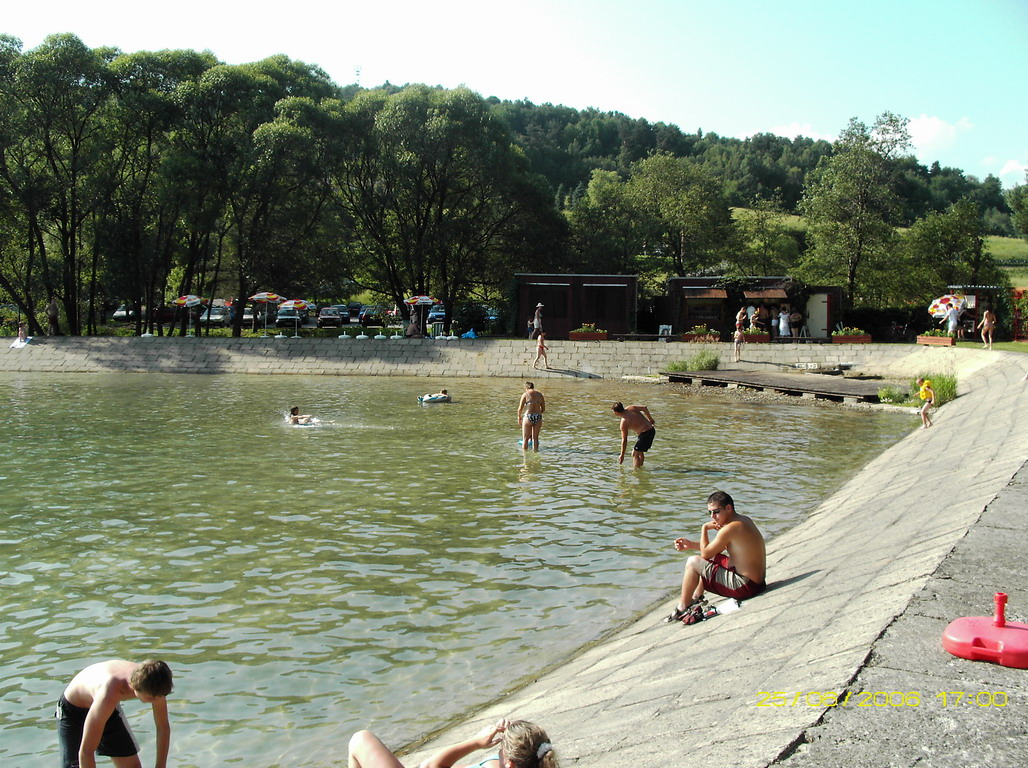
swimming pool

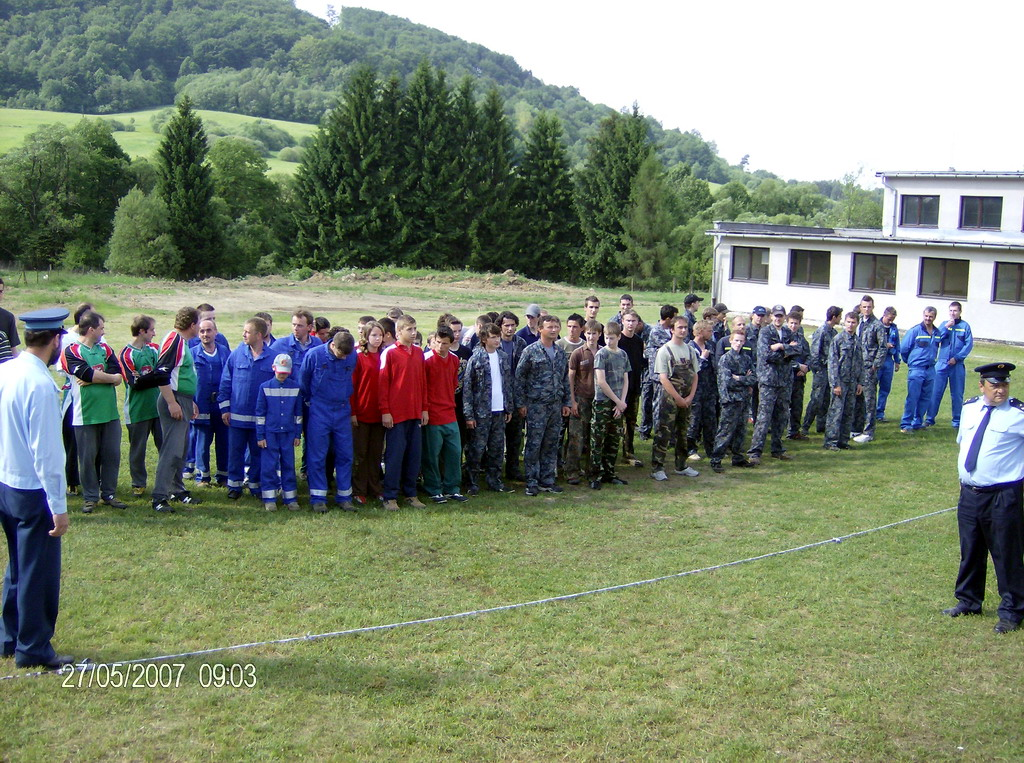
hasičská súťaž

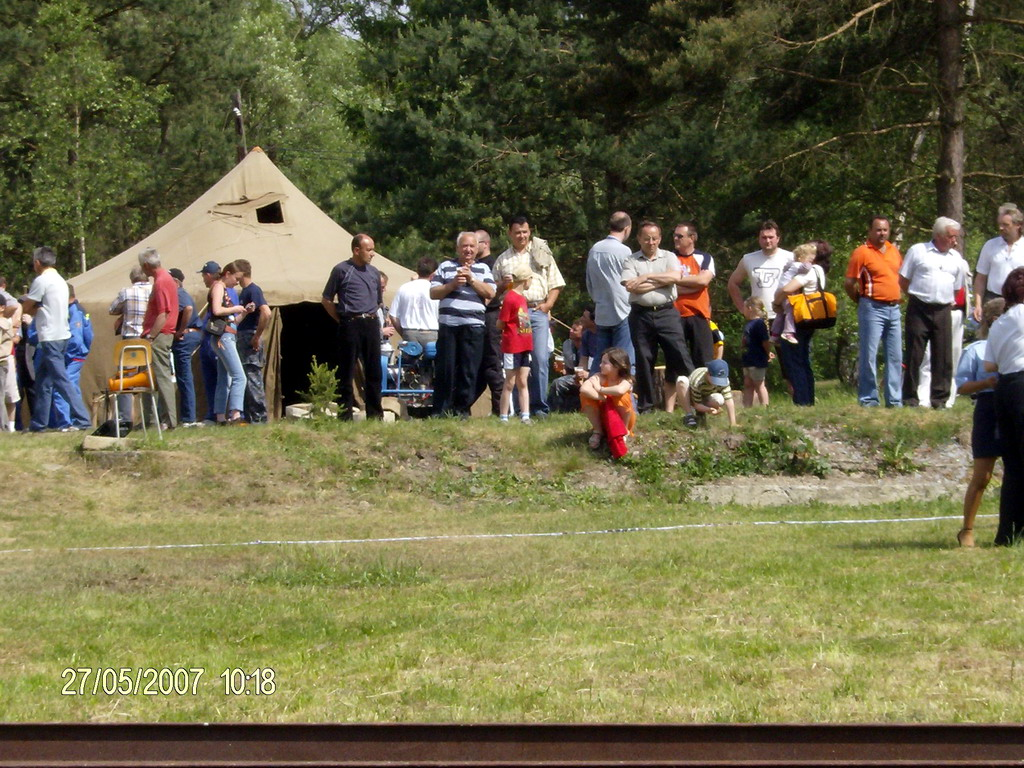
hasičská súťaž

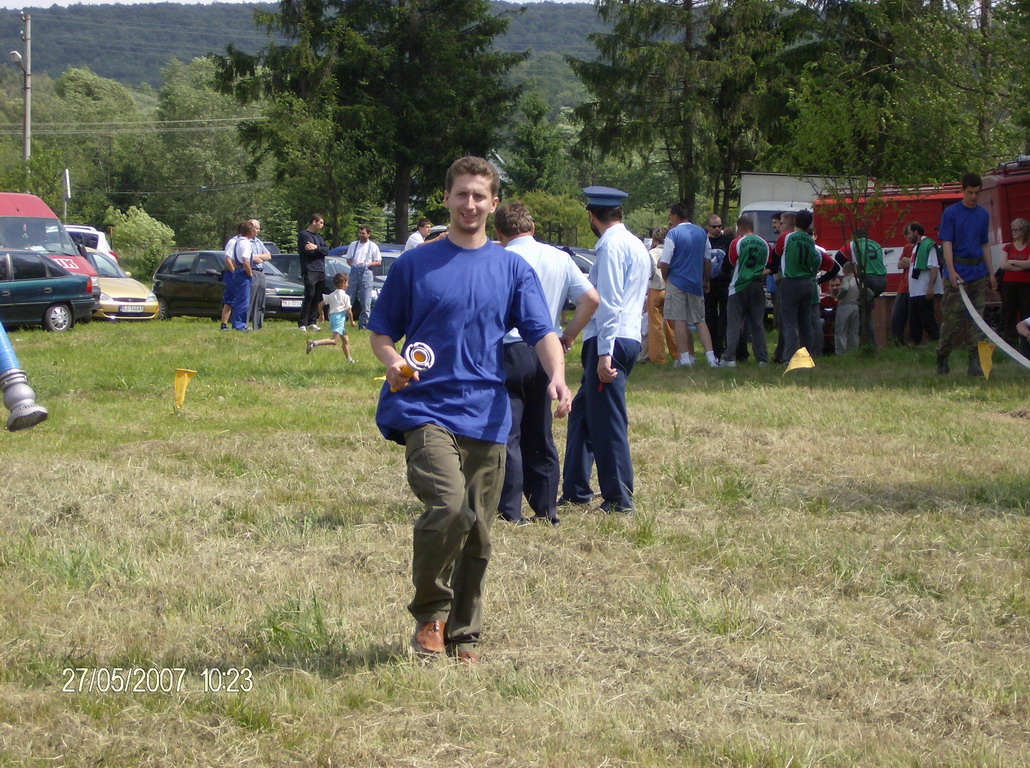
hasičská súťaž
