= Zemplín (village) =

Zemplín Zemplén
- Municipality
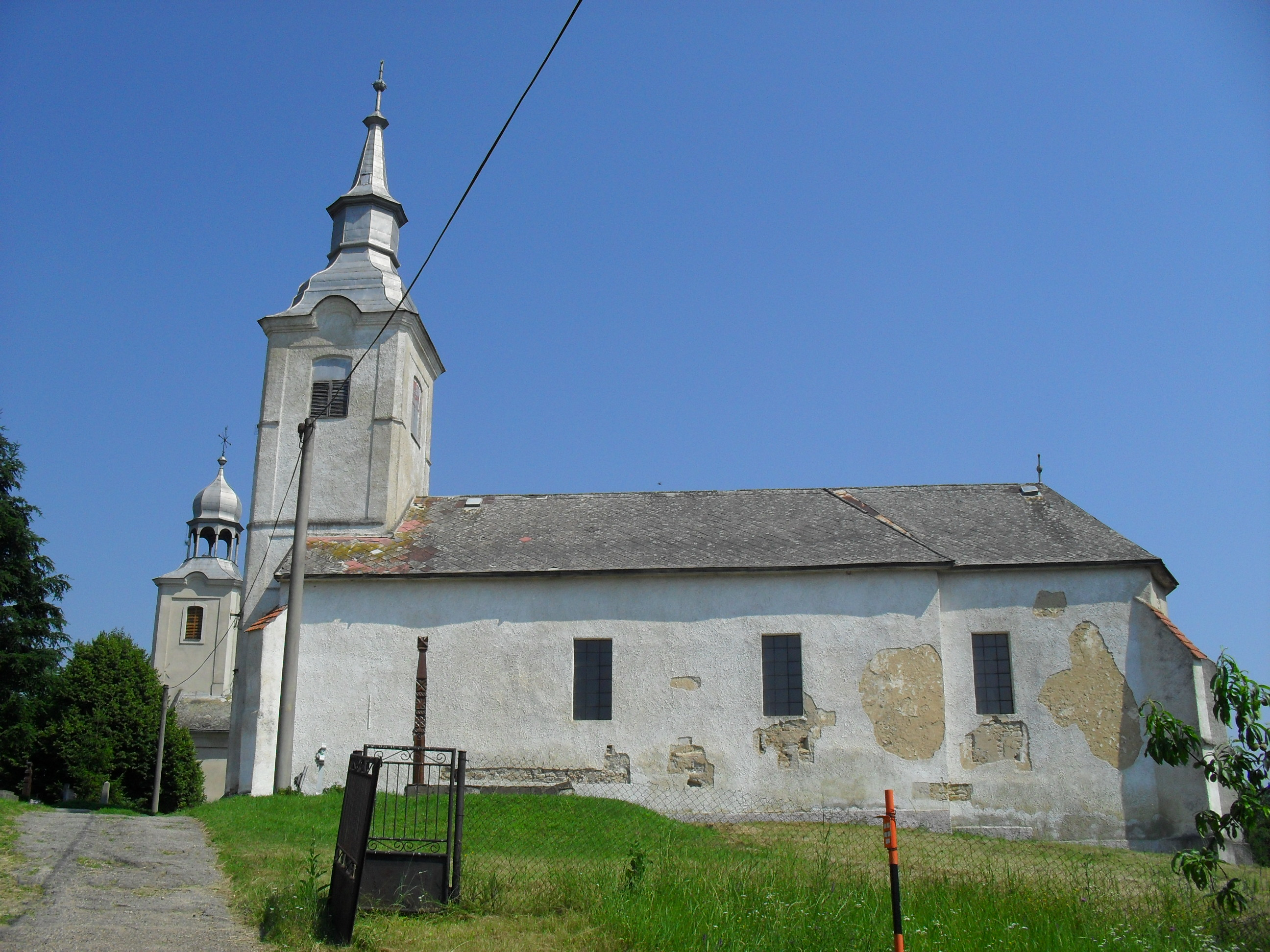
- Reformed church

- Flag

- Location of Zemplín in the Košice Region Location of Zemplín in Slovakia
- Coordinates: 48°26′N 21°49′E
- Country: Slovakia
- Region: Košice Region
- District: Trebišov District
- First mentioned: 1261

Area
  - Total: 14.66 km^{2} (5.66 sq mi)
- Elevation: 110 m (360 ft)

Population (2025)
  - Total: 378
- Time zone: UTC+1 (CET)
  - Summer (DST): UTC+2 (CEST)
- Postal code: 763 4
- Area code: +421 56
- Vehicle registration plate (until 2022): TV
- Website: www.obeczemplin.sk

Zemplín (Hungarian: Zemplén) is a village and municipality in Trebišov District of the Košice Region.

== History ==
In historical records the village was first mentioned in 1214. Zemplín is also the location of Zemplín Castle, former administrative center of the former Zemplén County during the time the Kingdom of Hungary ruled the area.

== Geography ==
The municipality lies at an altitude of 110 metres (360 ft) and covers an area of 14.66 km^{2} (5.66 sq mi) (2025). It is located near the junction point of the rivers Ondava and Latorica (tributaries of the river Bodrog) in eastern Slovakia.

== Population ==
Population statistic (10 years)
Year	1995	2005	2015	2025
Count	400	404	382	378
Difference		+1%	−5.44%	−1.04%

Population statistic
Year	2024	2025
Count	367	378
Difference		+2.99%

It has a population of 378 people (31 December 2025).

=== Ethnicity ===
Census 2021 (1+ %)
Ethnicity	Number	Fraction
Hungarian	230	65.15%
Slovak	135	38.24%
Not found out	10	2.83%
Romani	4	1.13%
Total	353	

In year 2021 was 353 people by ethnicity 230 as Hungarian, 135 as Slovak, 10 as Not found out, 4 as Romani and 1 as Czech.

Note on population: The difference values of population numbers in the table "Population statistic" and in the sections "Ethnicity" & "Religion" is caused by the use of various statistical methods.

=== Religion ===
Census 2021 (1+ %)
Religion	Number	Fraction
Greek Catholic Church	120	33.99%
Calvinist Church	86	24.36%
Roman Catholic Church	75	21.25%
None	40	11.33%
Jehovah's Witnesses	15	4.25%
Not found out	7	1.98%
Evangelical Church	4	1.13%
Total	353	

In year 2021 was 353 people by religion 120 from Greek Catholic Church, 86 from Calvinist Church, 75 from Roman Catholic Church, 40 from None, 15 from Jehovah's Witnesses, 7 from Not found out, 4 from Evangelical Church, 3 from Eastern Orthodox Church, 1 from Other and not ascertained christian church, 1 from Other and 1 from United Methodist Church.

According to the 2001 census, 64.2% of inhabitants were Hungarians and 35.8% were Slovaks.

In 2019 the village had a population of 368.
