= Bodrog (river) =

Coordinates: 48°07′N 21°25′E

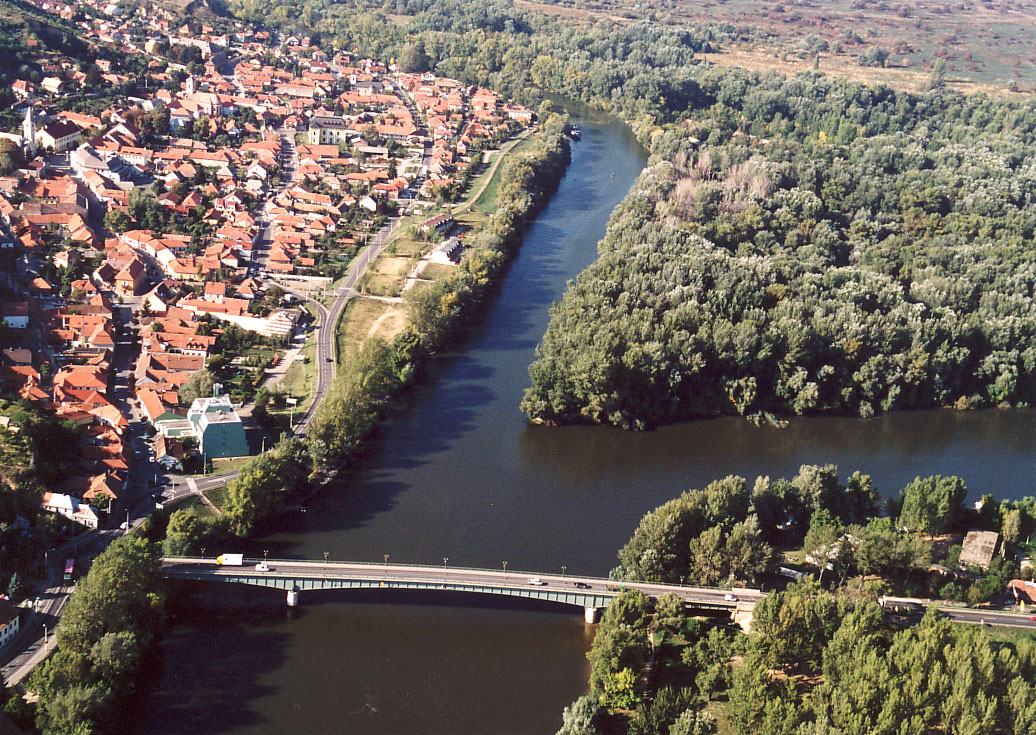
- River Tisza and Bodrog at Tokaj from above

Location
- Countries: Slovakia and Hungary

Physical characteristics
- Source
  - location: Confluence of Ondava and Latorica rivers in Slovakia
- Mouth
  - location: Tokaj
- Length: 67 km (42 mi)
- Basin size: 13,579 km^{2} (5,243 sq mi) or 14,310.6 km^{2} (5,525.4 mi^{2})
- Discharge
  - location: Tokaj, Hungary (near mouth)
  - average: 128 m^{3}/s (4,500 cu ft/s) 115.107 m^{3}/s (4,065.0 cu ft/s)

Basin features
- Progression: Tisza→ Danube→ Black Sea

The Bodrog is a river in eastern Slovakia and north-eastern Hungary. It is a tributary of the river Tisza. The Bodrog is formed by the confluence of the rivers Ondava and Latorica near Zemplín in eastern Slovakia. It crosses the Slovak–Hungarian border at the village of Felsőberecki (near Sátoraljaújhely) in Hungary, and Streda nad Bodrogom in Slovakia, where it is also the lowest point in Slovakia (94.3 m AMSL), and continues its flow through the Hungarian county Borsod-Abaúj-Zemplén, until it meets the river Tisza, in Tokaj. A town along its course is Sárospatak, in Hungary.

Its length is 67 km (42 mi) (15 in Slovakia, 52 in Hungary). Its watershed area is 13,579 km^{2} (5,243 sq mi) of which 972 km^{2} (375 sq mi) is in Hungary. The river is rich in fish.
