= Streda nad Bodrogom =

Streda nad Bodrogom Bodrogszerdahely
- Municipality
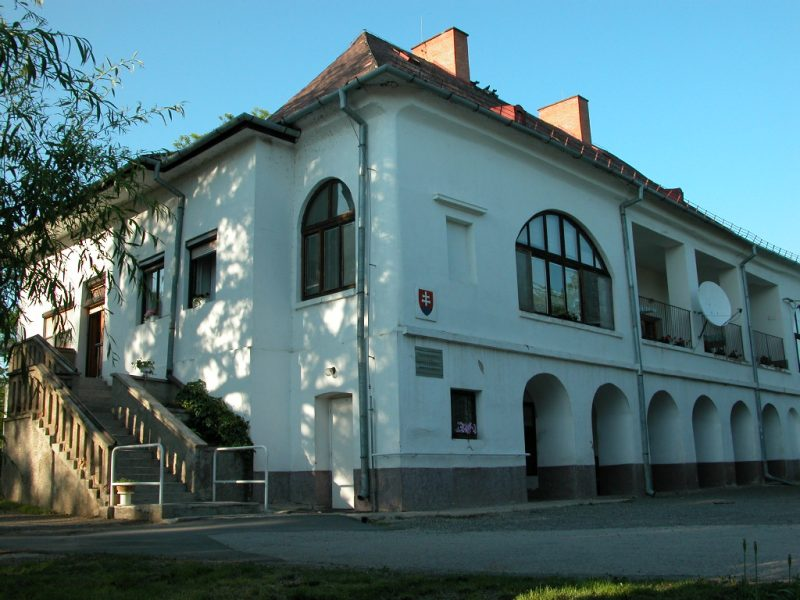
- Orosz family manor

- Flag Coat of arms

- Location of Streda nad Bodrogom in the Košice Region Location of Streda nad Bodrogom in Slovakia
- Coordinates: 48.38°N 21.77°E
- Country: Slovakia
- Region: Košice Region
- District: Trebišov District
- First mentioned: 1270

Government
  - Mayor: Zoltán Mento (Ind.)

Area
  - Total: 22.63 km^{2} (8.74 sq mi)
- Elevation: 101 m (331 ft)

Population (2025)
  - Total: 2,231
- Time zone: UTC+1 (CET)
  - Summer (DST): UTC+2 (CEST)
- Postal code: 763 1
- Area code: +421 56
- Vehicle registration plate (until 2022): TV
- Website: www.stredanadbodrogom.sk

Streda nad Bodrogom (Hungarian: Bodrogszerdahely) is a village in Slovakia near Trebišov in the Košice Region.

The village has the lowest altitude (94 metres (308 ft) above sea level) in Slovakia.

The village is an important archaeological site (findings from the Mesolithic, Neolithic, Eneolithic, Bronze Age, grave-mounds from the late 1st century BC, Slavic finds from the 7th and 8th century and early Magyar graves).

The first written mention of the village dates back to 1320. An old castle near the village was destroyed by imperial (Austrian) troops in 1670.

In 2001, it had a population of 2,459, of whom 1,476 were ethnic Hungarians (60.02%), 896 Slovak (36.43%) and 87 (3.53%) other, mainly Romani.

== Geography ==
The municipality lies at an altitude of 101 metres (331 ft) and covers an area of 22.63 km^{2} (8.74 sq mi) (2025).

== Population ==
Population statistic (10 years)
Year	1995	2005	2015	2025
Count	2446	2407	2280	2231
Difference		−1.59%	−5.27%	−2.14%

Population statistic
Year	2024	2025
Count	2257	2231
Difference		−1.15%

It has a population of 2231 people (31 December 2025).

=== Ethnicity ===
Census 2021 (1+%)
Ethnicity	Number	Fraction
Hungarian	1362	59.81%
Slovak	1043	45.8%
Not found out	151	6.63%
Romani	24	1.05%
Total	2277	

In year 2021 was 2277 people by ethnicity 1362 as Hungarian, 1043 as Slovak, 151 as Not found out, 24 as Romani, 7 as Czech, 7 as Polish, 6 as Rusyn, 3 as Ukrainian, 2 as Russian, 2 as German, 2 as Croatian and 1 as Vietnamese.

Note on population: The difference values of population numbers in the table "Population statistic" and in the sections "Ethnicity" & "Religion" is caused by the use of various statistical methods.

=== Religion ===
Census 2021 (1+%)
Religion	Number	Fraction
Roman Catholic Church	806	35.4%
Calvinist Church	508	22.31%
Greek Catholic Church	428	18.8%
None	251	11.02%
Not found out	202	8.87%
Jehovah's Witnesses	44	1.93%
Evangelical Church	25	1.1%
Total	2277	

In year 2021 was 2277 people by religion 806 from Roman Catholic Church, 508 from Calvinist Church, 428 from Greek Catholic Church, 251 from None, 202 from Not found out, 44 from Jehovah's Witnesses, 25 from Evangelical Church, 3 from United Methodist Church, 2 from Eastern Orthodox Church, 2 from Christian Congregations in Slovakia, 2 from Ad hoc movements, 1 from Other and not ascertained christian church, 1 from Other, 1 from Hinduism and 1 from Seventh-day Adventist Church.
