= Ondavská Highlands =

Mountain range in Slovakia

Coordinates: 49°20′N 21°21′E

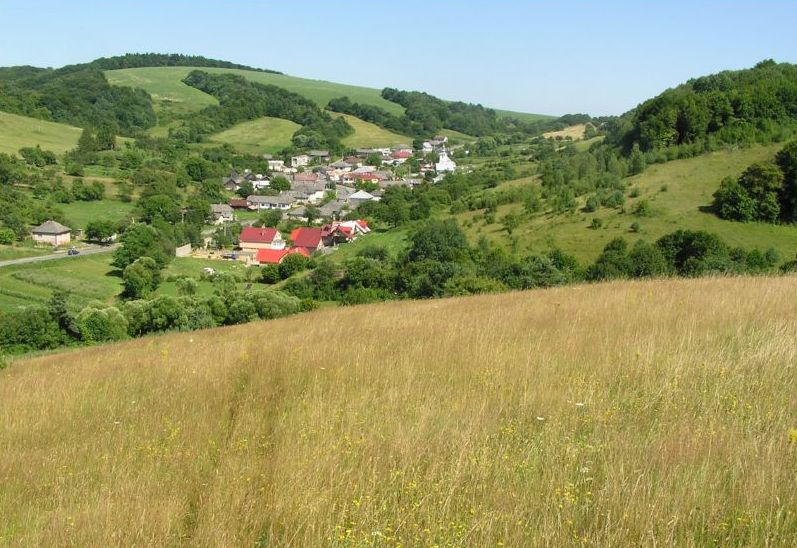
the village of Fijaš in the Ondavská Highlands

The Ondavská Highlands (in Slovak, Ondavská vrchovina) is a mountain range in the Prešov Region of Slovakia, named for the Ondava River. The mountains are part of the Lower Beskids ranges (known in Polish terminology as the Central Beskids), which are in turn part of the Outer Eastern Carpathians.

The mountains are characterized by gentle ridges, mostly wooded in deciduous forests of oak and beech, with long valleys formed by the Ondava and Topľa Rivers, and numerous hiking trails throughout. The valleys are occupied by agricultural lands.

The highest elevations are the Stebnícka Magura (900 meters), Javorina (881 meters), Smilniansky vrch (750 meters), Filipovský vrch (705 meters), Kačalová (676 meters) and Čierna hora (667 meters). These highlands border the Laborec Highlands.
