= Bodrog =

Bodrog may refer to:

- Bodrog (river), a tributary of the Tisza in Slovakia and Hungary
- Bodrog, Cluj, a village near Apahida in Romania
- Bodrog, Somogy County, near Kaposvár, Hungary
- SMS Bodrog, an Austro-Hungarian river monitor that fired the opening shots of the First World War, later became Yugoslav monitor Sava
- Bodrog (Bačka), a historical town in today's Serbia, eponym of the Bács-Bodrog County
- Bodrog County, a historical subdivision of the Kingdom of Hungary
