= Zemono =

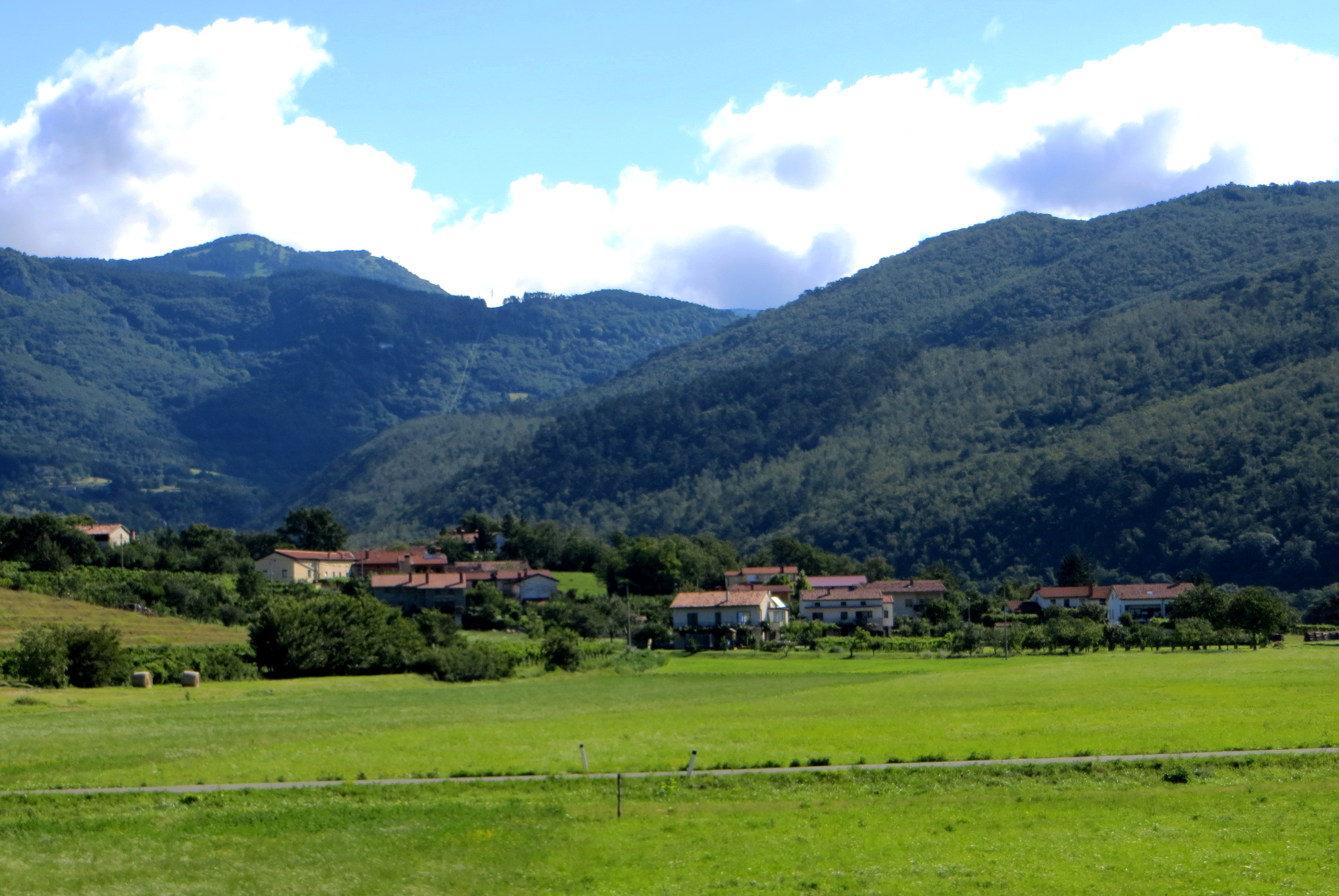

- Location in Slovenia
- Coordinates: 45°51′18.41″N 13°57′8.74″E
- Country: Slovenia
- Traditional region: Littoral
- Statistical region: Gorizia
- Municipality: Vipava

Area
  - Total: 0.82 km^{2} (0.32 sq mi)
- Elevation: 114.8 m (377 ft)

Population (2002)
  - Total: 82

Zemono (pronounced [zɛˈmoːnɔ]) is a small settlement in the Vipava Valley north of the town of Vipava in the Littoral region of Slovenia.

== Zemono Manor ==
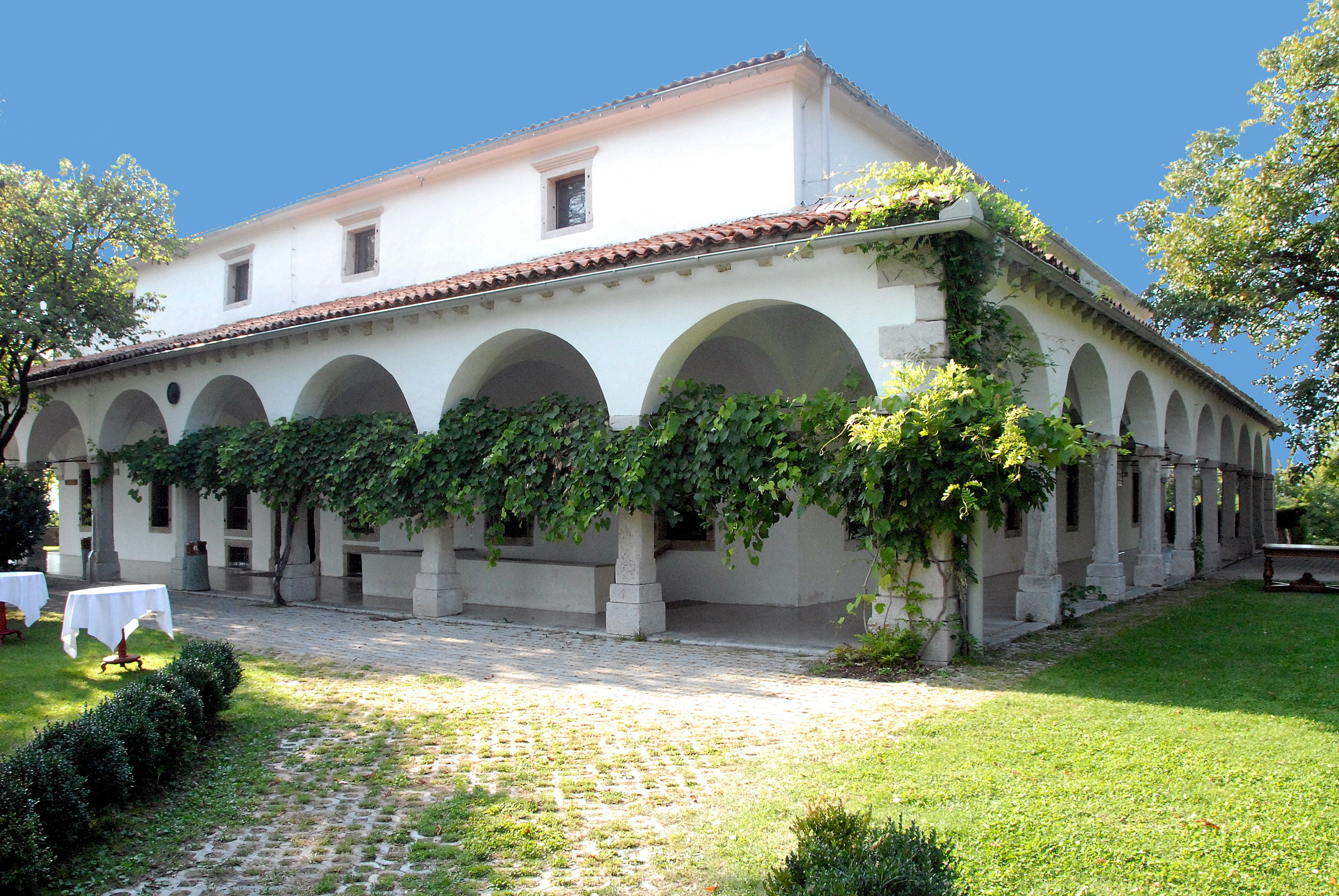
Zemono Manor

The Zemono Manor, built on a small hill above the settlement, is a 17th-century manor house. Unusually for the area, it is built in the Palladian style with a rectangular floor plan. The renovated building is surrounded by a park and vineyards.
