= Outer Subcarpathia =

Outer Subcarpathian regions (section I. outlined in red)

Outer Subcarpathian regions (section II. outlined in red)

Outer Subcarpathia (Polish: Podkarpacie Zewnętrzne; Ukrainian: Прикарпаття, romanized: Prykarpattia, lit. 'Ciscarpathia'; Czech: Vněkarpatské sníženiny; German: Karpatenvorland) denotes the depression area at the outer (western, northern and eastern) base of the Carpathian arc, including foothills of the Outer Western Carpathians and Outer Eastern Carpathians. It stretches from northeastern Austria, through eastern Czech Republic, southern Poland, western Ukraine and northeastern Romania.

The opposite foothill regions on the inner side of the Carpathian arc are known as Inner Subcarpathia, transitioning further to the Pannonian Basin.

== Geography ==
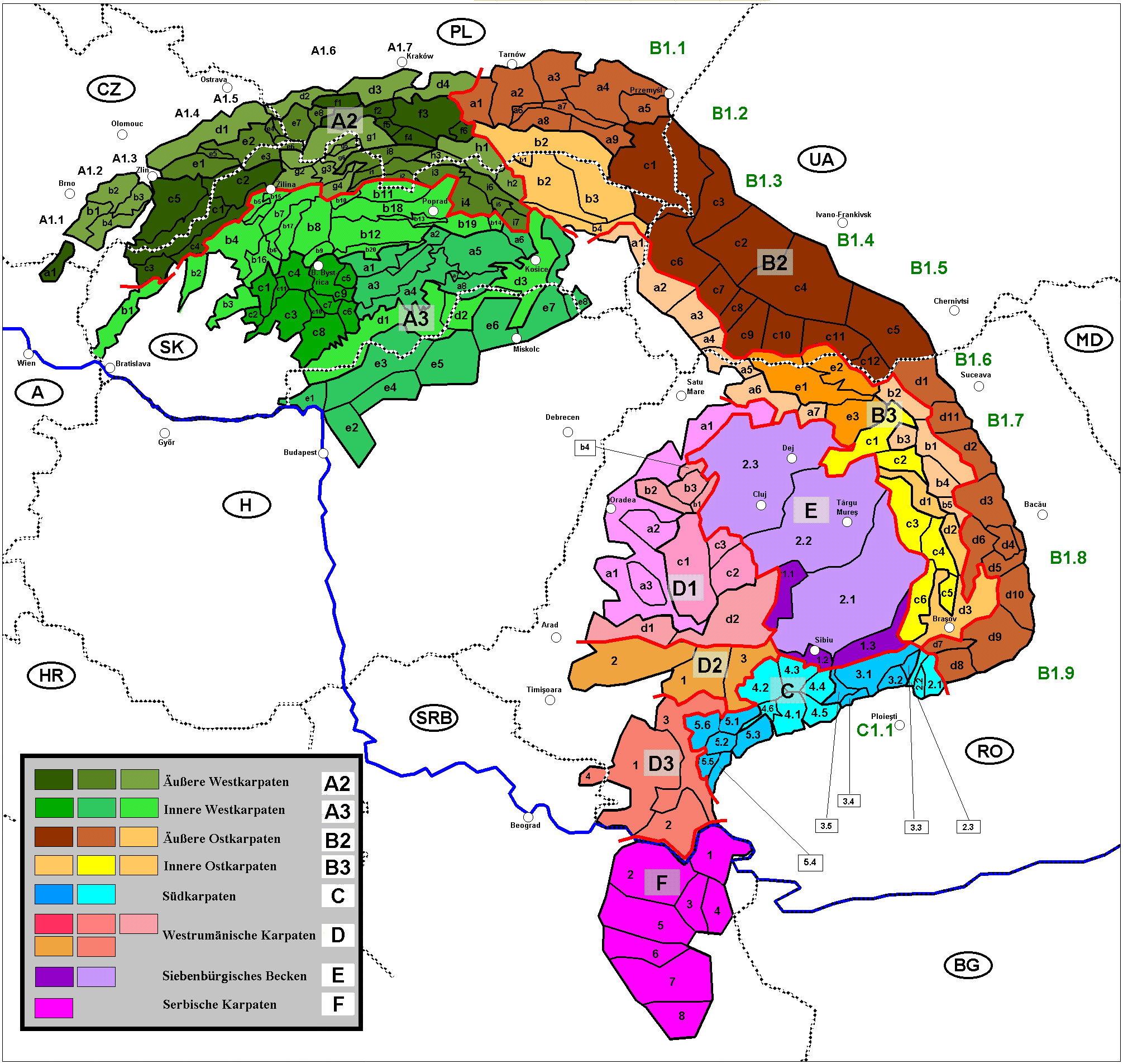
Outer Subcarpathian regions, surrounding the Carpathian arc, and marked: A1, B1, C1

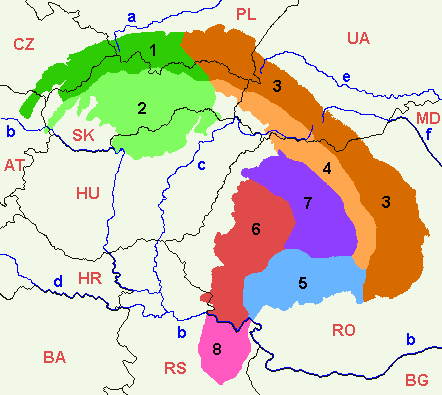
Outer Carpathian regions (1 and 3) on the map of the main divisions of the Carpathians: 1. Outer Western Carpathians; 2. Inner Western Carpathians; 3. Outer Eastern Carpathians; 4. Inner Eastern Carpathians; 5. Southern Carpathians; 6. Western Romanian Carpathians; 7. Transylvanian Plateau; 8. Serbian Carpathians

The western end is marked by the (northern) Vienna Basin, separating it from the Eastern Alpine Foreland. The adjacent hilly landscape of the Lower Austrian Weinviertel region with its extensive loess layers border on the limestone rock formations of the South-Moravian Carpathians.

In the Czech Republic, the depression is situated on the outskirts of the White Carpathians in Moravia, including the Pálava Protected Landscape Area. In Poland they stretch along the Lesser Poland Voivodeship to the Podkarpackie Voivodeship, part of the Galicia historic region that leads to Ukraine (Lviv, Ivano-Frankivsk and Chernivtsi Oblast) and the Dniester Basin.

In Romania, the depression ends east of the Carpathian arc on the upper Moldova River within the Bukovina and Moldavia regions, bordering on the Wallachian Plain in the south.

== Subdivisions ==
- Weinviertel Foothills (DE: Weinviertler Hügelland; CZ: Weinviertelská pahorkatina; PL: Pogórze Weinviertel)
- Dyje–Svratka Valley (DE: Thaya-Schwarza-Talsenke; CZ: Dyjsko-svratecký úval) → A1.1
- Vyškov Gate (CZ: Vyškovská brána) → A1.2
- Upper Morava Valley (CZ: Hornomoravský úval) → A1.3
- Moravian Gate (CZ: Moravská brána) → A1.4
- Ostrava Basin (CZ: Ostravská pánev, PL: Kotlina Ostrawska) → A1.5
- Oświęcim Basin (PL: Kotlina Oświęcimska) → A1.6
- Kraków Gate (PL: Brama Krakowska) → A1.7
- Sandomierz Basin (PL: Kotlina Sandomierska) + San-Dniester Plain (PL: Płaskowyż Sańsko-Dniestrzański; UA: Сянсько-Дністровська рівнина) → B1.1
- Upper Dniester Valley (UA: Верхньодністровська улоговина) → B1.2
- Drohobych Highlands (PL: Wysoczyzna Drohobycka; UA: Дрогобицька височина) → B1.3
- Dniester Plain (UA: Придністровська рівнина) → B1.4
- Pokutian Upland (UA: Покутська височина) → B1.5
- Bukovinian Highlands (UA: Буковинське Прикарпаття; RO: Podișul Bucovinei) + Suceava Plateau (RO: Podișul Sucevei) → B1.6
- Moldavia-Siret Groove (RO: Culoarul Moldova-Siret) → B1.7
- Moldavian Subcarpathians (RO: Subcarpații Moldovei) → B1.8
- Muntenian Subcarpathians (RO: Subcarpații Munteniei) → B1.9
- Getic Subcarpathians (RO: Subcarpații Getici) + Getic Plateau (RO: Podișul Getic) → C1.1

== See also ==
- Divisions of the Carpathians
- South-Moravian Carpathians
- Central Moravian Carpathians
- Slovak-Moravian Carpathians
- Carpathian Flysch Belt
- Western Beskids
- West Beskidian Foothills
- Central Beskidian Piedmont
- Central Beskids
- Podkarpackie Voivodeship
- Wooded Carpathians
- Ukrainian Carpathians
- Eastern Beskids
- Eastern Carpathian Foothills
- Prykarpattia
- Pokuttya
- Bukovinian Subcarpathia
- Moldavian Subcarpathia
- Moldavian-Muntenian Carpathians
- Romanian Carpathians
- Transcarpathia
