= Ciucaș =

Ciucaș may refer to:

- Ciucaș Mountains, a mountain range in Southern Carpathians, Romania
- Ciucaș Peak, the highest peak of Ciucaş Mountains
- Ciucaș, an alternative name for the river Homorod, a tributary of the Olt in Romania
- Ciucaș (site), a natural reserve in Romania

== See also ==
- Ciuc (disambiguation)
