= Kraków Gate =

Kraków Gate may refer to:

- Kraków Gate (Lublin)
- Kraków Gate (Ojców National Park)
