= Western Beskidian Foothills =

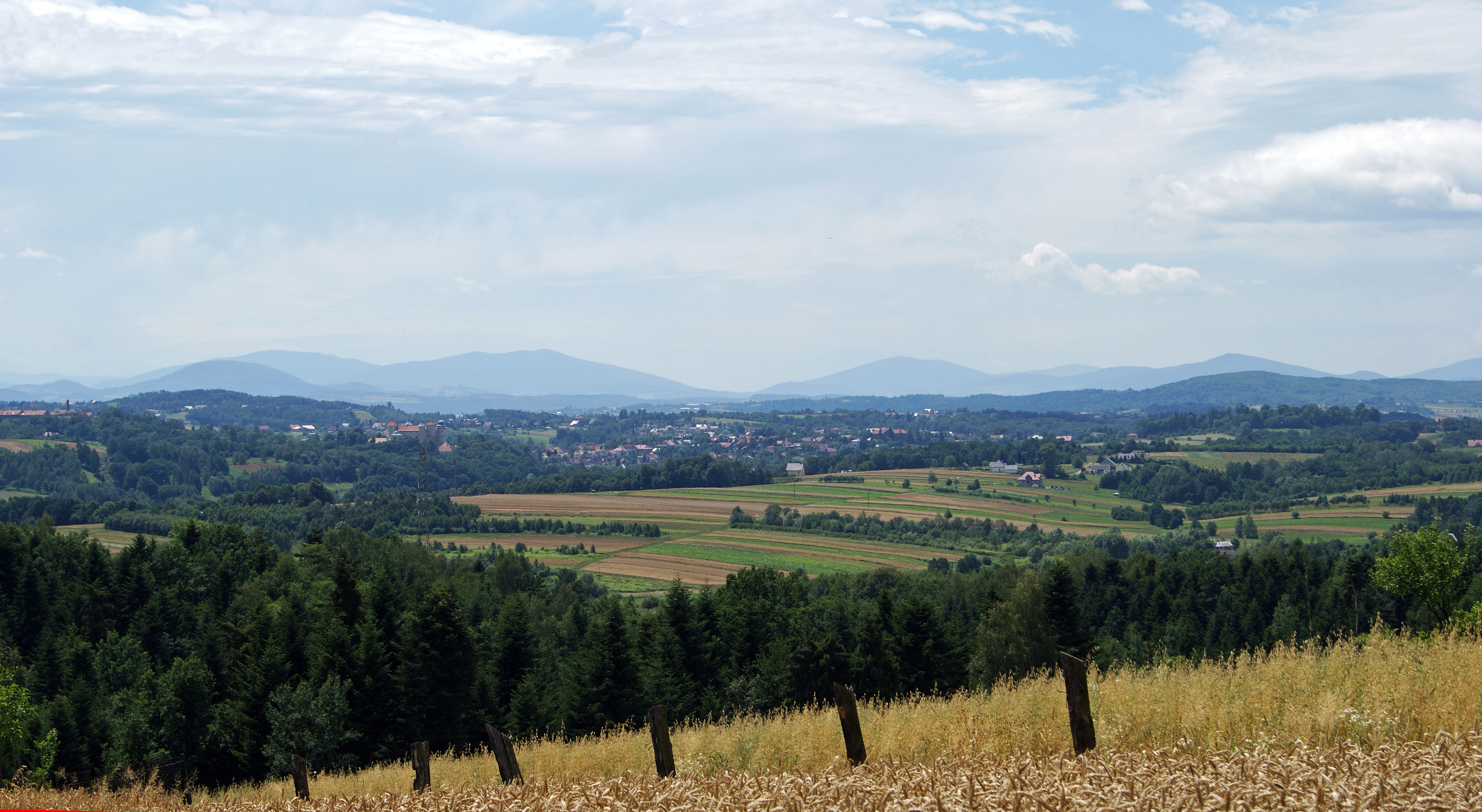
- Wiśnicki Foothills, southern Poland

Highest point
- Peak: Skalka
- Elevation: 964 m (3,163 ft)
- Coordinates: 49°33′12″N 18°17′54″E

Naming
- Native name: Pogórze Zachodniobeskidzkie (Polish); Západobeskydské podhůří (Czech)

Geography
- Western Beskidian Foothills, marked in red and labeled with letter D
- Countries: Czech Republic and Poland
- Regions: Moravia, Czech Silesia and Lesser Poland
- Parent range: Outer Western Carpathians
- Borders on: Western Beskids and Central Beskidian Piedmont

The Western Beskidian Foothills (Czech: Západobeskydské podhůří, Polish: Pogórze Zachodniobeskidzkie) is a geological region in the northeastern corner of the Czech Republic and extending into southern Poland. The relatively modest foothills are considered part of the Outer Western Carpathians.

== Subdivision ==
The Western Beskidian Foothills consists of four subranges (from west to east):

- Moravian-Silesian Foothills (Czech: Podbeskydská pahorkatina, Polish: Pogórze Śląsko-Morawskie)
- Silesian Foothills (Polish: Pogórze Śląskie)
- Wieliczka Foothills (Polish: Pogórze Wielickie)
- Wiśnicz Foothills (Polish: Pogórze Wiśnickie)

== See also ==
- Beskids
- Western Beskids
- Western Carpathians
- Outer Subcarpathian regions

== Literature ==
- Földvary, Gábor Z. (1988). Geology of the Carpathian Region. Singapore: World Scientific Publishing Company. ISBN 9789813103825.

== Maps ==
Moravian-Silesian Foothills, marked in red and labeled with D1

Silesian Foothills, marked in red and labeled with D2

Wieliczka Foothills, marked in red and labeled with D3

Wiśnicz Foothills, marked in red and labeled with D4

== Gallery ==
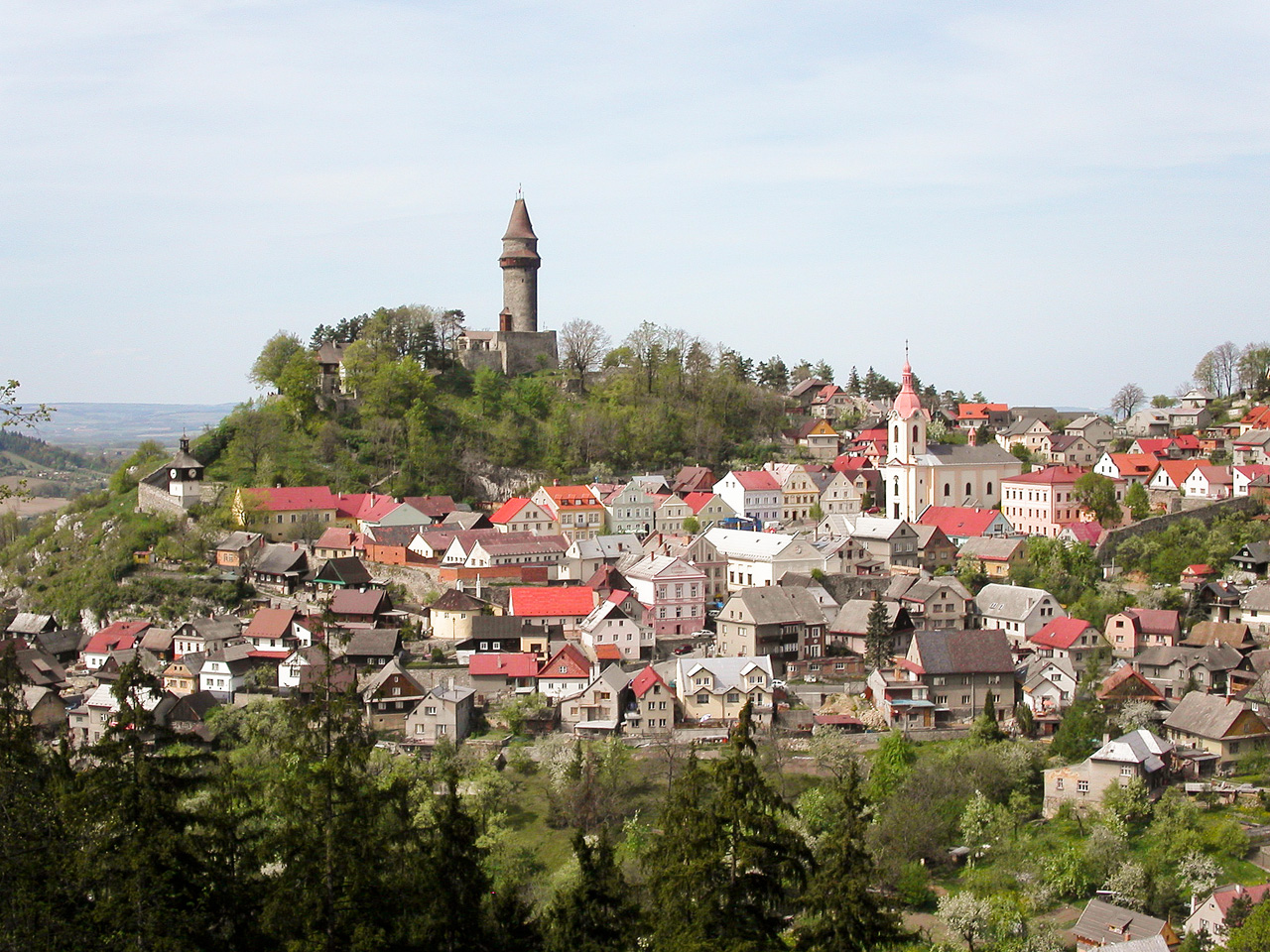
Štramberk, Moravian-Silesian Foothills

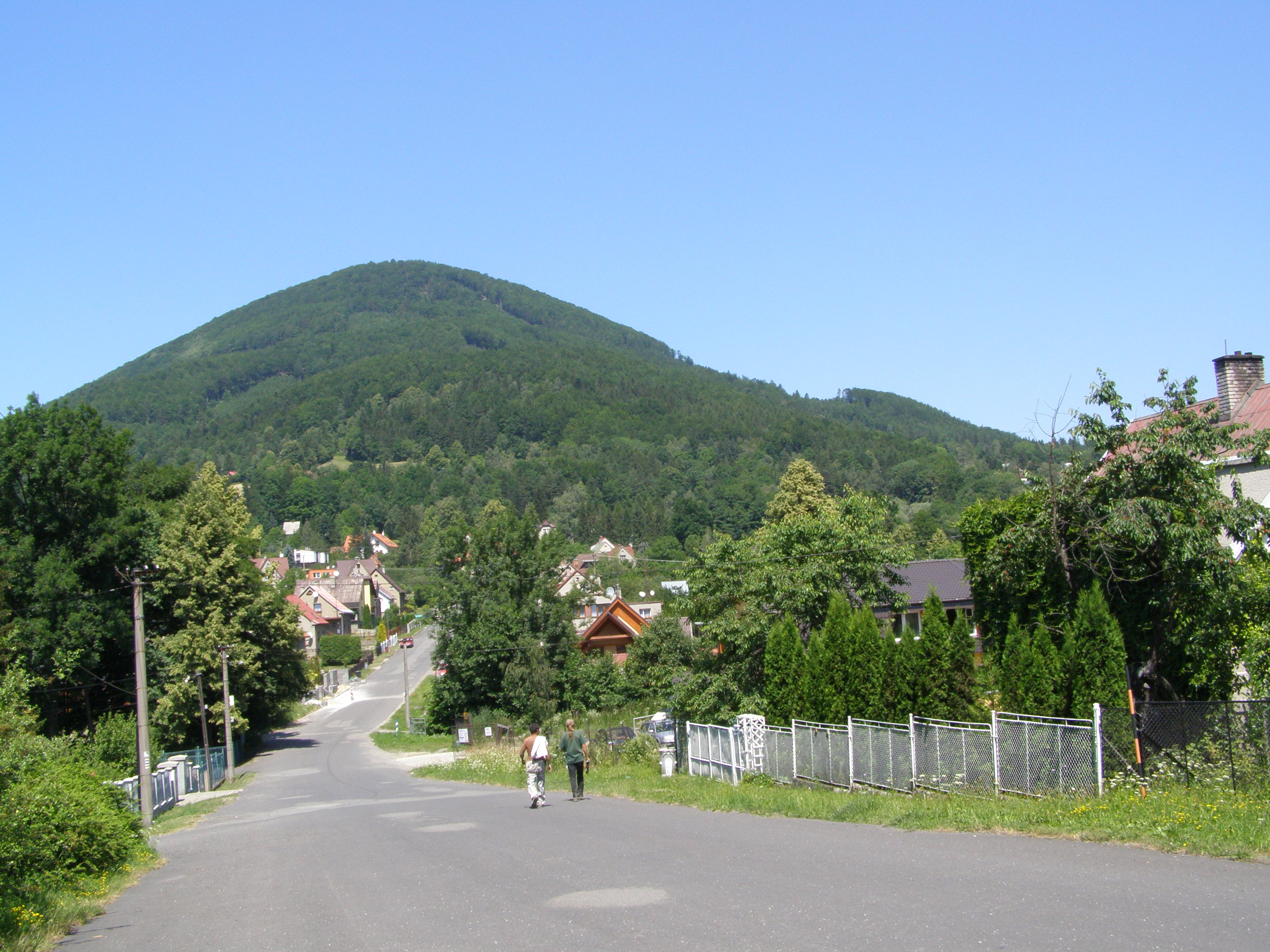
Skalka mountain seen from Kunčice pod Ondřejníkem, Moravian-Silesian Foothills

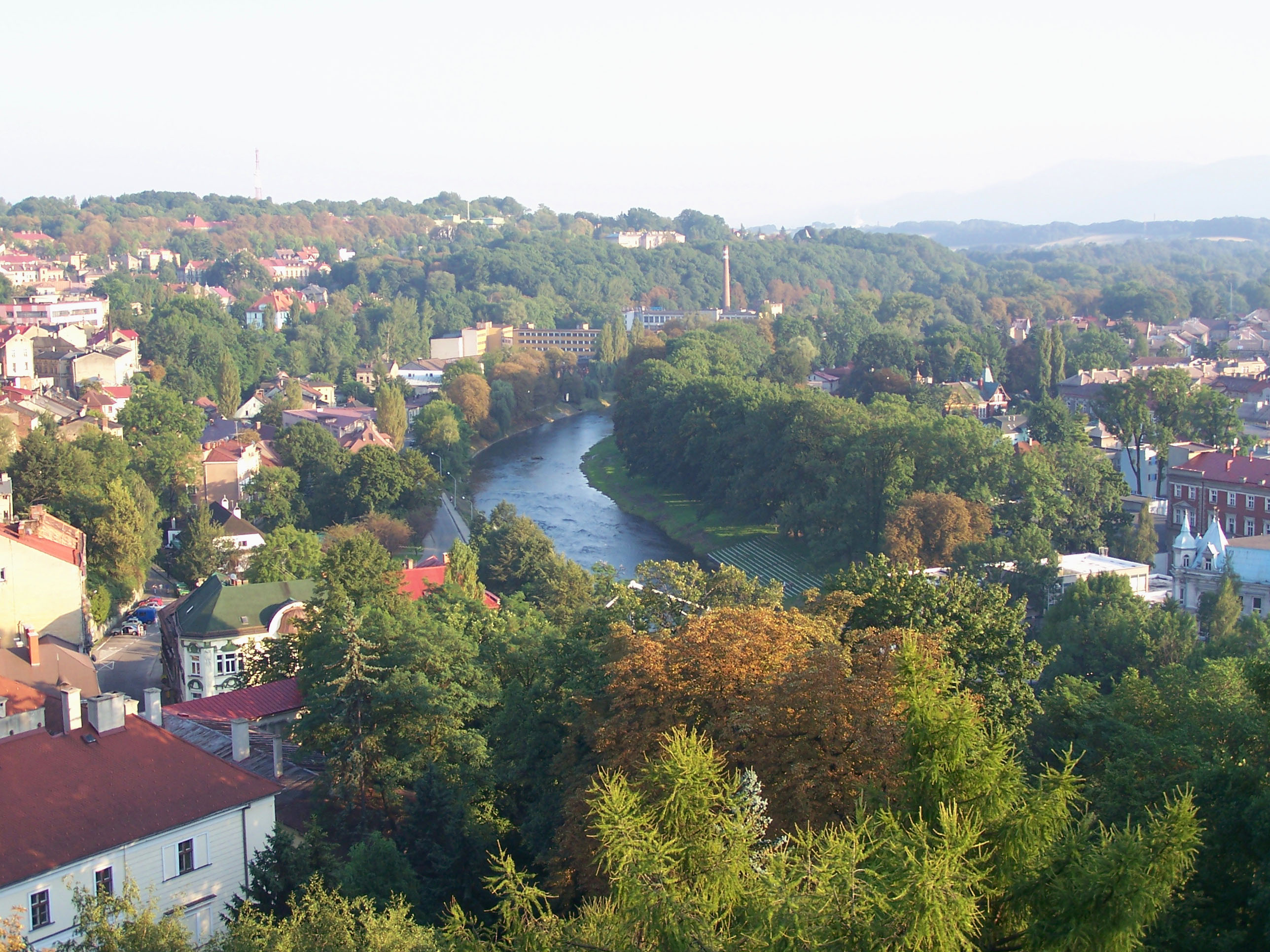
Olza river between Cieszyn and Český Těšín, Silesian Foothills

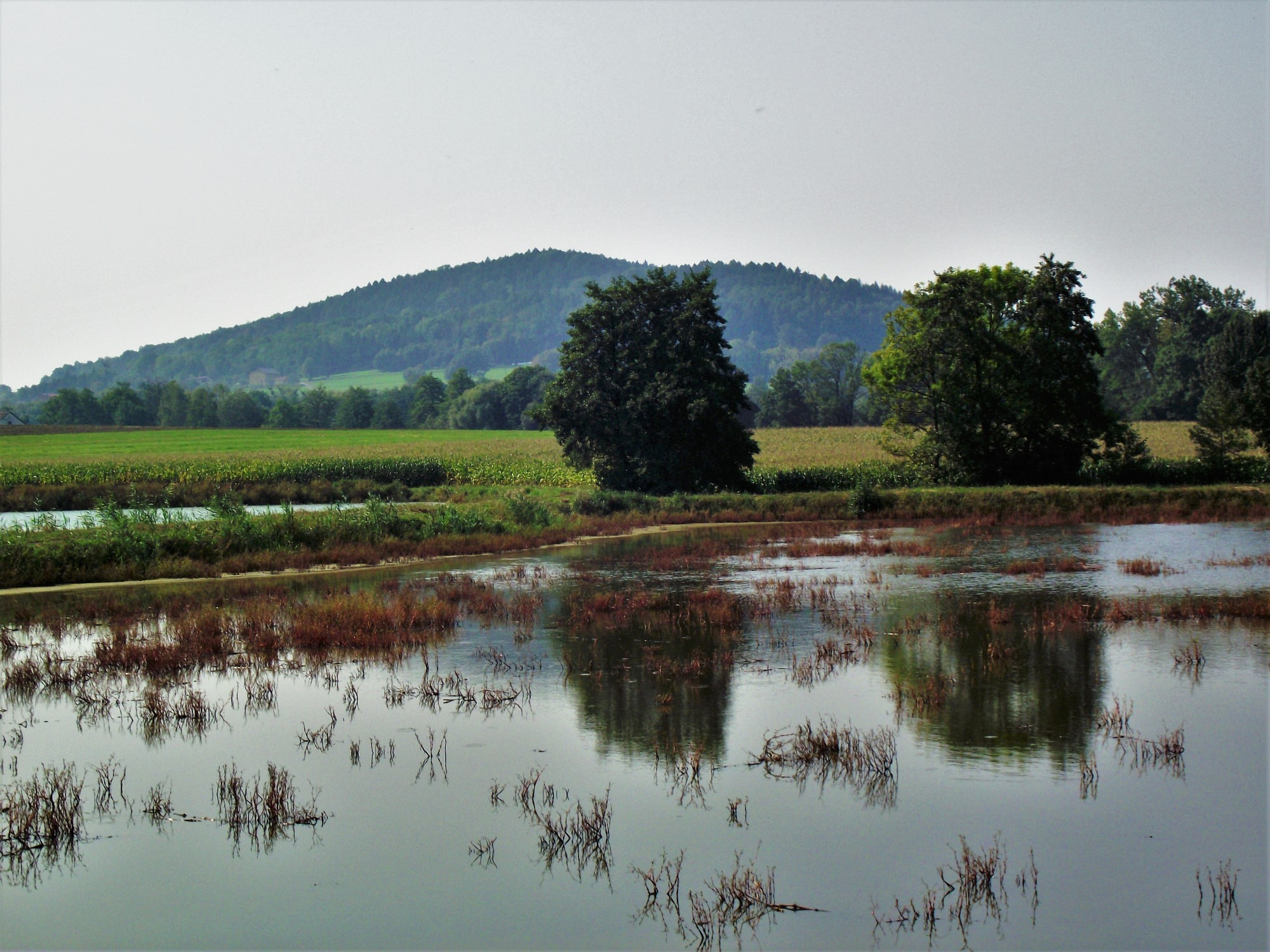
Chełm mountain seen from Godziszów, Silesian Foothills

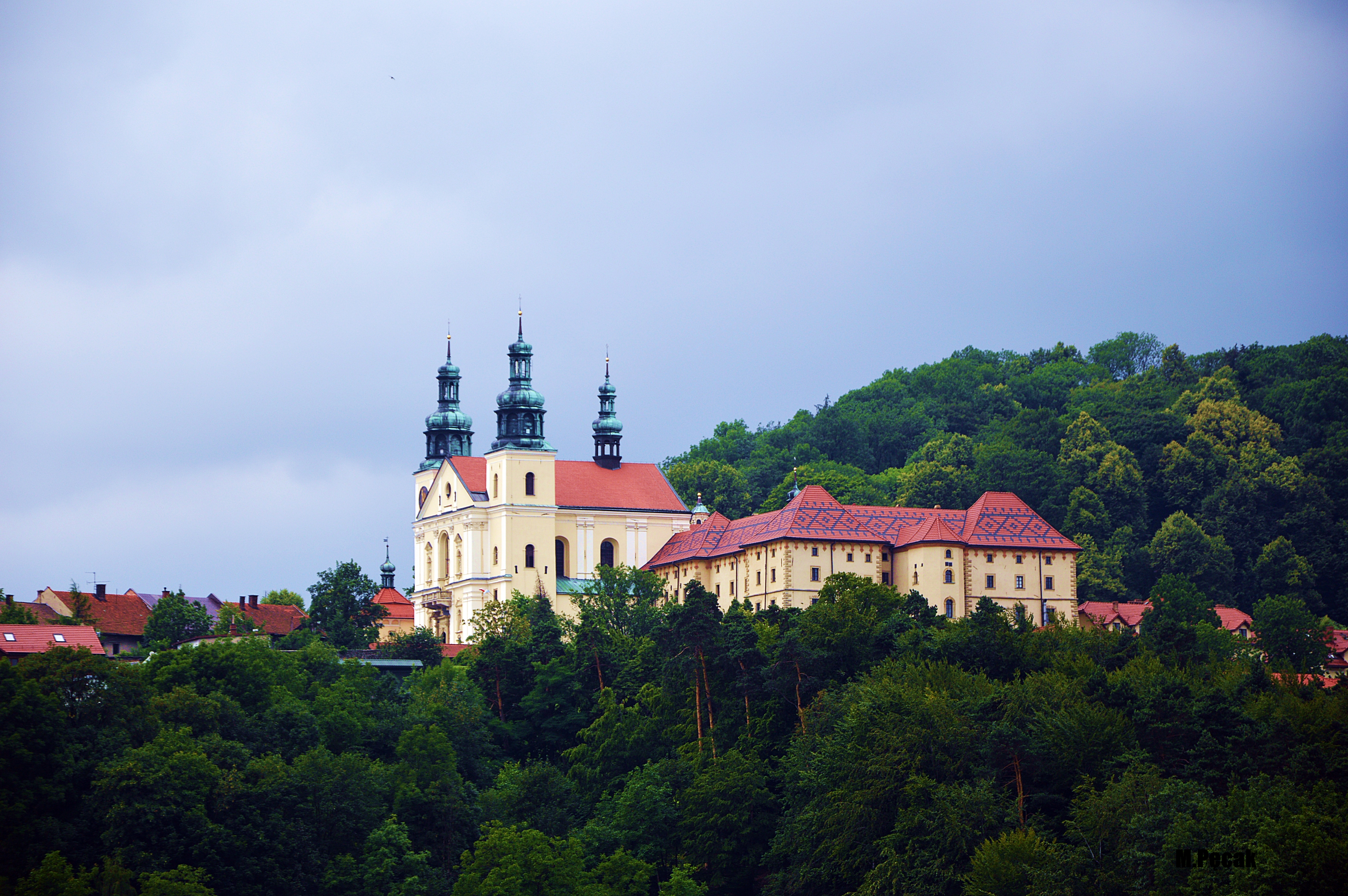
Basilica of St. Mary in the Kalwaria Zebrzydowska Park, Wieliczka Foothills

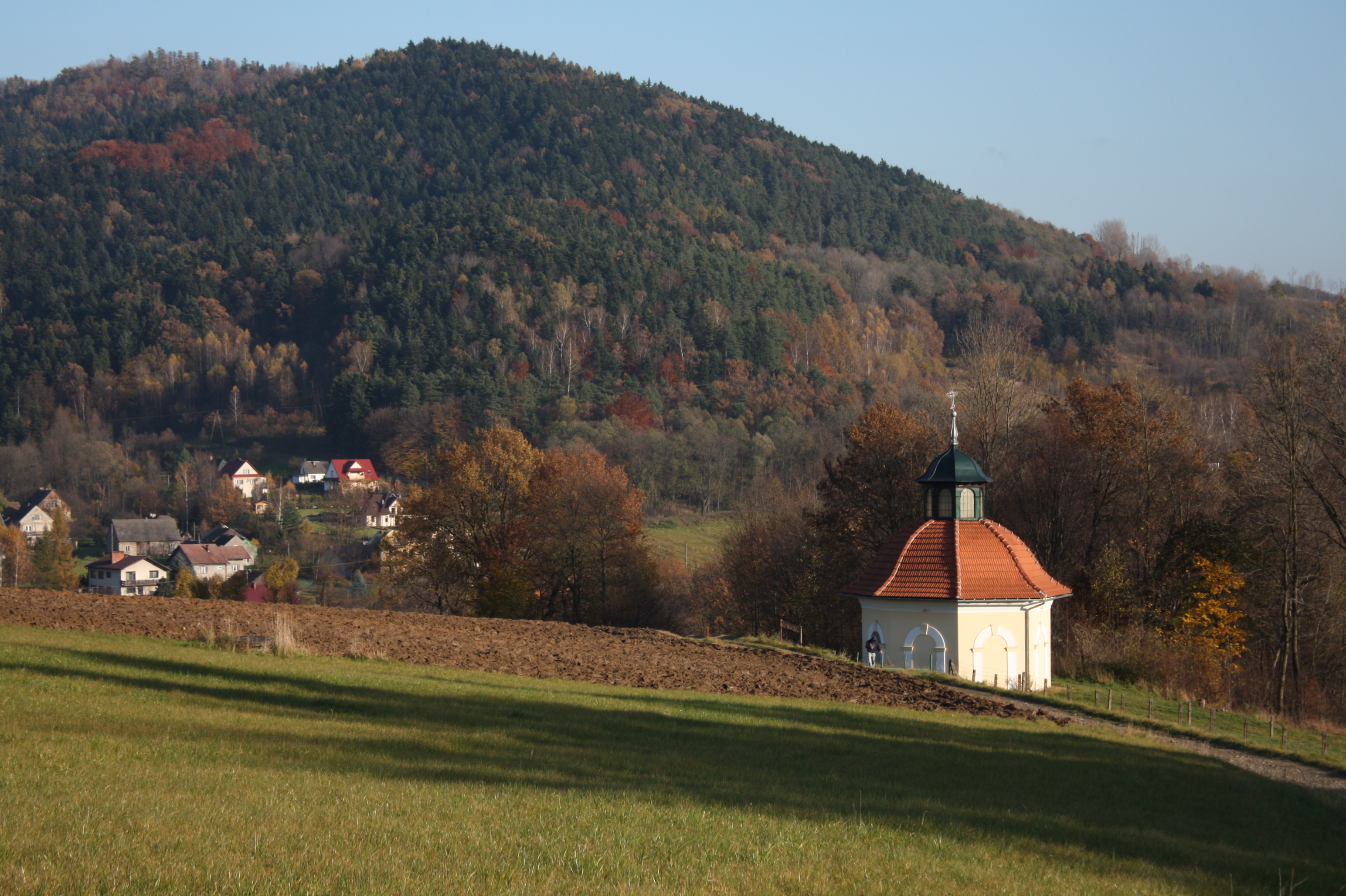
One of the chapels in the Kalwaria Zebrzydowska Park, Wieliczka Foothills

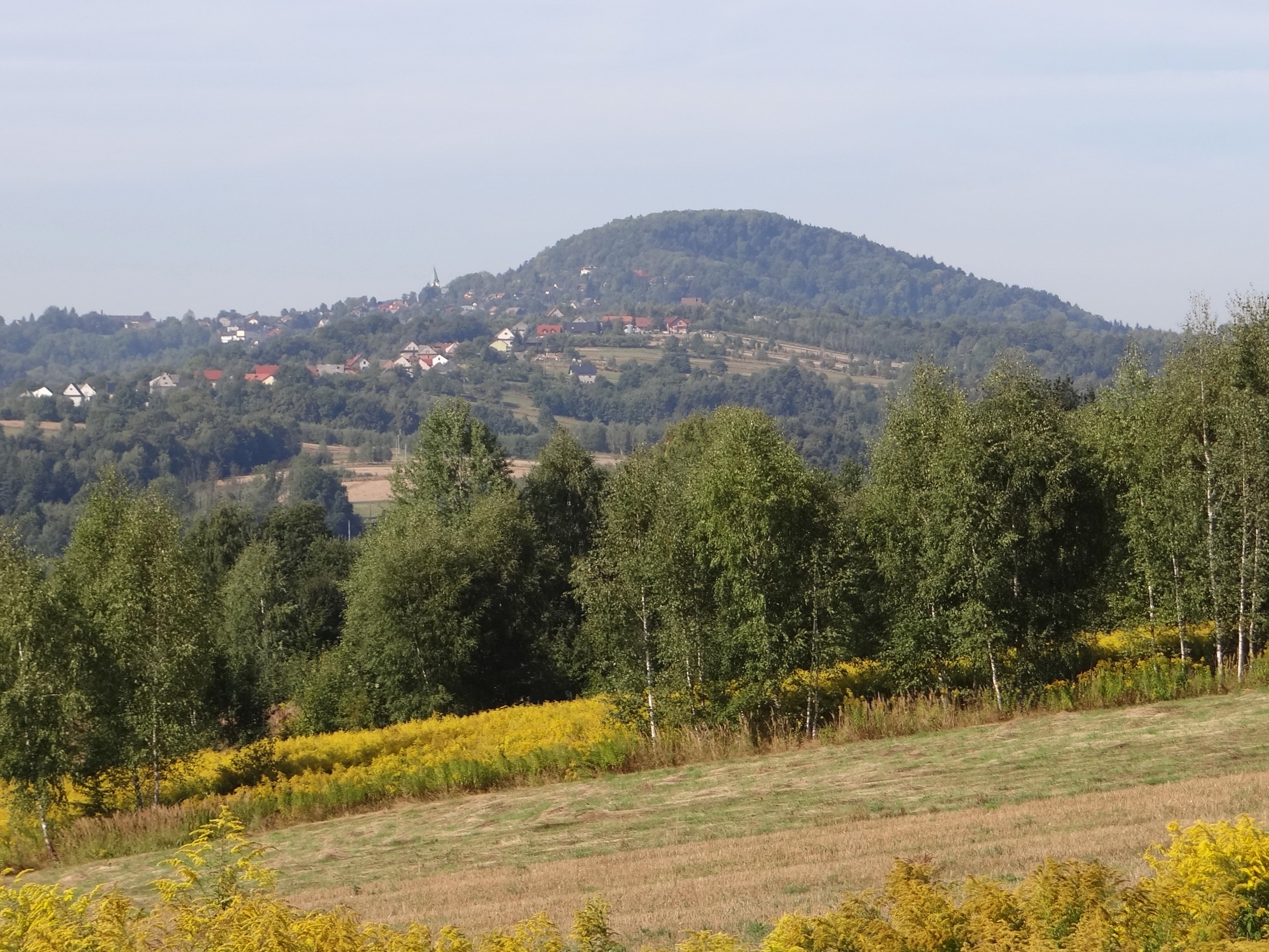
Lanckorona, Wieliczka Foothills

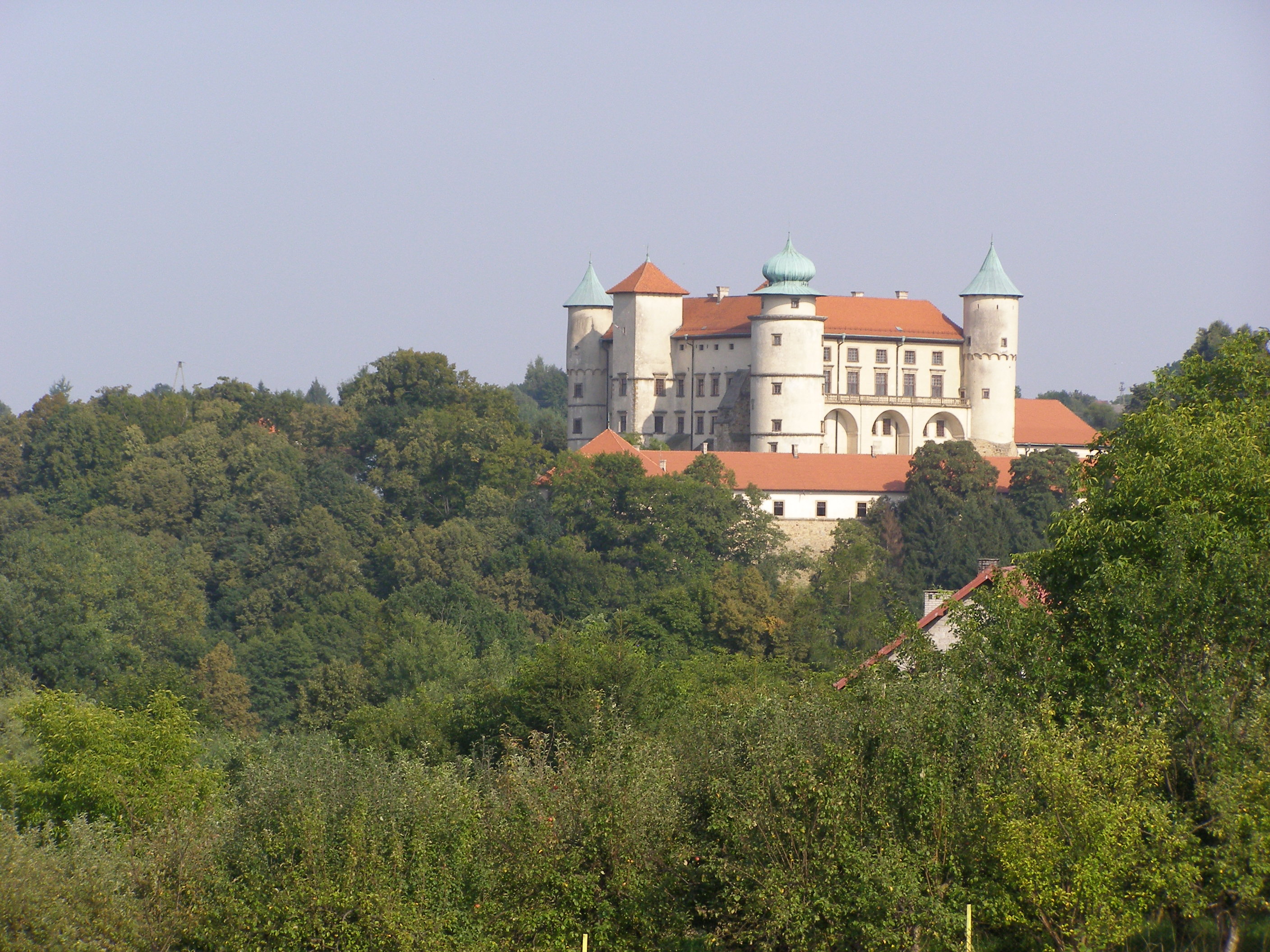
Nowy Wiśnicz Castle, Wiśnicz Foothills

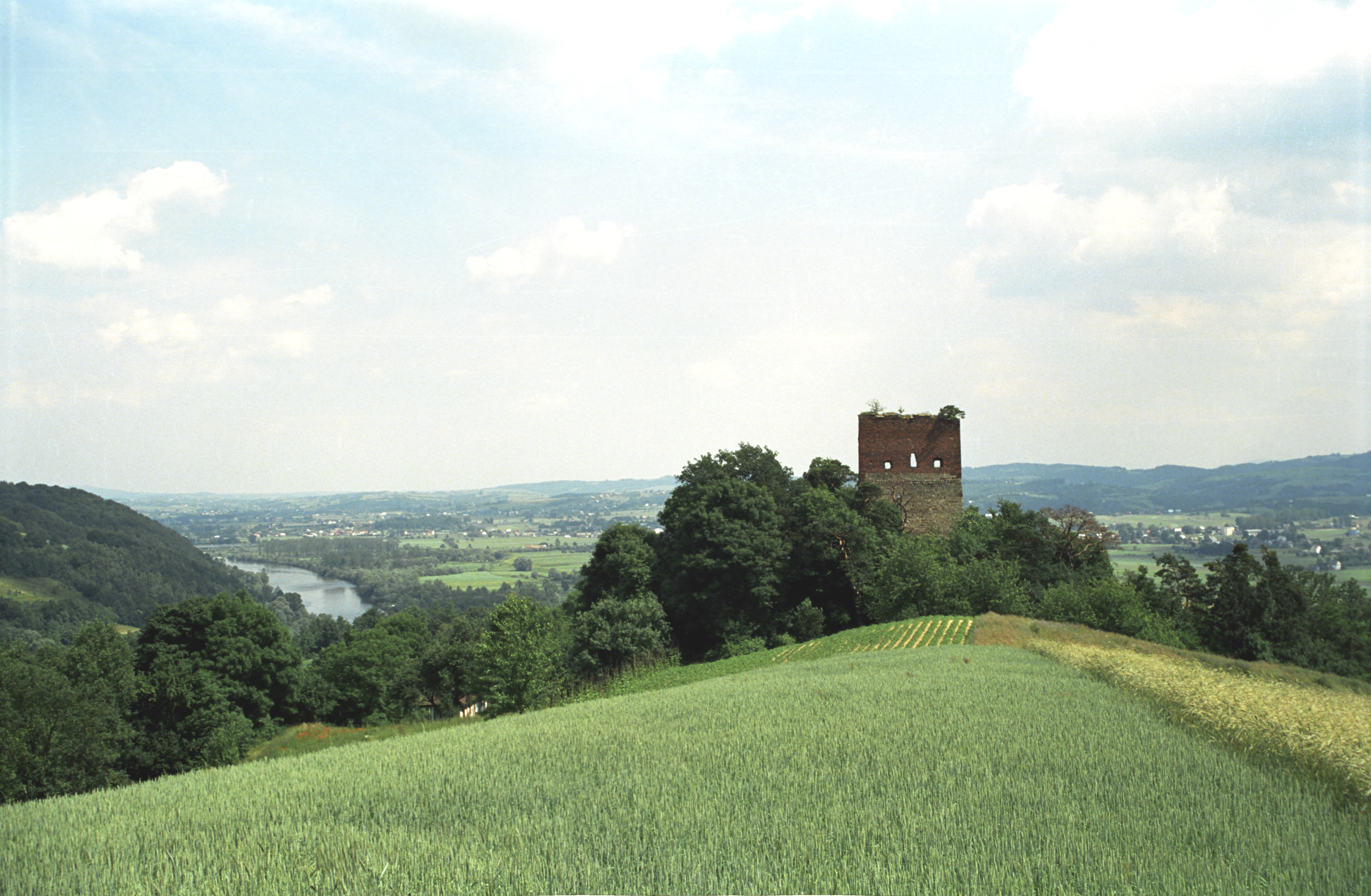
Melsztyn Castle, Wiśnicz Foothills

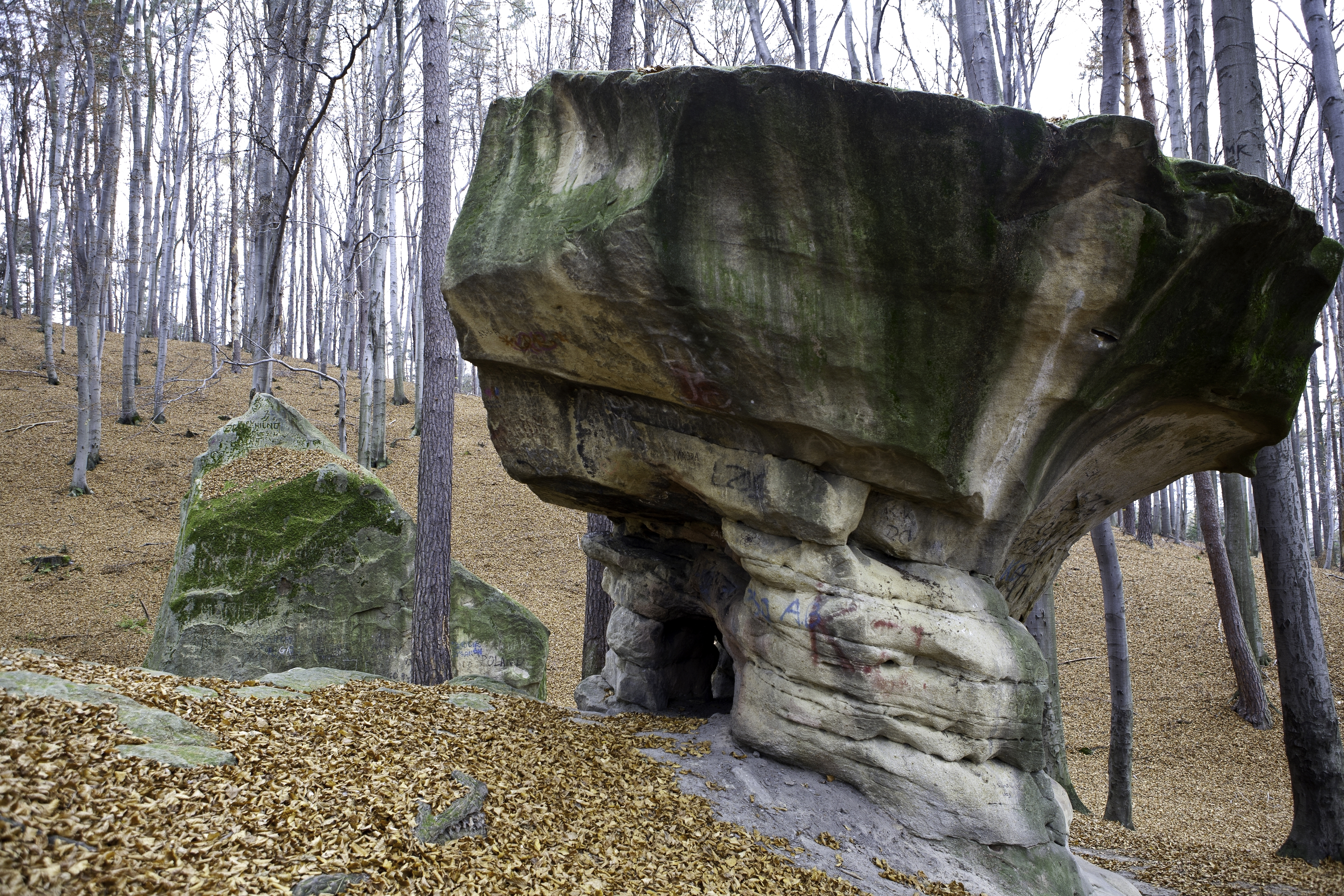
Nature reserve Kamień-Grzyb, Wiśnicz Foothills
