= Divisions of the Carpathians =

Categorization of the Carpathian mountains system

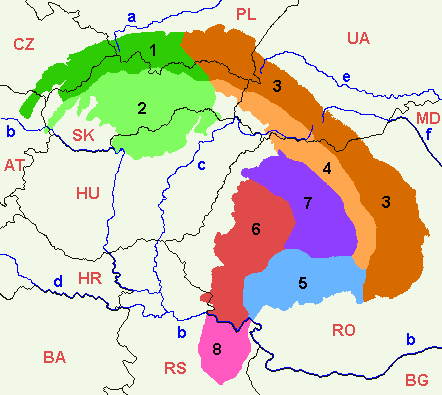
Map of the main divisions of the Carpathians.: 1. Outer Western Carpathians; 2. Inner Western Carpathians; 3. Outer Eastern Carpathians; 4. Inner Eastern Carpathians; 5. Southern Carpathians; 6. Western Romanian Carpathians; 7. Transylvanian Plateau; 8. Serbian Carpathians

Divisions of the Carpathians are a categorization of the Carpathian Mountains system.

Below is a detailed overview of the major subdivisions and ranges of the Carpathian Mountains. The Carpathians are a "subsystem" of a bigger Alps-Himalaya System that stretches from western Europe all the way to southern Asia, and are further divided into "provinces" and "subprovinces". The last level of the division, i.e. the actual mountain ranges and basins, is usually classified as "units". The main divisions are shown in the map on the right.

To generalize, there are three major provinces (regions): Western Carpathians, Eastern Carpathians, and the Southern Carpathians.

== Naming conventions ==
The division is largely (with many exceptions) undisputed at the lowest level (except for the Ukrainian part), but various divisions are given for the higher levels, especially for the penultimate level. A geomorphological division has been used as much as the data was available; other new physiogeographic divisions were used in other cases. Where the classification of a higher level "title" is known/sure, it is added at the end of the name in brackets, e.g. "(subprovince)".

Taxonomy

The names are also given in the language of the corresponding country and marked by the ISO 3166-1 alpha-2 country codes:

- AT=Austria
- CZ=Czech Republic
- HU=Hungary
- PL=Poland
- RO=Romania
- RS=Serbia
- SK=Slovakia
- UA=Ukraine

The most confusing and diverse is the classification of the Beskids, including the Western Beskids, the Central Beskids and the Eastern Beskids. Their geologic features are fairly distinct, but multiple traditions, languages, and nationalities have developed overlapping variants for the divisions and names of these ranges.

In Romania, it is usual to divide the Eastern Carpathians in Romanian territory into three formal groups (northern, central, southern), instead in Outer and Inner sections of Eastern Carpathians. The Romanian approach is shown by adding the following abbreviations to the names of units within Romania:

- MMB = Maramureș-Bukovinian Carpathians (Munții Carpați ai Maramureșului și Bucovinei)
- MMT = Moldavian-Transylvanian Carpathians (Munții Carpați Moldo-Transilvani)
- MC = Curvature Carpathians (Munții Carpați de Curbură)

A similar standard (grouping of outer and inner sections) is traditionally applied within broader use of the term "Wooded Carpathians", that encompasses all mountain ranges within the central section of Outer Eastern Carpathians, including Eastern Beskids with Polonynian Mountains, and also all mountains within the northern section of Inner Eastern Carpathians, including Vihorlat-Gutin Area and Maramureș-Rodna Area.

The Transylvanian Plateau is encircled by, and geologically a part of, the Carpathians. But it is not a mountainous region and its inclusion is disputed in some sources. Its features are included below.

The Serbian Carpathians are sometimes considered part of the Southern Carpathians (together with the Banat Mountains), sometimes not considered part of the Carpathians at all. They're included below.

The regions of Outer Subcarpathia lay outside the broad arc of the entire formation and are usually listed as part of the individual divisions of the Carpathian Mountains, i.e. of Western Carpathians, Eastern Carpathians, etc. With the difficulty of finding their exact subdivisions, they are given only as a list of the final units (mountains etc.) from the west to the east and south, in a separate listing at the end.

== Western Carpathians (province) ==
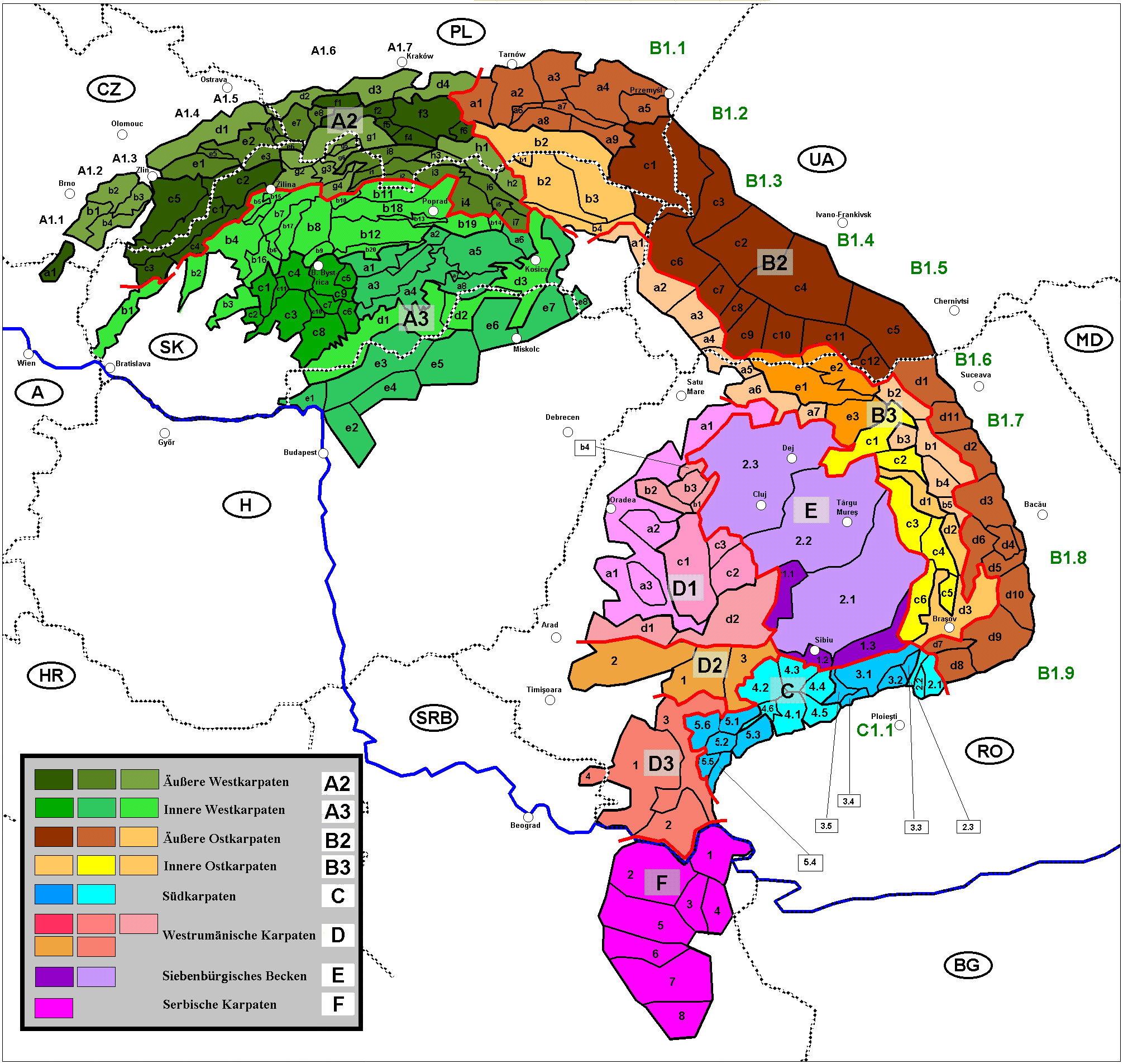
Geomorphological Structure of Carpathian

=== Outer Western Carpathians (subprovince) ===
==== South-Moravian Carpathians (CZ) / Austrian - South-Moravian Carpathians (AT) (area) ====
(CZ: Jihomoravské Karpaty, AT: Österreichisch-Südmährische Karpaten)

- Lower Austrian Inselberg Swell (AT: Leiser Berge, Niederösterreichische Inselbergschwelle) + Mikulov Highlands (CZ: Mikulovská vrchovina)
- Dyje-Svratka Vale (AT: Thaya-Schwarza Thalsenke, CZ: Dyjsko-svratecký úval)

==== Central Moravian Carpathians (CZ) (area) ====
(CZ: Středomoravské Karpaty)

- Ždánice Forest (Ždánický les)
- Litenčice Hills (Litenčická pahorkatina)
- Chřiby
- Kyjov Hills (Kyjovská pahorkatina)

==== Slovak-Moravian Carpathians (CZ/SK) (area) ====
(CZ/SK: Slovensko-moravské Karpaty)

- White Carpathians (CZ: Bílé Karpaty, SK: Biele Karpaty)
- Maple Mountains (Javorníky) (CZ+SK)
- Myjava Hills (SK: Myjavská pahorkatina)
- Váh Valley Land (SK: Považské podolie)
- Vizovice Highlands (CZ: Vizovická vrchovina)

==== West Beskidian Foothills (CZ / PL) (area) ====
West Beskidian Foothills, marked in red and labeled with D

(CZ: Západobeskydské podhůří, PL: Pogórze Zachodniobeskidzkie)

- Moravian-Silesian Foothills (PL: Pogórze Śląsko-Morawskie, CZ: Podbeskydská pahorkatina)
- Silesian Foothills (PL: Pogórze Śląskie)
- Wieliczka Foothills (PL: Pogórze Wielickie)
- Wiśnicz Foothills (PL: Pogórze Wiśnickie)

==== Western Beskids (CZ / SK / PL) (area) ====
Western section of Western Beskids, marked in red and labeled with E

Northern section of Western Beskids, marked in red and labeled with F

Eastern section of the Western Beskids, marked in red and labeled with H

(CZ: Západní Beskydy, SK: Západné Beskydy, PL: Beskidy Zachodnie)

Western section of the Western Beskids

- Hostýn-Vsetín Mountains (CZ: Hostýnsko-vsetínská hornatina)
- Moravian-Silesian Beskids (CZ: Moravskoslezské Beskydy, SK: Moravsko-sliezske Beskydy)
- Turzovka Highlands (SK: Turzovská vrchovina)
- Jablunkov Furrow (CZ: Jablunkovská brázda)
- Rožnov Furrow (CZ: Rožnovská brázda)
- Jablunkov Intermontane (SK: Jablunkovské medzihorie, CZ: Jablunkovské mezihoří)
- Silesian Beskids (PL: Beskid Śląski, CZ: Slezské Beskydy)
- Żywiec Basin (PL: Kotlina Żywiecka)

Northern section of the Western Beskids

- Little Beskids (Beskid Mały)
- Maków Beskids or Middle Beskids (Beskid Makowski or "Beskid Średni")
- Island Beskids (Beskid Wyspowy)
- Gorce
- (?)Rabka Basin (Kotlina Rabczańska)
- Sącz Basin (Kotlina Sądecka)

Eastern section of the Western Beskids (in Slovak terminology: Eastern Beskids, SK: Východné Beskydy)

- Beskid Sądecki (PL: Beskid Sądecki) + Ľubovňa Highlands (SK: Ľubovnianska vrchovina)
- Čergov (SK) + Czerchów Mountains (PL: Góry Czerchowskie)
- Pieniny (often considered part of the Podhôľno-magurská oblasť in non-geomorphological systems)

Central section of the Western Beskids (in Slovak terminology: Central Beskids, SK: Stredné Beskydy)

Central section of the Western Beskids, marked in red and labeled with G

- Orava Beskids (SK: Oravské Beskydy) + Żywiec Beskids (PL: Beskid Żywiecki) (the older SK equivalent of Beskid Zywiecki is "Slovenské Beskydy"- Slovak Beskids or "Kysucko-oravské Beskydy"- Kysuce-Orava Beskids; the older polish equivalent is "Beskid Wysoki" - High Beskids)
- Kysuce Beskids (SK: Kysucké Beskydy) +Żywiec Beskids (PL: Beskid Żywiecki) (the older SK equivalent of Beskid Zywiecki is "Slovenské Beskydy" or "Kysucko-oravské Beskydy"; the older polish equivalent is "Beskid Wysoki" - High Beskids)
- Kysuce Highlands (SK: Kysucká vrchovina)
- Orava Magura (SK: Oravská Magura)
- Orava Highlands (SK: Oravská vrchovina)
- Sub-Beskidian Furrow (SK: Podbeskydská brázda)
- Sub-Beskidian Highlands (SK: Podbeskydská vrchovina)

==== Podhale-Magura Area (SK)/ Orava-Podhale Depression (PL) (area) ====
Podhale-Magura Area, marked in red and labeled withD I

(SK: Podhôľno-magurská oblasť, PL: Obniżenie Orawsko-Podhalańskie)

- Skorušina Mountains (SK: Skorušinské vrchy) + Spiš-Gubałówka Highlands (PL: Pogórze Spisko-Gubałowskie)
- Sub-Tatra Trench (SK: Podtatranská brázda, PL: Rów Podtatrzański)
- Spiš Magura (SK: Spišská Magura) + Spiš-Gubałówka Highlands (PL: Pogórze Spisko-Gubałowskie)
- Levoča Mountains (SK: Levočské vrchy)
- Bachureň (SK)
- Spiš-Šariš Intermontane (SK: Spišsko-šarišské medzihorie)
- Šariš Highlands (SK: Šarišská vrchovina)
- Orava Basin (SK: Oravská kotlina) + Orava-Nowy Targ Basin (PL: Kotlina Orawsko-Nowotarska)

=== Inner Western Carpathians (subprovince) ===
==== Slovak Ore Mountains (SK) (area) ====
Slovak: Slovenské rudohorie

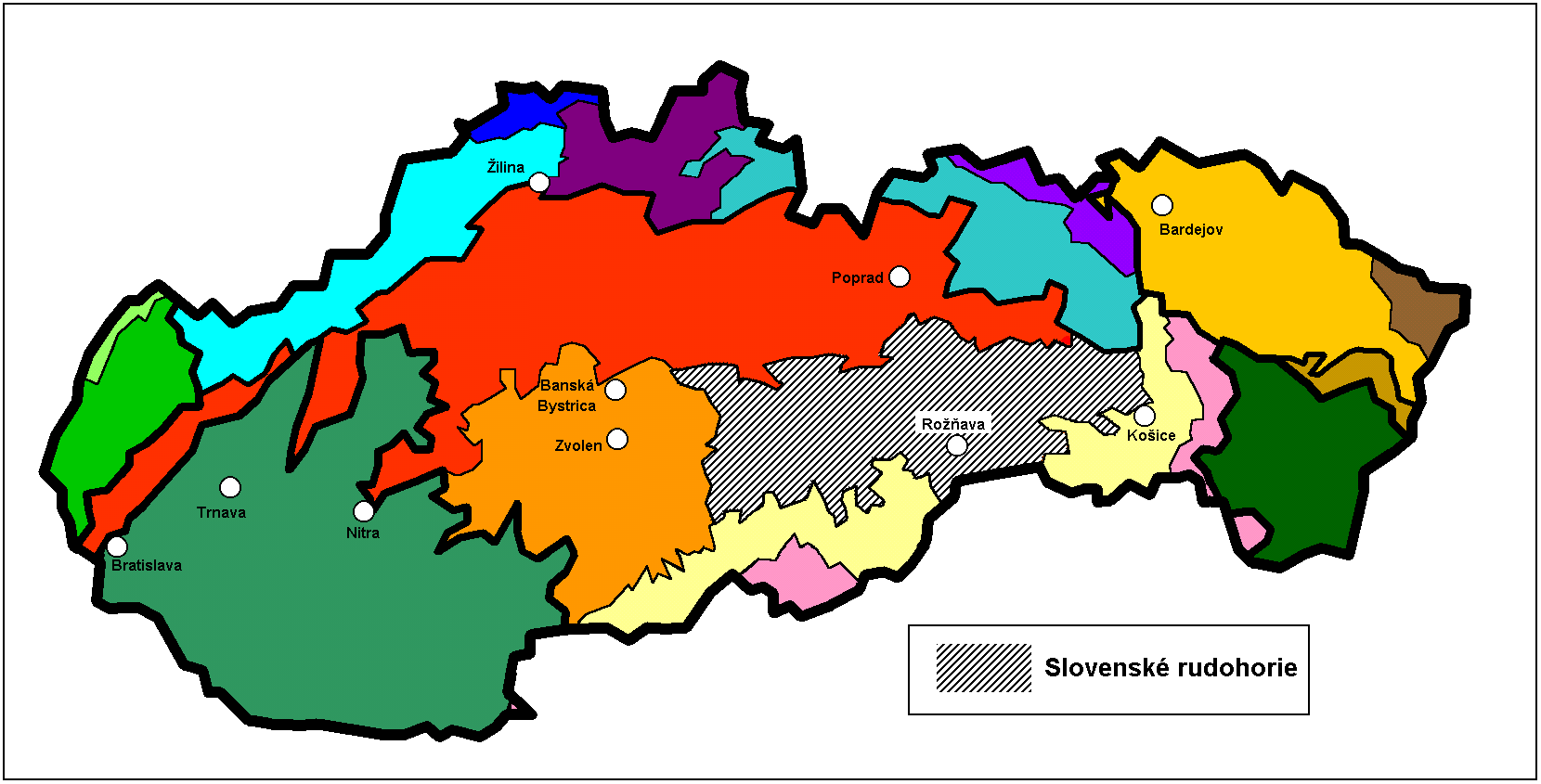
The Slovak Ore Mountains within Slovakia in grey

- Vepor Mountains (Veporské vrchy)
- Spiš-Gemer Karst (Spišsko-gemerský kras)
- Stolica Mountains (Stolické vrchy)
- Revúca Highlands (Revúcka vrchovina)
- Volovec Mountains (Volovské vrchy)
- Black Mountain (Čierna hora)
- Rožňava Basin (Rožňavská kotlina)
- Slovak Karst (Slovenský kras) and Aggtelek Karst (Hungarian: Aggteleki-karszt; lies in northern Hungary)

==== Fatra-Tatra Area (SK/PL/AT) * (area) ====
Slovak:Fatransko-tatranská oblasť

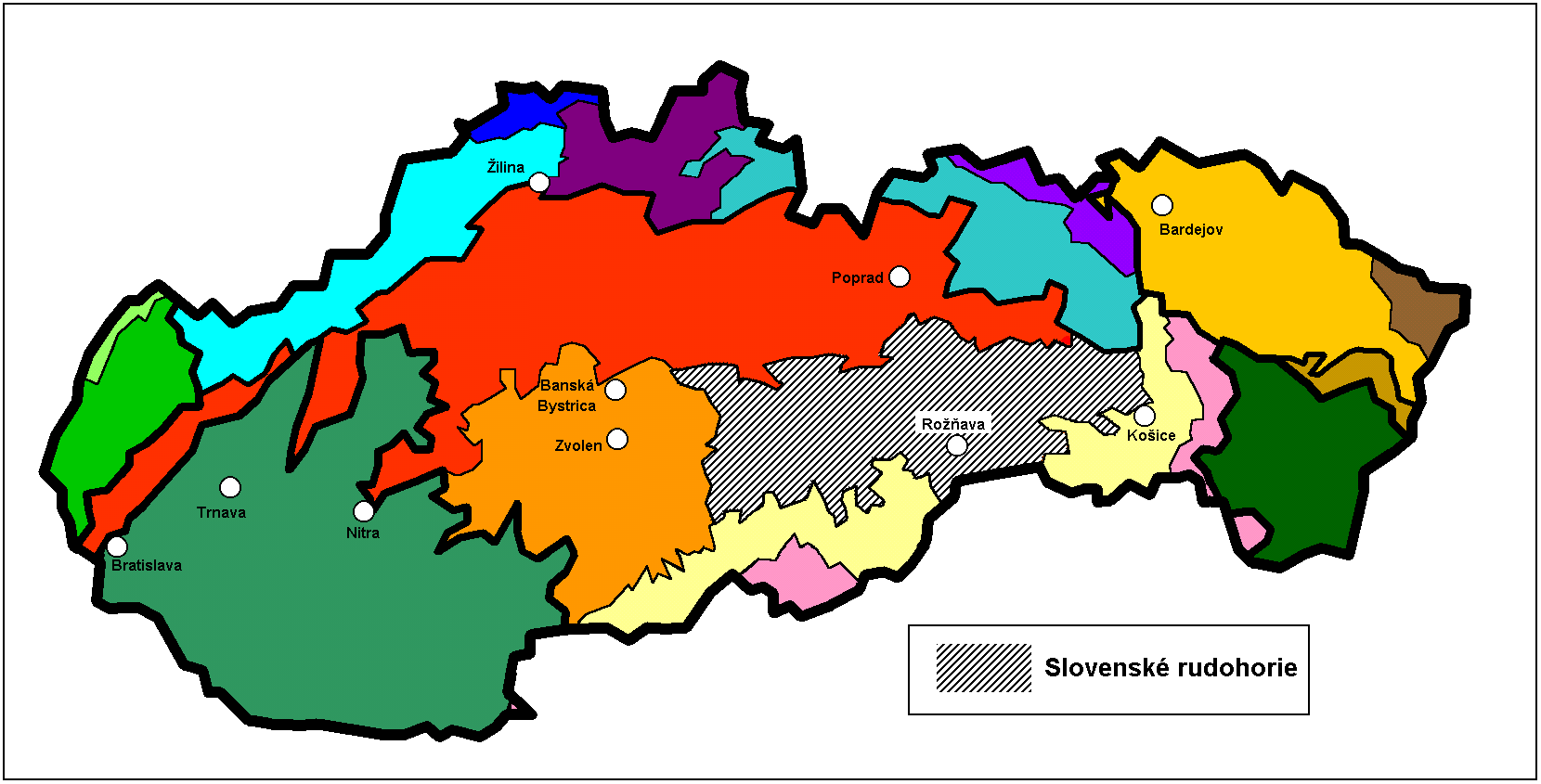
Fatra-Tatra area within Slovakia in red

- Little Carpathians (SK: Malé Karpaty) + Hainburg Mountains (AT: Hainburger Berge)
- Považský Inovec
- Tribeč
- Strážov Mountains (Strážovské vrchy)
- Súľov Mountains (Súľovské vrchy)
- Žiar
- Lesser Fatra (Malá Fatra)
- Greater Fatra (Veľká Fatra)
- Staré Hory Mountains (Starohorské vrchy)
- Choč Mountains (Chočské vrchy)
- Western Tatras
- Eastern Tatras
- Low Tatras (Nízke Tatry)
- Kozie chrbty (literally: Goat Ridges)
- Branisko
- Žilina Basin (Žilinská kotlina)
- Upper Nitra Basin (Hornonitrianska kotlina)
- Turiec Basin (Turčianska kotlina)
- Podtatranská kotlina (Sub-Tatra Basin)
- Hornád Basin (Hornádska kotlina)
- Horehronské podolie

==== Slovak Central Mountains (Slovenské stredohorie) (SK) (area) ====
SK: Slovenské stredohorie, EN: Slovak mid-mountainous region

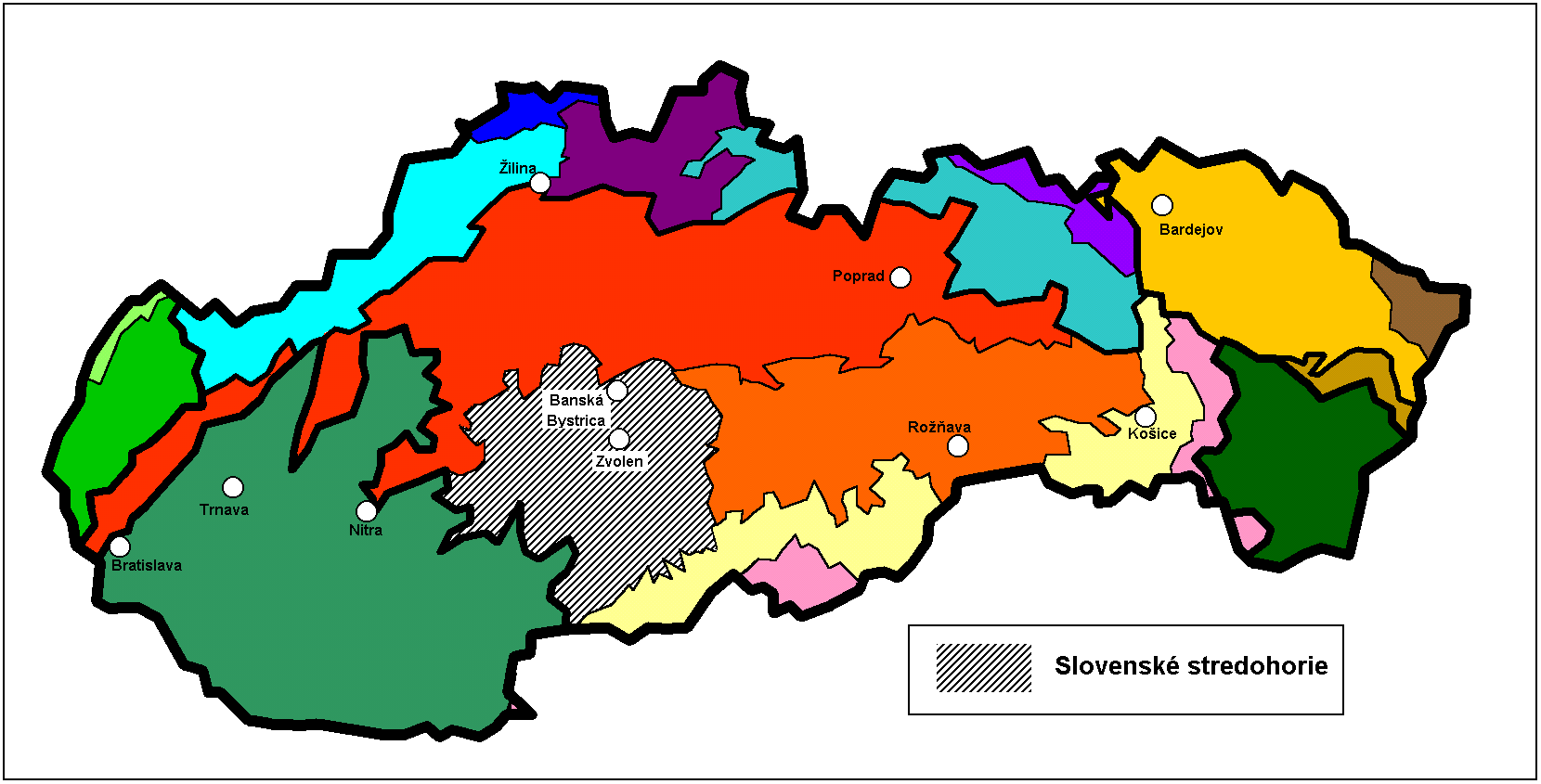
Location of Slovak mid-mountainous region in Slovakia (in gray)

- Vtacnik Mountains (Vtáčnik)
- Pohronský Inovec
- Štiavnica Mountains (Štiavnické vrchy)
- Kremnica Mountains (Kremnické vrchy)
- Poľana
- Ostrôžky
- Javorie
- Krupina Plain (Krupinská planina)
- Zvolen Basin (Zvolenská kotlina)
- Pliešovce Basin (Pliešovská kotlina)
- Žiar Basin (Žiarska kotlina)

==== Lučenec-Košice Depression (SK/HU) (area) ====
SK: Lučensko-košická zníženina

- Southern Slovak Basin (SK: Juhoslovenská kotlina) + Central Ipoly Basin (HU: Középső-Ipoly-völgy) + Borsod Hills (HU: Borsodi-dombság)
- Bodva Hills (SK: Bodvianska pahorkatina)
- Košice Basin (SK: Košická kotlina) + Hernád-Valley Basin (HU: Hernád-völgy)

==== Mátra-Slanec Area (SK) /North Hungarian Mountains (HU) (area) ====
SK: Matransko-slanská oblasť, HU: Északi-középhegység

- Börzsöny Mountains (HU: Börzsöny-hegység, literally: Logwood Mountains) + Burda (SK)
- Gödöllő Hills (HU: Gödöllői-dombság)
- Cerová vrchovina (SK; Cerová Highlands) + Cserhát (HU: Cserhát)
- Mátra (HU: Mátra)
- Bükk (HU: Bükk – literally Beech Mountains)
- Cserehát Hills (HU: Cserehát)
- Slanec Mountains (SK: Slanské vrchy) + Zemplén Mountains (HU: Zempléni-hegység, also Tokaji-hegység/Tokaj Mountains)
- Zemplín Mountains (SK, Zemplínske vrchy)

== Eastern Carpathians (province) ==
Clarification: In Ukraine sometimes is denoted as "Eastern Carpathians" only the part basically on their territory (i.e.to the north of the Prislop Pass), while in Romania sometimes use to call "Eastern Carpathians" (Carpații Orientali) only the other part, which lies on their territory (i.e. from the Ukrainian border or from the Prislop Pass to the south). In some Polish classifications, Central Beskids and Central Beskidian Piedmont belongs to Western Carpathians province and Outer Western Carpathians subprovince.

=== Outer Eastern Carpathians (subprovince) ===
==== Central Beskidian Piedmont (PL)*** ====
Central Beskidian Piedmont, marked in red and labeled with A

PL: Pogórze Środkowobeskidzkie

- Rożnów Piedmont (PL: Pogórze Rożnowskie)
- Ciężkowice Piedmont (PL: Pogórze Ciężkowickie)
- Strzyżów Piedmont (PL: Pogórze Strzyżowskie)
- Dynów Piedmont (PL: Pogórze Dynowskie)
- Przemyśl Piedmont (PL: Pogórze Przemyskie)
- Gorlice Depression (PL: Obniżenie Gorlickie)
- Jasło-Krosno Basin (PL: Kotlina Jasielsko-Krośnieńska)
- Jasło Piedmont (PL: Pogórze Jasielskie)
- Bukowsko Piedmont (PL: Pogórze Bukowskie)

==== Central Beskids (area) ====
Central Beskids, marked in red and labeled with B

PL: Beskidy Środkowe (in Slovak terminology: Lower Beskids, SK: Nízke Beskydy)

- Busov (SK)
- Ondava Highlands (SK: Ondavská vrchovina)
- Low Beskid (PL: Beskid Niski) + Laborec Highlands (SK: Laborecká vrchovina)
- Central Beskidian Piedmont (SK: Beskydské predhorie)

==== Eastern Beskids (area) ====
Eastern Beskids, marked in red and labeled with C

PL: Beskidy Wschodnie; UA: Східні Бескиди. There are several variants of names and divisions of these ranges, that include the southeastern corner of Poland, far northeastern corner of Slovakia, and all of the Ukrainian Carpathians. They are commonly divided into two parallel ridges: Wooded Beskids and Polonynian Beskids.

Wooded Beskids (PL: Beskidy Lesiste; UA: Лісисті Бескиди):

- Bieszczady Mountains (PL: Bieszczady; UK: Бещади) → c1
  - Western Bieszczady (Polish: Bieszczady Zachodnie; Ukrainian: Західні Бещади) mainly in Poland and Slovakia, including the Bukovec Mountains (Slovak: Bukovské vrchy)
  - Eastern Bieszczady (Polish: Bieszczady Wschodnie; Ukrainian: Східні Бещади), mainly in Ukraine
- Sanok-Turka Mountains (PL: Góry Sanocko-Turczańskie; UK: Верхньодністровські Бескиди / Verkhnodnistrovski Beskydy) → c3
- Skole Beskids (PL: Beskidy Skolskie; UA: Сколівські Бескиди) → c2
- Gorgany (PL: Gorgany; UA: Ґорґани) → c4
- Pokuttia-Bucovina Beskids (PL: Beskidy Pokucko-Bukowińskie; UA: Покутсько-Буковинські Карпати / Pokutsko-Bukovinski Karpaty) → c5

Polonynian Beskids (PL: Beskidy Połonińskie; UA: Полонинські Бескиди; SK: Poloniny):

- Smooth Polonyna (PL: Połonina Równa; UK: Полонина Рівна) → c6
- Polonyna Borzhava (PL: Połonina Borżawska; UK: Полонина Боржава) → c7
- Polonyna Kuk (PL: Połonina Kuk; UK: Полонина Кук) → c8
- Red Polonyna (PL: Połonina Czerwona; UK: Полонина Красна)→ c9
- Svydovets (PL: Świdowiec; UK: Свидівець) → c10
- Chornohora (PL: Czarnohora; UK: Чорногора) → c11
- Hrynyavy Mountains (PL: Połoniny Hryniawskie; UK: Гриняви) → c12

==== Moldavian-Muntenian Carpathians ====
Moldavian-Muntenian Carpathians, marked in red and labeled with D

- Suhard Mountains (RO: Munții Suhard) MMB
- Ridges of Bukovina (RO: Obcinele Bucovinei), i.e. Obcina Feredeului (Feredeu Ridge), Obcina Mestecăniș (Mestecăniș Ridge) and Obcina Mare (Great Ridge) MMB
- Stânișoara Mountains (RO: Munții Stânișoarei, Masivul Ceahlău) MMT
- Trotuș Mountains (RO: Munții Trotușului, i.e. Munții Tarcăului, Munții Goșmanului, Munții Berzunț, Munții Nemira) MMT
- Vrancea Mountains (RO: Munții Vrancei) MC
- Buzău Mountains (RO: Munții Buzăului) MC
- Teleajen-Doftana Mountains (RO: Munții Teleajenului și Doftanei, i.e. Masivul Ciucaș-Muntele Roșu, Munții Grohotiș, Munții Baiului, Munții Gârbovei) MC

=== Inner Eastern Carpathians (subprovince) ===
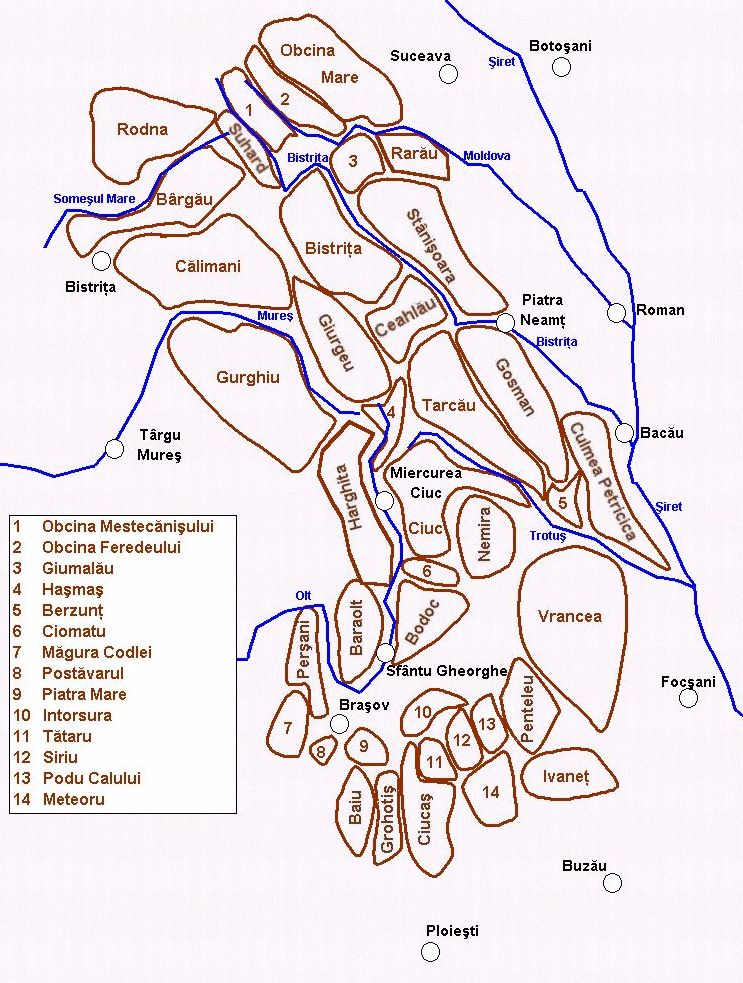
Map of Inner Eastern and Outer Eastern Carpathians (RO: Carpații Orientali) within Romania

==== Vihorlat-Gutin Area ====
SK: Vihorlatsko-gutínska oblasť, UA: Вигорлат-Гутинський хребет

- Vihorlat Mountains (SK: Vihorlatské vrchy) + Vyhorliat (UA: Вигорлат) → (B3a1)
- Makovytsia (UA: Маковиця) → (B3a2)
- Velikyi Dil (UA: Великий Діл) → (B3a3)
- Tupyi (UA: Тупий) → (B3a4)
- Oaș Mountains (RO: Munții Oașului, UA: Оаш гори) and Oaș Lowland (RO: Depresiunea Oașului) MMB → (B3a5)
- Gutin Mountains (RO: Munții Gutâiului, UA: Гутинський масив) MMB → (B3a6)
- Țibleș Mountains (RO: Munții Țibleșului) MMB → (B3a7)

==== Maramureș-Rodna Area ====
- Maramureș Lowland (RO: Depresiunea Maramureșului, UA: Мармароська улоговина) MMB → (B3e1)
- Maramureș Mountains (RO: Munții Maramureșului, UA: Мармароський масив) MMB → (B3e2)
- Rodna Mountains (RO: Munții Rodnei, UA: Родна гори) MMB → (B3e3)

==== Bistrița Mountains (RO) ====
RO: Munții Bistriței

- Bistrița Mountains (Munții Bistriței) sensu stricto, i.e. Pietrosul Massif (Masivul Pietrosul; literally: Rocky Massif) + Budacul Massif (Masivul Budacul) + Ceahlău Massif (Masivul Ceahlău), the latter being considered a separate range sometimes, MMT
- Mestecăniș Ridge (Obcina Mestecăniș) MMB
- Dorna Depression (Depresiunea Dornei) MMB
- Giumalău-Rarău Mountains (Munții Giumalău-Rarău) MMB
- Giurgeu Mountains (Munții Giurgeului) MMT
- Hășmaș Mountains (Munții Hășmașu Mare) MMT

==== Căliman-Harghita Mountains (RO) ====
RO: Munții Căliman-Harghita

- Bârgău Mountains (Munții Bârgăului) MMT
- Călimani Mountains (Munții Călimani) MMT
- Ciuc Mountains (Munții Ciucului) MMT
- Gurghiu Mountains (Munții Gurghiului) MMT
- Harghita Mountains (Munții Harghita) MMT
- Baraolt Mountains (Munții Baraolt) MMT
- Perșani Mountains (Munții Perșani) MMT

==== Giurgeu-Brașov Depression (RO) ====
RO: Depresiunea Giurgeu-Brașovului

- Giurgeu Depression (Depresiunea Giurgeului) MMT
- Ciuc Depression (Depresiunea Ciucului) MMT
- Brașov Depression (Depresiunea Brașovului) MC
- Piatra Mare Mountains MC
- Postăvarul Massif MC

== Southern Carpathians (RO) (province) ==
=== Bucegi Mountains Group ===
RO: Grupa Munții Bucegi

- Bucegi Mountains (Munții Bucegi)
- Leaotă Mountains (Munții Leaotă)
- Rucăr-Bran Pass (Culoarul Rucăr-Bran)

=== Făgăraș Mountains group ===
RO: Grupa Munții Făgărașului

- Făgăraș Mountains (Munții Făgărașului)
- Iezer Mountains (Munții Iezer; literally:Mountains of the Deep Lake)
- Piatra Craiului (literally: Rock of the King)
- Cozia Mountains (Munții Cozia)
- Loviște Depression (Depresiunea Loviștei)

=== Parâng Mountains group ===
RO: Grupa Munții Parângului

- Parâng Mountains (Munții Parângului)
- Șureanu Mountains (Munții Șureanu/M. Sebeșului)
- Cindrel Mountains (Munții Cindrel/M. Cibinului)
- Lotru Mountains (Munții Lotrului; literally: Mountains of the Thief)
- Căpățână Mountains (Munții Căpățânii; literally: Mountains of the Skull)
- Petroșani Depression (Depresiunea Petroșani)

=== Retezat-Godeanu Mountains group ===
RO: Grupa Munții Retezat-Godeanu

- Retezat Mountains (Munții Retezat; literally: Hewed Mountains)
- Godeanu Mountains (Munții Godeanu)
- Vâlcan Mountains (Munții Vâlcanului)
- Mehedinți Mountains (Munții Mehendinți)
- Cerna Mountains (Munții Cernei)
- Țarcu Mountains (Munții Țarcu; literally: Pen Mountains)

== Western Romanian Carpathians (RO) ==
RO: Carpații Occidentali or Carpații Apuseni or Carpații de Apus. The term Bihor Massif is sometimes used for the Apuseni Mountains and Poiana Ruscă.

=== Apuseni Mountains (Munții Apuseni) ===
Criș Mountains (Munții Criș) :

- Criș Hills (Dealurile Crișene), incl. Beiuș Depression (Depresiunea Beiuș), Vad Depression (Depresiunea Vad)
- Pădurea Craiului Mountains (literally:Forest of the King)
- Codru-Moma Mountains (Munții Codru-Moma)

Seș-Meseș Mountains (Munții Seș-Meseșului):

- Meseș Mountains (Munții Meseșului)
- Seș Mountain (Muntele Seș)
- Șimleu Depression (Depresiunea Șimleu), often considered part of the Transylvanian Basin-Podișul Someșan
- Șimleu Mountains (Munții Șimleu), often considered part of the Transylvanian Basin-Podișul Someșan

Bihor Massif (Masivul Bihor):

- Bihor Mountains (Munții Bihorului)
- Great Mountain (Muntele Mare)
- Gilău Mountains (Munții Gilăului)

Mureș Mountains (Munții Mureșului):

- Zarand Mountains (Munții Zarandului)
- Metalliferous Mountains (Munții Metaliferi), incl. Trascău Mountains (Munții Trascăului)

=== Poiana Ruscă Mountains ===
RO: Munții Poiana Ruscă

(Note: sometimes considered part of the Southern Carpathians)

- Poiana Ruscă (literally: Ruscă Meadows)
- Lipova Plateau (Podișul Lipovei)
- Bega-Timiș Groove (Culoarul Bega-Timiș)
- Orăștie Groove (Culoarul Orăștiei), incl. Hațeg Depression (Depresiunea Hațegului)

=== Banat Mountains ===
RO: Munții Banatului

(Note: sometimes considered part of the Southern Carpathians)

- Banat Mountains (Munții Banatului) sensu stricto, i.e. Semenic Mountains (Munții Semenic), Locva Mountains (Munții Locvei), Anina Mountains (Munții Aninei) and Dognecea Mountains (Munții Dognecei)
- Almăj Mountains (Munții Almăjului)
- Timiș-Cerna Gap (Culoarul Timiș-Cerna), incl. Almăj Depression (Depresiunea Almăj)
- Caraș Hills (Dealurile Carașului)

== Transylvanian Plateau (RO) ==
RO: Depresiunea Transilvaniei, i.e. Transylvanian Depression. Some authors do not consider it to be part of the Carpathians.

- Mureș-Turda Depression (Depresiunea Mureș-Turda)
- Sibiu Depression (Depresiunea Sibiului)
- Făgăraș Depression (Depresiunea Făgărașului)

Transylvanian Plateau (Podișul Transilvaniei):

- Târnava Plateau (Podișul Târnavelor), incl. Hârtibaci Plateau (Podișul Hârtibaciului) and Secașe Plateau (Podișul Secașelor)
- Transylvanian Plain (Câmpia Transilvaniei), or Transylvanian Plateau (Podișul Transivan(iei)) sensu stricto
- Someș Plateau (Podișul Someșan or Podișul Someșelor)

== Serbian Carpathians (RS) ==
Serbian: Karpatske planine, i.e. "Carpathian Mountains". Sometimes considered part of the Southern Carpathians (together with the Banat Mountains), sometimes not considered part of the Carpathians at all.

- Miroč
- Homolje mountains (Homoljske planine)
- Veliki Krš
- Mali Krš
- Deli Jovan
- Beljanica (Beljanica planina)
- Kučaj (Kučajske planine)
- Rtanj (Rtanj planina)
- Ozren
- Devica

== Outer Subcarpathian regions (subprovince) ==
The Outer Subcarpathian regions are divided into Western, Northern, etc. and are usually treated as part of the individual parts of the Carpathian Mountains, i.e. of Western Carpathians, Eastern Carpathians, etc. Since, however, it was impossible to find their exact subdivision, they are given only as a list of the final units (mountains, etc.) from the west to the east and south here:

- Weinviertel Foothills (DE: Weinviertler Hügelland; CZ: Weinviertelská pahorkatina; PL: Pogórze Weinviertel) + Dyje-Svratka Valley (DE: Thaya-Schwarza-Talsenke; CZ: Dyjsko-svratecký úval) → A1.1
- Vyškov Gate (CZ: Vyškovská brána) → A1.2
- Upper Morava Valley (CZ: Hornomoravský úval) → A1.3
- Moravian Gate (CZ: Moravská brána) → A1.4
- Ostrava Basin (CZ: Ostravská pánev, PL: Kotlina Ostrawska) → A1.5
- Oświęcim Basin (PL: Kotlina Oświęcimska) → A1.6
- Kraków Gate (PL: Brama Krakowska) → A1.7
- Sandomierz Basin (PL: Kotlina Sandomierska) + San-Dniester Plain (PL: Płaskowyż Sańsko-Dniestrzański; UA: Сянсько-Дністровська рівнина) → B1.1
- Upper Dniester Valley (UA: Верхньодністровська улоговина) → B1.2
- Drohobych Highlands (PL: Wysoczyzna Drohobycka; UA: Дрогобицька височина) → B1.3
- Dniester Plain (UA: Придністровська рівнина) → B1.4
- Pokutian Upland (UA: Покутська височина) → B1.5
- Bukovinian Highlands (UA: Буковинське Прикарпаття; RO: Podișul Bucovinei) + Suceava Plateau (RO: Podișul Sucevei) → B1.6
- Moldavia-Siret Groove (RO: Culoarul Moldova-Siret) → B1.7
- Moldavian Subcarpathians (RO: Subcarpații Moldovei) → B1.8
- Muntenian Subcarpathians (RO: Subcarpații Munteniei) → B1.9
- Getic Subcarpathians (RO: Subcarpații Getici) + Getic Plateau (RO: Podișul Getic) → C1.1
