= Prykarpattia =

Region of Western Ukraine

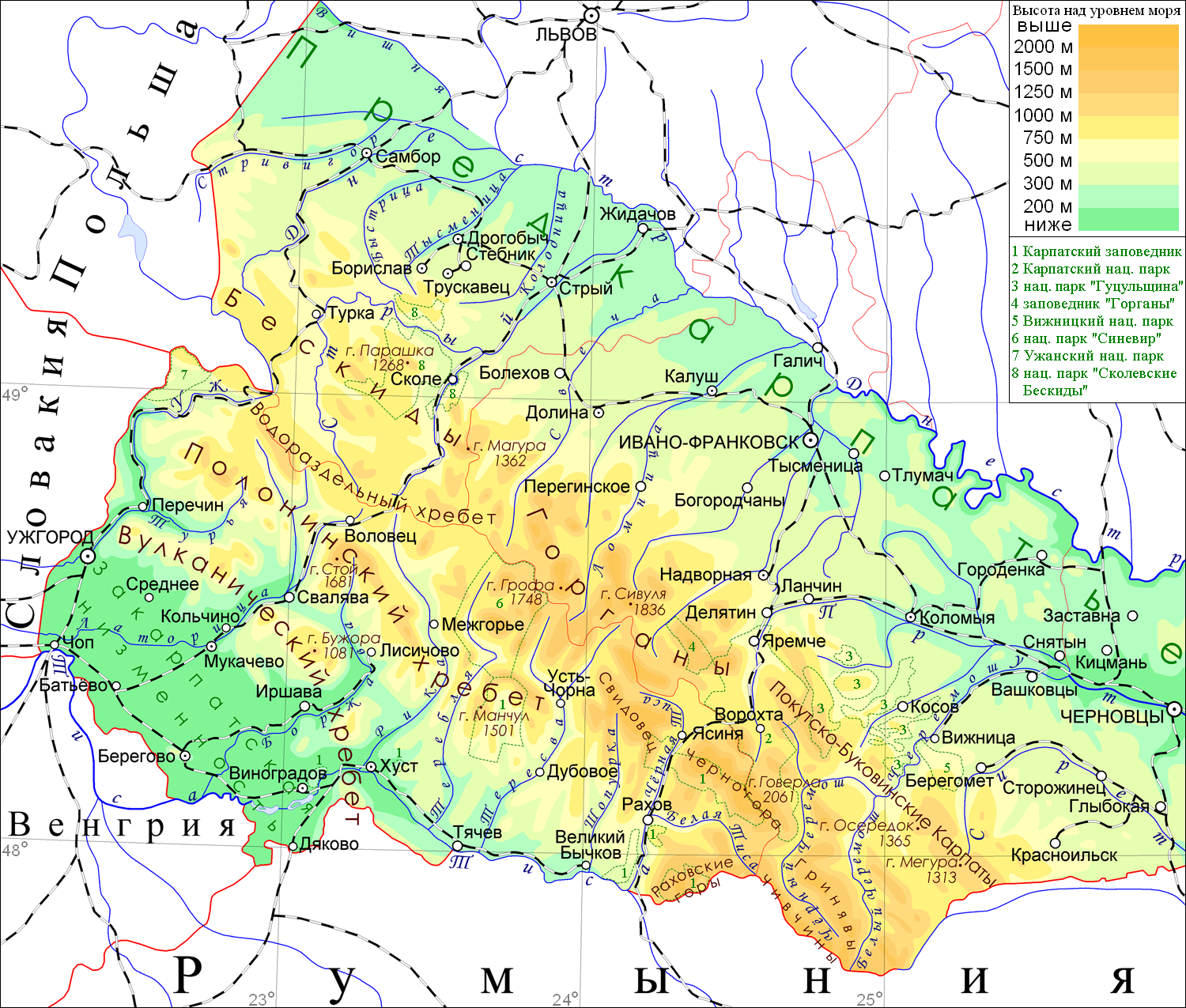
Ukrainian Carpathians, dividing Prykarpattia (on north-eastern side) from Zakarpattia (on south-western side)

Prykarpattia (Ukrainian: Прикарпаття, Ukrainian pronunciation: [prekɐrˈpɑtʲːɐ]), also known as Subcarpathia (Підкарпаття, Pidkarpattia) is a Ukrainian term for Ciscarpathia, a physical geographical region for the northeastern Carpathian foothills.

Located at the outer foot of the Eastern Carpathian Mountains (Outer Subcarpathia), consisting of today's Ivano-Frankivsk Oblast (predominantly) and Lviv Oblast (partially), it forms part of the larger historic region of Galicia (Haliczyna), which before the 14th century was a part of the Kingdom of Galicia–Volhynia. Along with the Lviv, Chernivtsi and Zakarpattia regions, Prykarpattia is a component of the Carpathian Euroregion.

== History ==
Initially a part of Kievan Rus' and one of its successor states, the Principality of Halych, the area ultimately became part of the Kingdom of Poland.

Following the Partitions of Poland of 1772, Prykarpattia fell under the Habsburg monarchy.

In the wake of the World War I and the fall of Austria-Hungary, it became disputed between Poland and a short-lived West Ukrainian People's Republic. After the Polish-Soviet War was concluded, it remained in Poland.

After the 1939 invasion and partition of Poland between Nazi Germany and the Soviet Union, the area was attached to the Ukrainian Soviet Socialist Republic (falling to Nazi control after the start of Operation Barbarossa and until 1944). It remains a part of modern Ukraine, incorporated into the western Ukrainian oblast of Ivano-Frankivsk, roughly corresponding to the southern half of the oblast.

== Geography ==
The region of Pokuttya today is used interchangeably with Prykarpattia. There are no official borders established between both of them. When referring to Prykarpattia it is understood that it is the whole Ivano-Frankivsk Oblast. As for Pokuttya, it is only for the eastern part of the same region. Sometimes the southern Lviv Oblast is considered part of Prykarpattia such as cities of Stryi, Truskavets, and Drohobych. The Dnister river is the major waterway in the region to where series of other minor rivers flow. The other major cities in the region from the earlier mentioned are Halych, Kalush, Ivano-Frankivsk and many others. The region is home to such Ukrainian cultures as Hutsuls, Lemky, Boyky, and others.

== Places of interest ==
- Deliatyn (Polish: Delatyn)
- Hody-Dobrovidka (Polish: Gody-Dobrowódka)
- Halych (Polish: Halicz)
- Ivano-Frankivsk (Polish: Stanisławów)
- Kolomyia (Polish: Kołomyja, Romanian: Colomeea)
- Kalush (Polish: Kałusz)
- Kosmach (Polish: Kosmacz)
- Dolyna (Polish: Dolina)
- Kosiv (Polish: Kosów Huculski, Romanian: Cosău)
- Kuty (Polish: Kuty, Romanian: Cuturi)
- Lanchyn (Polish: Łanczyn)
- Pechenizhyn (Polish: Peczeniżyn)
- Obertyn (Polish: Obertyn, Romanian: Obertin)
- Verkhovyna (Polish: Żabie)
- Vorokhta (Polish: Worochta)
- Yabluniv (Polish: Jabłonków)
- Yaremche (Polish: Jaremcze)
- Zabolotiv (Polish: Zabłotów)
- Carpathian National Nature Park

== See also ==
- Pokuttya
- Bukovina
- Eastern Galicia
- Western Ukraine
- Outer Subcarpathia
- Zakarpattia
