= Lučenec-Košice Depression =

The Lučenec-Košice Depression (in Slovak, Lučensko-košická zníženina) is a geological feature on the border of Slovakia and northeastern Hungary.

The basin is considered part of the Inner Western Carpathians. Broadly it separates the Slovak Ore Mountains on the north from the North Hungarian Mountains on the south.

The basin consists of:

- the Southern Slovak Basin (SK: Juhoslovenská kotlina) + Central Ipoly Basin (HU: Középsö-Ipoly-medence) + Borsod Hills (HU: Borsodi-dombság)
- the Bodva Hills (SK: Bodvianska pahorkatina)
- the Košice Basin (SK: Košická kotlina) + Hernád-Valley Basin (HU: Hernádvölgy-medence)
