= Moldavian-Muntenian Carpathians =

Moldavian-Muntenian Carpathians, marked in red and labeled with D

The Moldavian-Muntenian Carpathians are a group of mountain ranges in Romania. These ranges are considered part of the Outer Eastern Carpathians. Within Romania, however, it is traditional to divide the Eastern Romanian Carpathians (in Romanian, Munții Carpați Orientali) into three geographical groups, instead in Outer and Inner Eastern Carpathians:

- North: Carpathians of Maramureș and Bukovina (Munții Carpați ai Maramureșului și Bucovinei) - MMB;
- Centre: Moldavian-Transylvanian Carpathians (Munții Carpați Moldo-Transilvani) - MMT;
- South: Curvature Carpathians (Munții Carpați de Curbură) - MC;

The Eastern Romanian (Oriental) Carpathians include:

- Ridges of Bukovina (RO: Obcinele Bucovinei), i.e. Obcina Mare (Great Ridge), Obcina Mestecăniș (Mestecăniș Ridge) and Obcina Feredeului (Feredeu Ridge). In Romania these are considered part of the northern Carpathians of Maramureș and Bukovina (Munții Carpați ai Maramureșului și Bucovinei)
- Stânișoara Mountains (RO: Munții Stânișoarei). In Romania considered part of the central Carpathians of Moldavia and Transylvania (Munții Carpați Moldo-Transilvani), or "MMT"
- Tarcău Mountains (RO: Munții Tarcăului). MMT
- Comănești Depression (RO: Depresiunea Comănești) MMT
- Nemira Mountains (RO: Munții Nemira) MMT
- Ciuc Mountains (RO: Munții Ciucului), including the Bodoc Mountains (RO: Munții Bodocului), MMT
- Bârsa Mountains (RO: Munții Bârsei), in Romania considered part of the Curvature Carpathians, or "MC"
- Ciucaș Mountains (RO: Munții Ciucaș), MC
- Baiu Mountains (RO:Munții Baiului or Munții Gârbova) MC
- Buzău Mountains (RO: Munții Buzăului), MC
- Vrancea Mountains (RO: Munții Vrancei), MC
