= Ciuc =

Ciuc may refer to:

- Ciuc Mountains, a mid-high range of mountains of Harghita County in Transylvania
- Ciuc County, a former county in the Kingdom of Romania
- Miercurea Ciuc, county seat of Harghita County, Romania

== See also ==
- Ciucaș (disambiguation)
