= South-Moravian Carpathians =

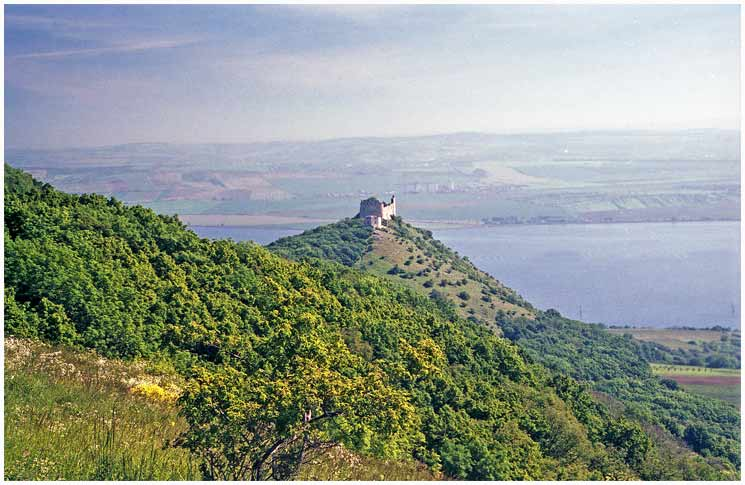
- View of Děvičky Castle, Pálava, Czech Republic

Highest point
- Peak: Děvín
- Elevation: 549 m (1,801 ft)
- Coordinates: 48°52′10″N 16°38′59″E

Naming
- Native name: Jihomoravské Karpaty (Czech); Österreichisch-Südmährische Karpaten (German)

Geography
- South-Moravian Carpathians (marked in red) within the Outer Western Carpathians
- Countries: Czech Republic and Austria
- Regions: Moravia and Lower Austria
- Parent range: Outer Western Carpathians

The South-Moravian Carpathians (Czech: Jihomoravské Karpaty), also called Austrian - South-Moravian Carpathians (German: Österreichisch-Südmährische Karpaten) are a mountain range of the Outer Western Carpathians along the border of the Czech Republic and Austria.

Geologically, this range forms the southwestern outskirts of the Western Carpathians, separated from the Central Moravian Carpathians in the northeast by lower foothills and the Thaya Valley at Přítluky. In the south the hilly region stretches down to the Danube River near Stockerau, separating it from the Alpine Vienna Woods in the south.

== Subdivision ==
The South-Moravian Carpathians consist of:

- Mikulov Highlands (Czech: Mikulovská vrchovina) in Moravia, much of which is contained within the Pálava Protected Landscape Area
- Lower Austrian Inselberg Threshold (German: Niederösterreichische Inselbergschwelle) in the Weinviertel region of Lower Austria.

According to Austrian geography, both subranges made of lime and marlstone form a geological entity called Waschbergzone, which is considered part of the Carpathian Foreland.

- Dyje-Svratka Vale (German: Thaya-Schwarza Thalsenke, Czech: Dyjsko-svratecký úval) .
