= Ciucaș Peak =

Mountain peak in Romania

Ciucaș
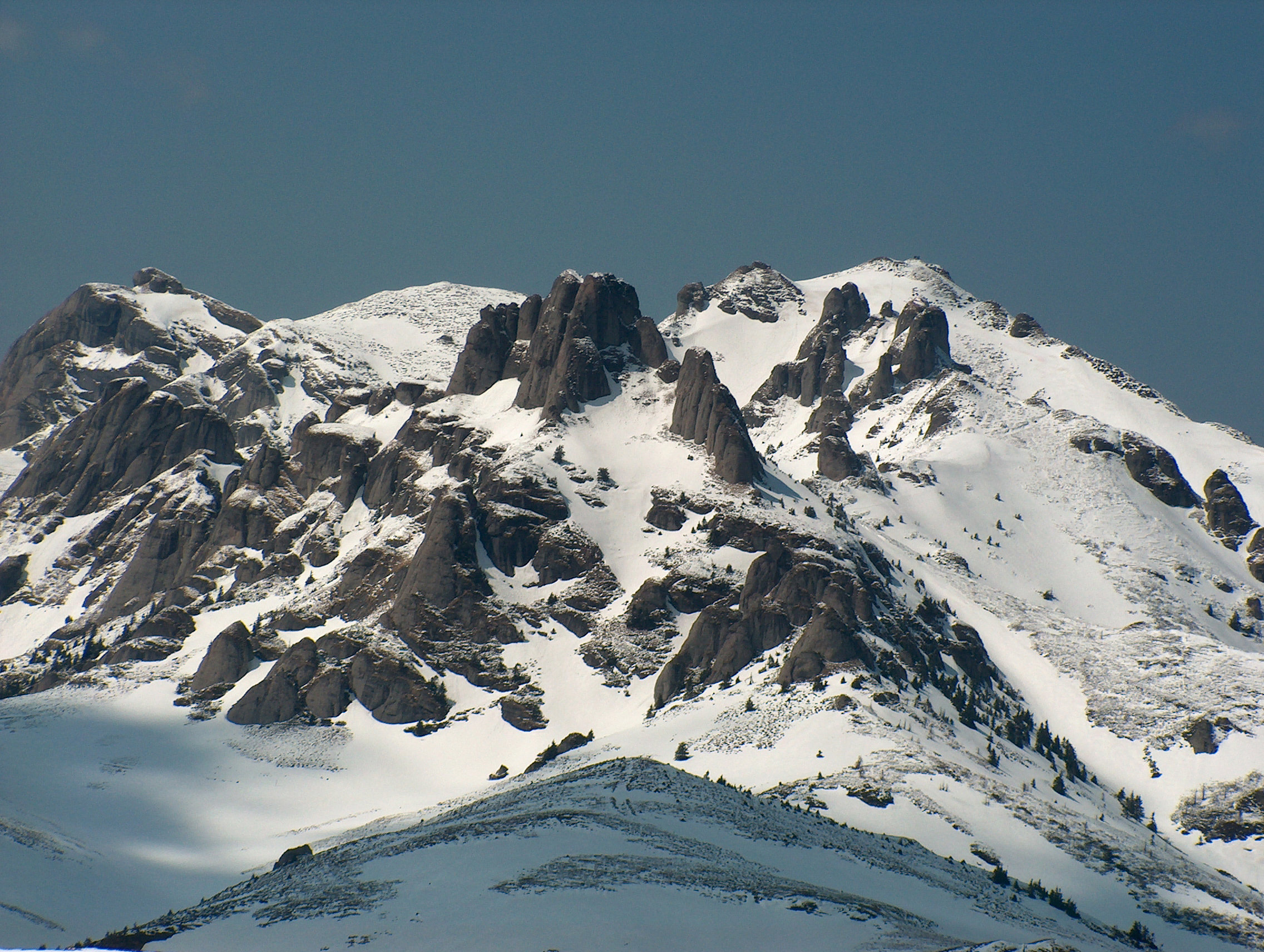
- Ciucaș Peak seen from Muntele Rosu

Highest point
- Elevation: 1,954 m (6,411 ft)
- Coordinates: 45°31′22″N 25°55′25″E

Geography
- Location: Romania
- Parent range: Ciucaș Mountains, Southern Carpathians

Climbing
- Easiest route: Scramble

Ciucaș Peak (Romanian: Vârful Ciucaș, Hungarian: Csukás-hegy, German: Krähenstein) is the highest peak of Ciucaș Mountains, Southern Carpathians. Its elevation is 1,954 m (6,411 ft).
