= Ciucaș Mountains =

Mountain range in Romania

Ciucaș
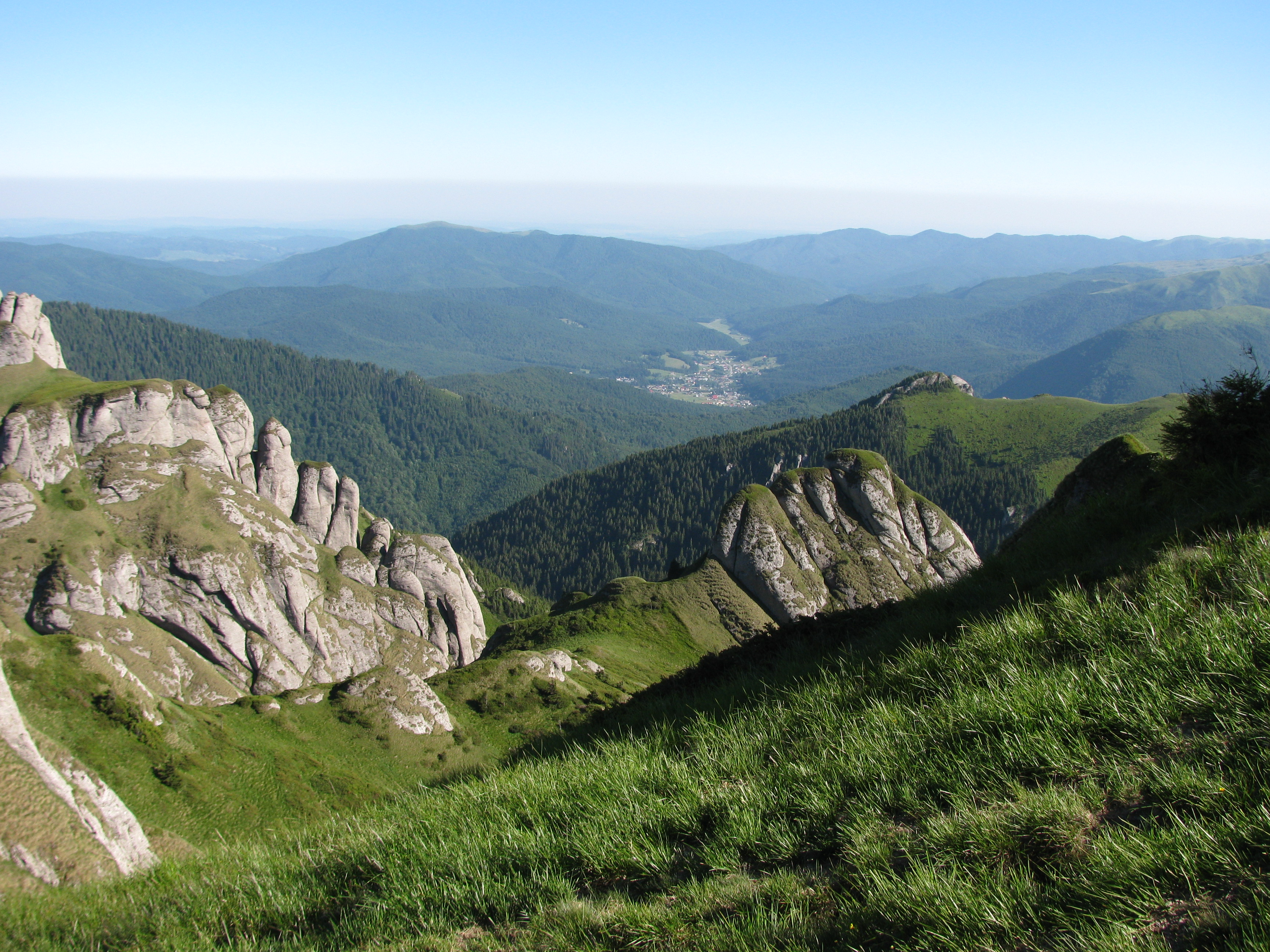
- View of the Ciucaș

Highest point
- Peak: Ciucaș Peak
- Elevation: 1,954 m (6,411 ft)
- Coordinates: 45°31′22″N 25°55′25″E

Geography
- Location: Romania
- Counties: Prahova, Brașov
- Parent range: Moldavian-Muntenian Carpathians

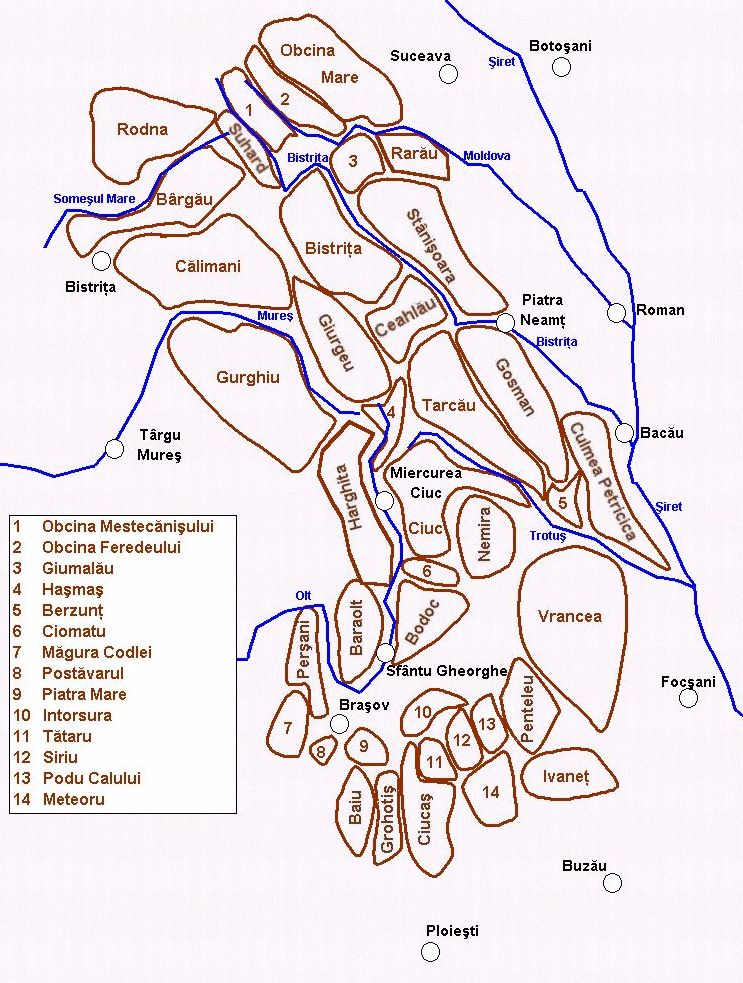
Map of the Eastern Carpathians, with the Ciucaș Mountains at the extreme south

The Ciucaș Mountains (Romanian: Munții Ciucaș, Hungarian: Csukás-hegység) is a mountain range in Romania. It is located in the northern part of Prahova County and straddles the border with Brașov County.

The highest peak is Vârful Ciucaș (Ciucaș Peak), at 1,954 metres (6,411 ft); other peaks are Gropșoare at 1,883 metres (6,178 ft), Tigăile Mari at 1,844 metres (6,050 ft), and Zăganu at 1,817 metres (5,961 ft). The range consists of two ridges — the Ciucaș–Bratocea ridge in the southwest-northeast direction and the Gropșoarele–Zăganu ridge in the northwest-southeast direction — joined by the saddle formed by the Chirușca peak. The Ciucaș ridge is to the north and comprises the Ciucaș Peak, while the Bratocea ridge is to the south and has a length of over 5 kilometres (3.1 mi).

The headwaters of the Buzău River, the Teleajen River, the Tărlung River, and many others are located in these mountains.

In Romania, the Ciucaș Mountains are considered part of the Curvature Carpathians. Geologically, according to the divisions of the Carpathians, the range is part of the Moldavian-Muntenian Carpathians, of the larger group of the Outer Eastern Carpathians. It is bordered to the northeast by the Tătaru Mountains to the east, the Întorsurii Mountains to the north, and the Grohotiș Mountains to the west.

The Cheia village is close to the mountain.
