= Curvature Carpathians =

Romanian mountain range

Coordinates: 45°35′N 26°16′E

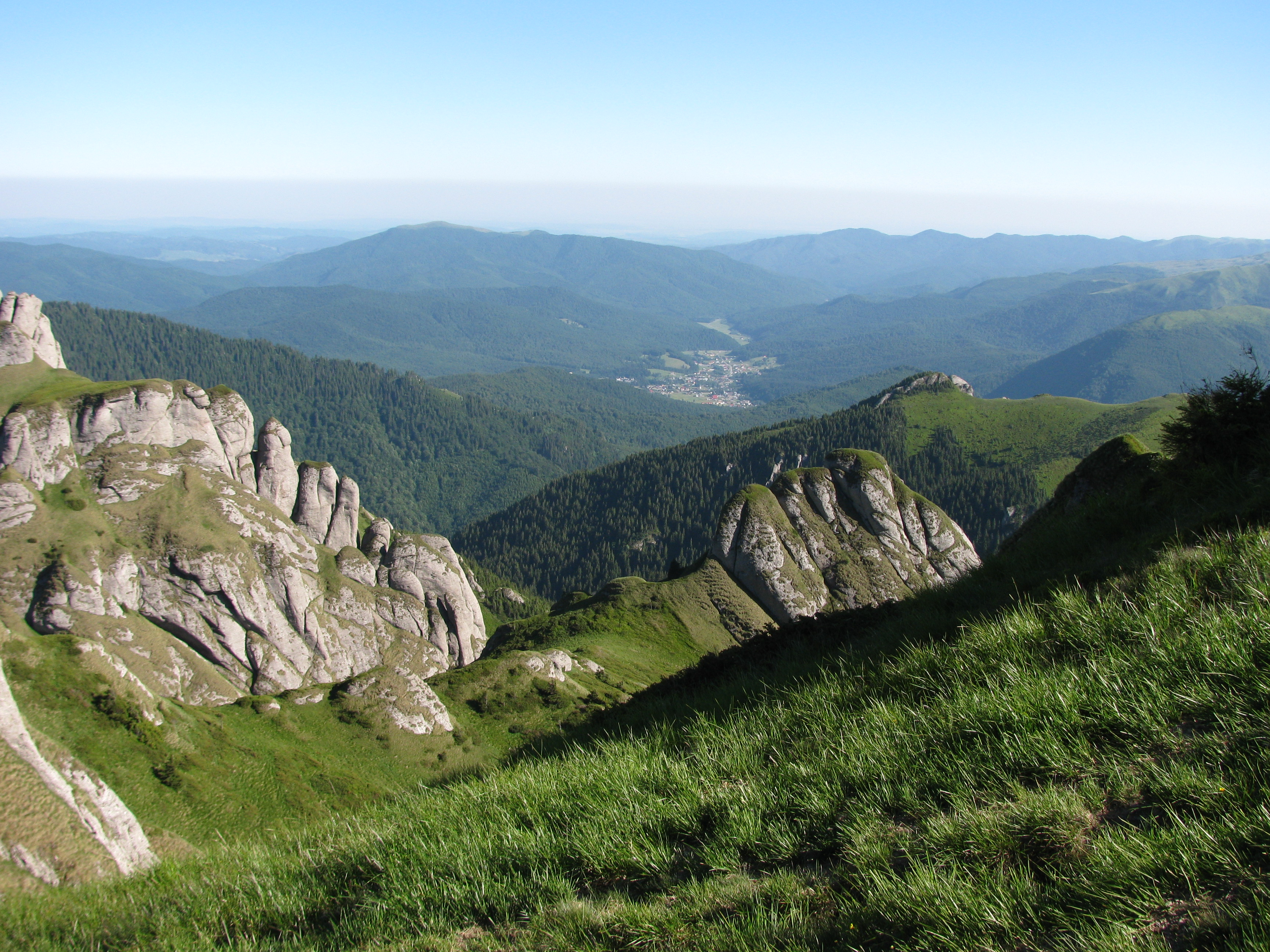
Ciucaș mountains, Prahova County, in the Curvature Carpathians

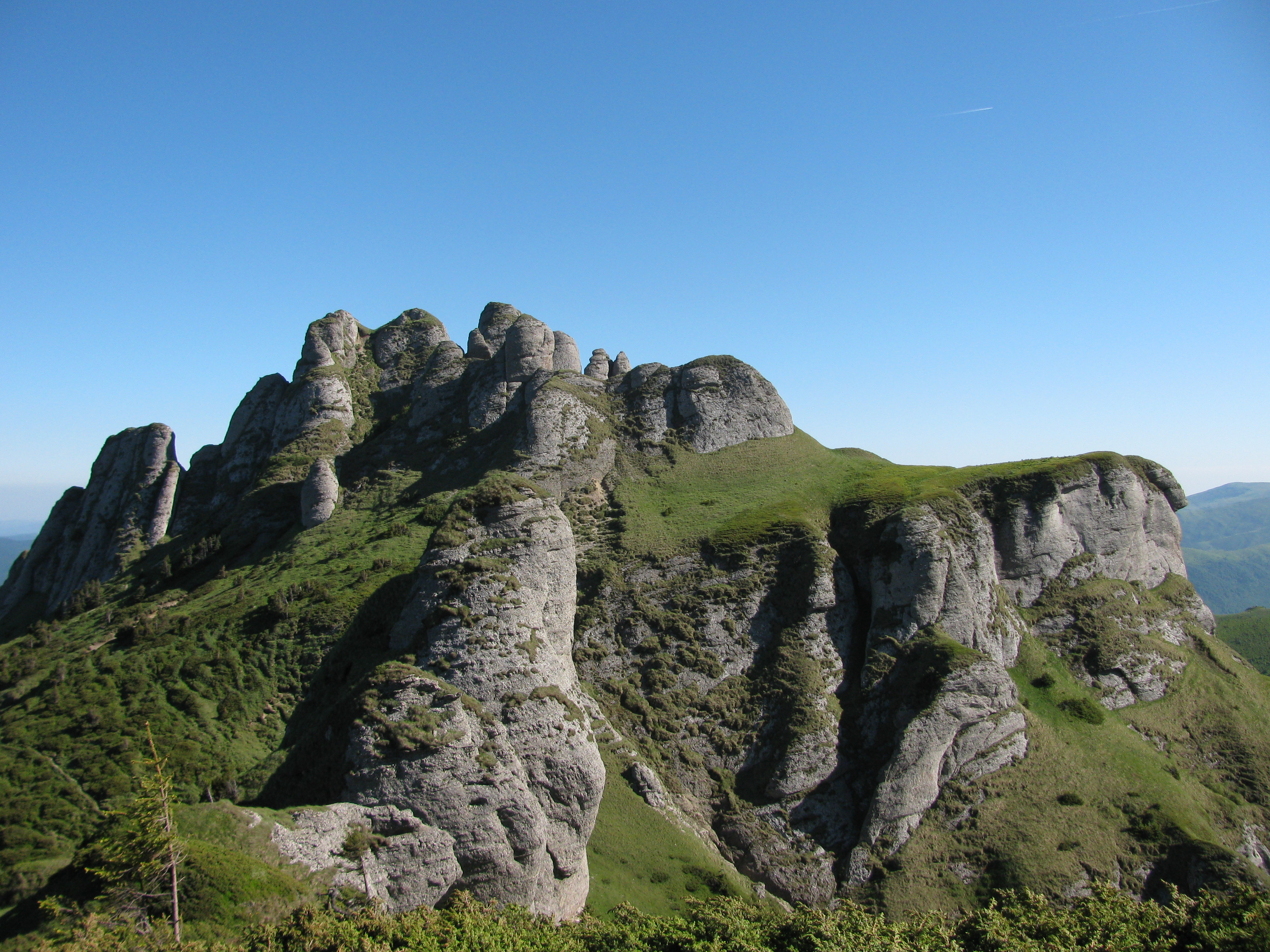
Ciucaș mountains, Prahova County

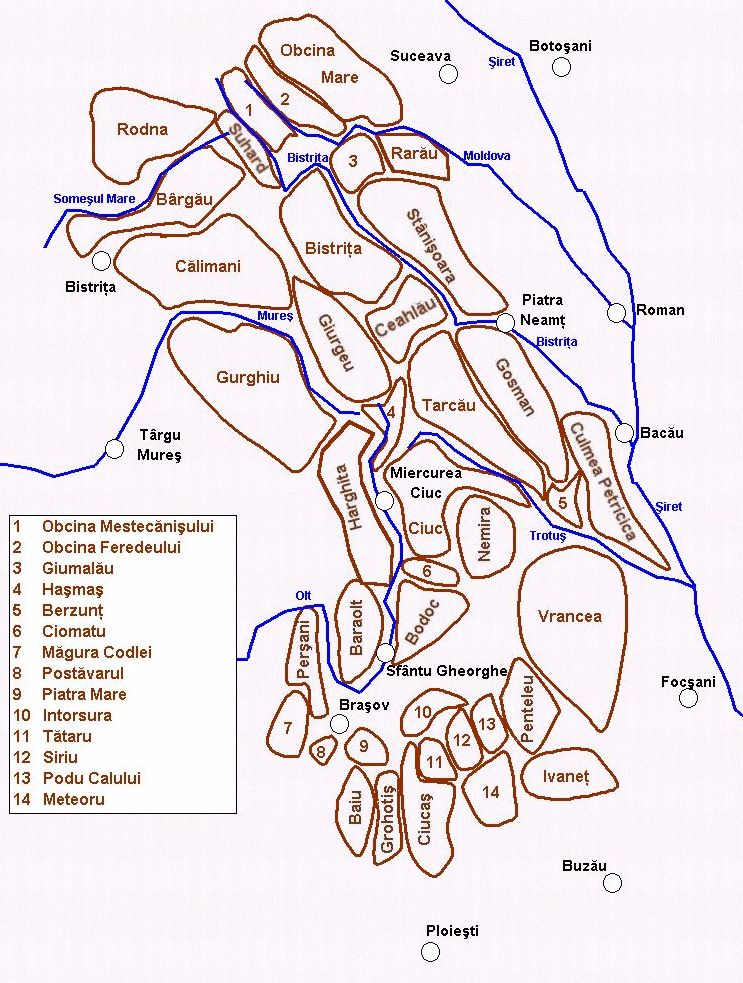
Map of the Eastern Carpathians, with the Curvature Carpathians to the south

The Curvature Carpathians (Romanian: Carpații de Curbură; Hungarian: Kárpátkanyar) are the Southernmost stretch of the Eastern Carpathians, stretching from the Trotuș River to the Prahova River. The highest peak is Ciucaș (1954 m).

The Curvature Carpathians are one of the three traditional classifications of the Eastern Carpathians in Romania:

- In the north, the Carpathians of Maramureș and Bucovina (Munții Carpaţi ai Maramureșului și Bucovinei).
- In the center, the Carpathians of Moldavia and Transylvania (Munții Carpați Moldo-Transilvani).
- In the south, the Curvature Carpathians (Munții Carpați de Curbură).

They include:

- Bârsa Mountains (Munții Bârsei)
- Ciucaș Mountains (Munții Ciucaș)
- Buzău Mountains (Munții Buzăului)
- Vrancea Mountains (Munții Vrancei)
- Baiu Mountains (Munții Baiului or Munții Gârbova)
- Brașov Depression (Depresiunea Brașovului)

Geologically, based on the divisions of the Carpathians, the entirety of the Curvature Carpathians are part of the Outer Eastern Carpathians.
