= Central Beskidian Piedmont =

Geographical region of Poland

- Ecoregion
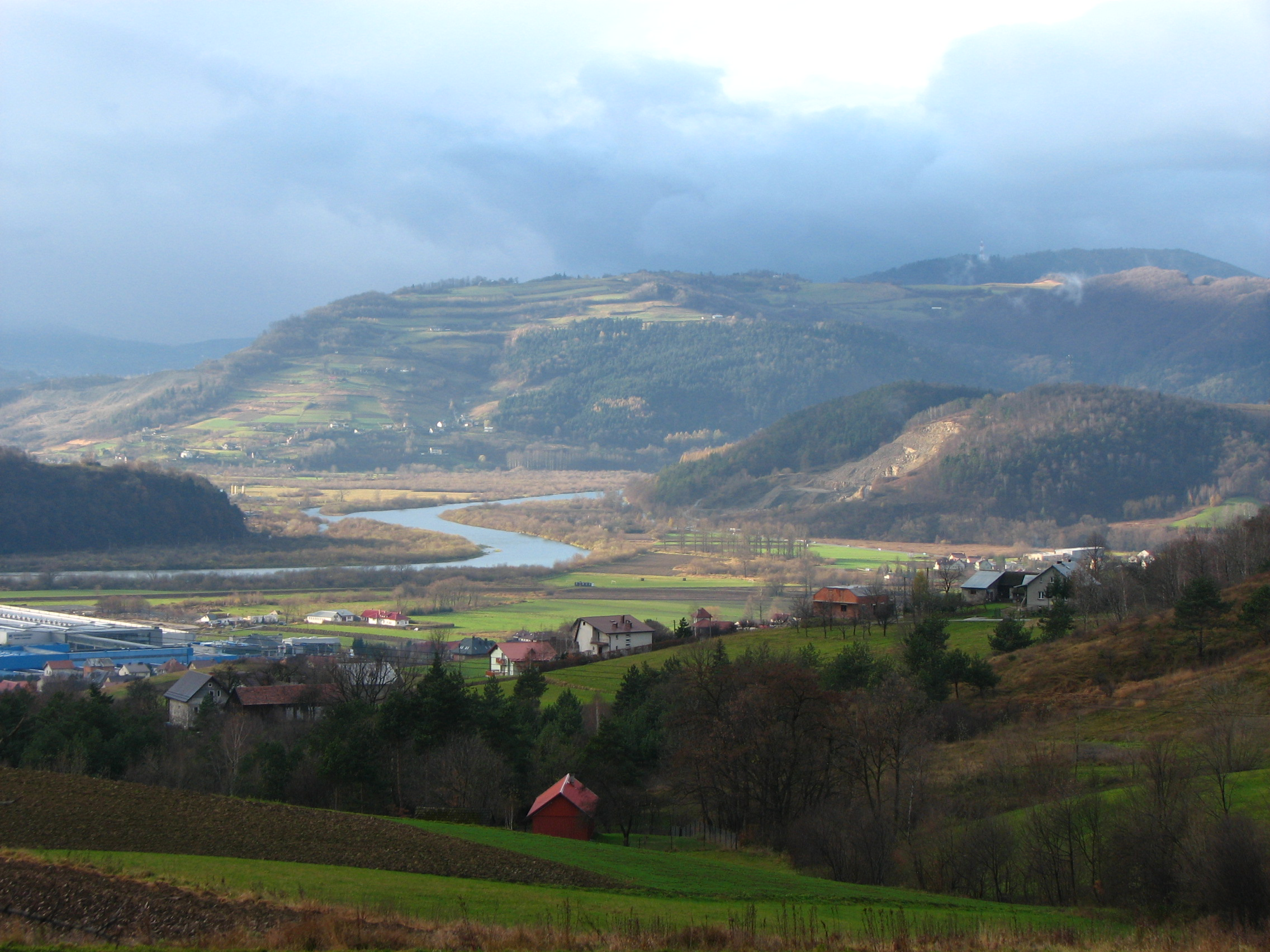
- Dunajec River, Rożnów Piedmont, Poland

- Central Beskidian Piedmont, marked in red and labeled with A

The Central Beskidian Piedmont (Polish: Pogórze Środkowobeskidzkie) is a geographical region in southeastern Poland. It lies north of the Central Beskids, and belongs to the Outer Eastern Carpathians, representing the northernmost region of the Carpathians.

== Subdivision ==
The Central Beskidian Piedmont consists of:

- Rożnów Piedmont (PL: Pogórze Rożnowskie)
- Ciężkowice Piedmont (PL: Pogórze Ciężkowickie)
- Strzyżów Piedmont (PL: Pogórze Strzyżowskie)
- Dynów Piedmont (PL: Pogórze Dynowskie)
- Przemyśl Piedmont (PL: Pogórze Przemyskie)
- Gorlice Depression (PL: Obniżenie Gorlickie)
- Jasło-Krosno Basin (PL: Kotlina Jasielsko-Krośnieńska)
- Jasło Piedmont (PL: Pogórze Jasielskie)
- Bukowsko Piedmont (PL: Pogórze Bukowskie)

== See also ==
- Outer Eastern Carpathians
- Outer Subcarpathian regions
