= Oświęcim Basin =

Lowland in southern Poland

Coordinates: 50°2′N 19°10′E

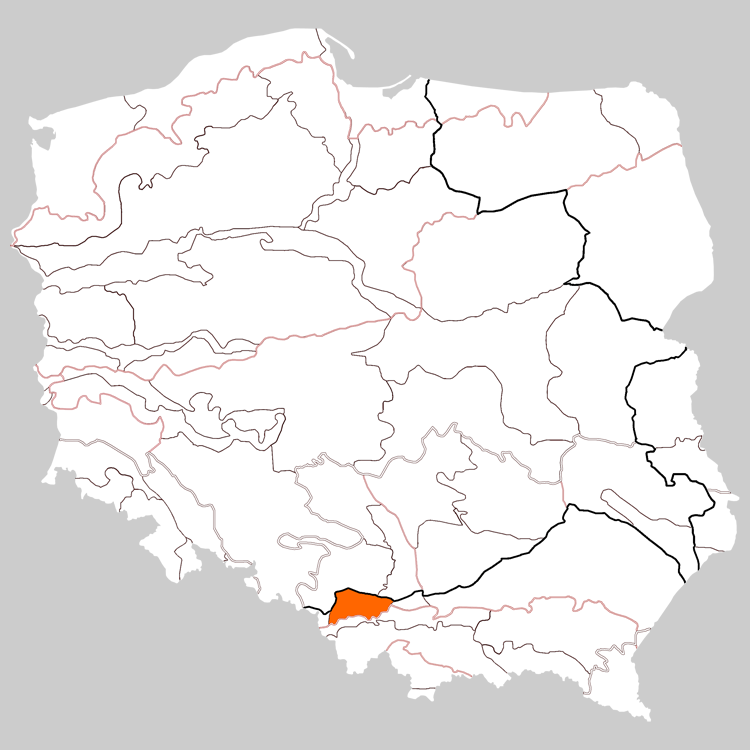

Oświęcim Basin (Polish: Kotlina Oświęcimska) is a lowland, located in southern Poland, between the Lesser Poland Highlands to the north, Silesian Foothills and Wieliczka Foothills to the south. It has the size of around 1,236 km^{2} (477 sq mi). Its name comes from the city of Oświęcim. It is located on the Vistula River on the confluences of Biała, Soła and Skawa which begin in Carpathian Mountains and Przemsza which begins in Silesian Highlands.
