= Kraków Gate (Ojców National Park) =

Rock gate

Kraków Gate Brama Krakowska
- Rock gate
- Location in Poland
- Coordinates: 50°11′45.2″N 19°49′43.9″E
- Location: Ojców National Park, Poland
- Formed by: Erosion
- Geology: Limestone

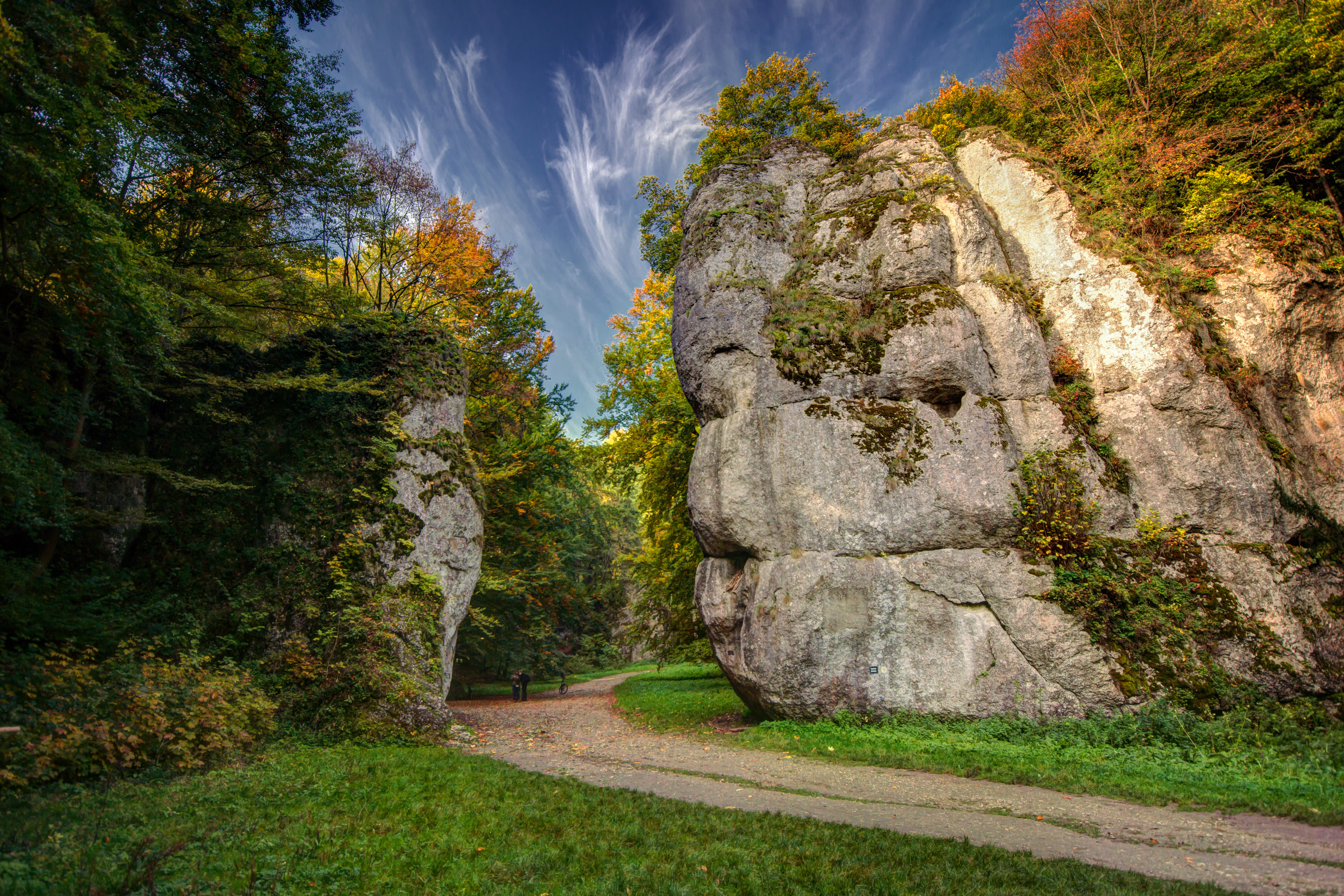
Kraków Gate

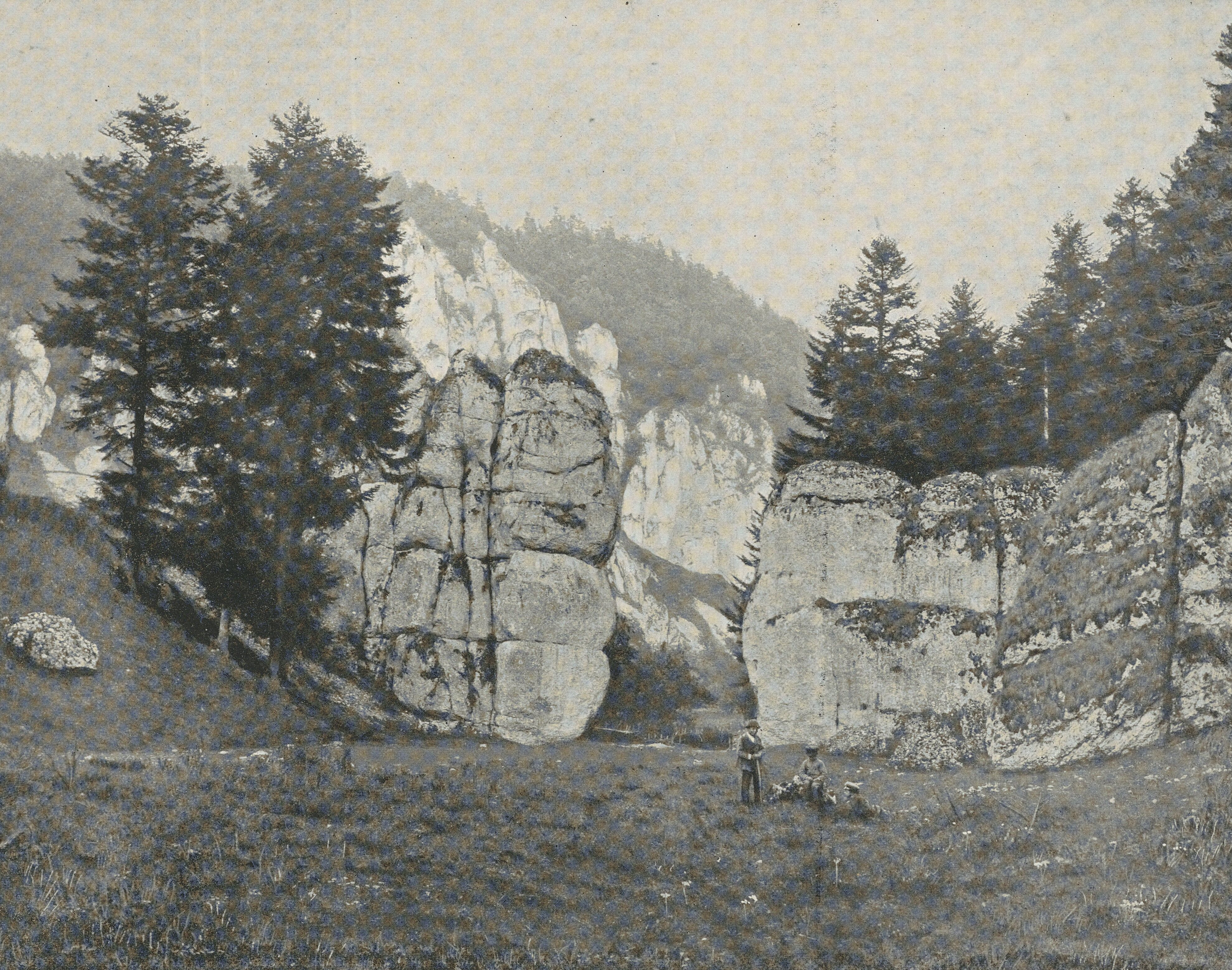
View before 1899

Kraków Gate (Polish: Brama Krakowska) is one of the few rock gates in Ojców National Park. It is in the Valley of the Pradnik and closes the outlet of the Cracow Gorge Gateway to the valley. It is a classic example of the gates of rock. The name derives from the fact that once led the way trade route from Kraków to Silesia.

In 1928, it was laid on the memorial plaque on the occasion of the construction of a new road from Krakow to Ojcow, running the bottom of the Pradnik Valley, but because of the protests of environmentalists, array removed in 1935.

== Bibliography ==
- Dolinki Podkrakowskie. Mapa turystyczna 1:25 000. Kraków: Wyd. Compass, 2006. ISBN 83-89165-95-3.
- Józef Partyka: Ojcowski Park Narodowy: przewodnik turystyczny. Warszawa: Sport i Turystyka Muza SA, 2006. ISBN 83-7319-963-2.
