= Beskids =

Series of mountain ranges in the Carpathians

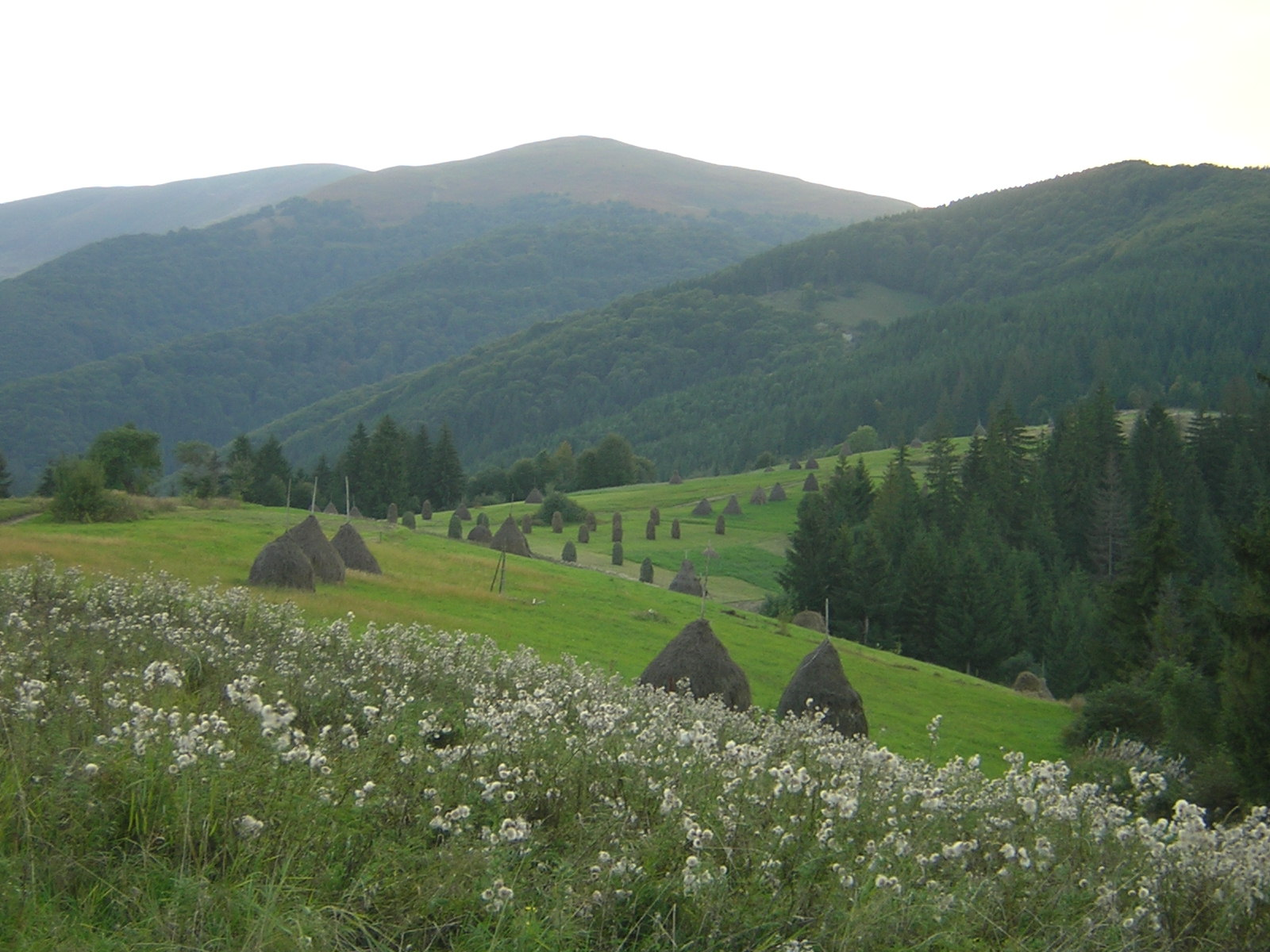
- Eastern Beskids in Zakarpattia Oblast, Ukraine

Highest point
- Peak: Hoverla
- Elevation: 2,061 m (6,762 ft)
- Coordinates: 48°09′36″N 24°30′01″E

Dimensions
- Length: 600 km (370 mi)
- Width: 70 km (43 mi)

Naming
- Native name: Beskidy (Polish); Beskydy (Czech); Beskydy (Slovak); Бескиди (Ukrainian)

Geography
- Countries: Poland; Slovakia; Czech Republic; Ukraine
- Regions: Silesia; Lesser Poland; Moravia; Carpathian Ruthenia
- Parent range: Western and Eastern Carpathians
- Borders on: Sudetes; Tatra Mountains

The Beskids or Beskid Mountains (Polish: Beskidy; Czech: Beskydy; Slovak: Beskydy; Rusyn: Бескиды, Beskydŷ; Ukrainian: Бескиди, Beskydy) are a series of mountain ranges in the Carpathians, stretching from the Czech Republic in the west along the border of Poland with Slovakia up to Ukraine in the east.

The highest mountain in the Beskids is Hoverla, at 2,061 m (6,762 ft).

== Etymology ==
The origin of the name beskydy has not been conclusively established. A Thracian or Illyrian origin has been suggested; however, as yet, no theory has majority support among linguists. The word appears in numerous mountain names throughout the Carpathians and the adjacent Balkan regions, like in Albanian bjeshkë. According to linguists Çabej and Orel, it is possibly derived from Proto-Albanian *beškāi tāi (meaning 'the mountain pastures'). The Slovak name Beskydy refers to the Polish Bieszczady Mountains, which is not a synonym for the entire Beskids but one single range, belonging to the Eastern Beskids. According to another linguistic theory, it may be related to Middle Low German beshêt, beskēt, meaning 'watershed'.

Historically, the term was used for hundreds of years to describe the mountain range separating the old Kingdom of Hungary from the old Kingdom of Poland. In 1269, the Beskids were known by the Latin name Beschad Alpes Poloniae 'Beskid Mountains of Poland'.

== Definition ==
The Beskids are approximately 600 km (370 mi) in length and 50–70 km (31–43 mi) in width. They stand mainly along the southern border of Lesser Poland with northern Slovakia, stretching to the Moravia and Czech Silesia regions of the eastern Czech Republic and to Carpathian Ruthenia in western Ukraine. Parts form the European Watershed, separating the Oder and Vistula basins in the north from the Eastern Slovak Lowland, part of the Great Hungarian Plain drained by the Danube River.

Geologically all of the Beskids stand within the Outer Western Carpathians and the Outer Eastern Carpathians. In the west they begin at the natural pass of the Moravian Gate, which separates them from the Eastern Sudetes, continue east in a band to the north of the Tatra Mountains, and end in Ukraine. The eastern termination of the Beskids is disputed. According to older sources, the Beskids end at the source of the Tisza River, while newer sources state that the Beskids end at the Uzhok Pass at the Polish–Ukrainian border.

== Subdivisions ==
Western section of Western Beskids, marked in red and labeled with E

Northern section of Western Beskids, marked in red and labeled with F

Eastern section of the Western Beskids, marked in red and labeled with H

Central section of the Western Beskids, marked in red and labeled with G

Multiple traditions, languages and nationalities have developed overlapping variants for the divisions and names of the Beskid ranges. According to the divisions of the Carpathians, they are categorized within:

=== Western Beskids ===
- Western Beskids (Polish: Beskidy Zachodnie, Slovak: Západné Beskydy, Czech: Západní Beskydy)
  - Western section of the Western Beskids:
    - Hostýn-Vsetín Mountains (Czech: Hostýnsko-vsetínská hornatina) → e1
    - Moravian-Silesian Beskids (Czech: Moravskoslezské Beskydy, Slovak: Moravsko-sliezske Beskydy) → e2
    - Turzovka Highlands (Slovak: Turzovská vrchovina) → e3
    - Jablunkov Furrow (Czech: Jablunkovská brázda) → e4
    - Rožnov Furrow (Czech: Rožnovská brázda) → e5
    - Jablunkov Intermontane (Slovak: Jablunkovské medzihorie, Czech: Jablunkovské mezihoří) → e6
    - Silesian Beskids (Polish: Beskid Śląski, Czech: Slezské Beskydy) → e7
    - Żywiec Basin (Polish: Kotlina Żywiecka) → e8
  - Northern section of the Western Beskids:
    - Little Beskids (Polish: Beskid Mały) → f1
    - Maków Beskids (Polish: Beskid Makowski) → f2
    - Island Beskids (Polish: Beskid Wyspowy) → f3
    - Gorce Mountains (Polish: Gorce) → f4
    - Rabka Basin (Polish: Kotlina Rabczańska) → f5
    - Sącz Basin (Polish: Kotlina Sądecka) → f6
  - Central section of the Western Beskids:
    - Orava Beskids (Slovak: Oravské Beskydy) + Żywiec Beskids (Polish: Beskid Żywiecki) (the older Slovak equivalent of Beskid Zywiecki is Slovenské Beskydy 'Slovak Beskids' or Kysucko-oravské Beskydy 'Kysuce-Orava Beskids') → g1
    - Kysuce Beskids (Slovak: Kysucké Beskydy) +Żywiec Beskids (Polish: Beskid Żywiecki) (the older Slovak equivalent of Beskid Zywiecki is Slovenské Beskydy or Kysucko-oravské Beskydy) → g2
    - Orava Magura (Slovak: Oravská Magura) → g3
    - Orava Highlands (Slovak: Oravská vrchovina) → g4
    - Sub-Beskidian Furrow (Slovak: Podbeskydská brázda) → g5
    - Sub-Beskidian Highlands (Slovak: Podbeskydská vrchovina) → g6
  - Eastern section of the Western Beskids:
    - Beskid Sądecki (Polish: Beskid Sądecki) → h1
    - Čergov (Polish: Góry Czerchowskie; Slovak: Čergov) → h2
    - Pieniny (Polish: Pieniny; Slovak: Pieniny) → h3
- West Beskidian Foothills, in the Czech Republic and Poland
  - Silesian-Moravian Foothills (Czech: Podbeskydská pahorkatina, Polish: Pogórze Śląsko-Morawskie) → d1
  - Silesian Foothills (Polish: Pogórze Śląskie) → d2
  - Wieliczka Foothills (Polish: Pogórze Wielickie) → d3
  - Wiśnicz Foothills (Polish: Pogórze Wiśnickie) → d4

=== Central Beskids ===
Central Beskidian Piedmont, marked in red and labeled with A

Central Beskids, marked in red and labeled with B

- Central Beskids (Polish: Beskidy Środkowe) or Low Beskids (Slovak: Nízke Beskydy)
  - Busov, in Slovakia
  - Ondava Highlands (Slovak: Ondavská vrchovina)
  - Low Beskid (Polish: Beskid Niski) + Laborec Highlands (Slovak: Laborecká vrchovina)
  - Beskidian Southern Foothills (Slovak: Beskydské predhorie)
- Central Beskidian Piedmont, in Poland
  - Rożnów Piedmont (Polish: Pogórze Rożnowskie)
  - Ciężkowice Piedmont (Polish: Pogórze Ciężkowickie)
  - Strzyżów Piedmont (Polish: Pogórze Strzyżowskie)
  - Dynów Piedmont (Polish: Pogórze Dynowskie)
  - Przemyśl Piedmont (Polish: Pogórze Przemyskie)
  - Gorlice Depression (Polish: Obniżenie Gorlickie)
  - Jasło-Krosno Basin (Polish: Kotlina Jasielsko-Krośnieńska)
  - Jasło Piedmont (Polish: Pogórze Jasielskie)
  - Bukowsko Piedmont (Polish: Pogórze Bukowskie)

=== Eastern Beskids ===
Eastern Beskids, marked in red and labelled with C

Eastern Beskids are divided into two parallel ridges: Wooded Beskids and Polonynian Beskids.

- Wooded Beskids (Polish: Beskidy Lesiste; Ukrainian: Лісисті Бескиди)
  - Bieszczady Mountains (Polish: Bieszczady; Ukrainian: Бещади) → c1
  - Sanok-Turka Mountains (Polish: Góry Sanocko-Turczańskie; Ukrainian: Верхньодністровські Бескиди) → c3
  - Skole Beskids (Polish: Beskidy Skolskie; Ukrainian: Сколівські Бескиди) → c2
  - Gorgany (Polish: Gorgany; Ukrainian: Ґорґани) → c4
  - Pokuttia-Bucovina Beskids (Polish: Beskidy Pokucko-Bukowińskie; Ukrainian: Покутсько-Буковинські Карпати) → c5
- Polonynian Beskids (Polish: Beskidy Połonińskie; Ukrainian: Полонинські Бескиди)
  - Smooth Polonyna (Ukrainian: Полонина Рівна) → c6
  - Polonyna Borzhava (Ukrainian: Полонина Боржава) → c7
  - Polonyna Kuk (Ukrainian: Полонина Кук) → c8
  - Red Polonyna (Ukrainian: Полонина Красна)→ c9
  - Svydovets (Ukrainian: Свидівець) → c10
  - Chornohora (Ukrainian: Чорногора) → c11
  - Hrynyavy Mountains (Ukrainian: Гриняви) → c12

== Infrastructure ==
The Beskids are currently rich in forest and coal. In the past they were rich in iron ore, with important plants in Ostrava and Třinec – Třinec Iron and Steel Works.

There are many tourist attractions, including historic wooden churches (see Wooden Churches of Southern Little Poland, Carpathian Wooden Churches of Slovakia, and Wooden Churches of Ukraine) and the increasingly popular skiing resorts.

A number of environmental groups support a small but growing population of bears, wolves and lynx in the ecosystem of the Beskidy mountains. The Central Beskids include the Polish Babia Góra National Park and the adjacent Slovak Horná Orava Protected Landscape Area.

== Gallery ==
Map of the Beskid ranges in Slovakia and Poland

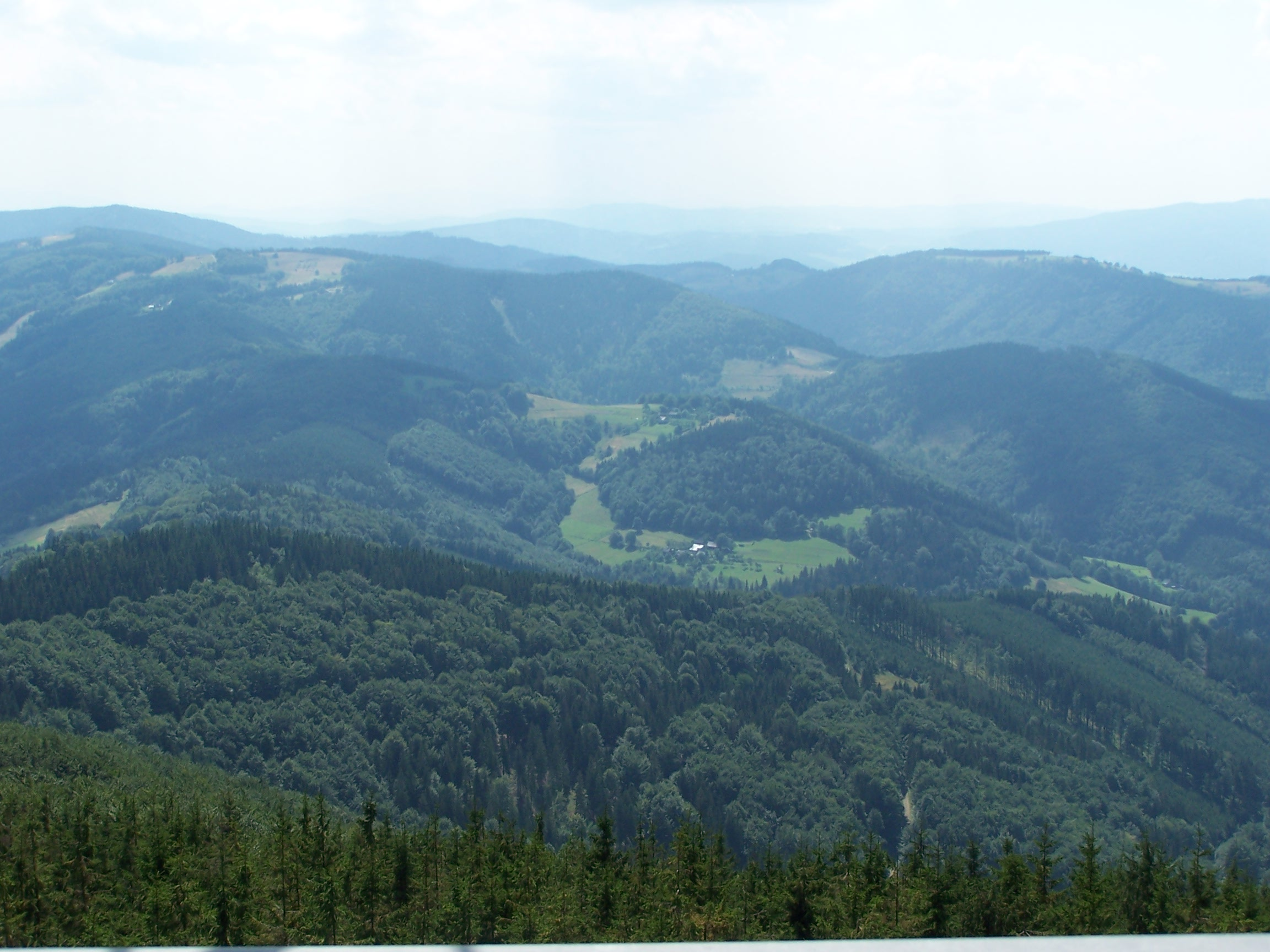
Czantoria, Silesian Beskids

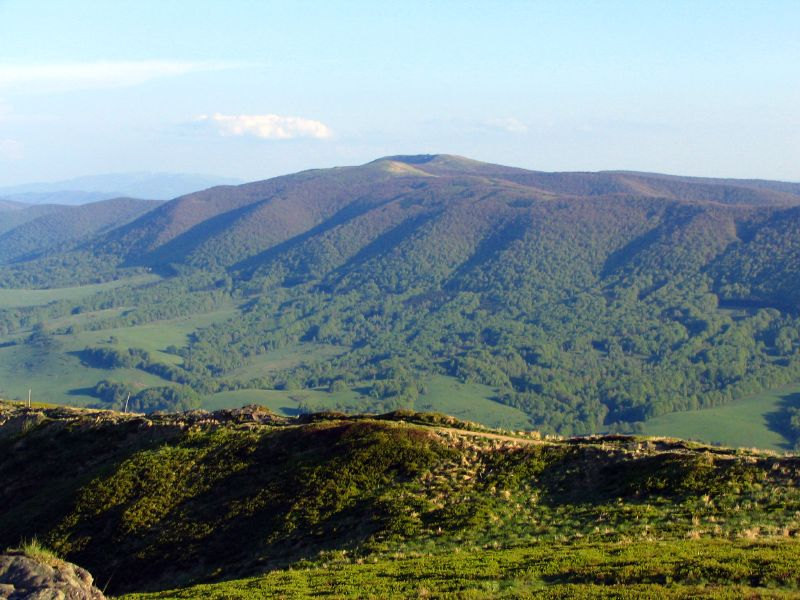
Western Bieszczady

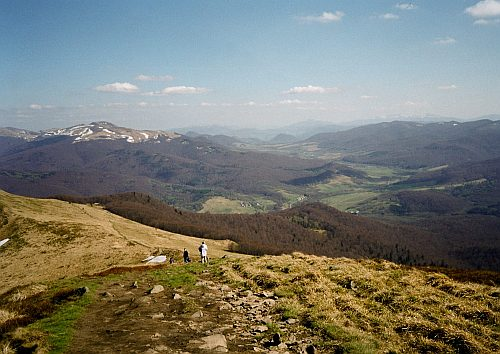
Western Bieszczady

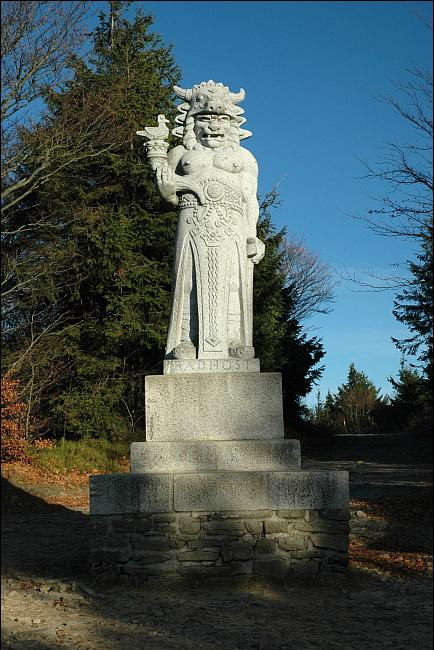
Statue of "Radegast" in the Czech Beskids

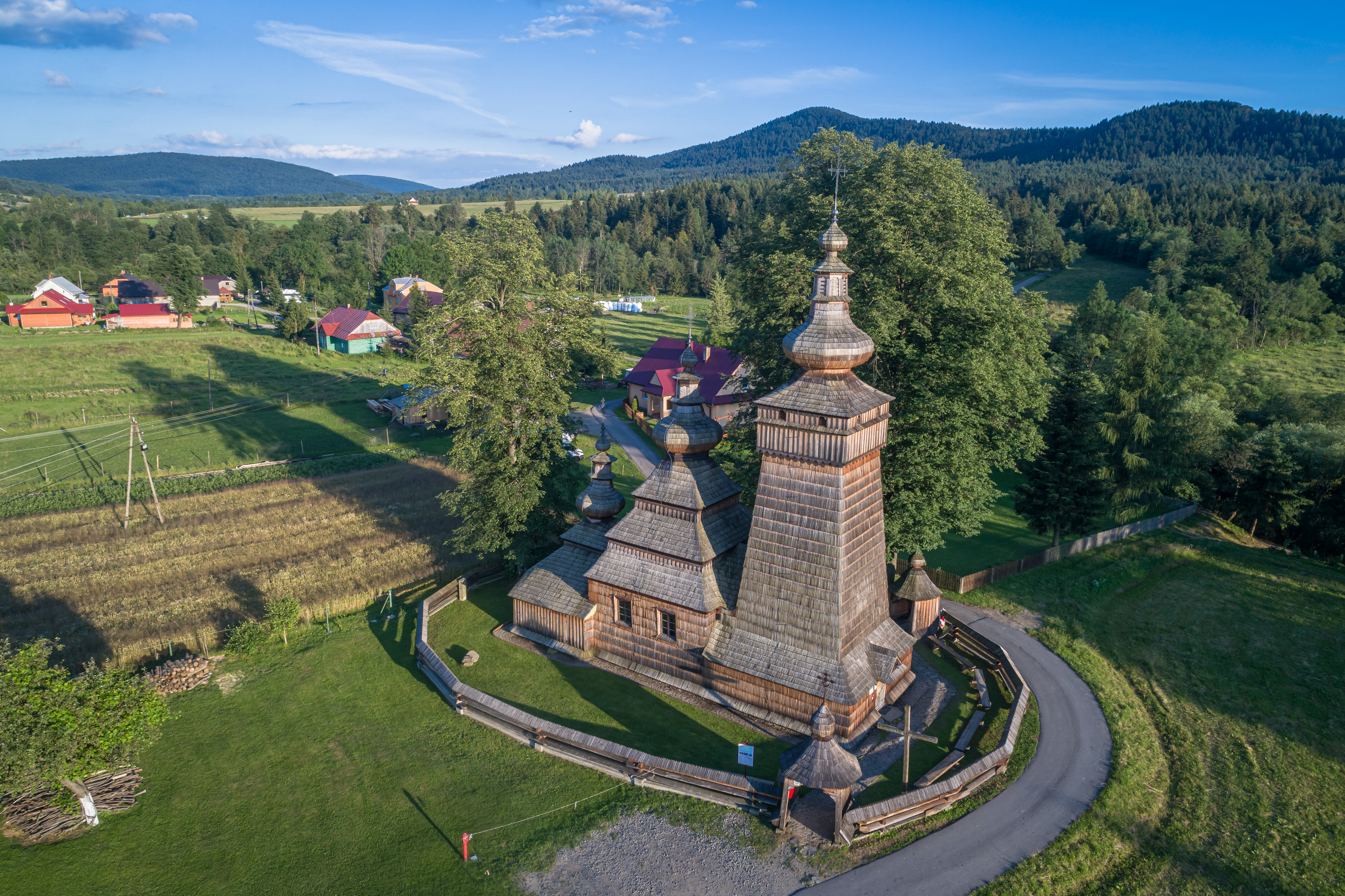
Wooden church in Kwiatoń

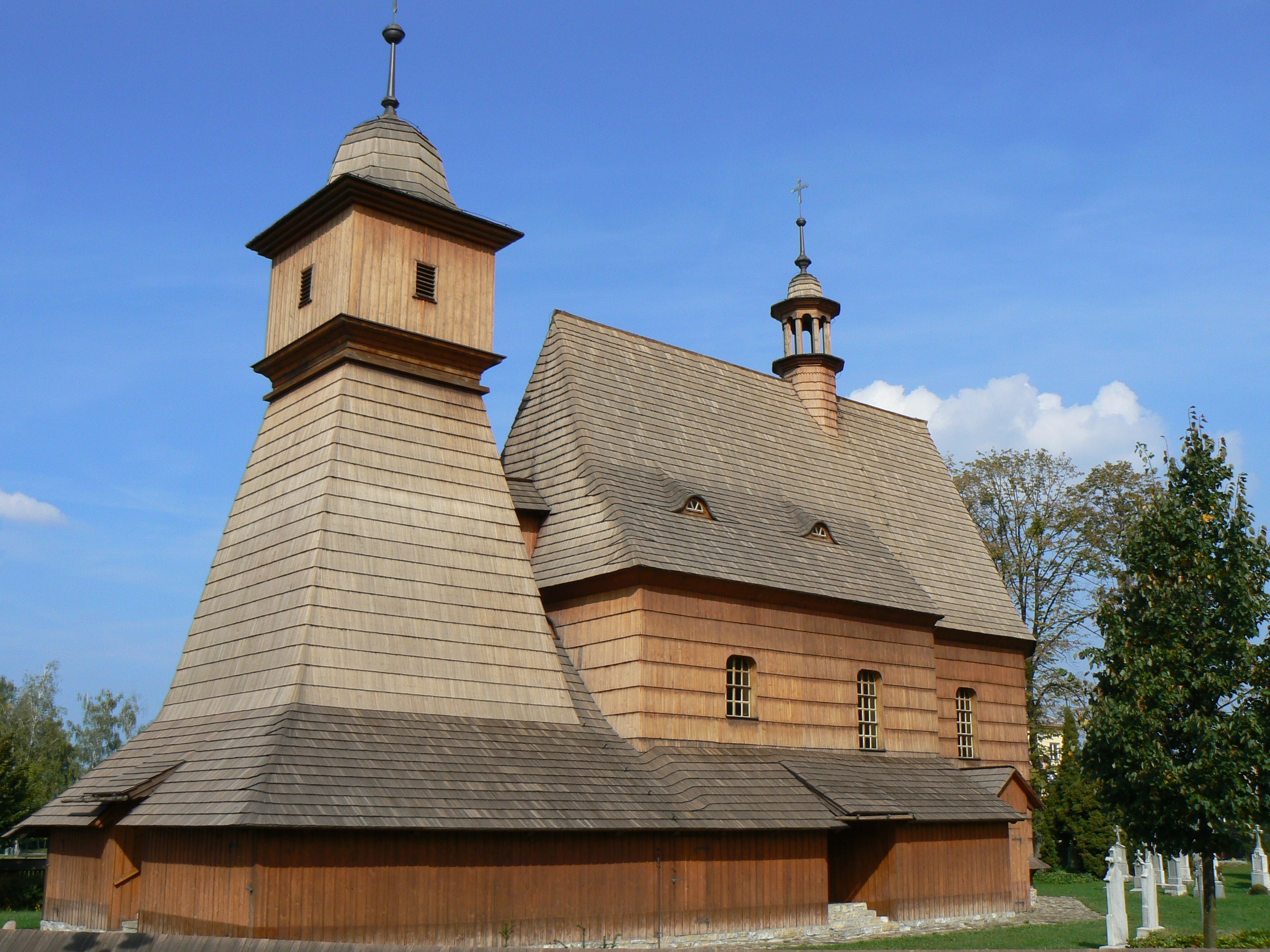
Wooden church in Hrabova, Moravia (14th century – 1564)

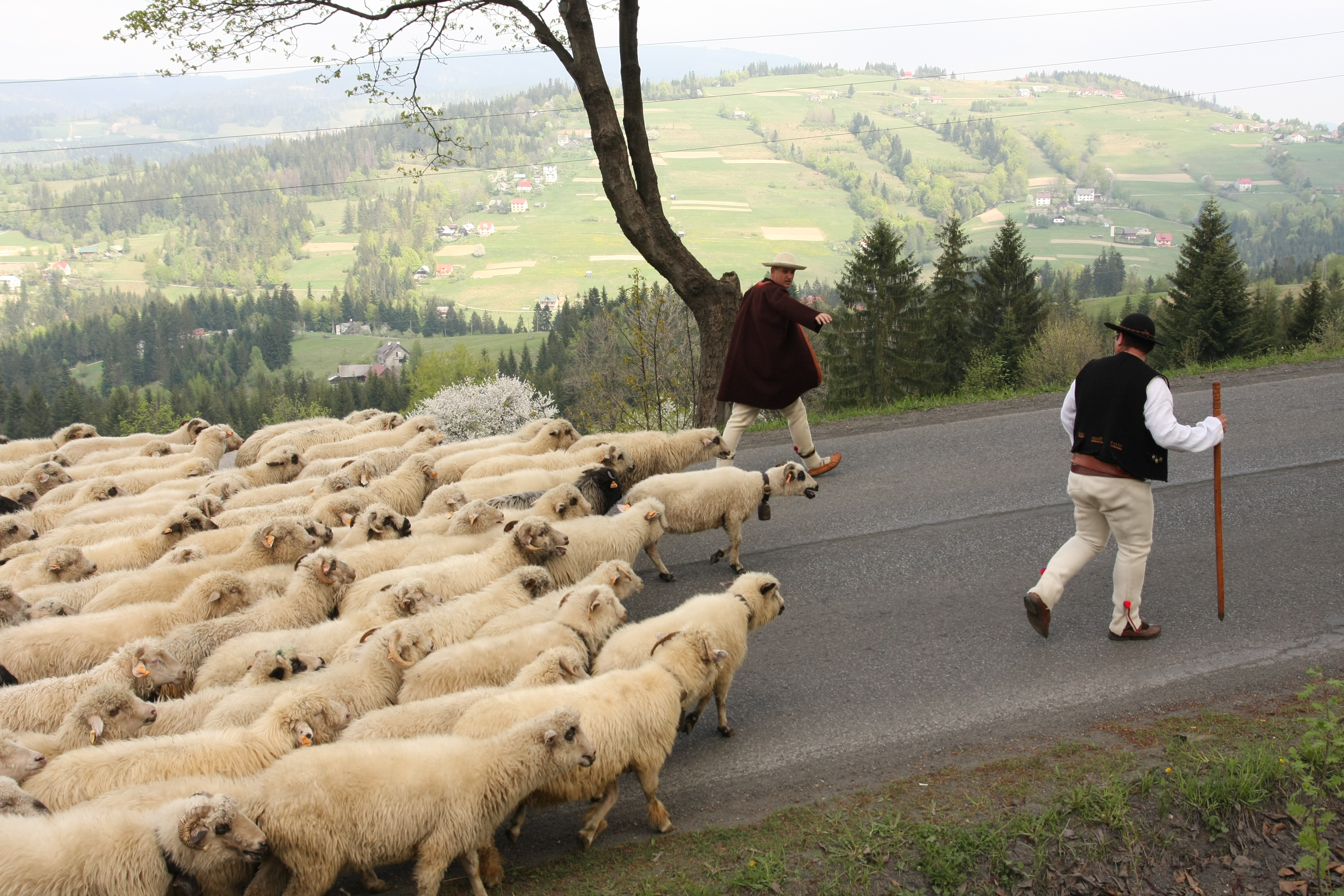
Shepherds in Silesian Beskids

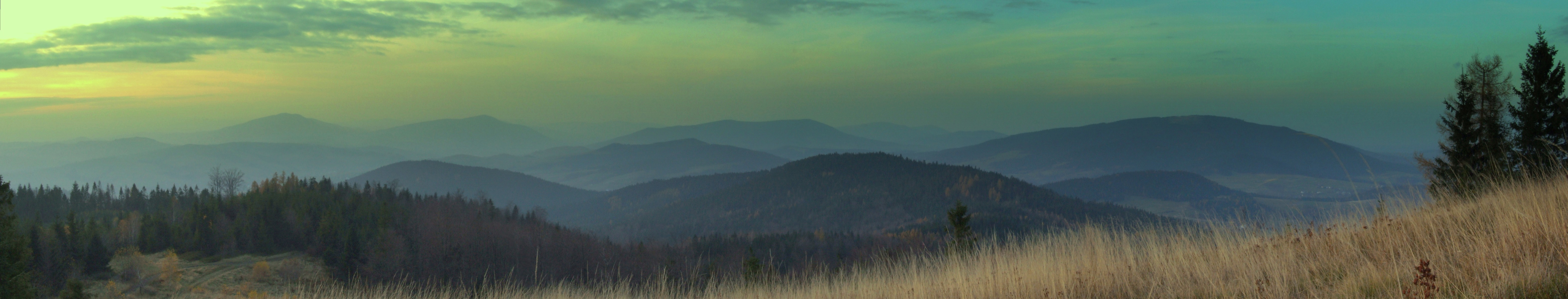
Island Beskids

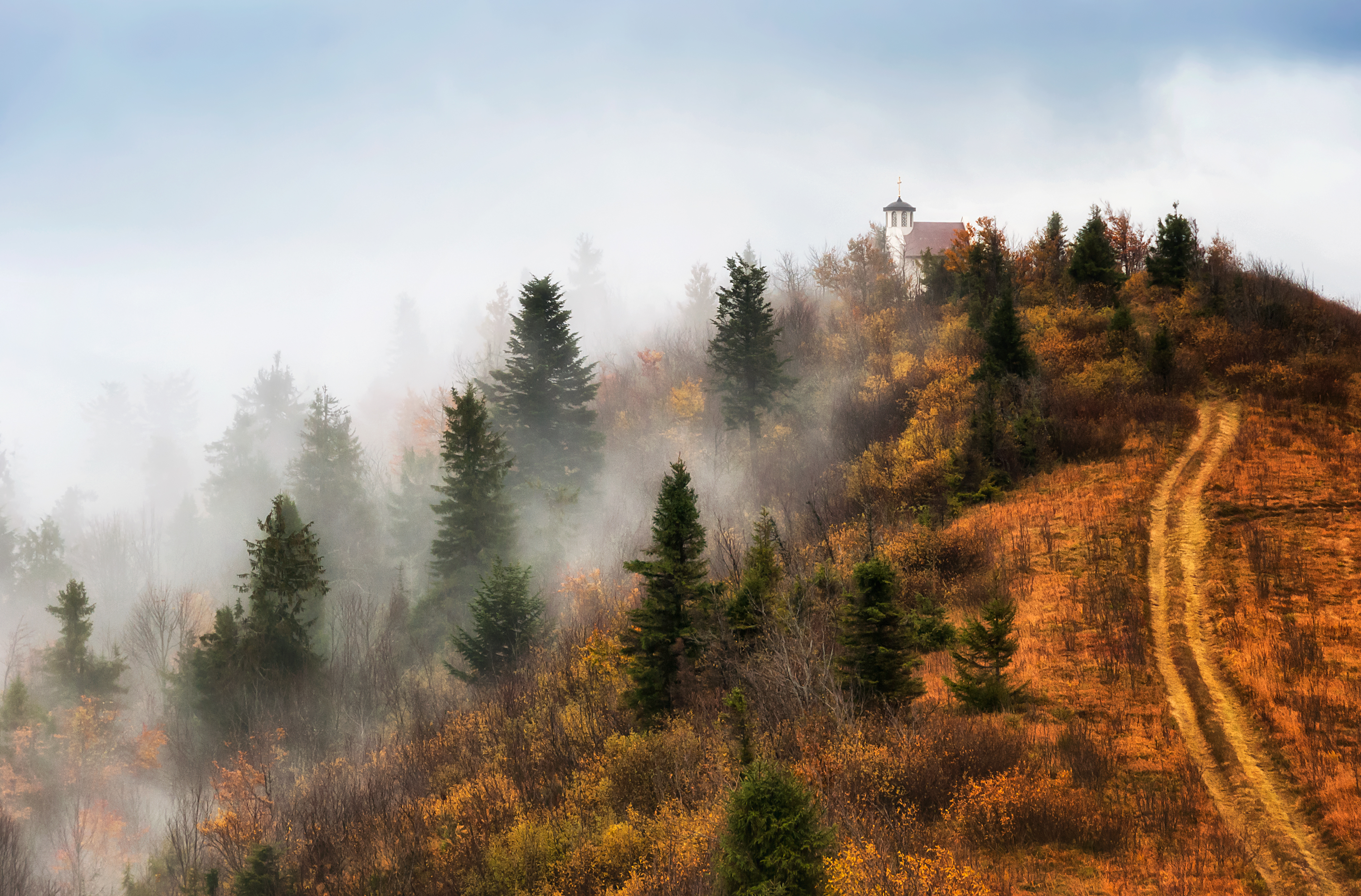
Skole Beskids in Ukraine

== See also ==
- Divisions of the Carpathians
- Polonyna (montane meadow)
- Ukrainian Carpathians
- Wooded Carpathians

== General and cited sources ==
- Földvary, Gábor Z. (1988). Geology of the Carpathian Region. Singapore: World Scientific Publishing Company.
- Kondracki, Jerzy (1977). Regiony fizycznogeograficzne Polski. Warszawa: Wydawa Uniwersytetu Warszawskiego.
- Kondracki, Jerzy (1989). Problemy standaryzacji nazw geograficznych. Warszawa: Instytut Geografii i Przestrzennego Zagospodarowania PWN.
- Kondracki, Jerzy (2000) [1998]. Geografia regionalna Polski (2. ed.). Warszawa: Wydawnictwo Naukowe PWN. ISBN 9788301130503.
- Świstuń, Filip. Galicyjskie Beskidy i Karpaty Lesiste: Zarys orograficzn. Rzeszow, 1876.
- Tasenkevich, Lydia (2009). "Polonynas: Highlands Pastures in the Ukrainian Carpathians". Grasslands in Europe: Of High Nature Value. Zeist: KNNV Publishing. pp. 203–208. ISBN 9789004278103.
