= Western Beskids =

Mountain range in Europe

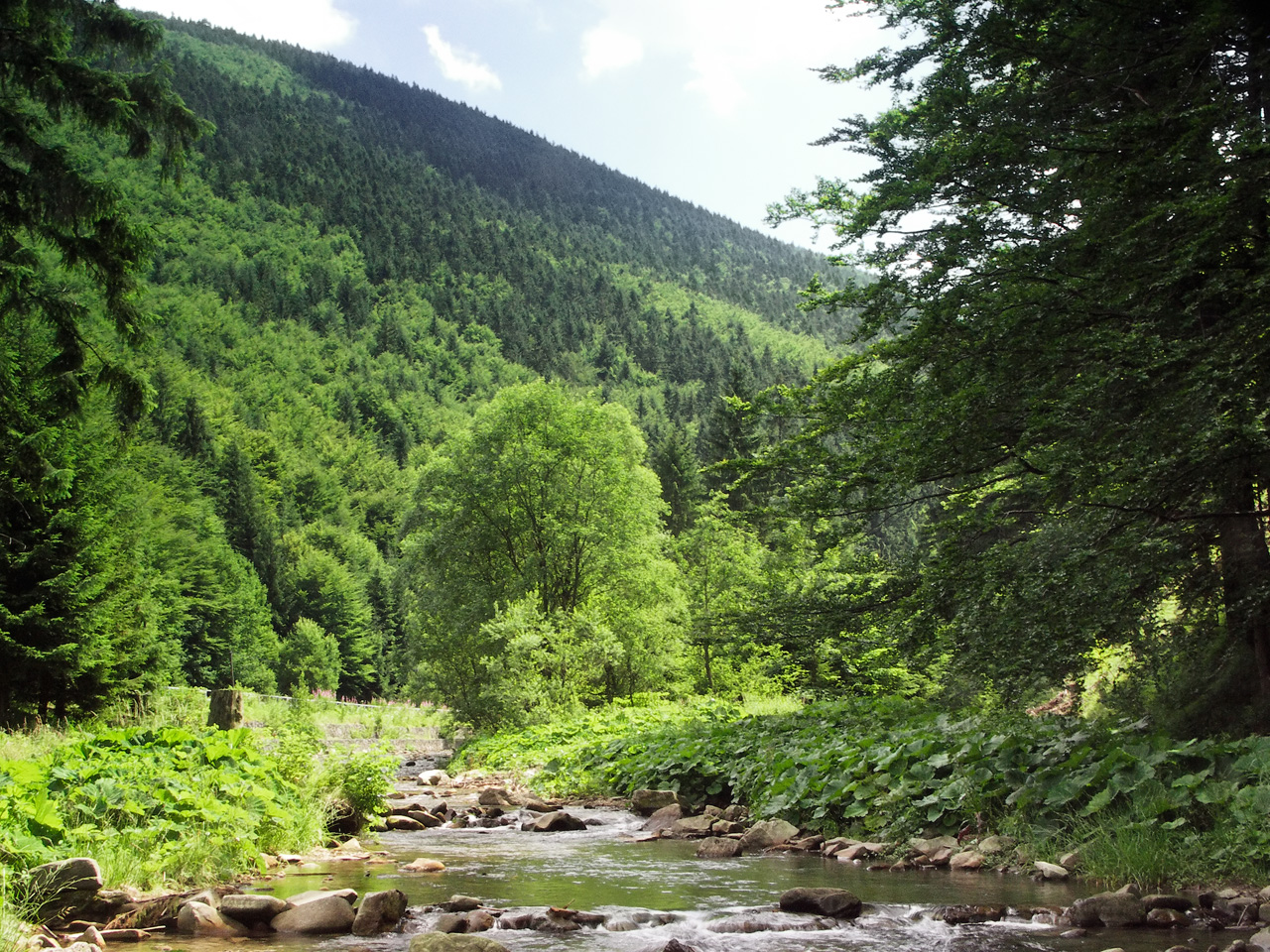
- Čeladenka River in the Moravian-Silesian Beskids

Highest point
- Peak: Lysá hora
- Elevation: 1,323 m (4,341 ft)
- Coordinates: 49°32′45″N 18°26′51″E

Naming
- Native name: Západní Beskydy (Czech); Beskidy Zachodnie (Polish)

Geography
- Countries: Czech Republic, Slovakia and Poland
- Regions: Moravia, Czech Silesia and Lesser Poland
- Parent range: Outer Western Carpathians
- Borders on: West Beskidian Foothills, Slovak-Moravian Carpathians, Central Beskids, Podhale-Magura Area, Central Beskidian Piedmont and Lower Beskids

The Western Beskids (Czech: Západní Beskydy; Slovak: Západné Beskydy; Polish: Beskidy Zachodnie; German: Westbeskiden) are a set of mountain ranges spanning the Czech Republic, Slovakia, and Poland. Geologically the Western Beskids are part of the Outer Western Carpathians.

Traditionally the Western Beskids were considered part of the Beskids, a term that differs according to historical and linguistic heritage.

== Subdivision ==
Western section of Western Beskids, marked in red and labeled with E

Northern section of Western Beskids, marked in red and labeled with F

Central section of the Western Beskids, marked in red and labeled with G

Eastern section of the Western Beskids, marked in red and labeled with H

The Western Beskids consist of the following mountain ranges:

- Western section of the Western Beskids:
  - Hostýn-Vsetín Mountains (Czech: Hostýnsko-vsetínská hornatina) → e1
  - Moravian-Silesian Beskids (Czech: Moravskoslezské Beskydy, Slovak: Moravsko-sliezske Beskydy) → e2
  - Turzovka Highlands (Slovak: Turzovská vrchovina) → e3
  - Jablunkov Furrow (Czech: Jablunkovská brázda) → e4
  - Rožnov Furrow (Czech: Rožnovská brázda) → e5
  - Jablunkov Intermontane (Slovak: Jablunkovské medzihorie, Czech: Jablunkovské mezihoří) → e6
  - Silesian Beskids (Polish: Beskid Śląski, Czech: Slezské Beskydy) → e7
  - Żywiec Basin (Polish: Kotlina Żywiecka) → e8
- Northern section of the Western Beskids:
  - Little Beskids (Polish: Beskid Mały) → f1
  - Maków Beskids (Polish: Beskid Makowski) → f2
  - Island Beskids (Polish: Beskid Wyspowy) → f3
  - Gorce Mountains (Polish: Gorce) → f4
  - Rabka Basin (Polish: Kotlina Rabczańska) → f5
  - Sącz Basin (Polish: Kotlina Sądecka) → f6
- Central section of the Western Beskids:
  - Orava Beskids (SK: Oravské Beskydy) + Żywiec Beskids (PL: Beskid Żywiecki) (the older SK equivalent of Beskid Zywiecki is "Slovenské Beskydy" - Slovak Beskids or "Kysucko-oravské Beskydy" - Kysuce-Orava Beskids) → g1
  - Kysuce Beskids (SK: Kysucké Beskydy) +Żywiec Beskids (PL: Beskid Żywiecki) (the older SK equivalent of Beskid Zywiecki is "Slovenské Beskydy" or "Kysucko-oravské Beskydy") → g2
  - Orava Magura (SK: Oravská Magura) → g3
  - Orava Highlands (SK: Oravská vrchovina) → g4
  - Sub-Beskidian Furrow (SK: Podbeskydská brázda) → g5
  - Sub-Beskidian Highlands (SK: Podbeskydská vrchovina) → g6
- Eastern section of the Western Beskids:
  - Beskid Sądecki (Polish: Beskid Sądecki) → h1
  - Čergov (Polish: Góry Czerchowskie; Slovak: Čergov) → h2
  - Pieniny (Polish: Pieniny; Slovak: Pieniny) → h3

== See also ==
- Western Beskidian Foothills
- Podhale-Magura Area
- Outer Western Carpathians
- Divisions of the Carpathians

== Maps ==
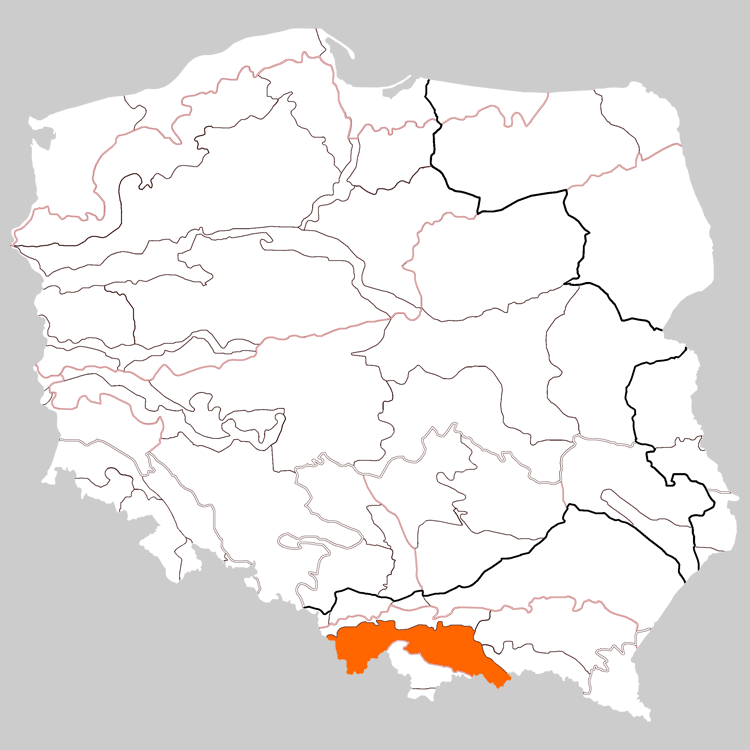
Parts of Western Beskids, within the borders of Poland

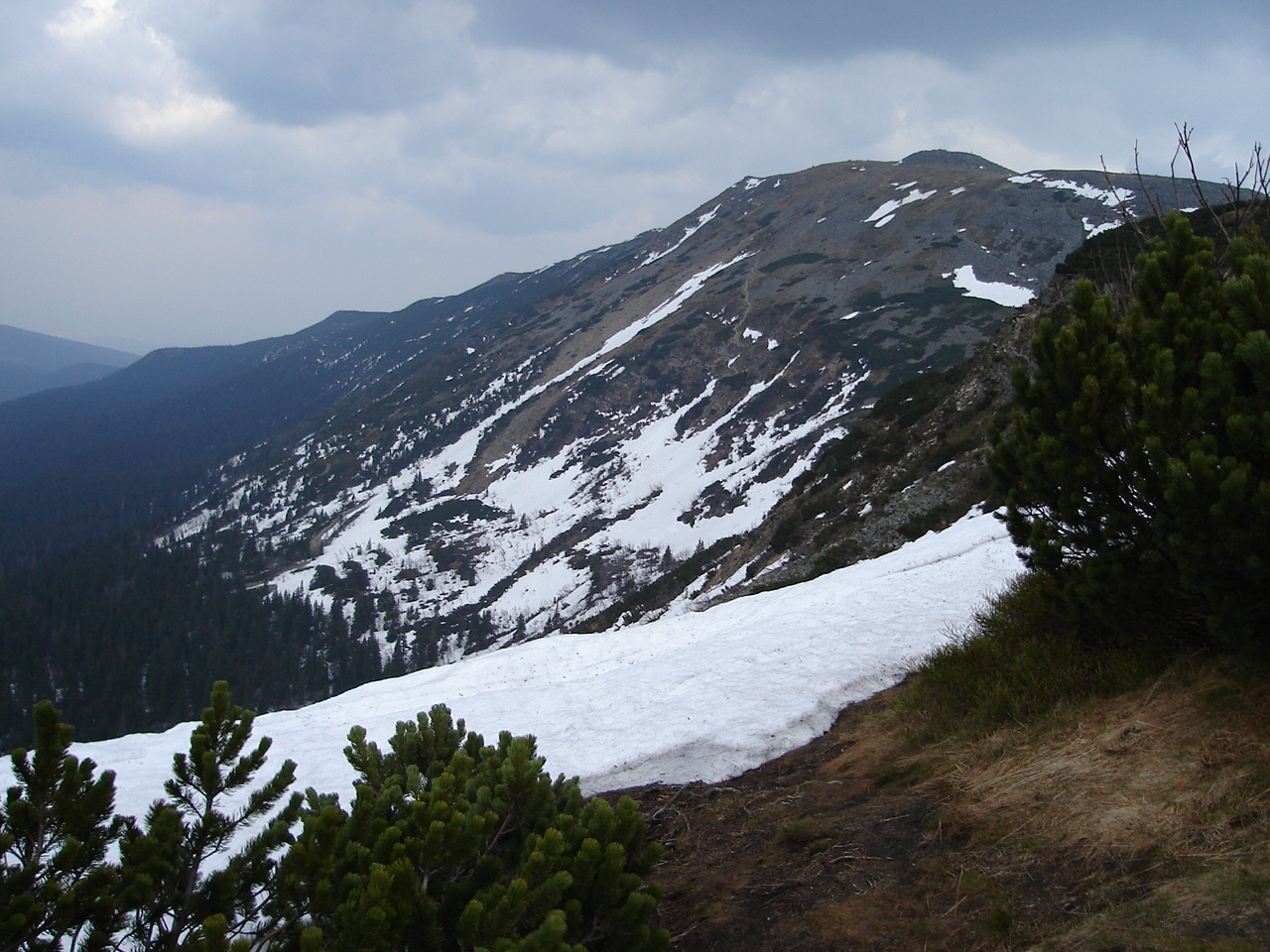
Babia Góra, the highest peak of the Orava Beskids, within central section of Western Beskids

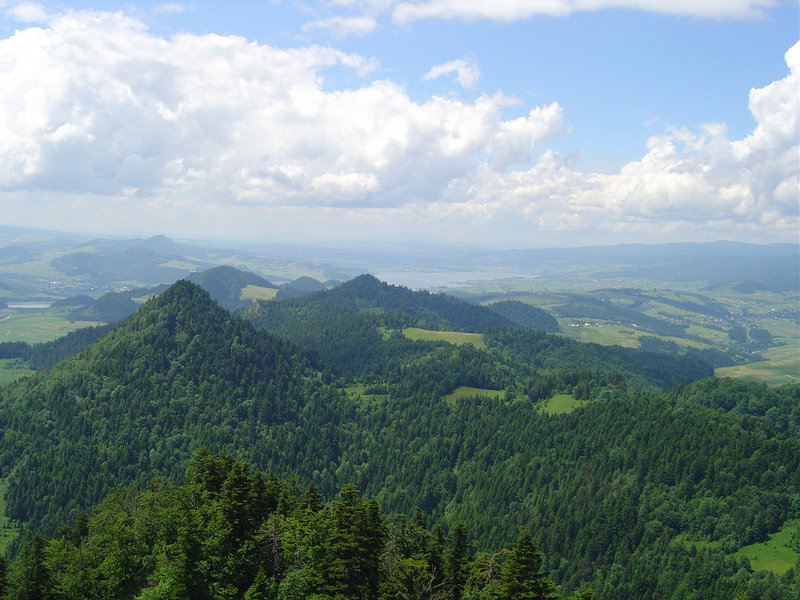
Pieniny Mountains, the eastern ranges of Western Beskids

== Sources ==
- Földvary, Gábor Z. (1988). Geology of the Carpathian Region. Singapore: World Scientific Publishing Company. ISBN 9789813103825.
- Kondracki, Jerzy (1977). Regiony fizycznogeograficzne Polski. Warszawa: Wydawa Uniwersytetu Warszawskiego.
- Kondracki, Jerzy (1989). Problemy standaryzacji nazw geograficznych. Warszawa: Instytut Geografii i Przestrzennego Zagospodarowania PWN.
- Kondracki, Jerzy (2000) [1998]. Geografia regionalna Polski (2. ed.). Warszawa: Wydawnictwo Naukowe PWN. ISBN 9788301130503.
