= Central Beskids (disambiguation) =

Central Beskids may refer to:

- Central Beskids, a mountain range within the Outer Eastern Carpathians, also known as the Lower Beskids
- in Slovak terminology, the term Central Beskids is used as a designation for the Central section of the Western Beskids
- in translations of geographic names, the term Central Beskids is sometimes also used as synonym for the Middle Beskids, a descriptive term that has specific meanings in different classifications

== See also ==
- Eastern Beskids (disambiguation)
- Beskidian Foothills (disambiguation)
- Beskid (disambiguation)
- Outer Eastern Carpathians
- Outer Western Carpathians
- Western Beskids
