= Eastern Beskids (disambiguation) =

Eastern Beskids may refer to:

- Eastern Beskids, mountain range of the Outer Eastern Carpathians, in south-eastern Poland, north-east Slovakia and western Ukraine
- in Czech and Slovak terminology, term Eastern Beskids is used as a designation for Eastern section of the Western Beskids

== See also ==
- Central Beskids (disambiguation)
- Beskidian Foothills (disambiguation)
- Beskid (disambiguation)
- Outer Eastern Carpathians
- Outer Western Carpathians
- Western Beskids
