= Beskid =

Beskid may refer to one of the following:

- Beskids, mountain ranges in Carpathian Mountains
- Beskid (car), a Polish economy car model
- Beskid Andrychów, a Polish football club
- Beskid (ski), tourist skis for mountain skiing, manufactured in Mukachevo

== See also ==
- Central Beskids (disambiguation)
- Eastern Beskids (disambiguation)
- Beskidian Foothills (disambiguation)
