= Mokroluh =

Municipality of Slovakia

- Municipality
- Flag

- Location of Mokroluh in the Prešov Region Location of Mokroluh in Slovakia
- Coordinates: 49.30°N 21.22°E
- Country: Slovakia
- Region: Prešov Region
- District: Bardejov District
- First mentioned: 1277

Area
  - Total: 7.94 km^{2} (3.07 sq mi)
- Elevation: 307 m (1,007 ft)

Population (2025)
  - Total: 756
- Time zone: UTC+1 (CET)
  - Summer (DST): UTC+2 (CEST)
- Postal code: 860 1
- Area code: +421 54
- Vehicle registration plate (until 2022): BJ
- Website: www.mokroluh.sk

Mokroluh is a village and municipality in Bardejov District in the Prešov Region of north-east Slovakia.

== History ==
In the medieval times, Mokroluh was a vassal village and it belonged to the estate Smilno-Makovica. Since 1471 Mokroluh became a property of the city of Bardejov and during the times of Austro-Hungarian monarchy village belonged to Šariš County.

The name of the village changed several times over the course of the centuries. In 1277 it was called Mokurlang, in 1320 Saarpotok, in 1773 Mokroluch, in 1920 Mokroluky and since 1972 Mokroluh. The oldest known seal of the village comes from the second half of the 19th century. It depicts a tree growing on the ground.

In the past Mokroluh was an agrarian village; its inhabitants worked the land, raised cattle and produced shingles (sindle), spinning wheels (kolovratky), and wooden tools. The 1355 report mentions a village mill, confirming that the population grew cereals. In the 1330’ the first church was built in Mokroluh and it has its own pastor. At the end of the 16th century, Mokroluh was a medium–sized village with a vassal population only. The village was caught in a great fire in 1723; however shortly after the fire there were already 52 new homes built. Village artisans soon included blacksmiths and wheel makers. In the middle of the village on a relatively busy road, there was built a blacksmith and carriage workshop. It was a large building used for changing, resting and treating of the horses pulling carriages. The carriage workshop became popular among riders (rurman) because it was also an inn. A replica of Mokroluh's carriage workshop today stands in the open–air museum in Svidnik.

There are only a few old buildings remaining in the village – the Roman Catholic Church from 1772, the chapel from 1826, and the Lutheran bell tower from 1933. Only a few original wooden houses have been preserved and are now slightly altered with revised and redesigned roofs. Several classic wooden and clay storehouses (sypanec) today remain unchanged since they were constructed. Some of them were transformed into holiday cottages.

Modern development began after the liberation of the village 20 January 1945. The citizens themselves repaired a destroyed bridge. Electricity was established in 1956 and in 1958 the first phone line was introduced. In 1959, a single agricultural cooperative (JRD) was created by force. On the foundation of the old carriage workshop a new culture house was built between 1948 and 1952. In the second half of the 1950’ a municipal cinema, library, and amateur theatre led by the local teachers were established there. Today, the cinema does not work, but the library is active, and so is a Mokroluzan folk group, which preserves folk music and dramas from the lives of our ancestors.

== Geography ==
Mokroluh is situated 5 km to the west of Bardejov in the direction of Stará Ľubovňa and Poprad in the valley of the river Topľa in between the Čergov and Low Beskids mountain ranges.

The municipality lies at an altitude of 307 metres (1,007 ft) and covers an area of 7.94 km^{2} (3.07 sq mi) (2025).

== Population ==
Population statistic (10 years)
Year	1995	2005	2015	2025
Count	597	717	730	756
Difference		+20.10%	+1.81%	+3.56%

Population statistic
Year	2024	2025
Count	769	756
Difference		−1.69%

It has a population of 756 people (31 December 2025).

=== Ethnicity ===
Census 2021 (1+ %)
Ethnicity	Number	Fraction
Slovak	757	98.18%
Rusyn	14	1.81%
Chinese	10	1.29%
Czech	8	1.03%
Total	771	

In year 2021 was 771 people by ethnicity 757 as Slovak, 14 as Rusyn, 10 as Chinese, 8 as Czech, 4 as Not found out, 2 as Ukrainian, 1 as Russian and 1 as Other.

Note on population: The difference values of population numbers in the table "Population statistic" and in the sections "Ethnicity" & "Religion" is caused by the use of various statistical methods.

=== Religion ===
Census 2021 (1+ %)
Religion	Number	Fraction
Roman Catholic Church	341	44.23%
Evangelical Church	272	35.28%
Church of the Brethren	70	9.08%
Greek Catholic Church	43	5.58%
None	24	3.11%
Eastern Orthodox Church	8	1.04%
Total	771	

In year 2021 was 771 people by religion 341 from Roman Catholic Church, 272 from Evangelical Church, 70 from Church of the Brethren, 43 from Greek Catholic Church, 24 from None, 8 from Eastern Orthodox Church, 6 from Not found out, 4 from Christian Congregations in Slovakia, 2 from Buddhism and 1 from Ad hoc movements.
