= Horná Orava Protected Landscape Area =

Protected area in Slovakia

Horná Orava Protected Landscape Area CHKO Horná Orava
- IUCN category V (protected landscape/seascape)
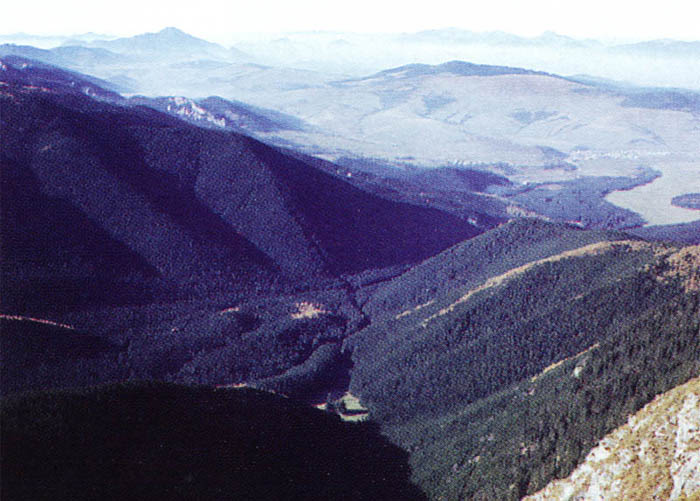
- Oravská Magura Mts.
- Interactive map of Horná Orava Protected Landscape Area; CHKO Horná Orava
- Location: Northern Slovakia
- Coordinates: 49°34′N 19°30′E
- Area: 587.38 km^{2} (226.79 mi^{2})
- Established: 24 September 1979
- Governing body: Správa CHKO Horná Orava (Horná Orava PLA administration) in Námestovo

Horná Orava Protected Landscape Area (Slovak: Chránená krajinná oblasť Horná Orava) is one of the 14 protected landscape areas in Slovakia. It is situated in the Námestovo and Tvrdošín districts, within the Orava region.

== History ==
The park was created on 24 September 1979 and the law creating it was amended on 29 September 2003.

== Geography, geology and biology ==
It is made of Oravská Magura, Podbeskydská vrchovina and Oravské Beskydy mountains, and the Orava Basin, as well as the Orava Dam, in the northernmost Slovakia. Much of the PLA's territory is made from sandstone mountain ranges. More than half of the area is covered by forests. Beech and fir trees grow in the area, along with strong presence of the spruce monoculture. Exceptions are the areas under Babia hora, Paráč and Pilsko mountains, with old growth spruce with rowan trees being represented. A specific phenomenon of the park are the peat bogs, represented by the pine woods, providing shelter for many threatened species. The Orava Dam is a nesting place for many rare species of birds. The highest mountain is Babia hora at the border with Poland at 1,722.9 m (5,653 ft)
