= Żywiec Basin =

Coordinates: 49°41′N 19°10′E

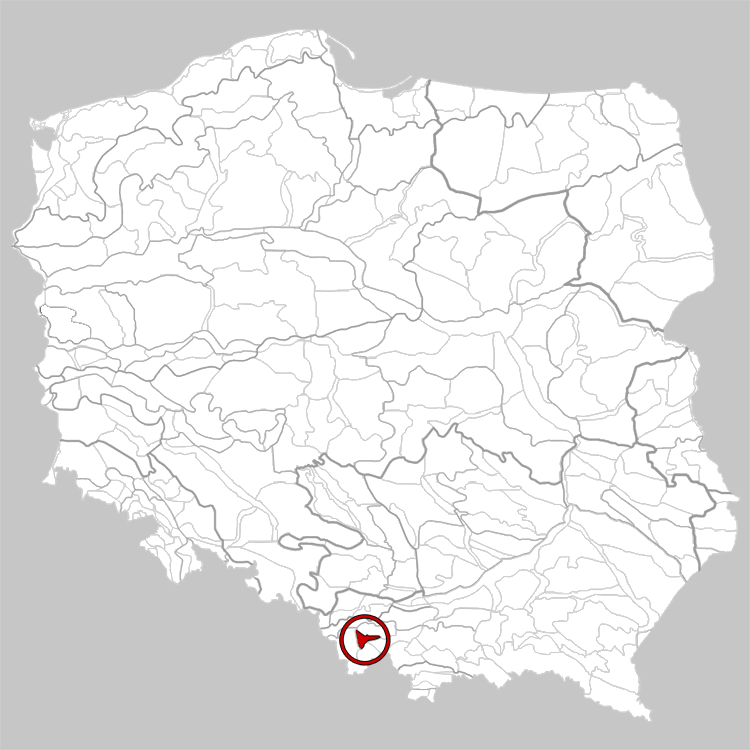
Żywiec Basin highlighted in red

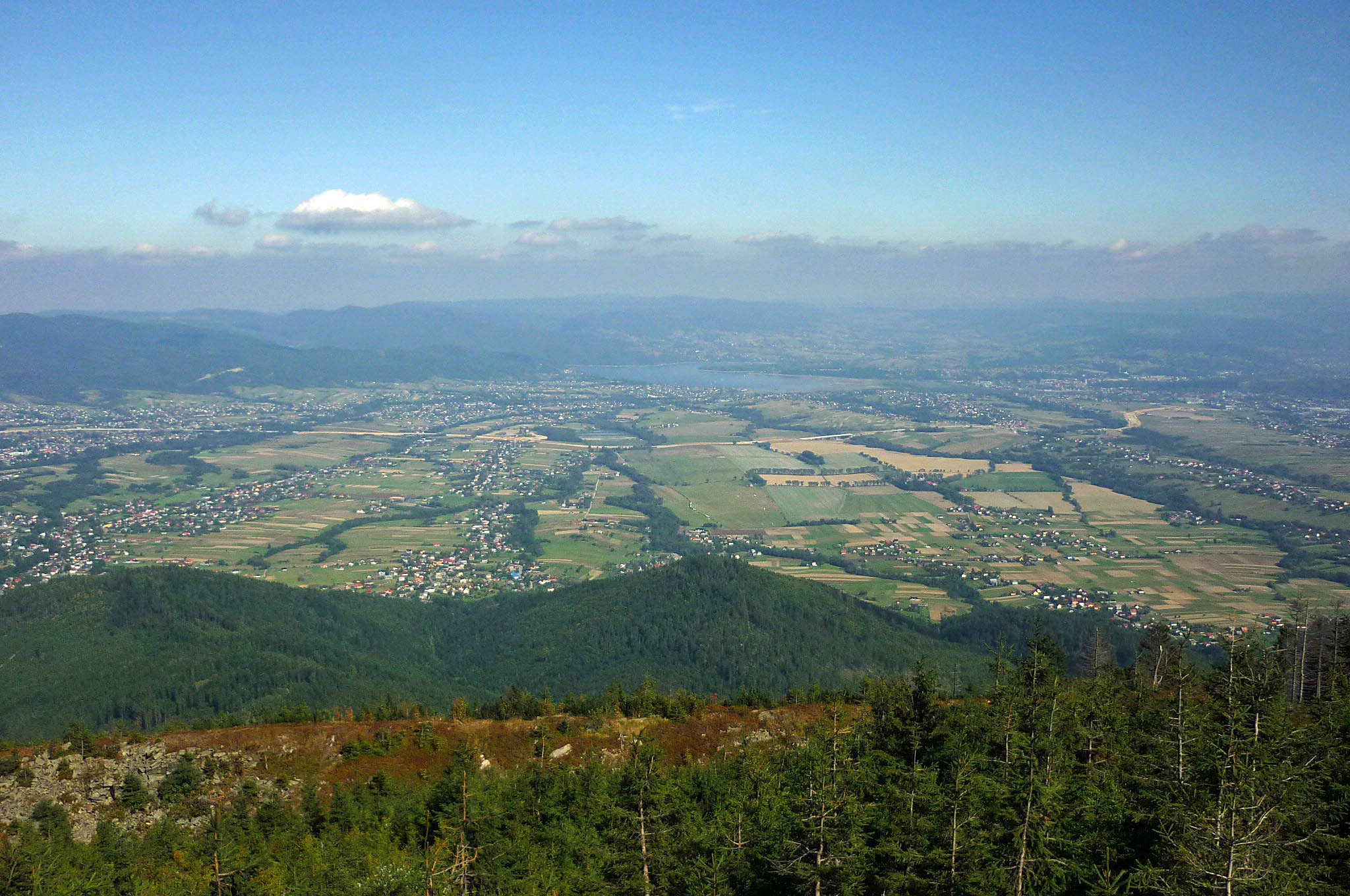
Żywiec Basin seen from Skrzyczne

Żywiec Basin (Polish: Kotlina Żywiecka) is a lowland, located in southern Poland, between the Little Beskids to the north, Silesian Beskids to the west, Żywiec Beskids to the south and east, and Maków Beskids to the east. It has the size of around 320 km^{2} (120 sq mi). It is centered on the confluences of the rivers Koszarawa and Żylica with Soła close to the town of Żywiec, whence the name of the basin is derived from.
