= Little Beskids Landscape Park =

Protected area in Poland

Coordinates: 49°45′28″N 19°19′29″E

- Park Krajobrazowy Beskidu Małego
- IUCN category V (protected landscape/seascape)
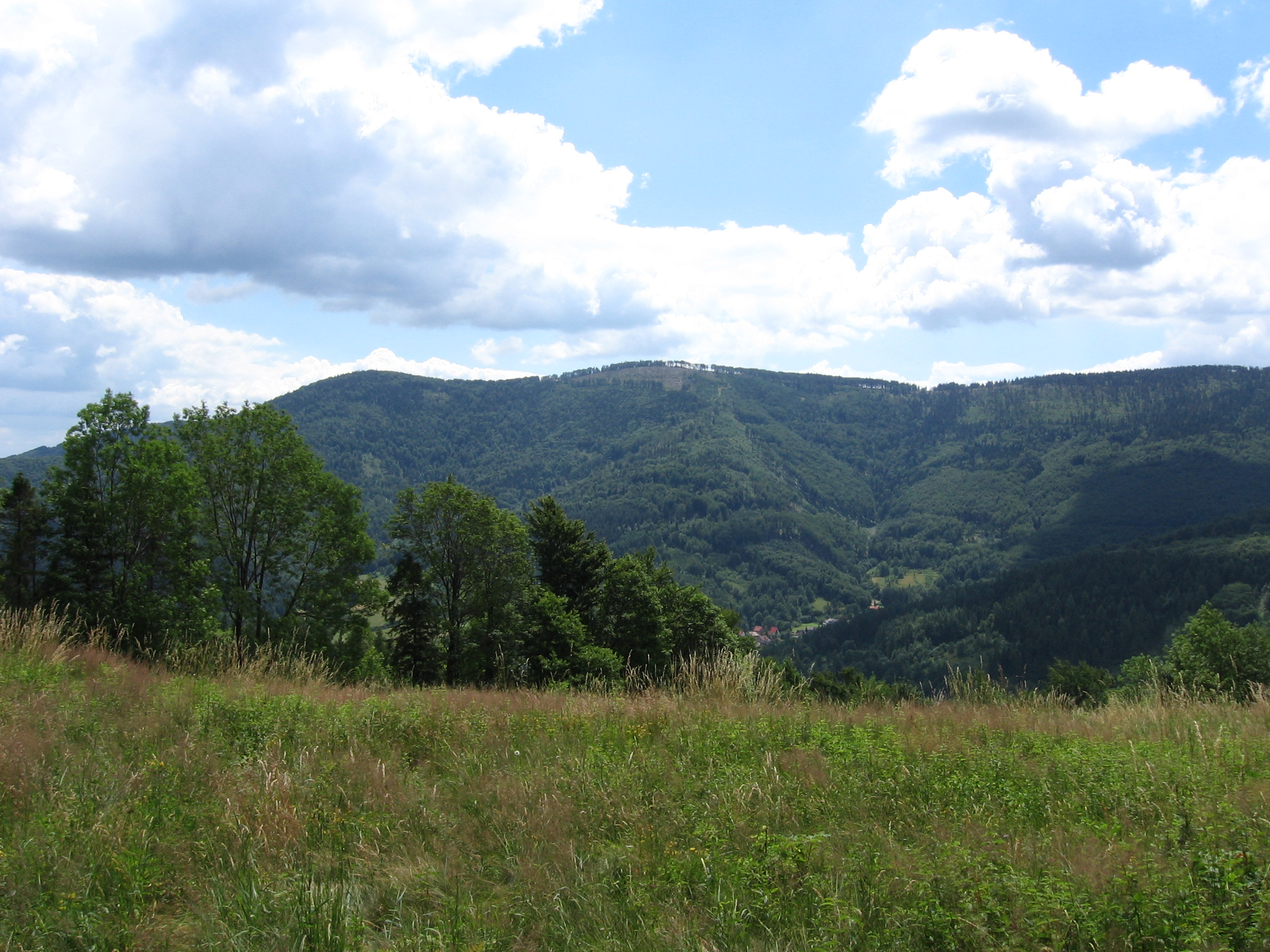
- Czupel
- Interactive map of Little Beskids Landscape Park
- Location: south Poland
- Area: 257.7 km^{2} (99.5 sq mi)
- Established: 1998

Little Beskids Landscape Park (Park Krajobrazowy Beskidu Małego) is a protected area (Landscape Park) in southern Poland, established in 1998, covering an area of 257.7 square kilometres (99.5 sq mi). It lies within the Little Beskids mountain range. Its highest peak is Czupel, at 933 metres (3,061 ft).

The Park is shared between two voivodeships, Silesian and Lesser Poland (Malopolska). It spans between Andrychów in the north, Skawa Valley in the east, and the village of Krzeszów in the south.
