= Central section of the Western Beskids =

Set of mountain ranges on the Polish and Slovak border

Coordinates: 49°20′N 19°13′E

Central section of the Western Beskids, marked in red and labeled with letter G

Central section of the Western Beskids (Slovak: Stredné Beskydy; Czech: Střední část Západních Beskyd; Polish: Środkowa część Beskidów Zachodnich) are a set of mountain ranges spanning the southern Polish and northern Slovak border. They constitute a section of the Western Beskids, within the Outer Western Carpathians.

In geographic classification, the term Beskid Mountains has several definitions, related to distinctive historical and linguistic traditions. Depending on a particular classification, designation Central in relation to the Beskids is also used with different meanings. In Slovak terminology, the term Central Beskids (Slovak: Stredné Beskydy) is used to designate this section of the Beskid Mountains within the Outer Western Carpathians. In Polish terminology, the same region is also classified as the central section of the Western Beskids, but not under the term Central Beskids (Polish: Beskidy Środkowe), since that term is used to designate Lower Beskids of the Outer Eastern Carpathians.

== Subdivision ==
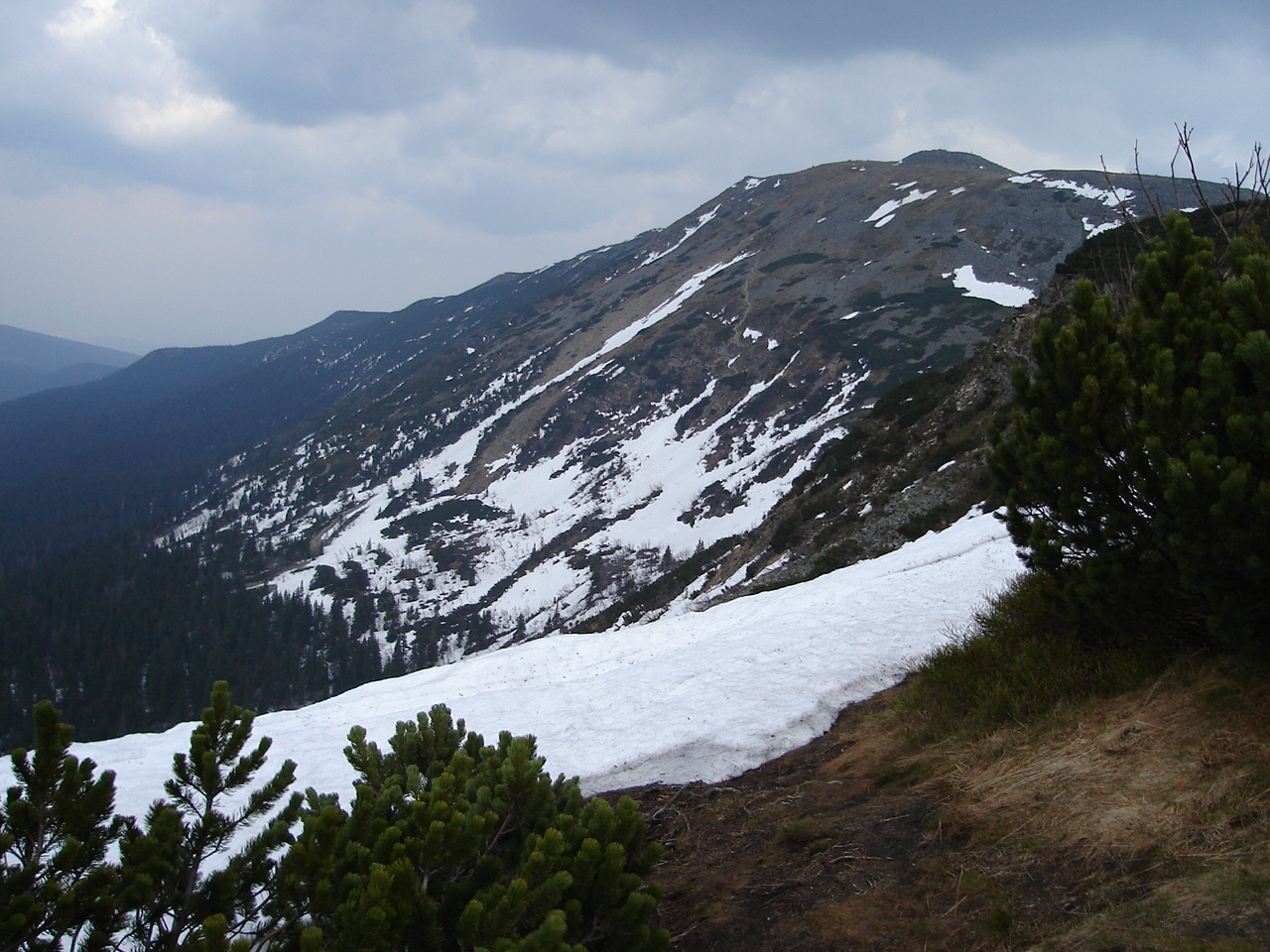
Babia Góra, the highest peak of the Orava Beskids in Slovakia

The Central section of the Western Beskids consist of the following sets of mountain ranges:

- Orava Beskids (SK: Oravské Beskydy) + Żywiec Beskids (PL: Beskid Żywiecki) (the older SK equivalent of Beskid Zywiecki is "Slovenské Beskydy"- Slovak Beskids or "Kysucko-oravské Beskydy"- Kysuce-Orava Beskids)
- Kysuce Beskids (SK: Kysucké Beskydy) +Żywiec Beskids (PL: Beskid Żywiecki) (the older SK equivalent of Beskid Zywiecki is "Slovenské Beskydy" or "Kysucko-oravské Beskydy")
- Kysuce Highlands (SK: Kysucká vrchovina)
- Orava Magura (SK: Oravská Magura)
- Orava Highlands (SK: Oravská vrchovina)
- Sub-Beskidian Furrow (SK: Podbeskydská brázda)
- Sub-Beskidian Highlands (SK: Podbeskydská vrchovina)

== See also ==
- Divisions of the Carpathians
- Outer Western Carpathians
- Western Beskids
- Eastern section of the Western Beskids

== Sources ==
- Földvary, Gábor Z. (1988). Geology of the Carpathian Region. Singapore: World Scientific Publishing Company. ISBN 9789813103825.
- Kondracki, Jerzy (1977). Regiony fizycznogeograficzne Polski. Warszawa: Wydawa Uniwersytetu Warszawskiego.
- Kondracki, Jerzy (1989). Problemy standaryzacji nazw geograficznych. Warszawa: Instytut Geografii i Przestrzennego Zagospodarowania PWN.
- Kondracki, Jerzy (2000) [1998]. Geografia regionalna Polski (2. ed.). Warszawa: Wydawnictwo Naukowe PWN. ISBN 9788301130503.
