= Pilsko =

Mountain in Poland and Slovakia

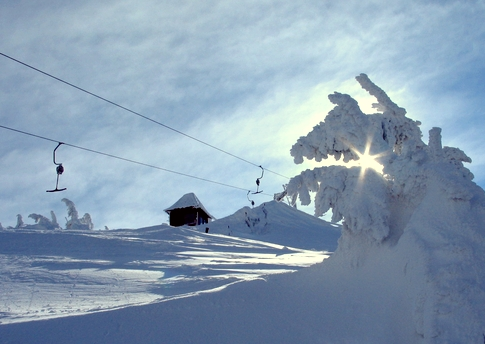
- Cable car station on the Pilsko

Highest point
- Elevation: 1,556 m (5,105 ft)
- Prominence: 748 m (2,454 ft)
- Coordinates: 49°31′38″N 19°19′06″E

Geography
- Location within Silesian Voivodeship Location within Slovakia
- Location: Slovakia - Poland
- Parent range: Żywiec Beskids

Pilsko is the second highest mountain of the Żywiec Beskids (Oravské Beskydy in Slovakia) mountain range, near the border between Poland and Slovakia. It rises to an altitude of 1,556 meters (5,105 ft) and is a hiking destination in summer and a skiing area in winter. The name Pilsko is frequently used not only to describe the main peak, which lies in Slovakia, but also the whole range. The mountain lies not only on the border between the two nations, it also marks the European Watershed.

== Etymology ==
Origins of the name of Pilsko are not known, it might have been named after an 18th-century owner of local meadows, named Piela. There are several other theories, scholar A. Siemionow claims that Pilsko is a distorted, Slovak version of the word Poland. The name first appears in 1721 in the Historia naturalis curiosa Regni Poloniae, Magni Ducatus Litvaniae, annexarumque provinciarum, in tractatus XX divisa, written by Gabriel Rzączyński, who also was first reported man to climb the mountain.

== History and geography ==
The upper part of Pilsko is flat and made of limestone, covered by grass and mountain pine. On the northeastern slope, along yellow tourist trail, there is a cross, commemorating one of the first victims of the 1939 Invasion of Poland, a Border Defence Corps Corporal, Franciszek Basik.

In 1967, the government of Czechoslovakia created a nature reserve in Slovak side of Pilsko, with an area of 809 hectares. The Polish nature reserve, created in 1971, covers 105 hectares. The peak provides views of the Western Beskids, the Tatras, and sometimes the eastern slopes of the Sudetes. Two skiing centers operate on slopes in the area of Korbielów. In the 1990s more than 10 hectares of forests were cleared for construction of ski trails, which resulted in protests of ecological organizations both from Poland, and former Czechoslovakia. Pilsko has a tourist mountain hut, 1,330 metres (4,360 ft) above sea level, near a junction of hiking trails.

== Accident ==
Pilsko was the site of a 1980 incident, when a group of athletes with their coach were lost in a blizzard and fog, resulting in three boys dying of hypothermia.
