= Beskidian Foothills =

Beskidian Foothills or Beskidian Piedmont may refer to:

- West Beskidian Foothills, a foothill region, adjacent to the Western Beskids
- Central Beskidian Foothills, a foothill region, adjacent to the Central Beskids
- Beskidian Southern Foothills, a foothill region of the Central Beskids

== See also ==
- Central Beskids (disambiguation)
- Eastern Beskids (disambiguation)
- Beskid (disambiguation)
