= Beskid Sądecki =

- Location of Beskid Sądecki, marked by red color and labeled with h1

Highest point
- Peak: Radziejowa
- Elevation: 1,262 m (4,140 ft)
- Coordinates: 49°27′N 20°45′E

Geography
- Countries: Poland and Slovakia
- States: Lesser Poland Voivodeship and Prešov Region

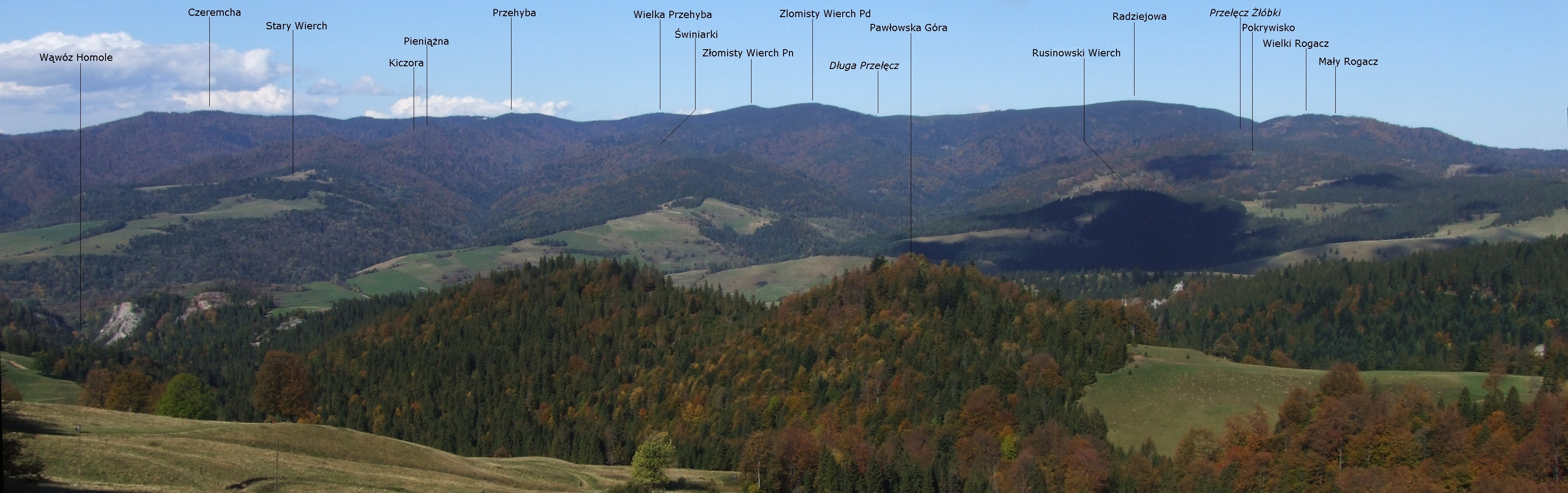
Radziejowej Range

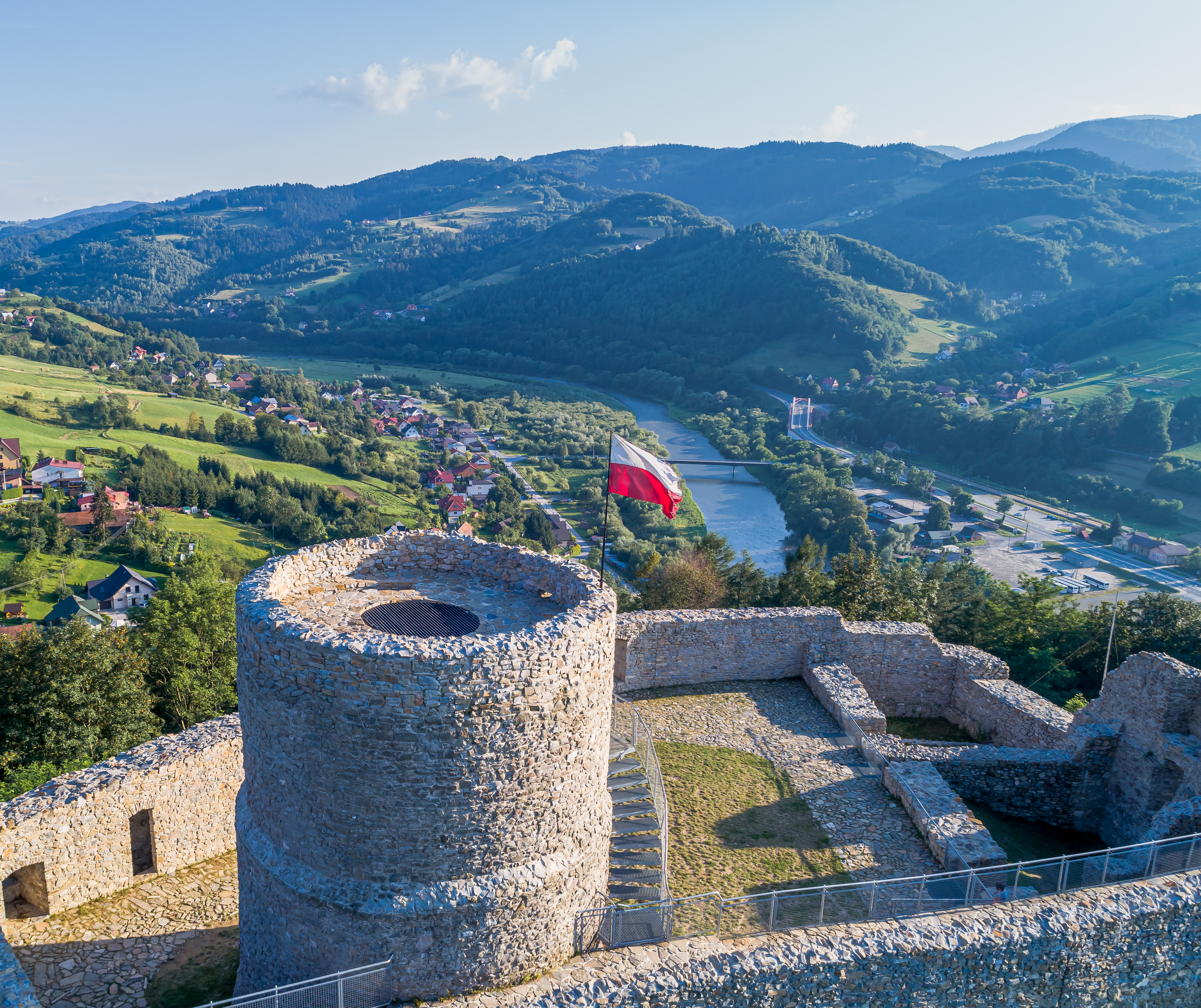
Panorama of the Beskid Sądecki from the Castle in Rytro

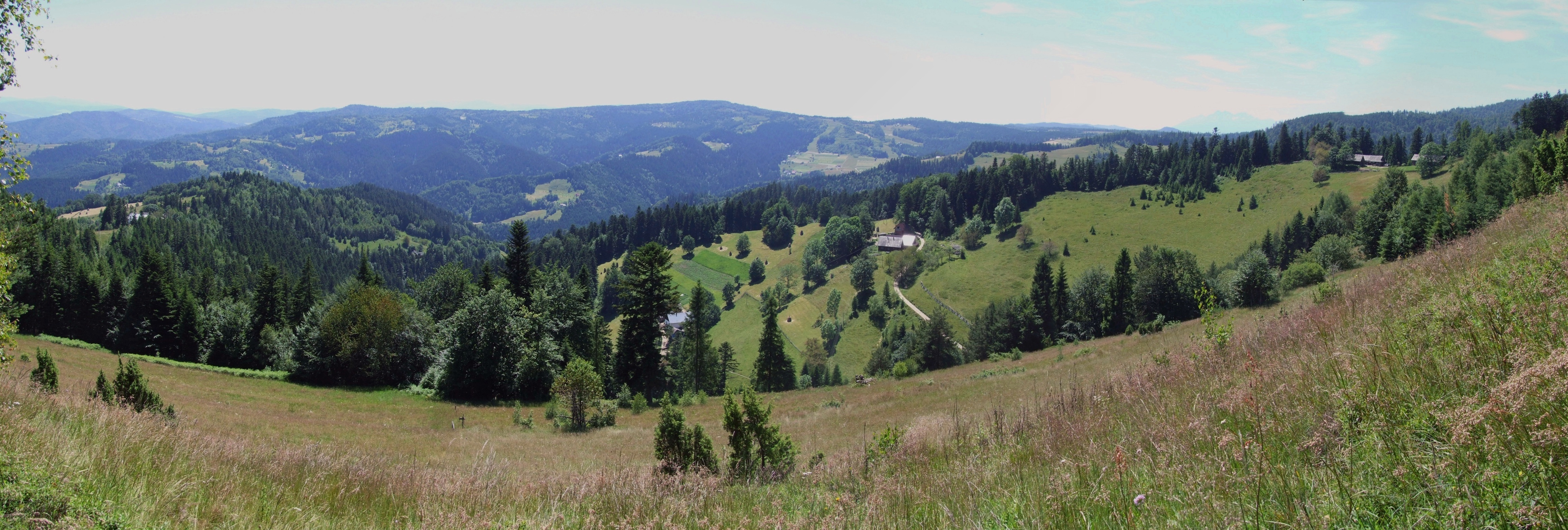
View from the village house of Niemcowa on the Jaworzyny Range

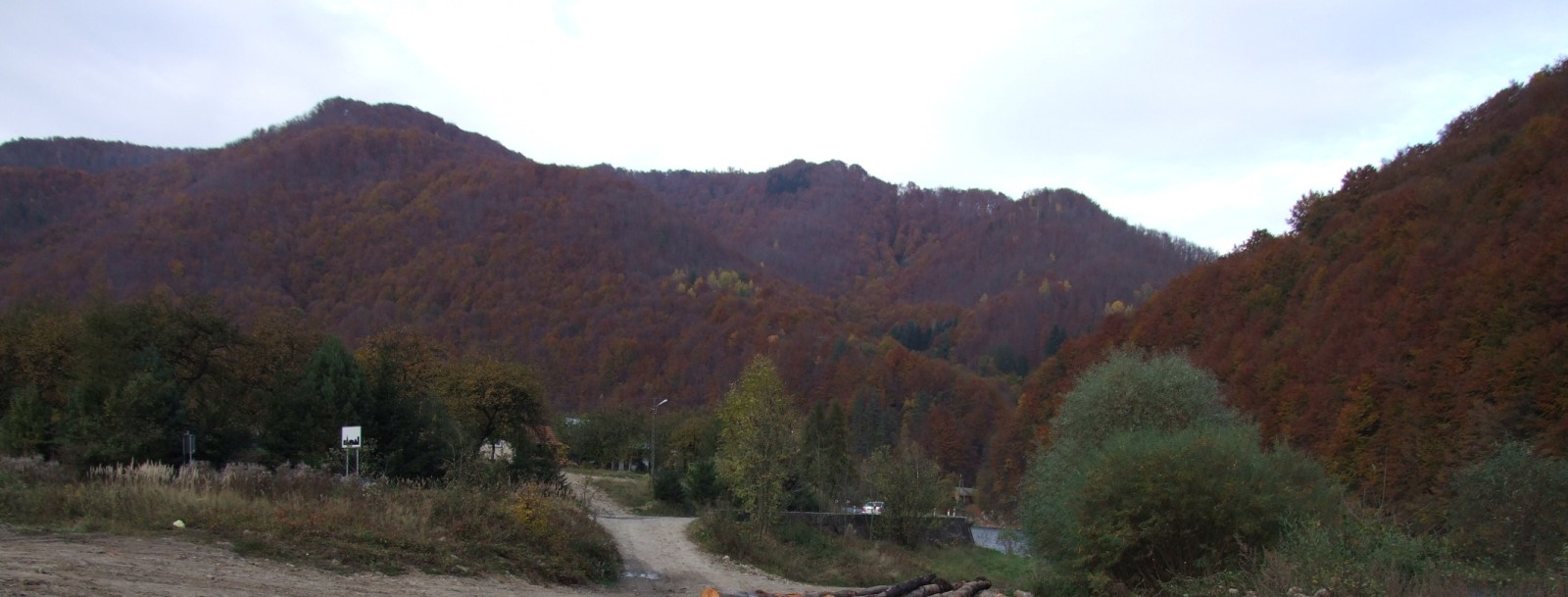
Autumn in the Beskid Sądecki

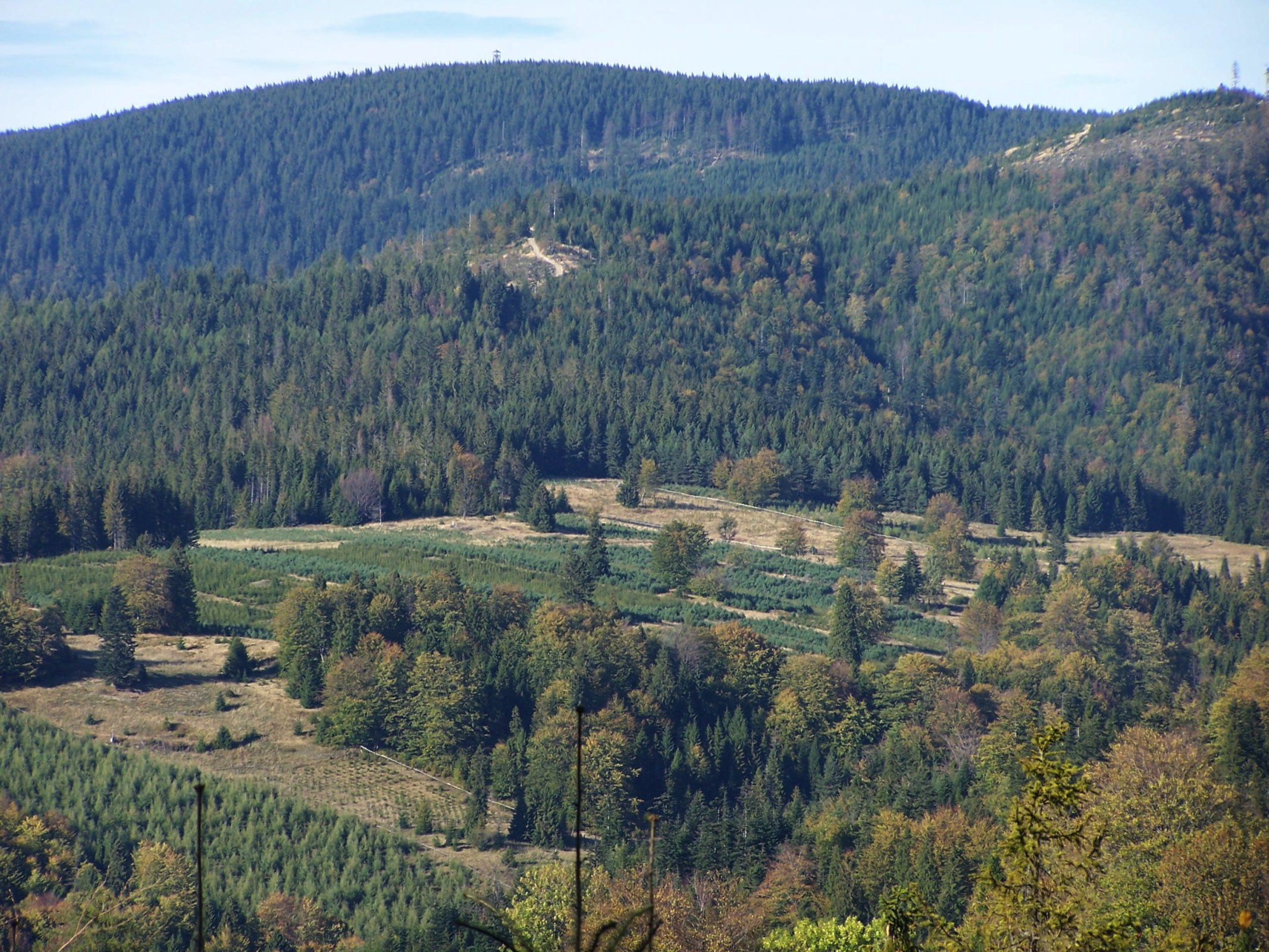
Radziejowej Massif

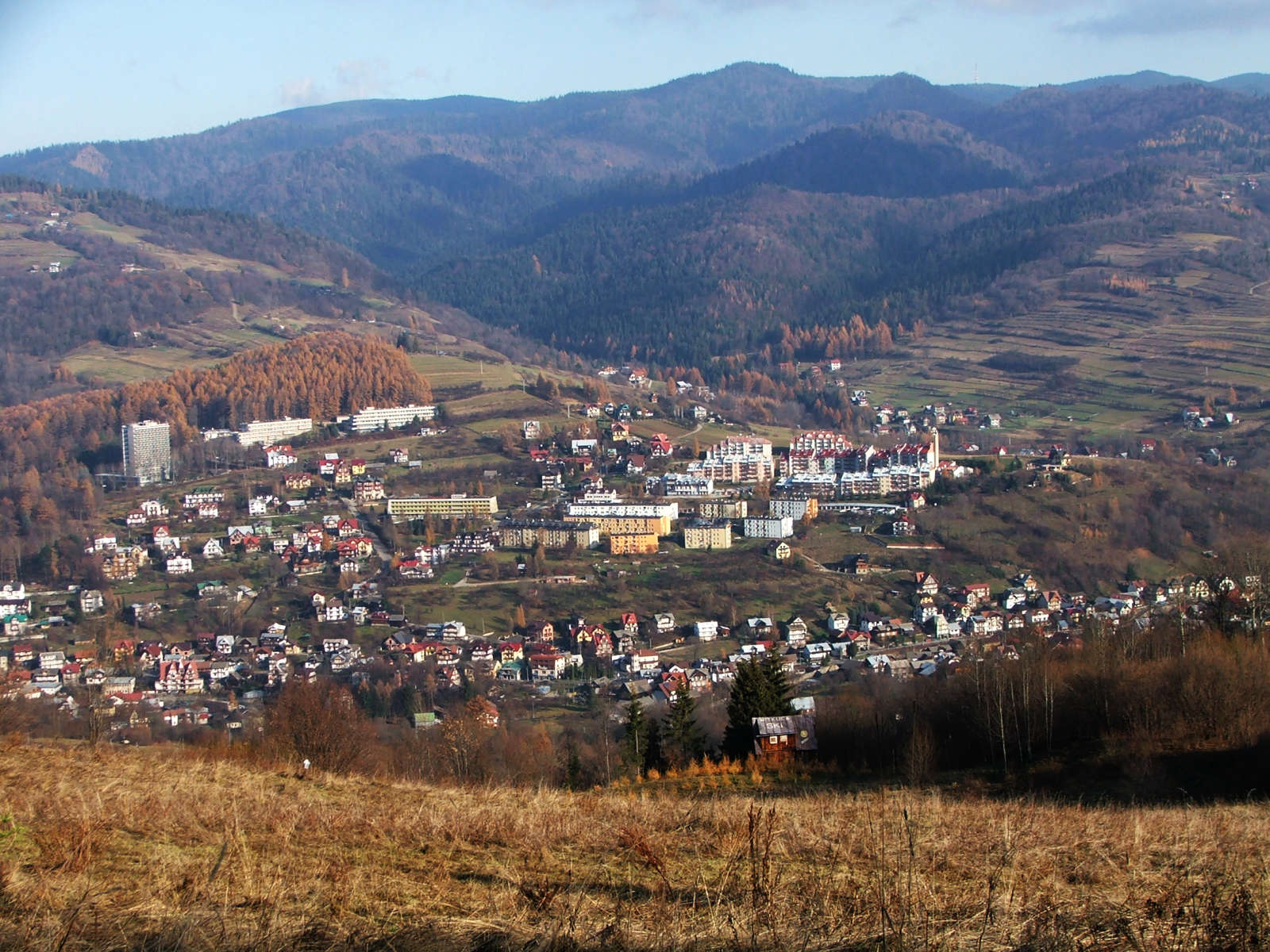
Beskid Sądecki from the Małe Pieniny

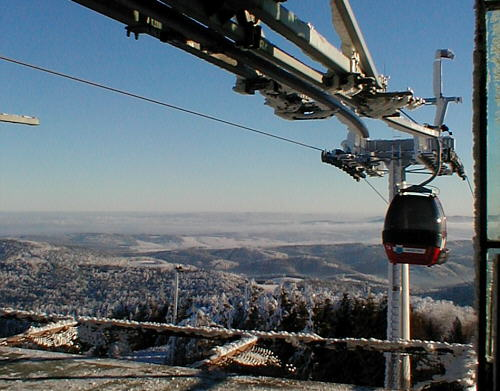
Gondola lift to the Jaworzyna

Beskid Sądecki is a mountain range in the eastern section of the Western Beskids, within the Outer Western Carpathians. It is located in the border region between Poland and Slovakia. On the Polish side, it stretches along an area of 670 km², between the Dunajec river in the west and the valleys of the Kamienica Nawojowska river, Mochnaczka, Muszynka, Przełęcz Tylicka in the east. The highest peak of the mountain range is Radziejowa at 1262 metres. The mountains are built from flysch rocks.

== Topography ==
The Beskid Sądecki links with three other mountain ranges:

- Jaworzyny Range
- Radziejowej Range
- Leluchowskie Mountains

According to Slovak geographers, Beskid Sądecki is part of Ľubovnianska vrchovina. The separation of the ranges was done by Poland, during the regionalisation of mountains made by Jerzy Kondracki, which the mountain range is named by in Slovakia. Some Polish geographers state that the Slovak part of the Radziejowej Range can be linked with the Ľubovnianska vrchovina, the name Lubowelskie Upland is also used. According to these Polish geographers the names Radziejowej Range and Ľubovnianska vrchovina are only used when explaining the border, and should actually be one mountain range. This overview of the separation of one mountain range is not primarily discussed by other Polish geographers who believe that the Slovak mountain range should be treated as a separate physio-geographic region.

The divided valley of Poprad is divided into two groups. In the North-Eastern and Eastern part of Poprad can be found in the Jaworzyny Range and Ľubovnianska vrchovina, and in the South-Western and Western parts lies the Polish Radziejowej Range and the Slovak range. The Slovak range is generally called the Lubawelski Mountains from the Slovak name Ľubovnianska vrchovina, although according to Slovak geographers this mountain range refers to a different region which is different from the Polish geographers. According to other Polish geographers Radziejowej Range and Lubawelski Mountains are only referred to the border, but are actually a mountain range. In Kondracki's files the whole Beskid Sądecki is actually part of the Ľubovnianska vrchovina. The agreed boundary between the Radziejowej Range and the Slovak range is carried through the valley from Poprad of the river Czercz, through Gromadzka Mountain Pass and the valley of the stream Wielki Lipnik.

In the Radziejowej Range is the highest peak of the Beskid Sądecki, where Radziejowa and all other peaks pass 1200 metres. In the Jaworzyny Range only Jaworzyna Krynicka has a height of 1114 metres and Wielka Bukowa at 1104 metres have a height over 1100 metres.

Both parts of the Beskid Sądecki have a characteristic of a mountain range with a main peak with side ridges coming off with smaller peaks on the sides of the peak. The peaks are mainly similar, excluding the Radziejowej Range and Jaworzyny Range, which can be characterised slightly abnormal in their formation when compared to the surrounding shapes of the mountain ranges. The region has large amounts of forests. The mountain range has not got large amounts of fields when not counting the settlements around the mountain range's footsteps in the area of the mountain range.

== Boundaries ==
According to the regionalisation by Jerzy Konradzki of physio-geographic Poland from the West of Beskid Sądecki is the valley of the Dunajec which separates the mountain range from the Gorce Mountains, and from the North-Western point from the Island Beskids. From the North the range borders the Sądecka Structural Basin. In the North-Western point the range neighbours Kamienica Nawojowska valley, Krzyżówka Mountain Pass, Mochnaczka, the Northern part of Muszynki valley and Tylicka Mountain Pass are the border with the Low Beskids mountains. The South-Western border with the Pieniny is made by the Dunajec, the Grajcarek valley, Biała Woda and Rozdziela Mountain Pass, the limestone rocks in the Northern part of the river bed of the Biała Woda, mean that actually this region should belong to the Małe Pieniny. On the Slovak side of the mountain range from the Rozdziela Mountain Pass the border lies through the valley of the streams Rozdziel and Wielkie Lipki, when the steep South-Eastern ridges of the Čergov mountain range links with the Spišsko-šarišské medzihorie. The Southern border with the Leluchowskie Mountains and Čergov mountain range makes the Smereczek stream in the valley, and later the ridge carves out the river basin for the river Topľa.

== Waters ==
The region of Beskid Sądecki belongs to the Dunajec river basin which belongs to the drainage divide of the Baltic Sea. The only other large river which lies in the region is the Poprad, when the Dunajec flows from the West and South, forming the border of the mountain range. All of the streams flow from the top of the mountains which then flow down the valleys onto the sides of the ridges. They are all directly coming from the Dunajec or the Poprad which then link up to the smaller rivers outside of the region, such as the rivers of Grajcarek, Kamienica and Muszynka. In the Beskid Sądecki mountain range there are not many artificial water reservoirs, there are small barrier lakes on the ridges, an example of is the Młaka which is located in the Baniska Natural Reserve.
