= Eastern section of the Western Beskids =

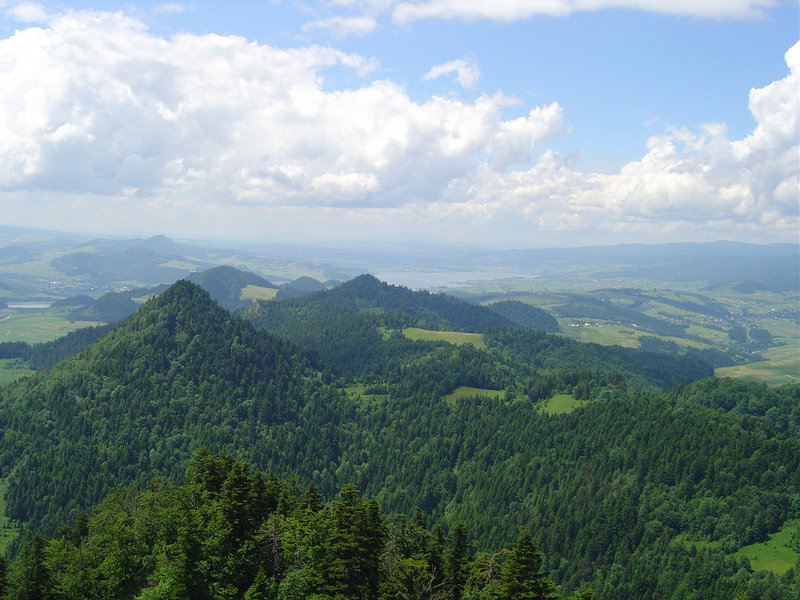
- View of the nearby Pieniny from the summit of Three Crowns

Highest point
- Peak: Radziejowa
- Elevation: 1,266 m (4,154 ft)
- Coordinates: 49°26′56″N 20°36′15″E

Naming
- Native name: Východné Beskydy (Slovak)

Geography
- Eastern section of the Western Beskids (marked in red)
- Countries: Slovakia and Poland
- Regions: Prešov and Lesser Poland
- Parent range: Outer Western Carpathians
- Borders on: Podhale-Magura Area, (Polish) Western Beskids and Low Beskids

Eastern section of the Western Beskids (Czech: Východní část Západních Beskyd) are a set of mountain ranges spanning the southern Polish and northern Slovak border. They constitute an eastern section of the Western Beskids, within the Outer Western Carpathians.

In geographic classification, the term Beskid Mountains has several definitions, related to distinctive historical and linguistic traditions. Depending on a particular classification, designation Eastern in relation to the Beskids is also used with different meanings. In Slovak terminology, the term Eastern Beskids (Slovak: Východné Beskydy) is used to designate the eastern section of the Western Beskids. In Polish terminology, the same region is also classified as the eastern section of the Western Beskids, but not under the term Eastern Beskids (Polish: Beskidy Wschodnie), since that term is used to designate Eastern Beskids of the Outer Eastern Carpathians.

== Subdivisions ==
The Eastern section of the Western Beskids consist of:

- Beskid Sądecki (Polish: Beskid Sądecki) + Ľubovňa Highlands (Slovak: Ľubovnianska vrchovina)
- Čergov (Polish: Góry Czerchowskie; Slovak: Čergov)
- Pieniny (Polish: Pieniny; Slovak: Pieniny)

== See also ==
- Divisions of the Carpathians
- Outer Western Carpathians
- Western Beskids
- Central section of the Western Beskids

== Sources ==
- Földvary, Gábor Z. (1988). Geology of the Carpathian Region. Singapore: World Scientific Publishing Company. ISBN 9789813103825.
- Kondracki, Jerzy (1977). Regiony fizycznogeograficzne Polski. Warszawa: Wydawa Uniwersytetu Warszawskiego.
- Kondracki, Jerzy (1989). Problemy standaryzacji nazw geograficznych. Warszawa: Instytut Geografii i Przestrzennego Zagospodarowania PWN.
- Kondracki, Jerzy (2000) [1998]. Geografia regionalna Polski (2. ed.). Warszawa: Wydawnictwo Naukowe PWN. ISBN 9788301130503.
