= Kysucké Beskydy =

Set of mountain ranges in Slovakia

Coordinates: 49°25′N 18°58′E

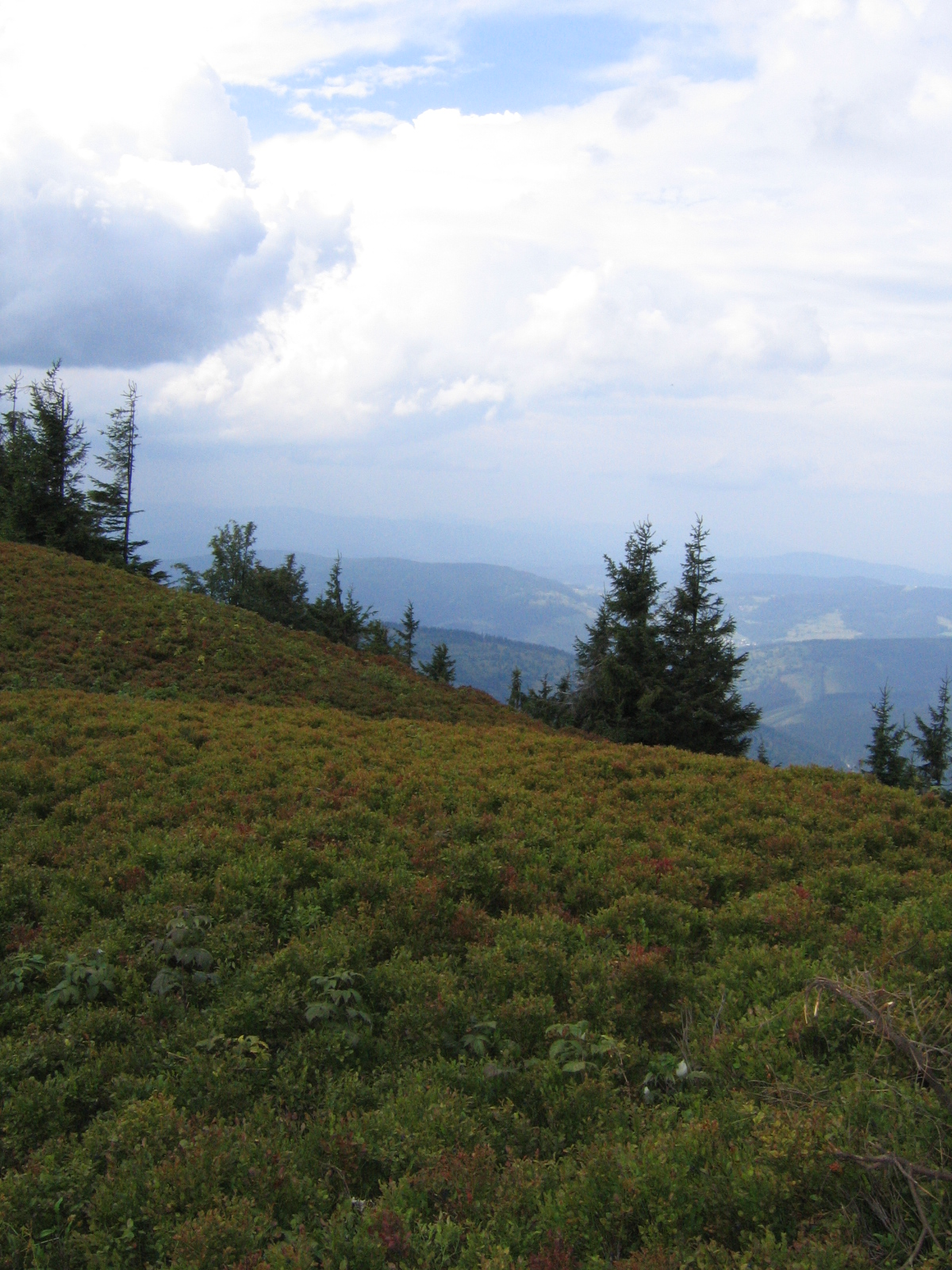
a view of the Veľká Rača

The Kysucké Beskydy is a set of mountain ranges in the Kysuce region of northern Slovakia. Slovaks consider the mountains to belong to the Central Beskids, of the Outer Western Carpathians, while Poles classify them as part of the Western Beskids.

The highest peak of these ranges is Veľká Rača, at 1,236 meters. Most of the area is heavily forested, with some endangered species, and a large part of these ranges fall within the Kysuce Protected Landscape Area.
