= Orava Highlands =

Mountain range in Slovakia

Coordinates: 49°12′56″N 19°28′13″E

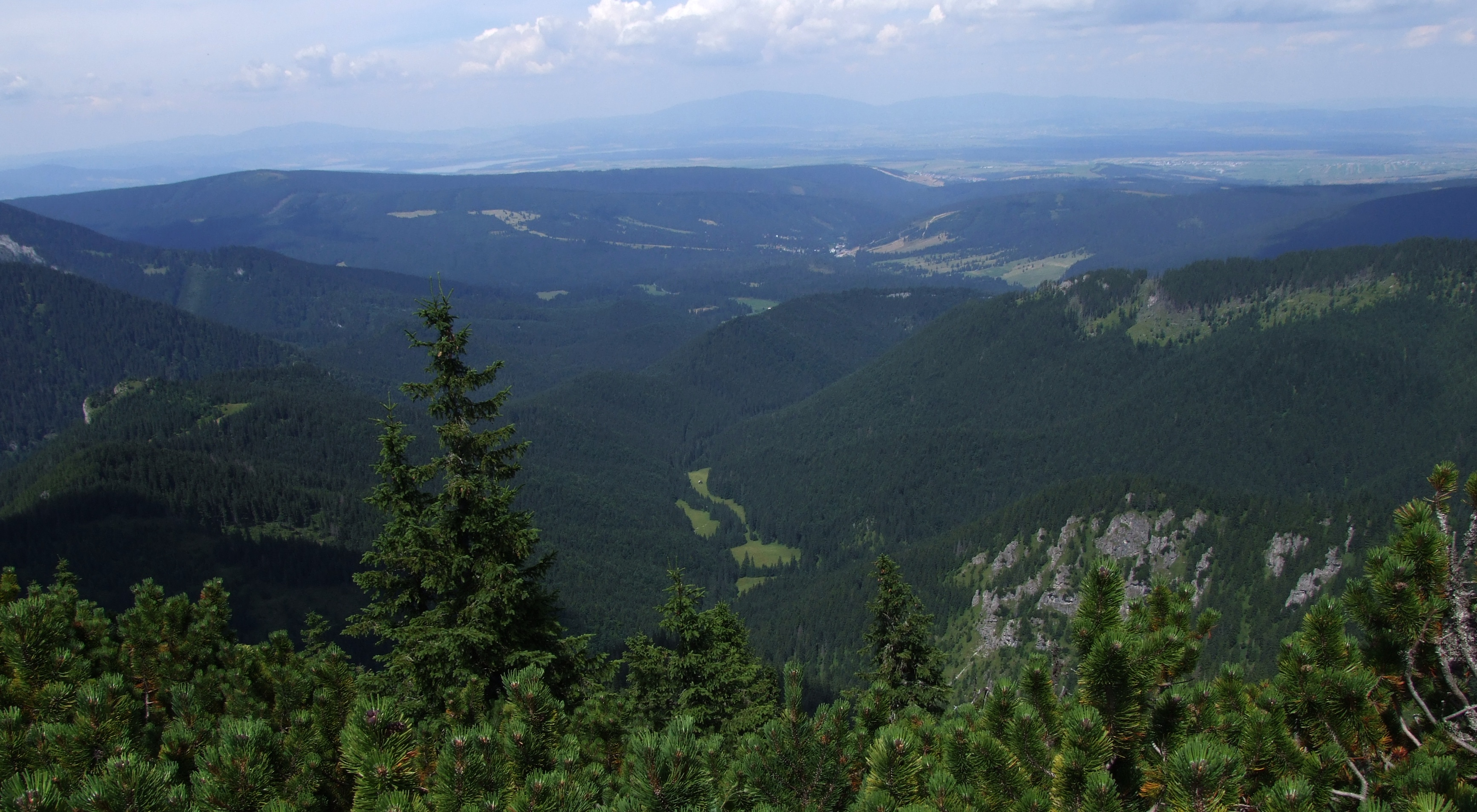
Orava Highlands

The Orava Highlands (in Slovak, Oravská vrchovina) is a range of small mountains in the Žilina Region of north central Slovakia, part of the Outer Western Carpathians. In Slovakia these hills are considered part of the Central Beskids; in Poland they're considered Western Beskids.

The highlands stretch along both sides of the Orava River, and cover an area about 220 square kilometers. It consists of two smaller areas: the Podchočská brázda (the Podchočská furrow) and the Veličnianska kotlina (Veličnianska basin).

The highest of the relatively modest summits are Kopec (1251 meters), Machy (1202 meters) and Mnich (1110 meters), the last of which towers over the ski resort town of Zuberec. Geologically the highlands are composed of Carpathian flysch and the limestone unique to the Pieniny Klippen Belt.
