= Island Beskids =

Polish mountain range

Coordinates: 49°39′19″N 20°16′36″E

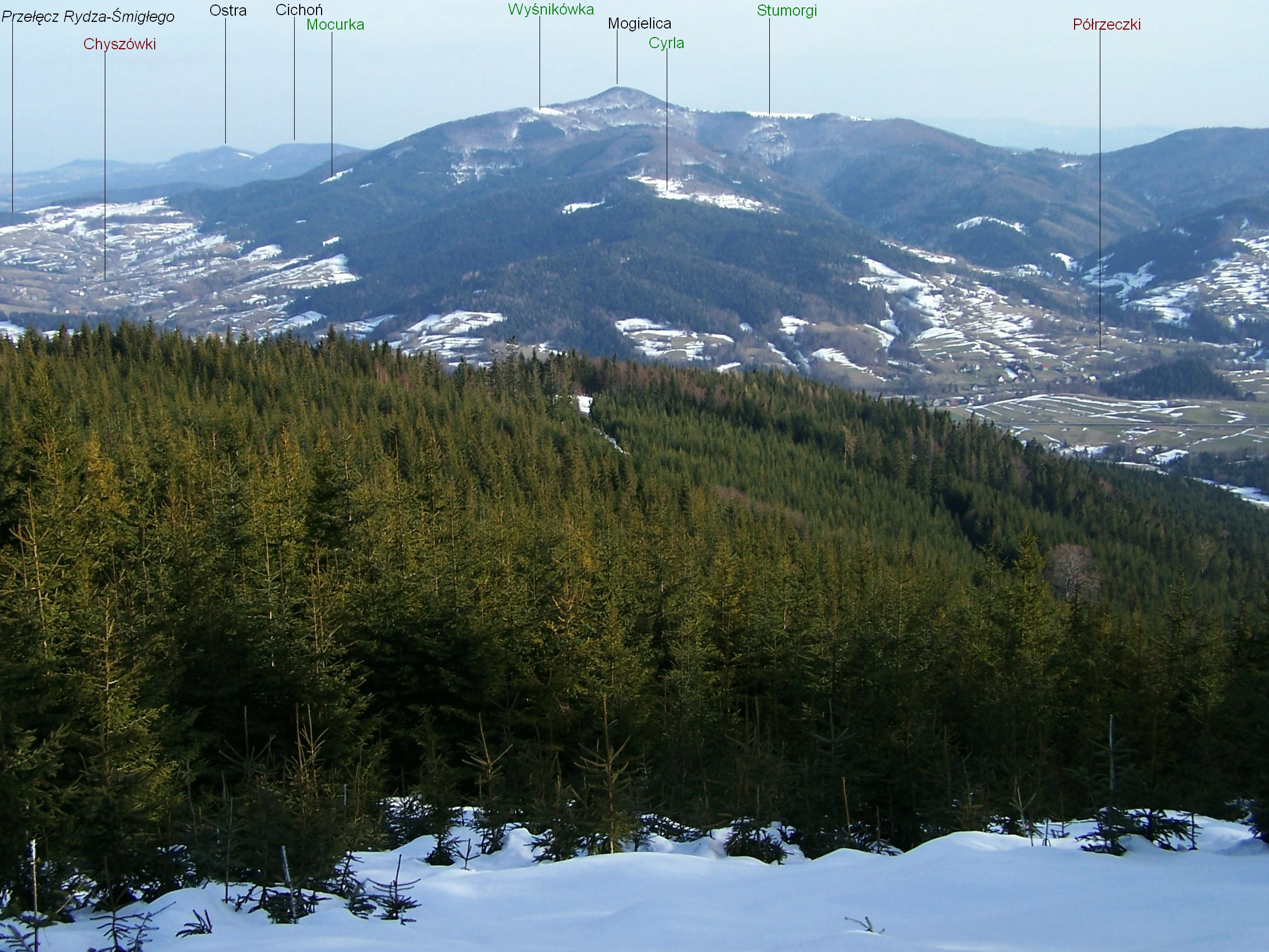
Highest peak, Mogielica (top centre)

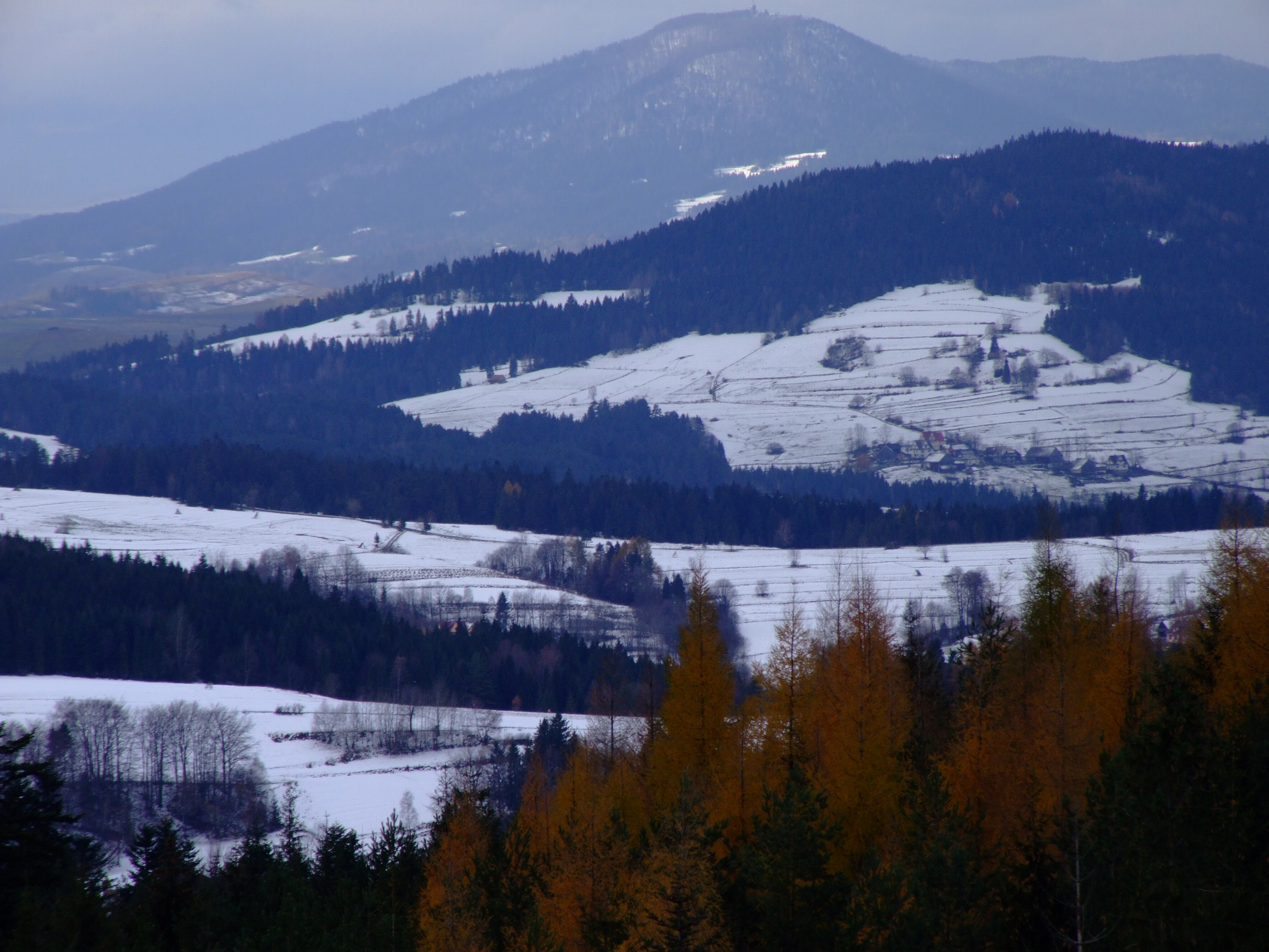
Luboń Wielki (Great Luboń)

The Island Beskids (in Polish, Beskid Wyspowy) is a mountain range in southern Poland, part of the Western Beskids of the Outer Western Carpathians, with significant natural resources, folk culture, medieval history, and developing resources for tourism.

The distinctive feature of this region is its isolated, individual peaks, from which derives its name. The highest peak is Mogielica (1170 meters). Other major peaks include Ćwilin (1072 meters), Jasien (1052 meters), Modyń (1029 meters), Luboń Wielki (1022 meters), and Krzystonów (1012 meters).

Natural reserves in the range include:

- Białowodzka Mountain Nature Reserve
- Kamionna Nature Reserve
- Kostrza Nature Reserve
- Luboń Wielki Nature Reserve
- Mogielica Nature Reserve (established March 12, 2011)
- Śnieżnica Nature Reserve

Villages in the range include Szczyrzyc.
