= Orava Magura =

Mountain range in Slovakia

Coordinates: 49°17′N 19°20′E

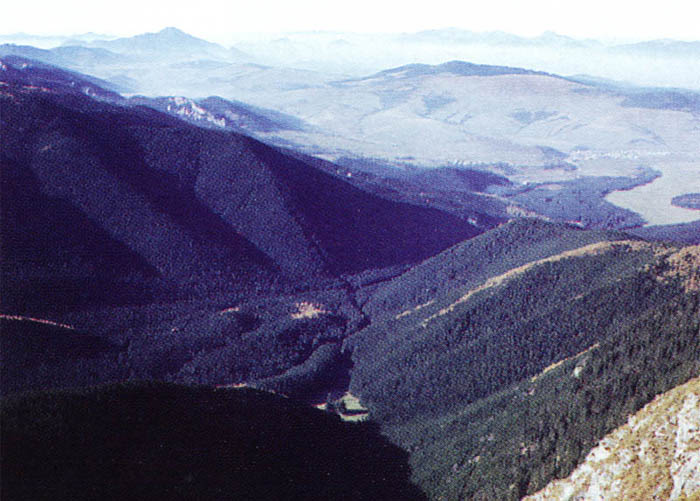
Orava Magura

The Orava Magura (Slovak: Oravská Magura, Hungarian: Árvai-Magura) is a mountain range in the Outer Western Carpathians, which is located in the Žilina Region of northern central Slovakia. The range is part of the Central Beskids, which are themselves part of the Outer Western Carpathians.

The Orava Magura is a sandstone massif, densely forested, with primarily spruce and beech, with cultivated birch and hazel. It's divided into three subunits, the central part, known as the Kubinska Hol'a range, the northern part, known as the Parac range, and the eastern part, known as the Budin range. The highest peak of the range is Minčol, 1394 meters, along with Paráč (1325 meters), Budín (1222 meters), and some others.

The most important tourist resorts include Tvrdošín, Zázrivá, and Dolný Kubín which are often visited during Slovakia's summer. The region is also home to the Horná Orava Protected Landscape Area.
