= Maków Beskids =

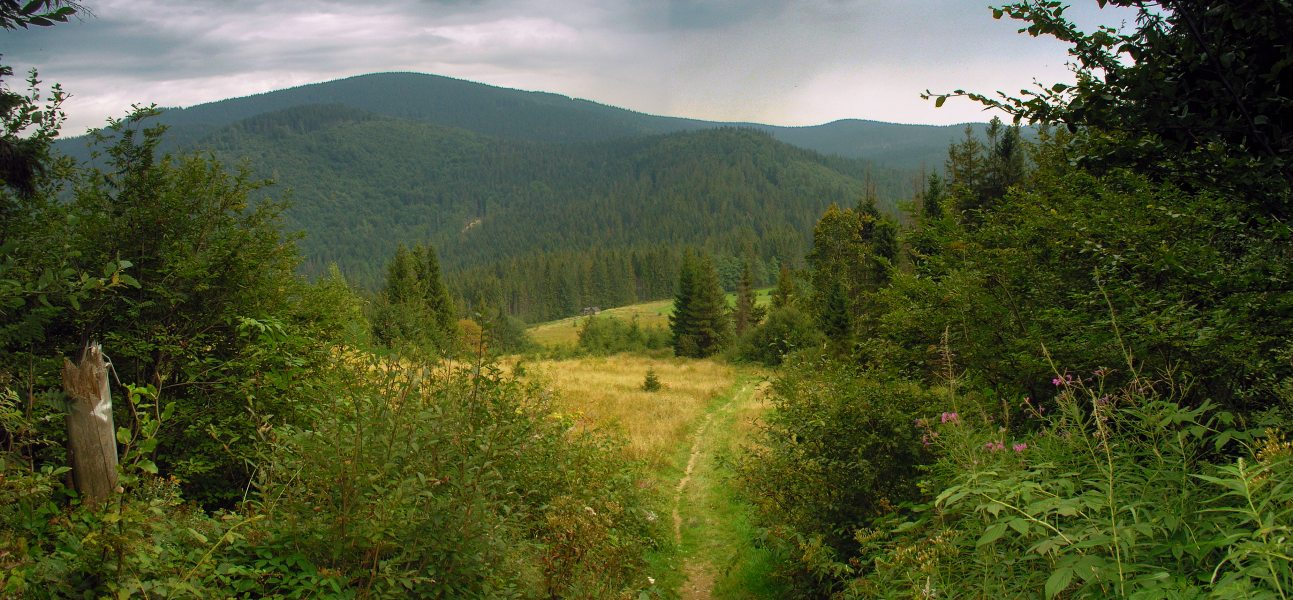
Maków Beskids

The Maków Beskids (Polish: Beskid Makowski) is a mountain range in south-central Poland, part of the Western Beskids within the Outer Western Carpathians.

Its highest peak is Mędralowa (1169 meters), within a total area of 900 square kilometers, about 60 km length and width of 15 km.

The ranges are forested, with valleys leveled for agriculture and settlements. Among the cities in the Maków Beskids are Maków Podhalański, Sucha Beskidzka, Jordanów, and Myślenice.

It's also called Medium Beskids (Polish: Beskid Średni).
