= Little Beskids =

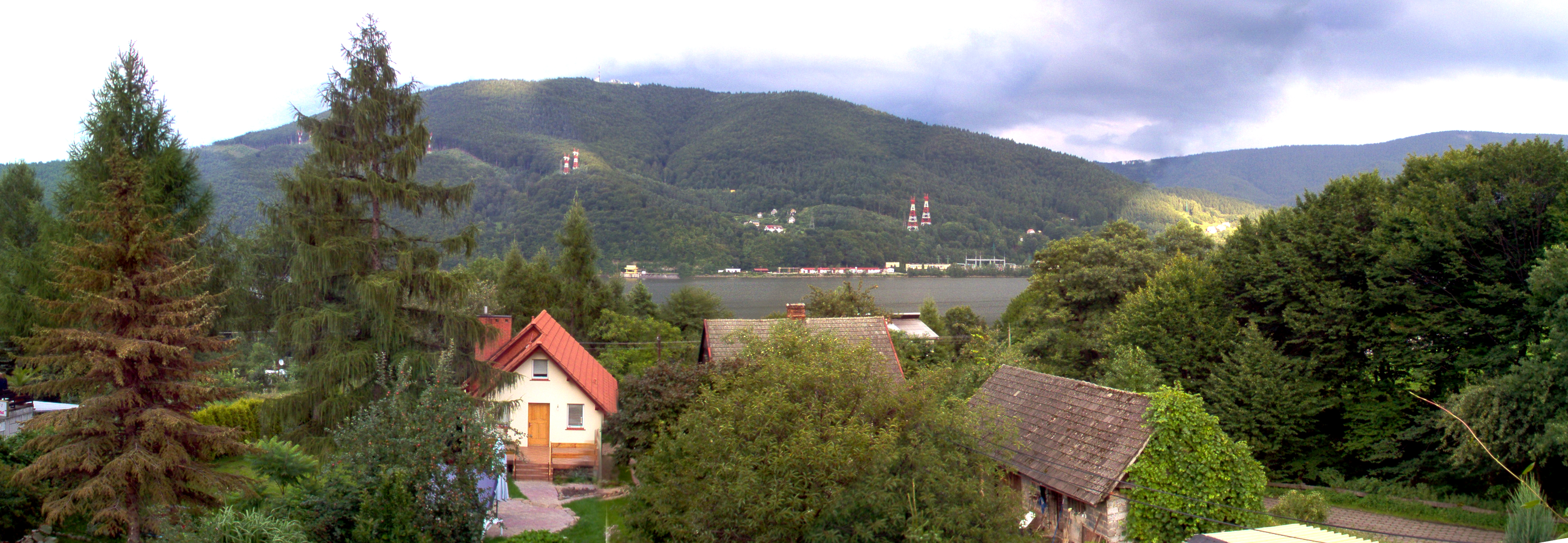
Little Beskids

The Little Beskids (Polish: Beskid Mały; Silesian: Małe Beskidy) is one of the Beskids mountain ranges in the Western Beskids ranges of the Outer Western Carpathians in southeastern Poland. Within the range is the protected area known as Little Beskids Landscape Park.

Its highest mountain is Czupel, 933 m above sea level. Soła river running from south to north divides the mountain range into two groups.

Andrychów, Bielsko-Biała, Kęty, Kozy, Międzybrodzie Bialskie, Porąbka, Wilkowice are the main starting points of the blazed routes into the mountains.
