= Żywiec Beskids =

Mountain range in the Outer Western Carpathians, Poland

Coordinates: 49°31′38″N 19°19′06″E

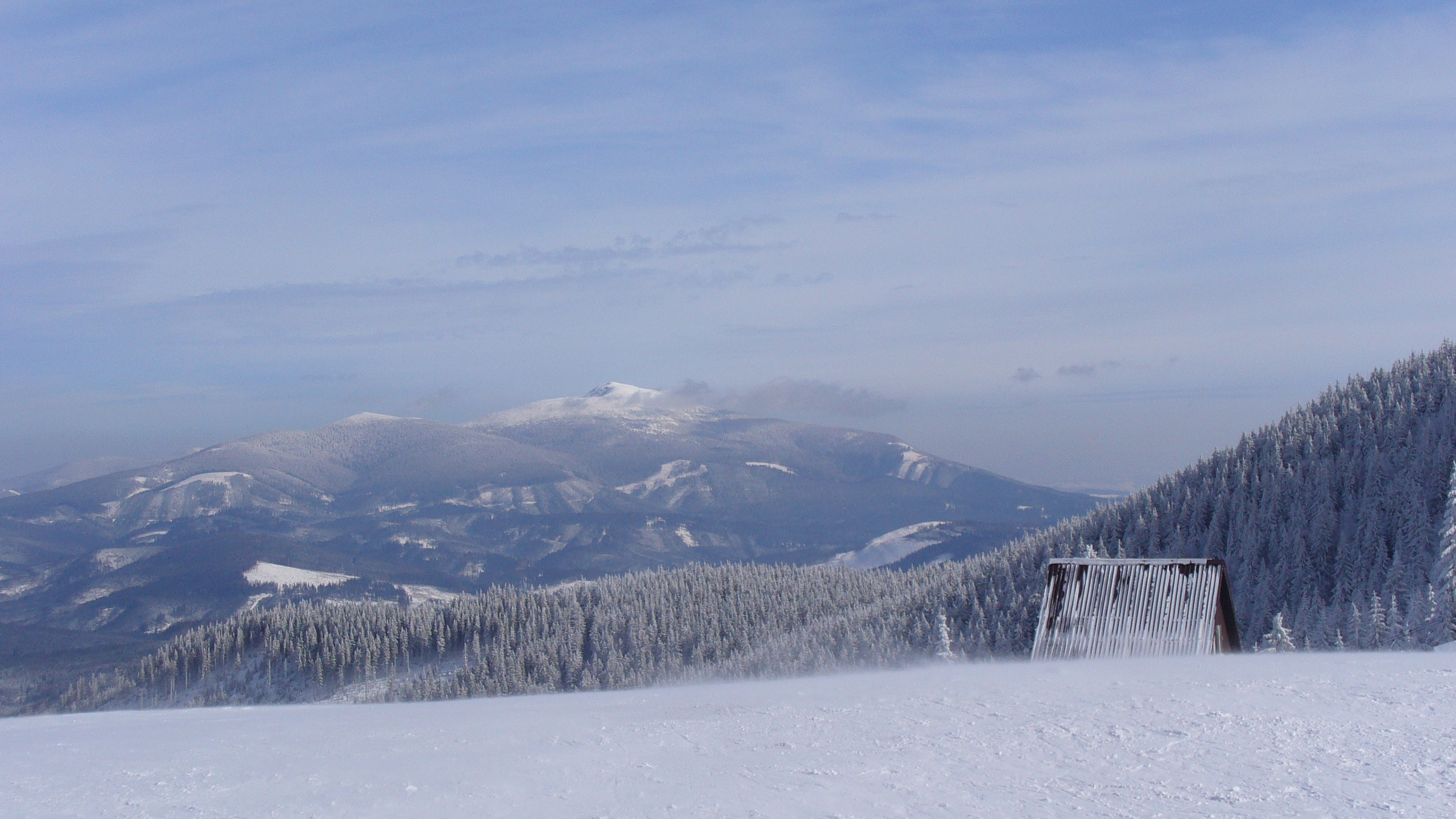
Babia Góra seen from Hala Miziowa

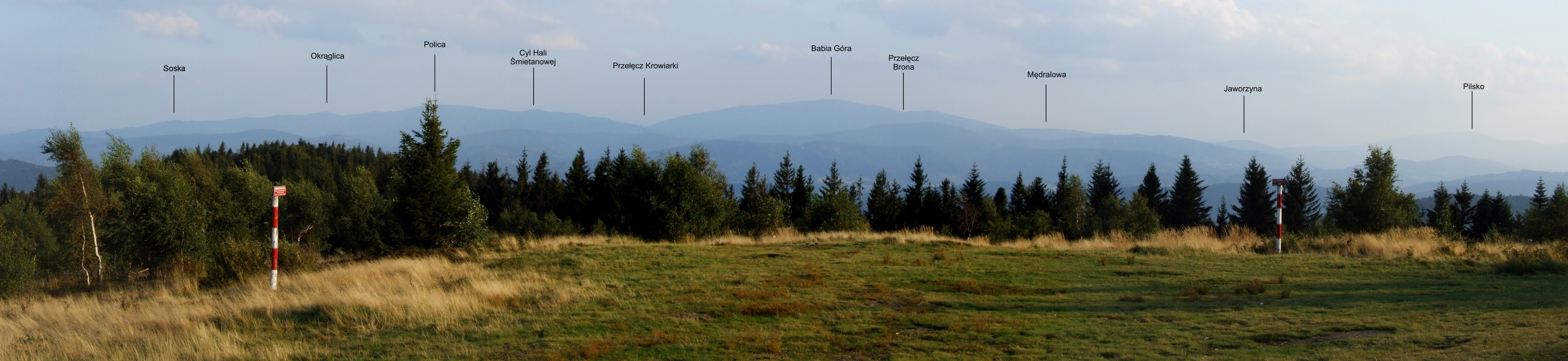
Panorama to Żywiec Beskids from Leskowiec (Little Beskids)

The Żywiec Beskids (Polish: Beskid Żywiecki) is a mountain range in the Outer Western Carpathians in southern Poland and northern Slovakia. It is the second highest range in Poland, after the Tatra Mountains. The name refers to the town Żywiec, on the Polish side of the mountains. The highest peaks are Babia Góra (1,724 m) and Pilsko (1,556 m).
