= Čergov =

Mountain range in Slovakia

Coordinates: 49°11′N 21°10′E

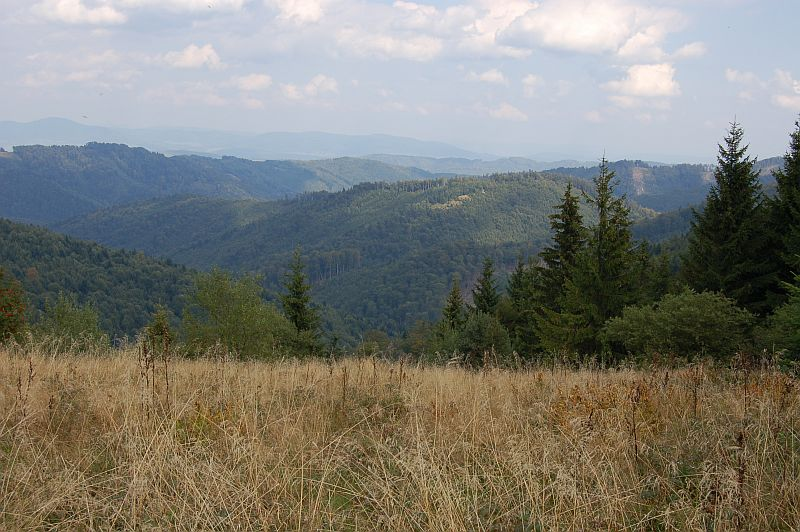
mountains of Čergov

map of the range, marked in red, among other Carpathian areas

Čergov is a mountain range in the central part of the Prešov Region of Slovakia. Geologically the range is part of the Outer Western Carpathians.

The Polish name for the range is Góry Czerchowskie, the Czerchów Mountains. In Polish terminology, it is classified within the eastern section of the Western Beskids. In Slovak terminology, the same region is known simply as the Eastern Beskids (Slovak: Východné Beskydy).

The entire range is composed of Carpathian flysch and is oriented from north to southeast. The major peaks include Minčol (1157 m), Veľká Javorina (1098 m), Bukový vrch (1010 m), and Lysá (1068 m). Čergov Peak itself stands at 1050 m.

The Topľa River and many of its tributaries, creeks and rivers arise from its eastern slopes. The slopes are grown with mixed forests with a predominance of deciduous trees, mostly beech, maple, oak, and birch.

At least five major nature reserves have been set aside for rare and protected species of trees, original vegetation, and protected animals. One of these, Národná prírodná rezervácia Čergovský Minčol (National Wildlife Reserve of Minčol in the Čergov), is centered on the highest peak and was founded in 1986.

== See also ==
- Outer Western Carpathians
- Outer Eastern Carpathians
