= Oravské Beskydy =

Mountain range in Slovakia

Coordinates: 49.5732°N 19.5296°E

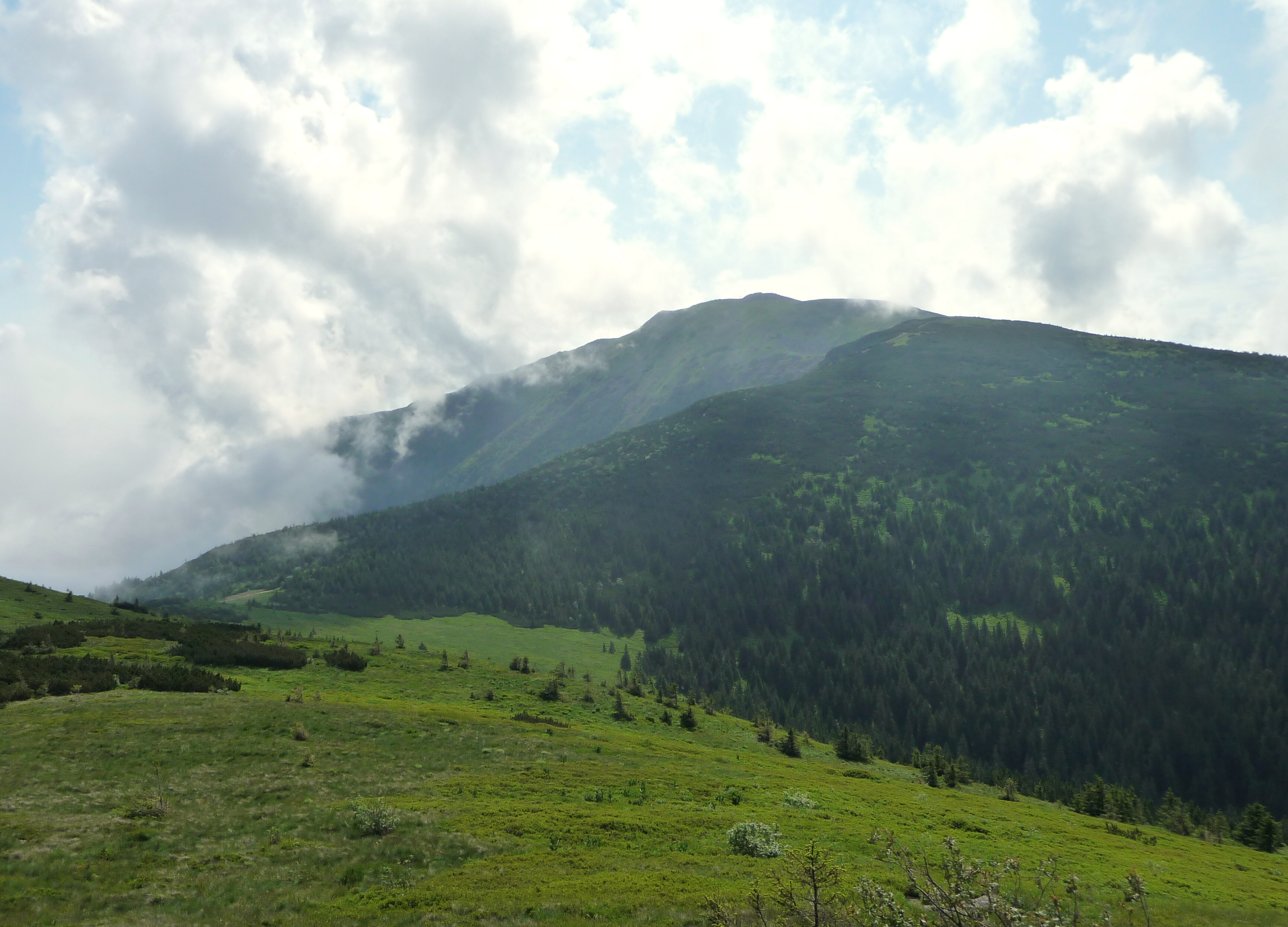
Babia Góra, a mountain in the range

Oravské Beskydy (Hungarian: Árvai-Beszkidek) is a range of mountains straddling the northern-Slovakia-southern-Poland border, considered part of the Central Beskids, within the Outer Western Carpathians.

The highest mountain of the range is Babia Góra (1,725 metres [5,659 ft]), the center of the Babia Góra National Park, one of the first biosphere reserves established worldwide.
