= Geomorphological division of Slovakia =

This article gives an overview of the geomorphological division of Slovakia. It is ordered in a hierarchical form, belonging to the Alps-Himalaya System and to the sub-systems of the Carpathian Mountains and of the Pannonian Basin. These subsystems are subsequently divided into provinces, sub-provinces and areas.

Terminology (first Slovak, second English translation(s); see also: (Slovak)):

- oblasť = area
- systém, sústava = system
- (sub)provincia = (sub)province
- nížina = lowland (0 - 200/300 m ASL)
- vysočina = highland (above 200/300 m ASL)
- rovina = flat (altitude difference app. 0 – 30 m)
- pahorkatina = hills, downs (altitude difference app. 30 – 100/150 m)
- vrchovina = upland, highland (altitude difference app. 100/150 – 300/310 m)
- hornatina = highland(s) (altitude difference app. 300/310 – 600/640 m)
- veľhornatina = mountains (altitude difference app. above 600/640 m)
- planina = app: plain, plateau, tableland
- plošina = app: plateau, tableland
- zníženina, depresia = depression
- panva = basin
- kotlina = basin
- úval = hollow, depression
- brána = gate
- tabuľa = plateau, tableland
- podhorie = foothills
- brázda = furrow
- vrchy = hills
- pohorie = mountain range, mountain chain

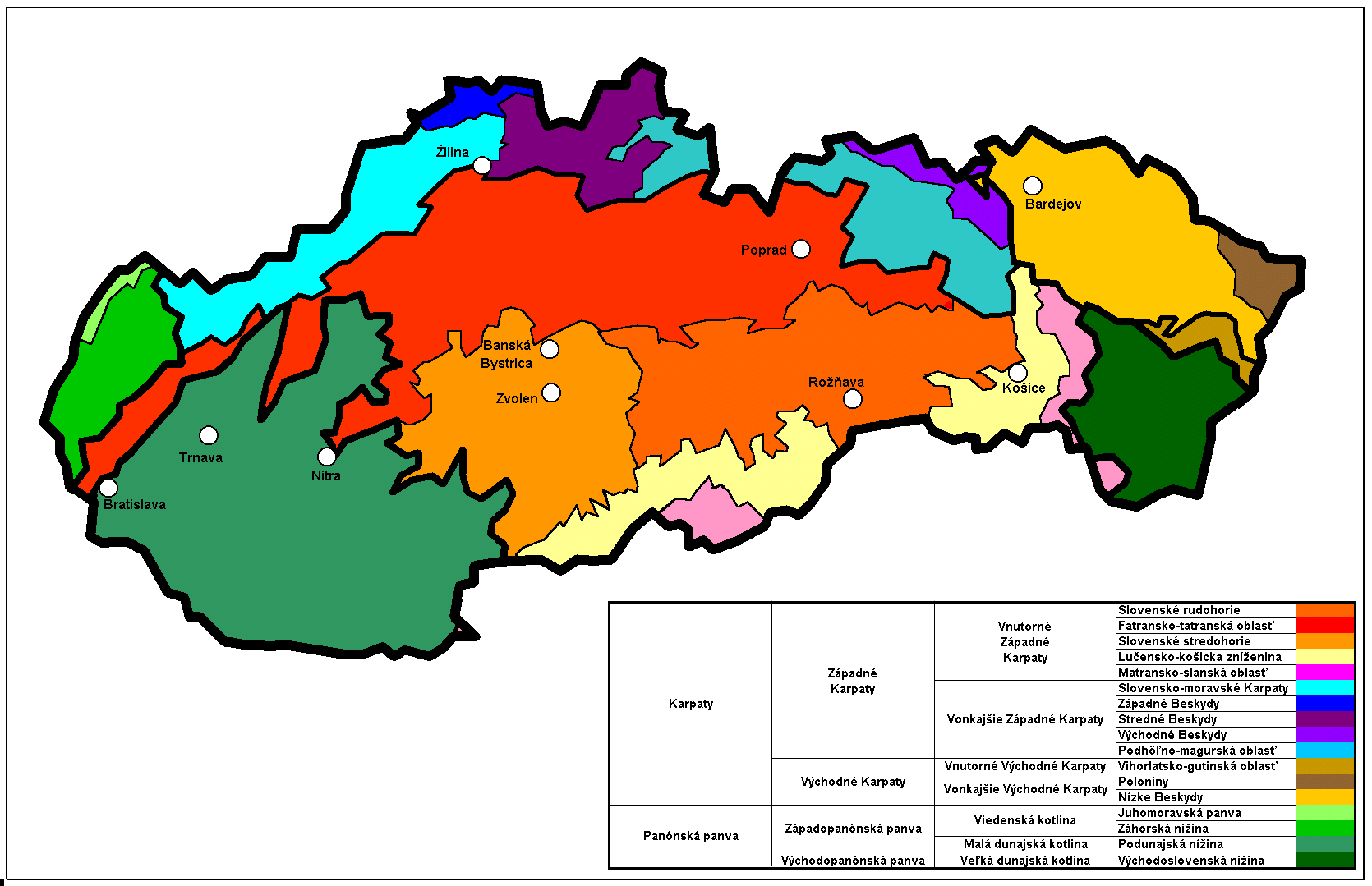
Geomorphological division of Slovakia, with Slovak names

== Carpathian Mountains (Slovak: Karpaty) (sub-system) ==
=== Western Carpathians (Západné Karpaty) (province) ===
==== Inner Western Carpathians (Vnútorné Západné Karpaty) (sub-province) ====
===== Slovak Ore Mountains (Slovenské rudohorie) (area) =====
- Vepor Mountains (Veporské vrchy)
- Spiš-Gemer Karst (Spišsko-gemerský kras)
- Stolica Mountains (Stolické vrchy)
- Revúca Highlands (Revúcka vrchovina)
- Volovec Mountains (Volovské vrchy)
- Black Mountain, Slovakia (Čierna hora)
- Rožňava Basin (Rožňavská kotlina)
- Slovak Karst (Slovenský kras) and Aggtelek Karst (Hungarian: Aggteleki-karszt; lies in northern Hungary)

===== Fatransko-tatranská oblasť (Fatra-Tatra Area) =====
- Little Carpathians (Malé Karpaty)
- Považský Inovec
- Tribeč
- Strážov Mountains (Strážovské vrchy)
- Žiar
- Malá Fatra (Lesser Fatra)
- Veľká Fatra (Greater Fatra)
- Starohorské vrchy
- Chočské vrchy
- Tatra Mountains (Tatry)
- Low Tatras (Nízke Tatry)
- Kozie chrbty
- Branisko
- Žilinská kotlina (Žilina Basin)
- Hornonitrianska kotlina (Upper Nitra Basin)
- Turčianska kotlina (Turiec Basin)
- Podtatranská kotlina
- Hornádska kotlina (Hornád Basin)
- Horehronské podolie

===== Slovenské stredohorie (Slovak Medium Mountains) (area) =====
- Vtáčnik
- Pohronský Inovec
- Štiavnické vrchy (Štiavnica Mountains)
- Kremnické vrchy (Kremnica Mountains)
- Poľana
- Ostrôžky
- Javorie
- Krupinská planina (Krupina Plain)
- Zvolenská kotlina (Zvolen Basin)
- Pliešovská kotlina
- Žiarska kotlina (Žiar Basin)

===== Lučensko-košická zníženina (Lučenec-Košice Depression) (area) =====
- Bodvianska pahorkatina
- Juhoslovenská kotlina (Southern Slovak Basin)
- Košická kotlina (Košice Basin)

===== Matransko-slanská oblasť (Matra-Slanec Area) =====
- Burda
- Cerová vrchovina
- Slanské vrchy
- Zemplínske vrchy

==== Outer Western Carpathians (Vonkajšie Západné Karpaty) (sub-province) ====
===== Slovak-Moravian Carpathians (Slovensko-moravské Karpaty) (area) =====
- White Carpathians (Biele Karpaty)
- Javorníky
- Myjavská pahorkatina (Myjava Hills)
- Považské podolie

===== Západné Beskydy (Western Beskids) (area) =====
- Moravsko-sliezske Beskydy (Moravian-Silesian Beskids)
- Turzovská vrchovina
- Jablunkovské medzihorie

===== Stredné Beskydy (Central Beskids) (area) =====
- Kysucké Beskydy
- Oravské Beskydy
- Kysucká vrchovina
- Podbeskydská brázda
- Podbeskydská vrchovina
- Oravská Magura
- Oravská vrchovina (Orava Highlands)

===== Východné Beskydy ("Eastern Beskids") (area) =====
- Pieniny
- Ľubovnianska vrchovina
- Čergov

===== Podhôľno-magurská oblasť (Podhale-Magura Area) =====
- Skorušinské vrchy
- Podtatranská brázda
- Spišská Magura
- Levočské vrchy
- Bachureň
- Spišsko-šarišské medzihorie
- Šarišská vrchovina (Šariš Highlands)
- Oravská kotlina (Orava Basin)

=== Eastern Carpathians (Východné Karpaty) (province) ===
==== Inner Eastern Carpathians (Vnútorné Východné Karpaty) (sub-province) ====
===== Vihorlatsko-gutínska oblasť (Vihorlat-Gutín Area) =====
- Vihorlat Mountains (Vihorlatské vrchy)

==== Outer Eastern Carpathians (Vonkajšie Východné Karpaty) (sub-province) ====
===== Poloniny Mountains (area) =====
- Bukovské vrchy (Bukovec Mountains)

===== Nízke Beskydy (Low Beskids) (area) =====
- Busov
- Ondavská vrchovina (Ondava Highlands)
- Laborecká vrchovina (Laborec Highlands)
- Beskydské predhorie (Beskidian Piedmont)

== Pannonian Basin (Panónska panva) (sub-system) ==
=== Západopanónska panva (West Pannonian Basin)(province) ===
==== Vienna Basin (Viedenská kotlina) (sub-province) ====
===== Záhorská nížina (Záhorie Lowland) (area) =====
- Borská nížina
- Chvojnická pahorkatina

===== Juhomoravská panva (South Moravian Basin) (area) =====
- Dolnomoravský úval

==== Malá dunajská kotlina (Little Hungarian Plain) (sub-province) ====
===== Podunajská nížina (Danubian Lowland) (area) =====
- Podunajská pahorkatina (Danubian Hills)
- Podunajská rovina (Danubian Flat)

=== Východopanónska panva (Eastern Pannonian Basin) (province) ===
==== Veľká dunajská kotlina (Great Hungarian Plain) (sub-province) ====
===== Východoslovenská nížina (Eastern Slovak Lowland) (area) =====
- Východoslovenská pahorkatina (Eastern Slovak Hills)
- Východoslovenská rovina (Eastern Slovak Flat)

== Literature ==
- Mazúr E., Lukniš M., Balatka B., Loučková J., Sládek J. (1986). Geomorfologické členenie SSR a ČSSR. Mapa mierky 1:500 000, Slovenská kartografia, SUGK, Bratislava.
