= Podtatranská kotlina =

Coordinates: 49.083°N 20.000°E

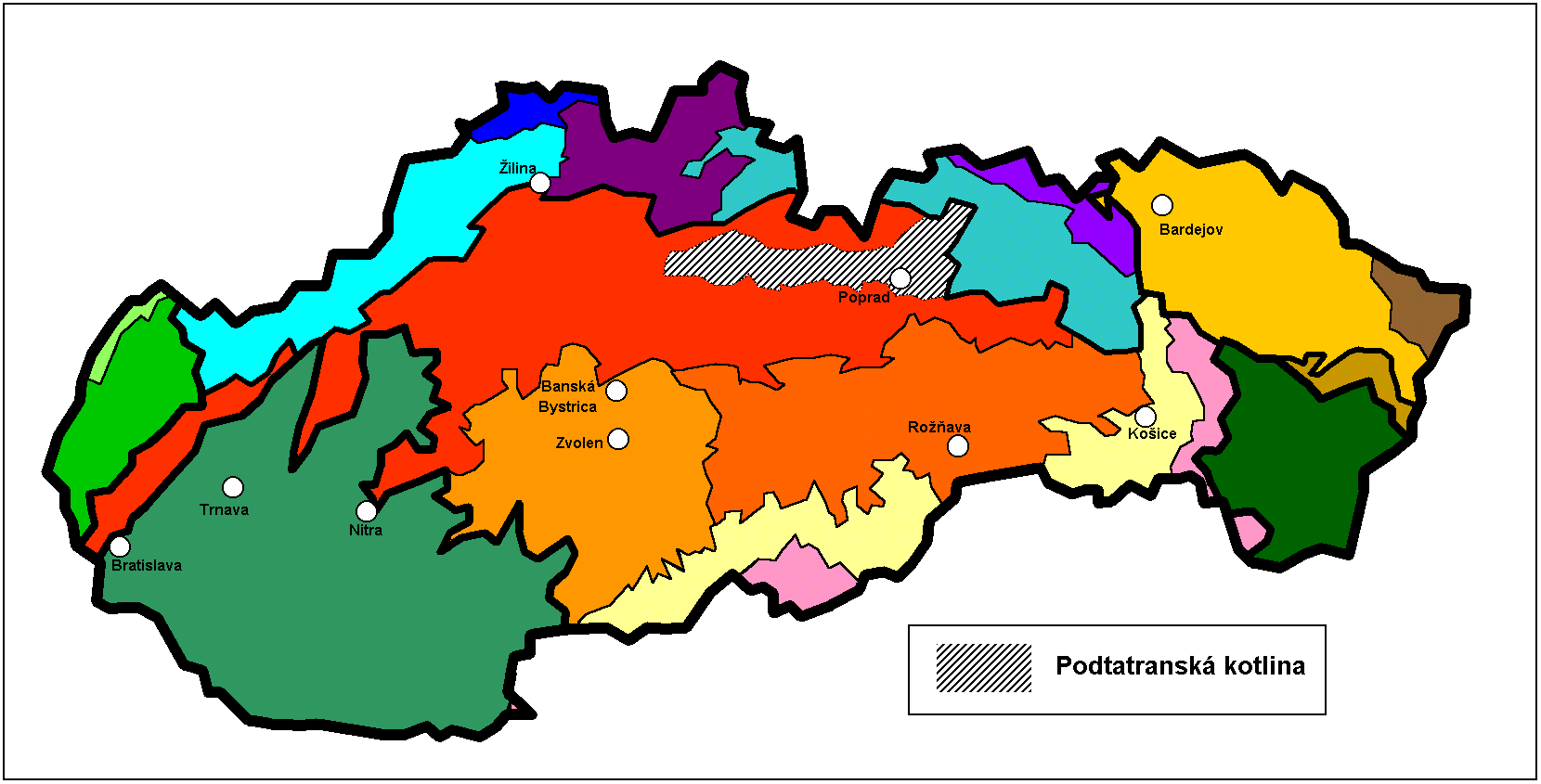
Podtatranská kotlina within the Geomorphological division of Slovakia

The Podtatranská kotlina (literally Sub-Tatra Basin or Basin under Tatra(s)) is a basin in northern Slovakia, part of the Fatra-Tatra Area, which belongs to the Inner Western Carpathians.

Towns and cities include Ružomberok, Liptovský Mikuláš, Liptovský Hrádok, Svit, Poprad, Kežmarok, Spišská Belá and Podolínec.

== Location and characteristics ==
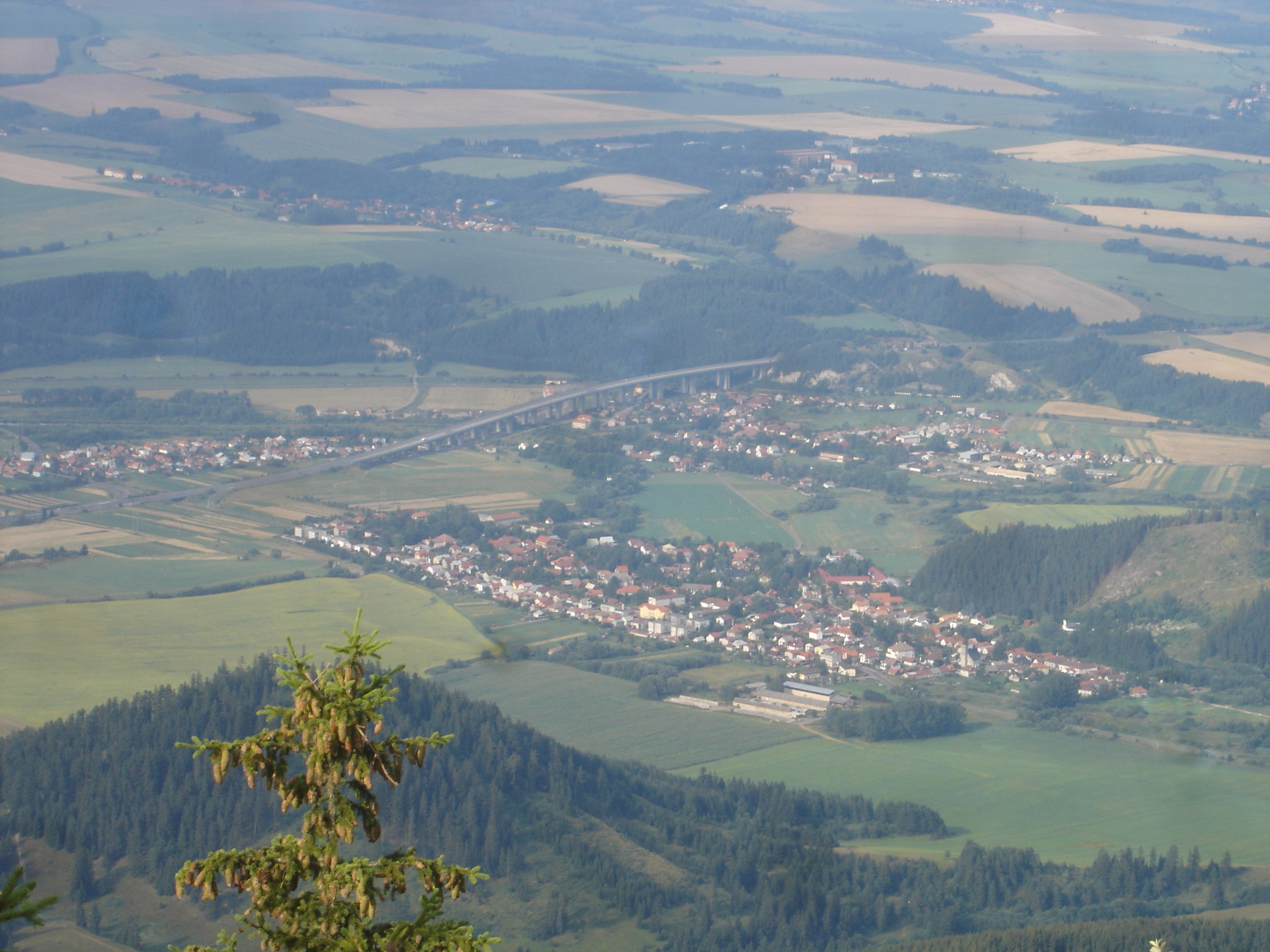
Podtatranská kotlina viewed from the Low Tatras. Villages on the picture are Liptovský Ján (centre), Uhorská Ves (left) and Podtureň (right).

The Podtatranská kotlina is oriented on an east–west axis and is around 80 km (50 mi) long and around 10 km (6.2 mi) wide in the north–south direction. It borders:

- Tatras in the north
- Spišská Magura in the north-east
- Levoča Hills in the east
- Kozie chrbty in the south-east
- Low Tatras in the south
- Greater Fatra in the south-west
- Choč Mountains in the north-west

The basin is divided into three sub-divisions: Liptovská kotlina (Liptov Basin), Popradská kotlina (Poprad Basin) and Tatranské predhorie, also called podhorie (Tatra Piedmont).

The border between the former named basins is also the drainage divide; the Váh River drains western part of the area and flows into Danube, which flows into the Black Sea, and the Poprad River drains the eastern part and flows through Dunajec into Vistula, which flows into the Baltic Sea.

The average altitude of the basin is from 700 to 800 m AMSL; the lowest point is near Ružomberok at 475 m and the highest near Štrba at around 900 m.

Originally a forested land, the basin has been transferred for agricultural use, with more varied relief being turned into meadows and pastures.

== See also ==
- Geography of Slovakia
