= Eastern Slovak Hills =

Coordinates: 48.83°N 21.78°E

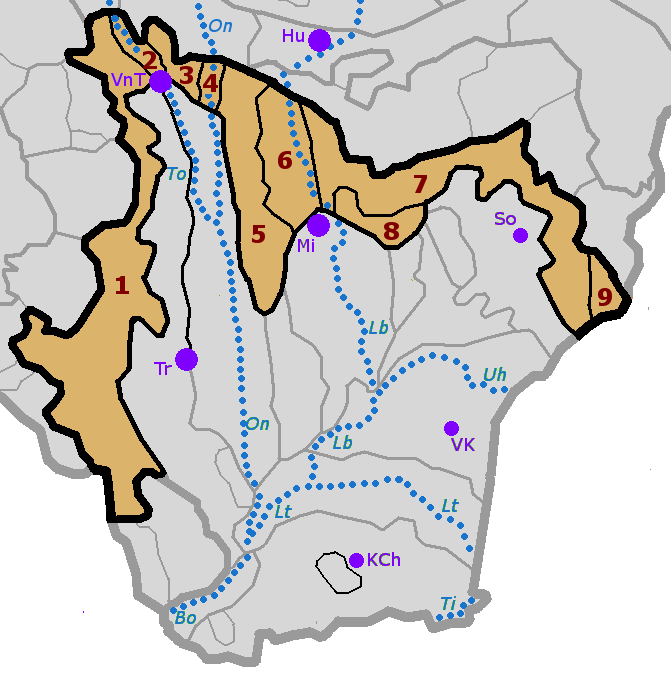
Eastern Slovak Hills (numbers in the map correspond to subdivisions listed in the article)

The East(ern) Slovak Hills (Slovak: Východoslovenská pahorkatina), also translated as Eastern Slovak Upland, is the higher, mountain-like part of the Eastern Slovak Lowland.

It is a strip of hilly land surrounding the Eastern Slovak Flat along the neighbouring volcanic mountains of the Carpathians. It covers an area of 735 km², and the highest point is Dúbravka at 397 m.

Important towns: Michaľany, Dargov, Vranov nad Topľou, Strážske, Michalovce.

Division:

1. Podslanská pahorkatina (Sub-Slanec Hills)
2. Toplianska niva (Topľa River Plain)
3. Vranovská pahorkatina (Vranov Hills)
4. Ondavská niva (Ondava River Plain)
5. Pozdišovský chrbát (Pozdišovce Ridge)
6. Laborecká niva (Laborec River Plain)
7. Podvihorlatská pahorkatina (Sub-Vihorlat Hills)
8. Zálužická pahorkatina (Zálužica Hills)
9. Petrovské podhorie (Petrovce Piedmont)

An important recreation area is the Zemplínska šírava Dam. Alkaline salty springs can be found at the Byšta health resort. Other springs are at Kuzmice, Veľaty and Kazimír.

The areas is used for agriculture (grain growing, thermophile vegetables, fruits and - near Sobrance – for vineyards).
