= Branisko =

Branisko may be:

- Branisko (mountain range), a mountain range in eastern Slovakia between Spiš and Šariš regions.
- Branisko (hill), a mountain pass and hill.
- Branisko Tunnel, a motorway tunnel opened in 2003
- 11.5 km long creek in the Spiš region
