= Branisko Tunnel =

Road tunnel in Slovakia

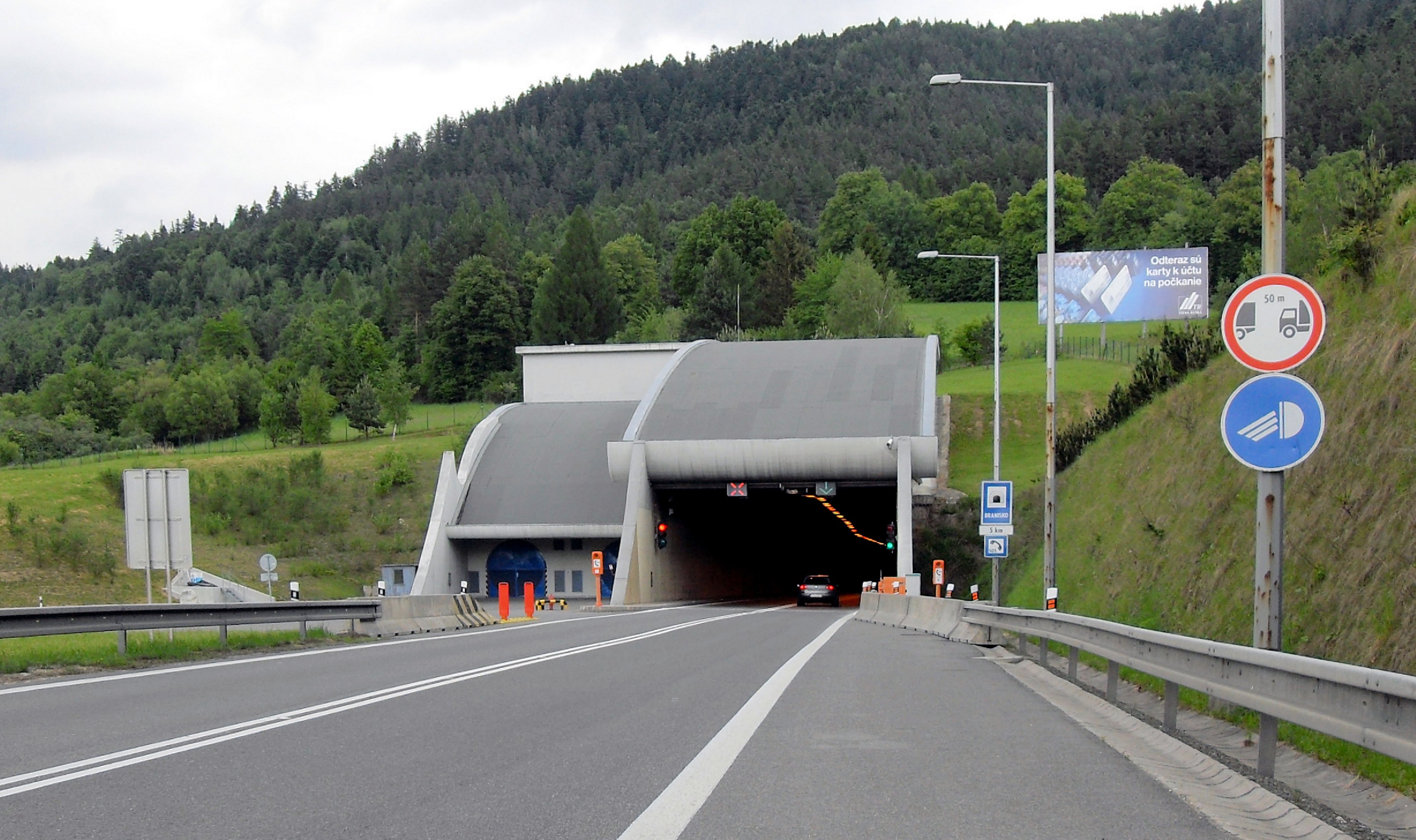
- Western portal of the Branisko tunnel
- Interactive map of Branisko Tunnel

Overview
- Coordinates: 49°00′19.61″N 20°52′31.43″E
- Status: Open in a half profile
- Route: D1 motorway

Operation
- Work began: 1996
- Opened: June 29, 2003
- Owner: National Motorway Company
- Traffic: Automobile
- Toll: None - included with the vignette
- Vehicles per day: 17,500 (May 2025)

Technical
- Length: 4,975 m (16,322 ft)
- No. of lanes: 2 (1 in each direction)
- Operating speed: 80 km/h (50 mph)
- Tunnel clearance: 4.5 m (15 ft)
- Width: 7.5 m (25 ft)
- Grade: 1.2%

The Branisko Tunnel is a road tunnel in eastern Slovakia. It is located on the D1 motorway at the Beharovce - Fričovce section. It replaced the Branisko Pass road via mountain range of the same name, with the top at 751 m AMSL. Currently only one tube is open to traffic; the second tube is expected to be opened in the future.

Construction began when the exploration gallery driving was launched in April 1996 on the axle of the northern (left) tube. The southern tube driving started in May 1997 from both portals using New Austrian Tunnelling method (NATM). Works were slowed in 1999 due to cost cutting for motorway constructions. The breakthrough was made on May 1, 1999. The southern (right) tube of the tunnel with the Beharovce - Fričovce section was opened on June 29, 2003.

The tunnel is 4975 m long. The road in the tunnel is 7.5 m wide, with 1 m wide sidewalks on both sides; maximum height is 4.5 m, maximum gradient is 1.2%. The maximum allowed speed in tunnel is 80 km/h.
