= Kráľovce =

Kráľovce Királynépe
- Municipality
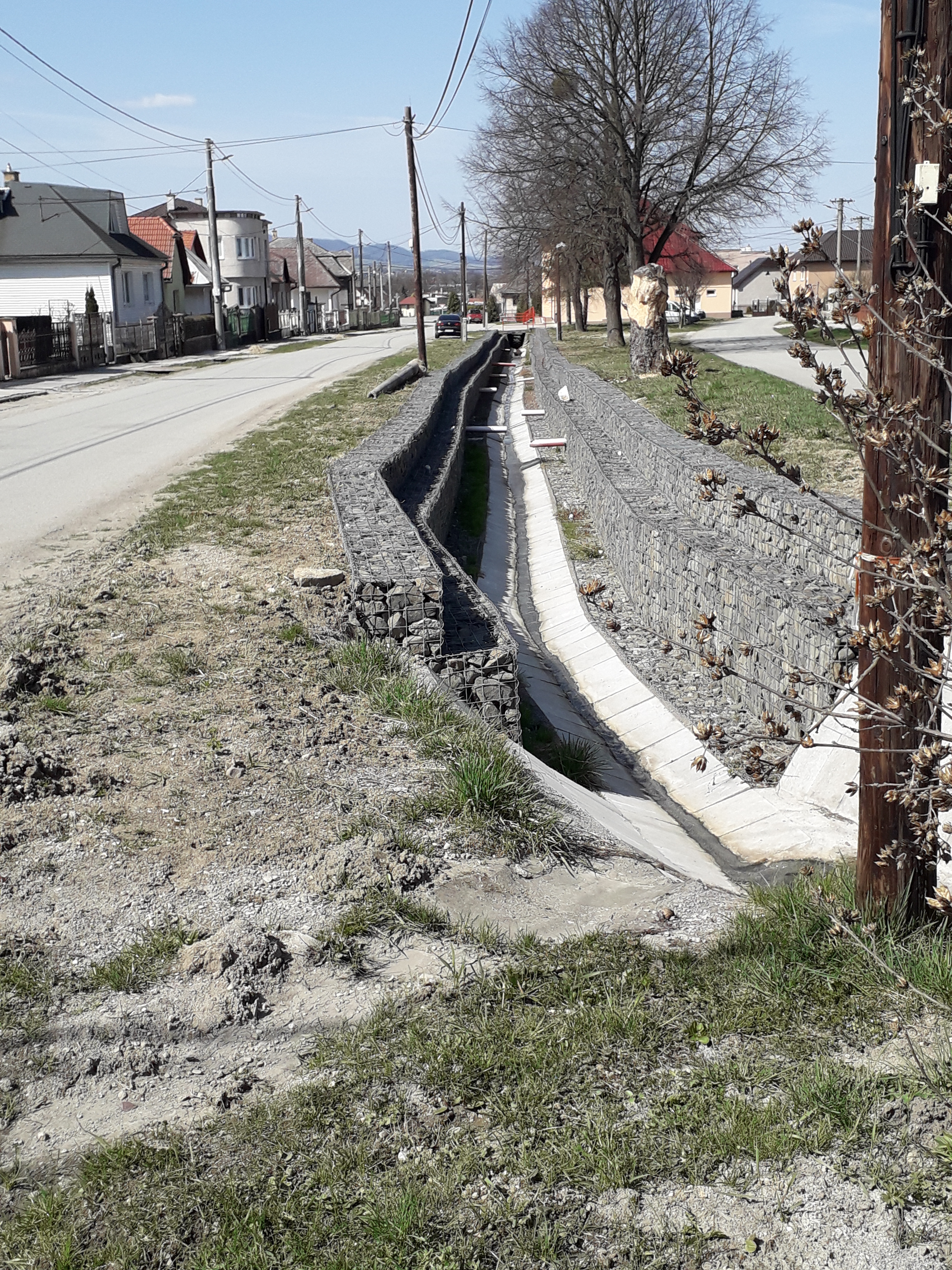

- Flag

- Location of Kráľovce in the Košice Region Location of Kráľovce in Slovakia
- Coordinates: 48.80°N 21.33°E
- Country: Slovakia
- Region: Košice Region
- District: Košice-okolie District
- First mentioned: 1388

Area
  - Total: 6.53 km^{2} (2.52 sq mi)
- Elevation: 209 m (686 ft)

Population (2025)
  - Total: 1,167
- Time zone: UTC+1 (CET)
  - Summer (DST): UTC+2 (CEST)
- Postal code: 444 4
- Area code: +421 55
- Vehicle registration plate (until 2022): KS
- Website: kralovce.sk

Kráľovce (Slovak pronunciation: [ˈkraːʎɔwtse]; Hungarian: Királynépe) is a village and municipality in Košice-okolie District in the Kosice Region of eastern Slovakia. Nearby flows the Torysa River.

== History ==
In historical records the village was first mentioned in 1388.

Historical names:

- 1388 – Kyslapuspatak
- 1427 – Kys-Lapispatak
- 1488 – Király népi
- 1630 – Király népe
- 1773 – Kraloweze
- 1920 – Kráľovce

== Geography ==
The municipality lies at an altitude of 209 metres (686 ft) and covers an area of 6.53 km^{2} (2.52 sq mi) (2025).

== Population ==
Population statistic (10 years)
Year	1995	2005	2015	2025
Count	961	1097	1122	1167
Difference		+14.15%	+2.27%	+4.01%

Population statistic
Year	2024	2025
Count	1154	1167
Difference		+1.12%

It has a population of 1167 people (31 December 2025).

=== Ethnicity ===
Census 2021 (1+ %)
Ethnicity	Number	Fraction
Slovak	1064	92.6%
Romani	86	7.48%
Not found out	59	5.13%
Total	1149	

In year 2021 was 1149 people by ethnicity 1064 as Slovak, 86 as Romani, 59 as Not found out, 7 as Hungarian, 3 as Czech, 3 as Rusyn, 2 as Ukrainian and 1 as Other.

Note on population: The difference values of population numbers in the table "Population statistic" and in the sections "Ethnicity" & "Religion" is caused by the use of various statistical methods.

=== Religion ===
Census 2021 (1+ %)
Religion	Number	Fraction
Roman Catholic Church	463	40.3%
Greek Catholic Church	322	28.02%
None	180	15.67%
Evangelical Church	74	6.44%
Not found out	54	4.7%
Christian Congregations in Slovakia	16	1.39%
Total	1149	

In year 2021 was 1149 people by religion 463 from Roman Catholic Church, 322 from Greek Catholic Church, 180 from None, 74 from Evangelical Church, 54 from Not found out, 16 from Christian Congregations in Slovakia, 10 from Jehovah's Witnesses, 8 from Calvinist Church, 8 from Apostolic Church, 4 from Eastern Orthodox Church, 3 from Baptists Church, 1 from Jewish community, 1 from Other and not ascertained christian church, 1 from New Apostolic Church, 1 from Islam, 1 from United Methodist Church, 1 from Church of the Brethren and 1 from Ad hoc movements.
