= Magyarfalu =

Magyarfalu (meaning "Hungarian village") may refer to:

- Hungarian name of Záhorská Ves, a village in Slovakia
- Hungarian name of Uhorská Ves, a village in Slovakia
- Hungarian name of Arini, a Csángó Hungarian village in Găiceana Commune, Bacău County, Romania
