= Šambron =

- Municipality
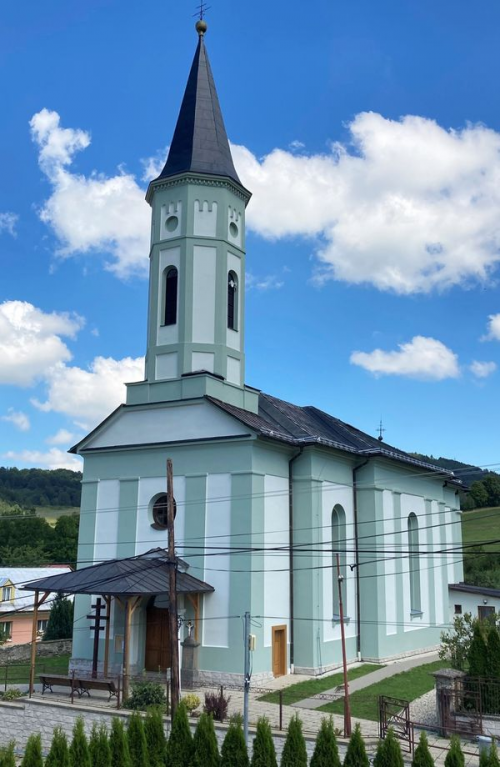

- Flag

- Location of Šambron in the Prešov Region Location of Šambron in Slovakia
- Coordinates: 49.22°N 20.75°E
- Country: Slovakia
- Region: Prešov Region
- District: Stará Ľubovňa District
- First mentioned: 1411

Area
  - Total: 12.91 km^{2} (4.98 sq mi)
- Elevation: 671 m (2,201 ft)

Population (2025)
  - Total: 361
- Time zone: UTC+1 (CET)
  - Summer (DST): UTC+2 (CEST)
- Postal code: 654 7
- Area code: +421 52
- Vehicle registration plate (until 2022): SL
- Website: www.sambron.sk

Šambron (Rusyn: Шамброн, romanized: Shambron; Hungarian: Feketekút) is a village and municipality in Stará Ľubovňa District in the Prešov Region of northern Slovakia.

== Culture and points of interest ==
=== Culture ===
MSS Šambriňci (Men’s Singing Group Šambriňci) was established as a civic association based in Šambron. The group is dedicated to preserving and performing traditional Ruthenian folklore and spiritual songs. Its members are primarily local residents.

=== Landmarks ===
The Greek Catholic Church of the Protection of the Most Holy Mother of God is a single-nave Neo-Romanesque building with a polygonal presbytery and an integrated tower, built in 1872. It was modified in 1934 and after being damaged during World War II. The interior features barrel and Prussian vaults. The church furnishings, including the iconostasis, are of a later date. A side Neo-Baroque altar dates back to the time of the church’s construction. Among its historical inventory is a chalice from 1636, now part of the collection of the Šariš Museum in Bardejov. The facades are articulated with pilasters and semicircular windows. The octagonal tower is decorated with lesenes and a string cornice, topped with an arcaded frieze and a pyramidal spire.

=== Points of interest ===
- The village was one of the filming locations for the Slovak movie Muž nie je žiadúci (The Man is Not Wanted), which premiered in 1983.
- The historical name of Šambron, Schönbrunn (German for "beautiful spring"), is identical to the name of the famous Schönbrunn Palace in Vienna. Both names likely derive from the presence of a significant water spring and share a common linguistic origin from the Austro-Hungarian period.

=== Moon Cave ===
The Moon Cave, also known as the Moon Shaft, is one of the greatest speleological mysteries in Slovakia. According to legend, it was discovered during the Slovak National Uprising in 1944 by partisan and naturalist Antonín T. Horák, who recorded his experience in a personal diary.

According to his notes, the cave was located in the Levoča Mountains, near the village of Šambron. The entrance was said to be hidden behind boulders and led into a narrow passage that, after about 1.5 hours of walking, opened into a mysterious crescent-shaped shaft. The walls of this shaft were reportedly made of an unknown dark blue metallic material and adorned with stalactites, sparking speculation about a possible extraterrestrial origin.

Since Horák’s article was published in the American journal National Speleological Society News in 1963, the cave has attracted the interest of speleologists from around the world. Despite numerous expeditions and investigations, its exact location remains unconfirmed to this day.

== History ==
In historical records the village was first mentioned in 1411. Before the establishment of independent Czechoslovakia in 1918, Šambron was part of Sáros County within the Kingdom of Hungary. From 1939 to 1945, it was part of the Slovak Republic. On 23 January 1945, the Red Army dislodged the Wehrmacht from Šambron and it was once again part of Czechoslovakia.

== Geography ==
The municipality lies at an altitude of 671 metres (2,201 ft) and covers an area of 12.91 km^{2} (4.98 sq mi) (2025).

== Population ==
Population statistic (10 years)
Year	1995	2005	2015	2025
Count	472	421	390	361
Difference		−10.80%	−7.36%	−7.43%

Population statistic
Year	2024	2025
Count	358	361
Difference		+0.83%

It has a population of 361 people (31 December 2025).

=== Ethnicity ===
Census 2021 (1+ %)
Ethnicity	Number	Fraction
Slovak	314	83.51%
Rusyn	207	55.05%
Not found out	13	3.45%
Total	376	

In year 2021 was 376 people by ethnicity 314 as Slovak, 207 as Rusyn, 13 as Not found out, 2 as Czech, 2 as Ukrainian and 2 as Other.

Note on population: The difference values of population numbers in the table "Population statistic" and in the sections "Ethnicity" & "Religion" is caused by the use of various statistical methods.

=== Religion ===
Census 2021 (1+ %)
Religion	Number	Fraction
Greek Catholic Church	316	84.04%
Roman Catholic Church	28	7.45%
None	24	6.38%
Not found out	5	1.33%
Total	376	

In year 2021 was 376 people by religion 316 from Greek Catholic Church, 28 from Roman Catholic Church, 24 from None, 5 from Not found out, 1 from Calvinist Church, 1 from Eastern Orthodox Church and 1 from Ad hoc movements.
