= Spiš–Gubałówka Highlands =

Spiš–Gubałówka Highlands Pogórze Spisko-Gubałowskie
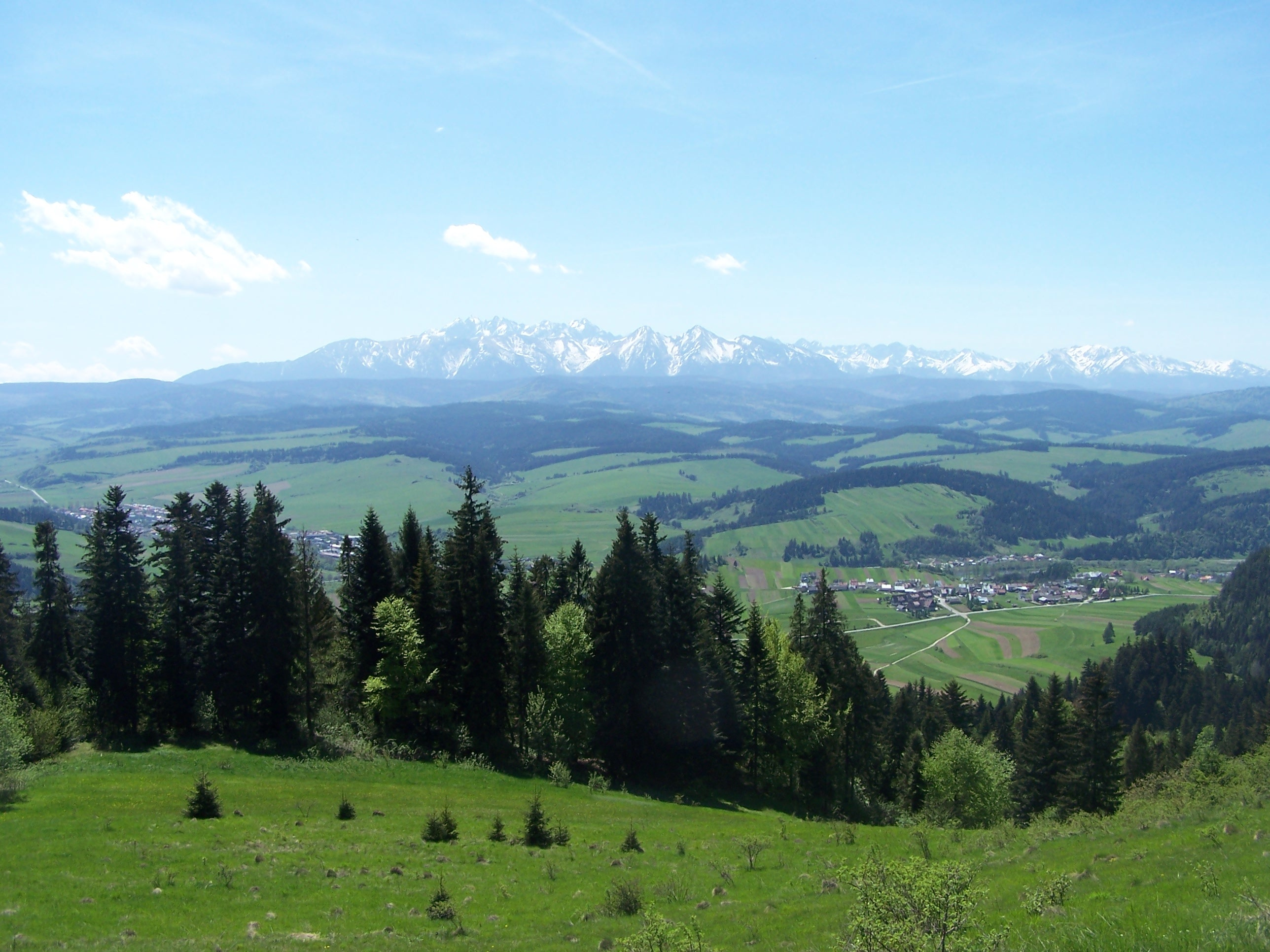
- View from the Pieniny onto the Tatra Mountains and the eastern Spisko-Gubałoski Highlands

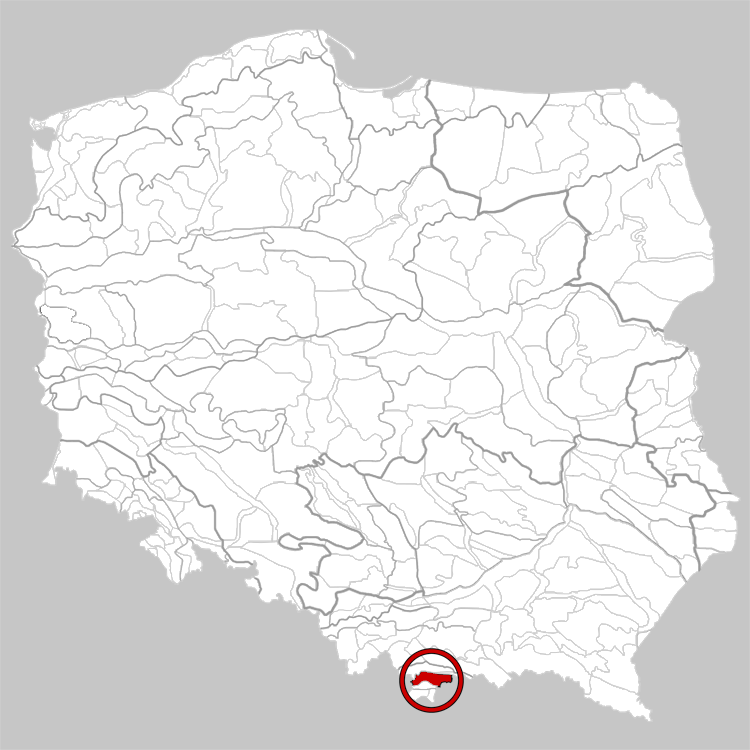
- Location of the Podtatrzański Trench in Poland
- Country: Poland

Spiš–Gubałówka Highlands (Pogórze Spisko-Gubałowskie, Polish) (514.13) - a mesoregion, the southern and highest part of the Podhale-Magura Depression, its north defined by the Pieniny Klippen Belt, the east of which carries on from the Pieniny. The southern side of the Spisko-Gubałowski Highlands is defined by the decline of the Podtatrzański Trench.

== Topography ==
Distinguishable topographical features of the Spisko-Gubałowski Highlands are as follows:

- Skoruszyńskie Highlands. Divided into three subregions:
  - Orava Highlands
  - Skoruszyńskie Summits
  - Orava-Wit Summits
- Gubałowski Highlands
- Bukowiński Highlands
- Spisz Highlands

== See also ==
- Zakopane
- Tatra Mountains
