= Podhale-Magura Area =

Mountain range in Eastern Europe

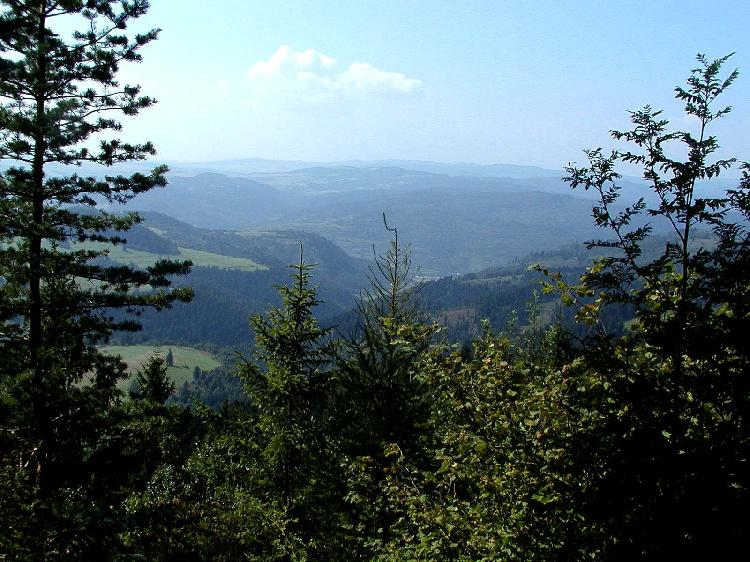
- Levoča Mountains, Slovakia

Highest point
- Peak: Skorušina
- Elevation: 1,314 m (4,311 ft)
- Coordinates: 49°17′53″N 19°41′31″E

Naming
- Native name: Podhôľno-magurská oblasť (Slovak); Obniżenie Orawsko-Podhalańskie (Polish)

Geography
- Podhale-Magura Area ranges (marked in red) within the Outer Western Carpathians
- Countries: Slovakia and Poland
- Regions: Žilina, Prešov and Lesser Poland
- Parent range: Outer Western Carpathians
- Borders on: Central Beskids, (Polish) Western Beskids, Lower Beskids and Fatra-Tatra Area

The Podhale-Magura Area (Slovak: Podhôľno-magurská oblasť; known in Polish as the Orava-Podhale Depression, Obniżenie Orawsko-Podhalańskie) — is a geomorphologic region of mountain ranges in northern Slovakia and southern Poland, belonging to the Outer Western Carpathians within the Carpathian Mountains system.

== Subdivision ==
The Podhale-Magura Area consists of:

- Skorušina Mountains (SK: Skorušinské vrchy) + Spiš-Gubałówka Highlands (PL: Pogórze Spisko-Gubałowskie)
- Sub-Tatra Trench (SK: Podtatranská brázda, PL: Rów Podtatrzański)
- Spiš Magura (SK: Spišská Magura) + Spiš-Gubałówka Highlands (PL: Pogórze Spisko-Gubałowskie)
- Levoča Mountains (SK: Levočské vrchy), with its highest point, Čierna hora (Black Mountain), 1,289 metres
- Bachureň (SK)
- Spiš-Šariš Intermontane (SK: Spišsko-šarišské medzihorie)
- Šariš Highlands (SK: Šarišská vrchovina)
- Orava Basin (SK: Oravská kotlina) + Orava-Nowy Targ Basin (PL: Kotlina Orawsko-Nowotarska)

The adjacent Pieniny range is sometimes considered part of the Podhale-Magura Area; otherwise considered as part of the Eastern section of the Western Beskids.
