= Nižná Hutka =

Municipality of Slovakia

Nižná Hutka Alsóhutka
- Municipality
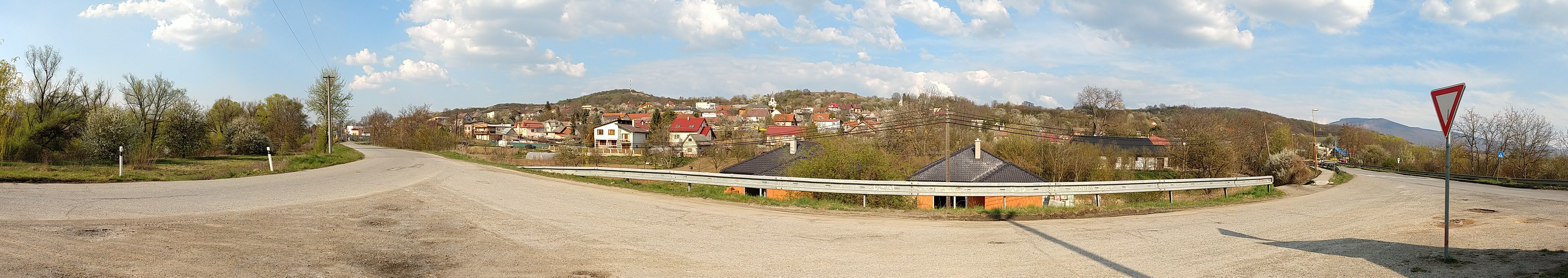

- Flag

- Location of Nižná Hutka in the Košice Region Location of Nižná Hutka in Slovakia
- Coordinates: 48.67°N 21.37°E
- Country: Slovakia
- Region: Košice Region
- District: Košice-okolie District
- First mentioned: 1293

Area
  - Total: 4.34 km^{2} (1.68 sq mi)
- Elevation: 181 m (594 ft)

Population (2025)
  - Total: 623
- Time zone: UTC+1 (CET)
  - Summer (DST): UTC+2 (CEST)
- Postal code: 401 8
- Area code: +421 55
- Vehicle registration plate (until 2022): KS
- Website: www.niznahutka.sk

Nižná Hutka (Hungarian: Alsóhutka) is a village and municipality in Košice-okolie District in the Kosice Region of eastern Slovakia. One of the two consulates of the Seychelles in Slovakia is located in Nižná Hutka.

== History ==
In historical records, the village was first mentioned in 1293.

== Geography ==
The municipality lies at an altitude of 181 metres (594 ft) and covers an area of 4.34 km^{2} (1.68 sq mi) (2025). The Torysa River flows into the Hornád River near Nižná Hutka.

== Population ==
Population statistic (10 years)
Year	1995	2005	2015	2025
Count	402	506	587	623
Difference		+25.87%	+16.00%	+6.13%

Population statistic
Year	2024	2025
Count	609	623
Difference		+2.29%

It has a population of 623 people (31 December 2025).

=== Ethnicity ===
Census 2021 (1+ %)
Ethnicity	Number	Fraction
Slovak	600	97.71%
Not found out	8	1.3%
Rusyn	7	1.14%
Hungarian	7	1.14%
Total	614	

In year 2021 was 614 people by ethnicity 600 as Slovak, 8 as Not found out, 7 as Rusyn, 7 as Hungarian, 1 as Czech, 1 as Russian, 1 as Polish, 1 as German and 1 as Other.

Note on population: The difference values of population numbers in the table "Population statistic" and in the sections "Ethnicity" & "Religion" is caused by the use of various statistical methods.

=== Religion ===
Census 2021 (1+ %)
Religion	Number	Fraction
Roman Catholic Church	329	53.58%
Calvinist Church	124	20.2%
None	108	17.59%
Greek Catholic Church	24	3.91%
Evangelical Church	9	1.47%
Total	614	

In year 2021 was 614 people by religion 329 from Roman Catholic Church, 124 from Calvinist Church, 108 from None, 24 from Greek Catholic Church, 9 from Evangelical Church, 6 from Not found out, 4 from Other, 3 from Eastern Orthodox Church, 2 from Apostolic Church, 1 from Other and not ascertained christian church, 1 from Jehovah's Witnesses, 1 from Christian Congregations in Slovakia, 1 from Seventh-day Adventist Church and 1 from Ad hoc movements.
