= Beharovce =

Village and municipality in Levoča, Prešov, Slovakia

- Municipality
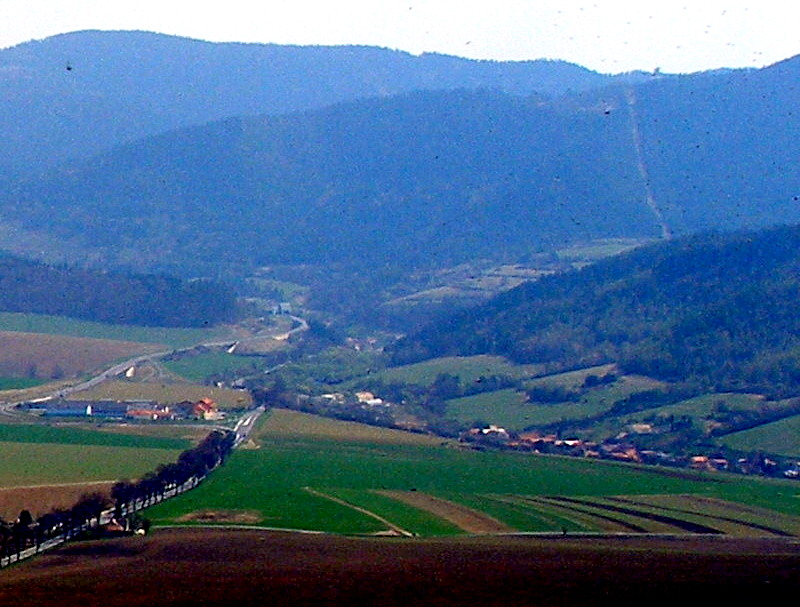

- Flag

- Location of Beharovce in the Prešov Region Location of Beharovce in Slovakia
- Coordinates: 49.00°N 20.81°E
- Country: Slovakia
- Region: Prešov Region
- District: Levoča District
- First mentioned: 1338

Area
  - Total: 2.64 km^{2} (1.02 sq mi)
- Elevation: 464 m (1,522 ft)

Population (2025)
  - Total: 183
- Time zone: UTC+1 (CET)
  - Summer (DST): UTC+2 (CEST)
- Postal code: 530 5
- Area code: +421 53
- Vehicle registration plate (until 2022): LE
- Website: www.beharovce.sk

Beharovce (Hungarian: Beharóc) is a small village and municipality in the Levoča District, Prešov Region.

== History ==
In historical records the village was first mentioned in 1338.

== Geography ==
The municipality lies at an altitude of 464 metres (1,522 ft) and covers an area of 2.64 km^{2} (1.02 sq mi) (2025). The village is few kilometres away from the Branisko tunnel.

== Population ==
Population statistic (10 years)
Year	1995	2005	2015	2025
Count	163	176	160	183
Difference		+7.97%	−9.09%	+14.37%

Population statistic
Year	2024	2025
Count	181	183
Difference		+1.10%

It has a population of 183 people (31 December 2025).

=== Ethnicity ===
Census 2021 (1+ %)
Ethnicity	Number	Fraction
Slovak	165	97.63%
Not found out	3	1.77%
Total	169	

In year 2021 was 169 people by ethnicity 165 as Slovak, 3 as Not found out and 1 as Romani.

Note on population: The difference values of population numbers in the table "Population statistic" and in the sections "Ethnicity" & "Religion" is caused by the use of various statistical methods.

=== Religion ===
Census 2021 (1+ %)
Religion	Number	Fraction
Roman Catholic Church	159	94.08%
Not found out	4	2.37%
None	4	2.37%
Total	169	

In year 2021 was 169 people by religion 159 from Roman Catholic Church, 4 from Not found out, 4 from None, 1 from Christian Congregations in Slovakia and 1 from Other.

== Genealogical resources ==
The records for genealogical research are available at the state archive "Statny Archiv in Levoca, Slovakia"

- Roman Catholic church records (births/marriages/deaths): 1760-1948 (parish B)

== See also ==
- List of municipalities and towns in Slovakia
