= Turiec Basin =

Mountain range in Slovakia

Coordinates: 49°01′48″N 18°55′12″E

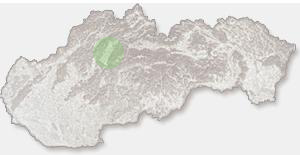
Location of Turiec Basin

The Turiec Basin (Slovak: Turčianska kotlina; Hungarian: Túróci-medence; German: Turzbecken; Latin: Pelvis Thuroczae) is located in the northern part of central Slovakia, within the Fatra-Tatra Area of the Inner Western Carpathians.

The basin is delimited by the mountain ranges of Veľká Fatra to the east, Malá Fatra to the west and north, as well as Žiar and Kremnica Mountains to the south. The Turiec River flows through the entire basin and inflows into Váh near Vrútky. The largest towns are Martin, Vrútky (both part of the Martin District) and Turčianske Teplice (part of the Turčianske Teplice District).
