= Torysa (river) =

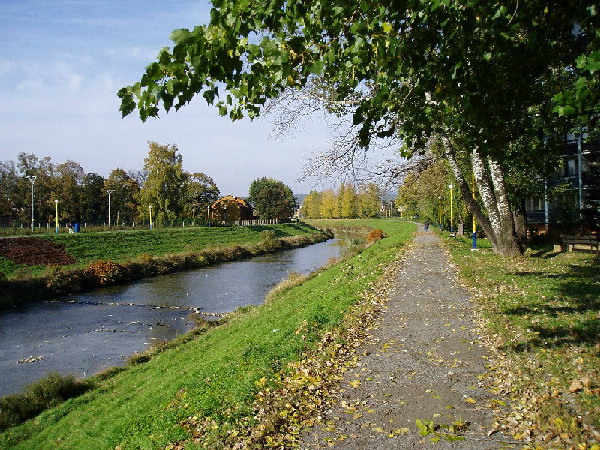
- Torysa river in Prešov

Location
- Country: Slovakia

Physical characteristics
- Source
  - location: Levoča Mountains
- Mouth
  - location: Hornád near Nižná Hutka
  - coordinates: 48.6414°N 21.3582°E
- Length: 124 km (77 mi)
- Basin size: 1,349 km^{2} (521 sq mi)
- Discharge
  - average: 8.2 m^{3}/s (290 cu ft/s)

Basin features
- Progression: Hornád→ Sajó→ Tisza→ Danube→ Black Sea

The Torysa (Slovak pronunciation: [ˈtɔrisa], Hungarian: Tarca) is a river in eastern Slovakia. Its source is in the Levoča Mountains and it flows through the towns of: Lipany, Sabinov, Veľký Šariš, Prešov, and into the Hornád river near Nižná Hutka, southeast of Košice. It is 124 km (77 mi) long and its basin size is 1,349 km^{2} (521 sq mi).
