= Eastern Slovak Flat =

Coordinates: 48°37′N 21°55′E

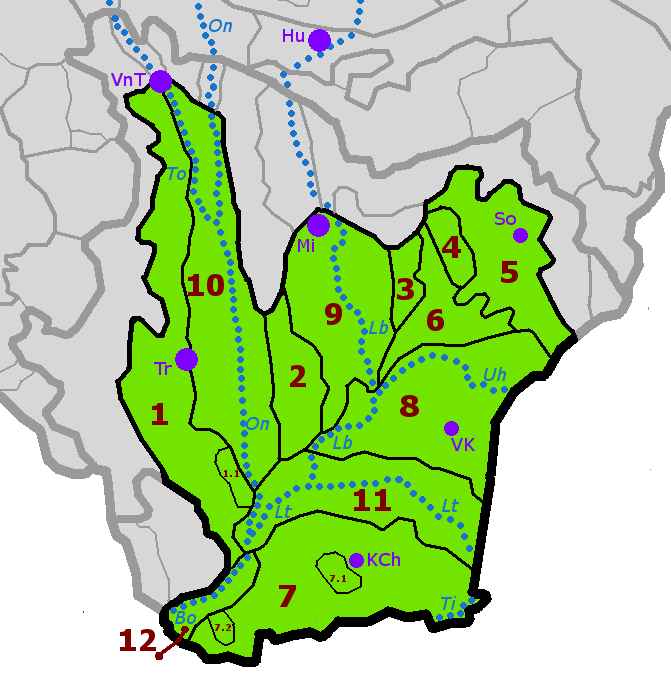
Eastern Slovak Plain with its subdivisions (click the map for legend)

The East(ern) Slovak Flat (Slovak: Východoslovenská rovina), also translated as Eastern Slovak Plain, is the lower, flat part of the Eastern Slovak Lowland.

Important towns: Trebišov, Michalovce, Veľké Kapušany, Kráľovský Chlmec, Sobrance

== Division ==
- Trebišovská tabuľa (Trebišov Table)
- Ondavská rovina (Ondava Flat)
- Malčická tabuľa (Malčice Table)
- Laborecká rovina (Laborec Flat)
- Iňačovská tabuľa (Iňačovce Table)
- Závadská tabuľa (Závadka Table)
- Sobranecká rovina (Sobrance Flat)
- Senianska mokraď (Senné Wet Ground)
- Kapušianske pláňavy (Kapušany Flatlands)
- Latorická rovina (Latorica Flat)
- Medzibodrocké pláňavy ("Inter-Bodrog" Flatlands)
- Bodrocká rovina (Bodrog Flat)

== Geography ==
The plain is mostly covered by loess, river sediment, loess clays and sands. The plain is punctuated with volcanic formations, such as Chlmecké kopce or Tarbucka.

Important rivers are Bodrog and its tributaries Ondava, Laborec, Latorica, Uh, and Topľa. A system of protective dikes and drainage canals has been built, because the Bodrog tributaries had often caused floods. Subterranean water supplies can be found here. Cold sulphur and hydrogen acidulous waters are used at the Sobrance health resort. Many meadows can be found in the flat.

Arable land prevails in the Latorica Flat, where the Latorica Nature Park is also situated. Meadows, swamps and swamp forests are protected habitats (Zatínske močiare, Veľké jazero) within nature preserves (Latorický luh I and II, Zemplínska jelšina). Rare water and swamp flora and fauna is also preserved in the Tajba reserve.
