= Kuzmice, Trebišov District =

Kuzmice Kozma
- Municipality
- Flag Coat of arms

- Location of Kuzmice in the Košice Region Location of Kuzmice in Slovakia
- Coordinates: 48.58°N 21.57°E
- Country: Slovakia
- Region: Košice Region
- District: Trebišov District
- First mentioned: 1270

Area
  - Total: 13.53 km^{2} (5.22 sq mi)
- Elevation: 168 m (551 ft)

Population (2025)
  - Total: 1,746
- Time zone: UTC+1 (CET)
  - Summer (DST): UTC+2 (CEST)
- Postal code: 761 2
- Area code: +421 56
- Vehicle registration plate (until 2022): TV
- Website: kuzmice.eu

Kuzmice (Hungarian: Kozma) is a village and municipality in the Trebišov District in the Košice Region of eastern Slovakia.

== History ==
The village was first mentioned in year 1270, when it was called "Kosma". The village was renamed to "Kozmay" in 1327, in year 1427 to "Kozmafalwa", but in year 1773, village was renamed to Kuzmice. Village was than called "Kuznice" from year 1920 to year 1927, when it was renamed back to Kuzmice.

== Population ==
Population statistic (10 years)
Year	1995	2005	2015	2025
Count	1387	1666	1719	1746
Difference		+20.11%	+3.18%	+1.57%

Population statistic
Year	2024	2025
Count	1744	1746
Difference		+0.11%

It has a population of 1746 people (31 December 2025).

=== Ethnicity ===
Census 2021 (1+ %)
Ethnicity	Number	Fraction
Slovak	1585	93.01%
Not found out	109	6.39%
Romani	26	1.52%
Total	1704	

In year 2021 was 1704 people by ethnicity 1585 as Slovak, 109 as Not found out, 26 as Romani, 7 as Hungarian, 6 as Czech, 2 as Serbian, 2 as Canadian, 1 as Rusyn and 1 as Other.

Note on population: The difference values of population numbers in the table "Population statistic" and in the sections "Ethnicity" & "Religion" is caused by the use of various statistical methods.

=== Religion ===
Census 2021 (1+ %)
Religion	Number	Fraction
Roman Catholic Church	925	54.28%
Greek Catholic Church	544	31.92%
Not found out	121	7.1%
None	71	4.17%
Calvinist Church	19	1.12%
Total	1704	

In year 2021 was 1704 people by religion 925 from Roman Catholic Church, 544 from Greek Catholic Church, 121 from Not found out, 71 from None, 19 from Calvinist Church, 16 from Eastern Orthodox Church, 3 from Other, 3 from Ad hoc movements, 1 from Evangelical Church and 1 from Apostolic Church.
