= Fričovce =

- Municipality
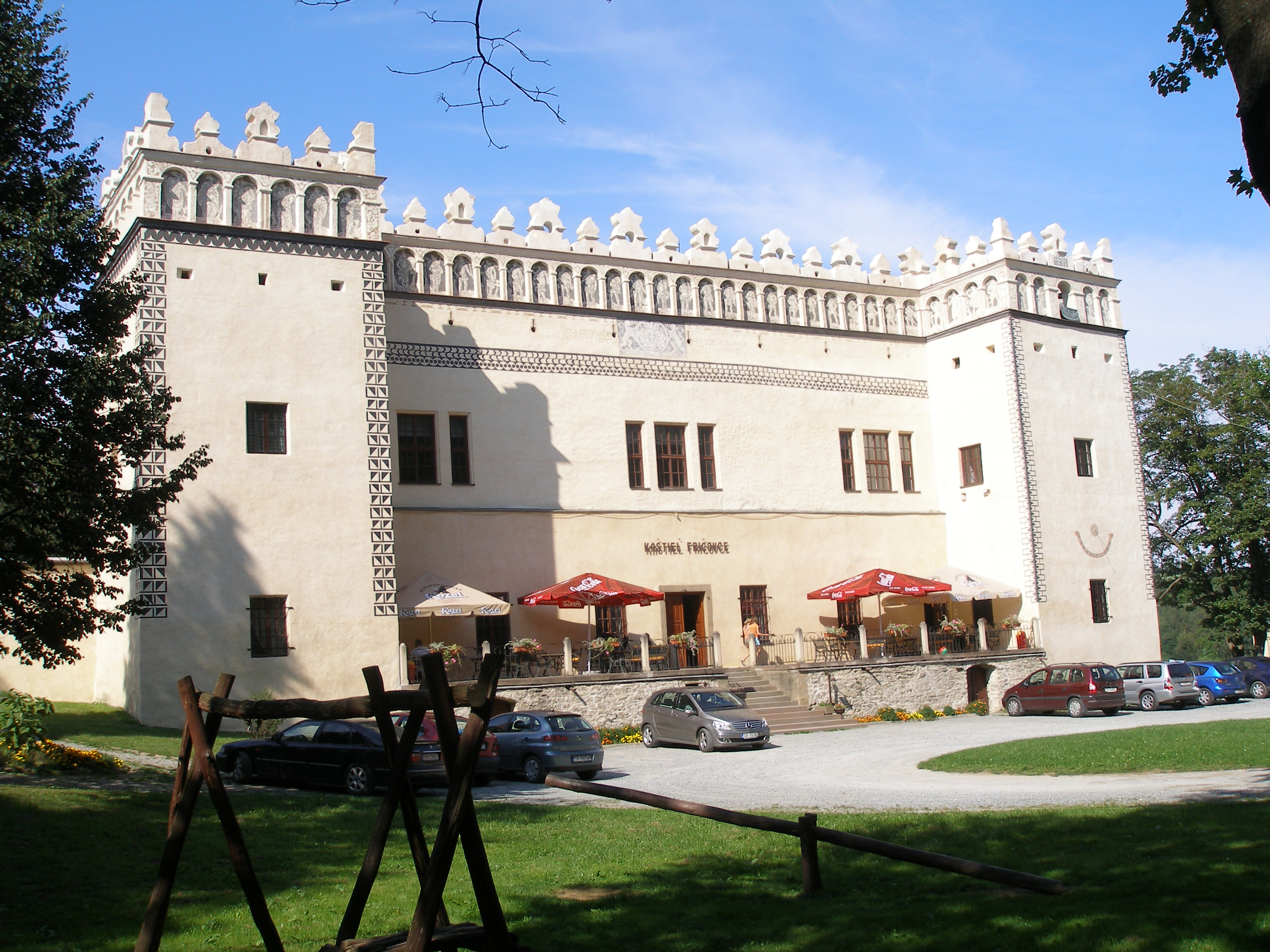

- Flag

- Location of Fričovce in the Prešov Region Location of Fričovce in Slovakia
- Coordinates: 49.02°N 20.97°E
- Country: Slovakia
- Region: Prešov Region
- District: Prešov District
- First mentioned: 1320

Area
  - Total: 8.57 km^{2} (3.31 sq mi)
- Elevation: 452 m (1,483 ft)

Population (2025)
  - Total: 1,118
- Time zone: UTC+1 (CET)
  - Summer (DST): UTC+2 (CEST)
- Postal code: 823 7
- Area code: +421 51
- Vehicle registration plate (until 2022): PO
- Website: www.obecfricovce.sk

Fričovce (Hungarian: Frics) is a village and municipality in Prešov District in the Prešov Region of eastern Slovakia.

== History ==
In historical records the village was first mentioned in 1320. One of the oldest breweries in the country can be found there, Zapovca.

== Geography ==
The municipality lies at an altitude of 452 metres (1,483 ft) and covers an area of 8.57 km^{2} (3.31 sq mi) (2025).

== Population ==
Population statistic (10 years)
Year	1995	2005	2015	2025
Count	1063	1088	1126	1118
Difference		+2.35%	+3.49%	−0.71%

Population statistic
Year	2024	2025
Count	1117	1118
Difference		+0.08%

It has a population of 1118 people (31 December 2025).

=== Ethnicity ===
Census 2021 (1+ %)
Ethnicity	Number	Fraction
Slovak	1093	96.21%
Not found out	43	3.78%
Romani	29	2.55%
Total	1136	

In year 2021 was 1136 people by ethnicity 1093 as Slovak, 43 as Not found out, 29 as Romani, 4 as Ukrainian, 2 as Czech, 2 as Other, 1 as Italian and 1 as Hungarian.

Note on population: The difference values of population numbers in the table "Population statistic" and in the sections "Ethnicity" & "Religion" is caused by the use of various statistical methods.

=== Religion ===
Census 2021 (1+ %)
Religion	Number	Fraction
Roman Catholic Church	1010	88.91%
None	52	4.58%
Not found out	38	3.35%
Greek Catholic Church	13	1.14%
Total	1136	

In year 2021 was 1136 people by religion 1010 from Roman Catholic Church, 52 from None, 38 from Not found out, 13 from Greek Catholic Church, 6 from Other and not ascertained christian church, 2 from Calvinist Church, 2 from Paganism and natural spirituality, 2 from Christian Congregations in Slovakia, 2 from Islam, 2 from Evangelical Church, 2 from Ad hoc movements, 1 from Eastern Orthodox Church, 1 from Other, 1 from Church of the Brethren, 1 from Buddhism and 1 from Apostolic Church.

== Genealogical resources ==
The records for genealogical research are available at the state archive "Statny Archiv in Presov, Slovakia"

- Roman Catholic church records (births/marriages/deaths): 1788–1895 (parish A)
- Greek Catholic church records (births/marriages/deaths): 1834–1895 (parish B)

== See also ==
- List of municipalities and towns in Slovakia
