= Choč Mountains =

Mountain range in Slovakia

Coordinates: 49°10′N 19°20′E

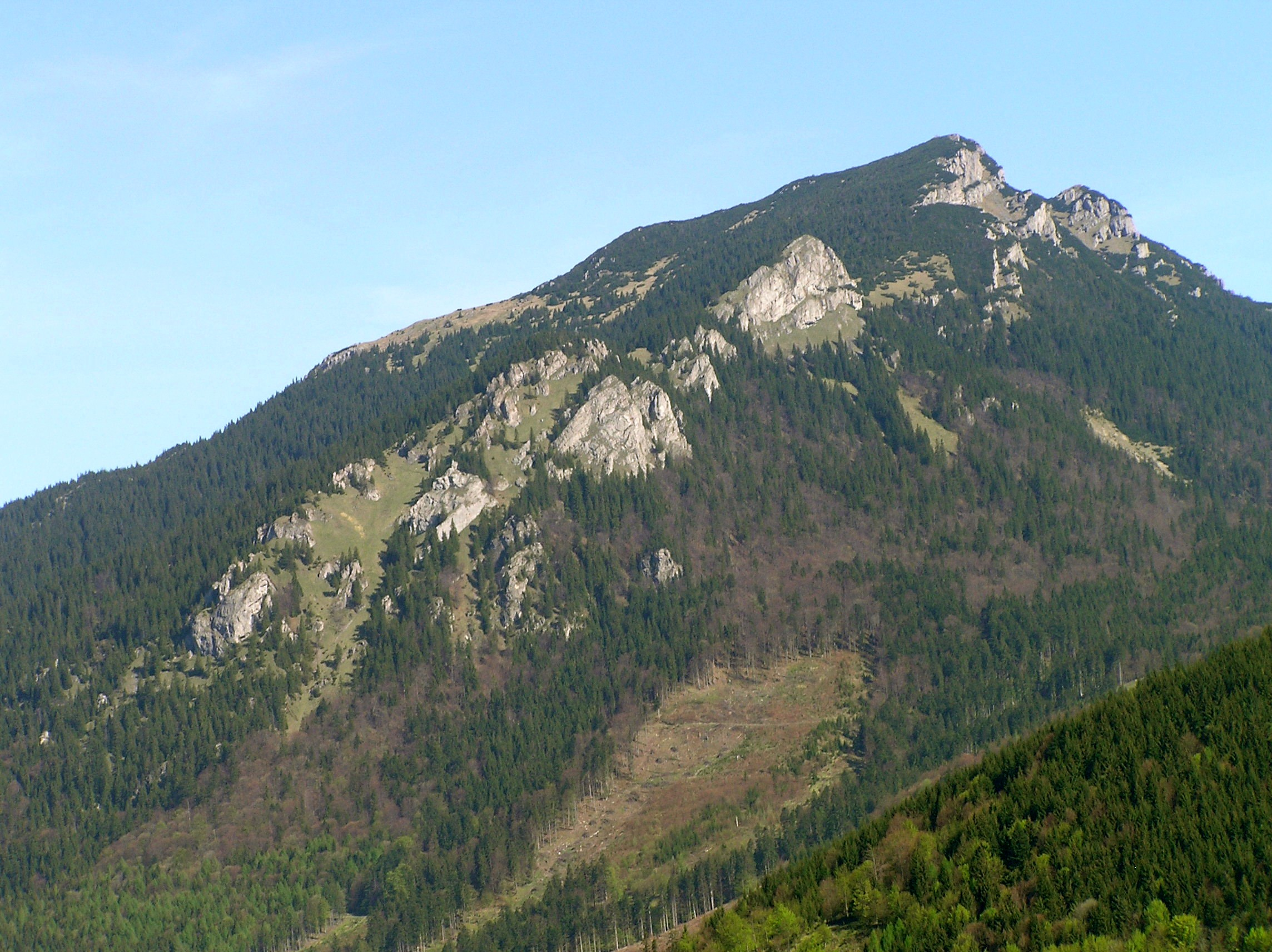
Veľký Choč, highest peak of the Choč Mountains

The Choč Mountains (in Slovak, Chočské vrchy) are a range of mountains in north-central Slovakia, a portion of the Fatra-Tatra Area of the Inner Western Carpathians. The range is 24 kilometers long and on average only 4 kilometers wide. Highest peak is Veľký Choč at 1 611 metres above sea level.

== Location ==
Choč Mountains are bordered:

- in the northwest by the Orava Highlands,
- in the northeast by the valley of the Podtatranská Brázda,
- in the east by the Western Tatras,
- the south by the basin of the Podtatranská kotlina,
- in the southwest by Greater Fatra

== Highest Peaks ==
- Veľký Choč, 1611 metres
- Malý Choč, 1465 metres
- Prosečné, 1371 metres
- Holica, 1340 metres
- Lomná, 1278 metres

== See also ==
- Tatra Mountains
- Tourism in Slovakia
