= Sub-Tatra Trench =

Sub-Tatra Trench Rów Podtatrzański
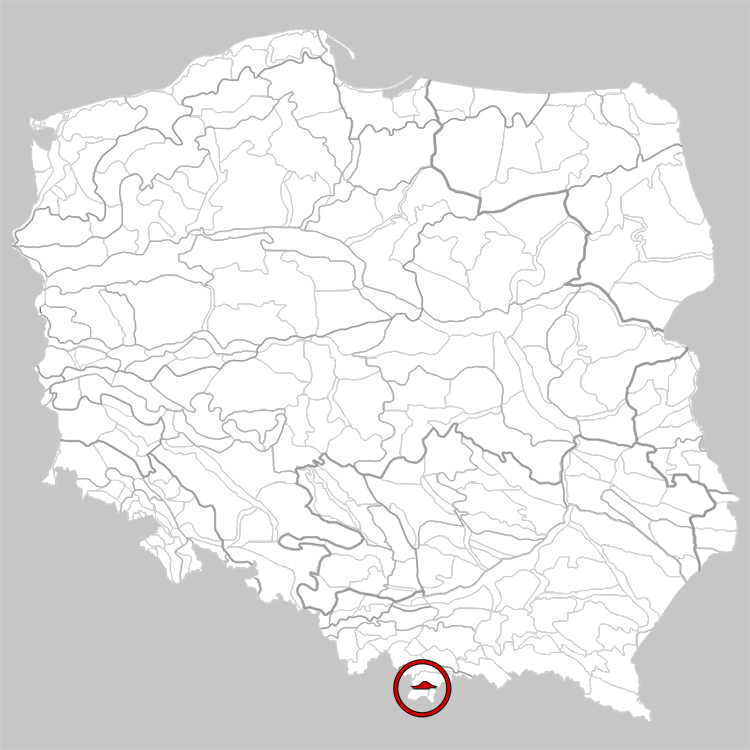
- Location of the Podtatrzański Trench in Poland
- Coordinates: 49.29657°N 19.97005°E
- Country: Poland

Area
  - Total: 130 km^{2} (50 sq mi)

Sub-Tatra Trench (Polish: Rów Podtatrzański; Slovak: Podtatranská brázda) (514.14) is a mesoregion located below the Tatra Mountains, part of the Orava-Podhale Depression. The trench divides the Choč and Tatra Mountains from the Spiš–Gubałówka Highlands.

The region has an elevation of between 700 and 1000 m.a.s.l. It is formed from Eocene marlstone slates (Podhalański Flysch). In Poland, the area has a total length of 20 km and a total surface area of 130 km². The regional valleys incline in the north, covered with alluvial fans, formed via upper course river flow. The Zakopane Valley has three gravel top soil coverings from three separate glacial periods. The western part and eastern borderlands of the Podtatrzański Trench are forested. The main brooks that drain through the valley are the Czarny Dunajec, as well as the Zakopianka and Poroniec (sources of Biały Dunajec).

The region is characterised by the settlement areas of Zakopane, as well as Kościelisko, Małe Ciche and Murzasichle.

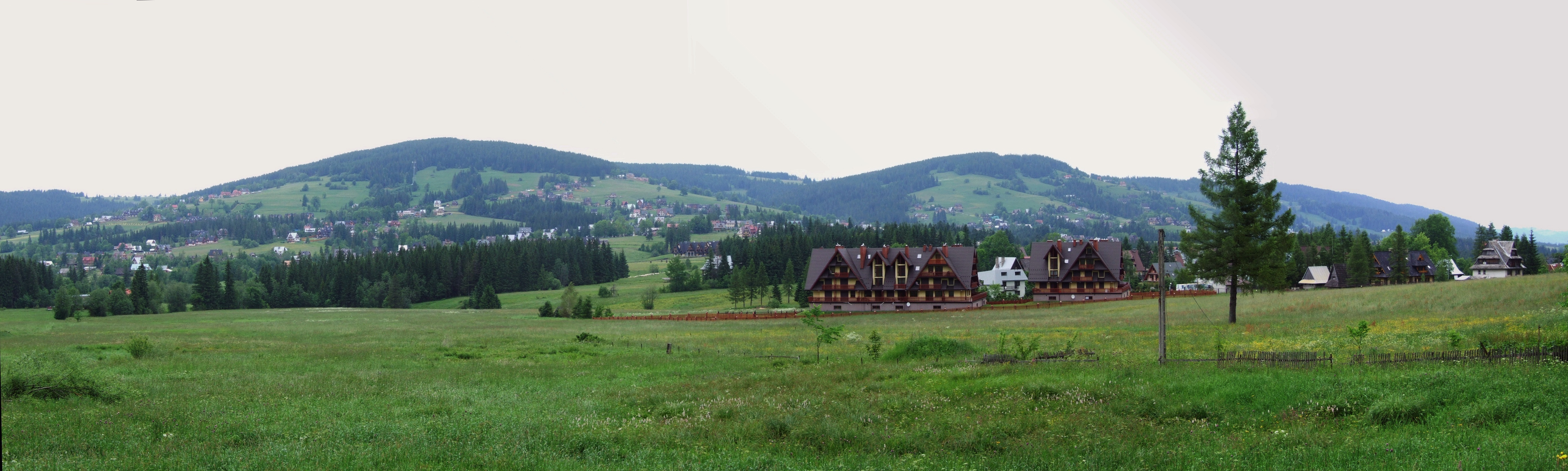
Kościeliska Valley and Gubałowski Foothills
