= Dargov =

Dargov Dargó
- Municipality
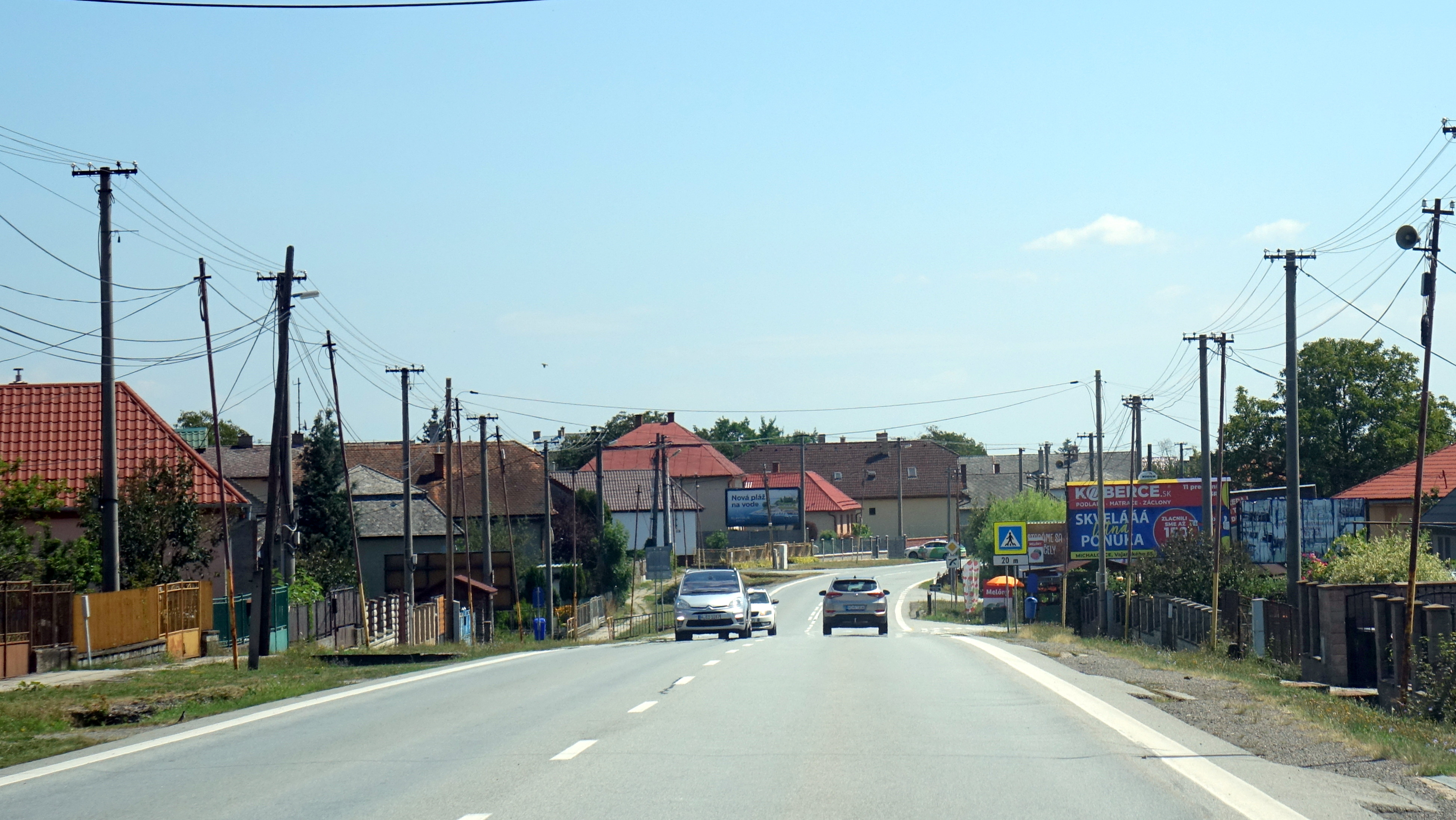

- Flag

- Location of Dargov in the Košice Region Location of Dargov in Slovakia
- Coordinates: 48.73°N 21.58°E
- Country: Slovakia
- Region: Košice Region
- District: Trebišov District
- First mentioned: 1458

Area
  - Total: 21.87 km^{2} (8.44 sq mi)
- Elevation: 259 m (850 ft)

Population (2025)
  - Total: 629
- Time zone: UTC+1 (CET)
  - Summer (DST): UTC+2 (CEST)
- Postal code: 766 1
- Area code: +421 56
- Vehicle registration plate (until 2022): TV
- Website: www.dargov.net

Dargov (Slovak pronunciation: [ˈdarɡɔw]; 1948–1964 Drahov; Hungarian: Dargó) is a village and municipality in the Trebišov District in the Košice Region of eastern Slovakia.

== Geography ==
The municipality lies at an altitude of 259 metres (850 ft) and covers an area of 21.87 km^{2} (8.44 sq mi) (2025).

== History ==
The village was first mentioned as Dorgo in a charter in 1458. It belonged to several owners: the nobles Semsey and Széchy, the castle of Sečovce (Csapy family), and a part of the town of Trebišov. In the 19th century it belonged to the noble landowners Andrássy, Berzeviczy and Forgách. In 1944, it was burned down by the German Army.

== Population ==
Population statistic (10 years)
Year	1995	2005	2015	2025
Count	520	538	595	629
Difference		+3.46%	+10.59%	+5.71%

Population statistic
Year	2024	2025
Count	636	629
Difference		−1.10%

It has a population of 629 people (31 December 2025).

=== Ethnicity ===
Census 2021 (1+ %)
Ethnicity	Number	Fraction
Slovak	593	97.69%
Not found out	11	1.81%
Rusyn	7	1.15%
Total	607	

In year 2021 was 607 people by ethnicity 593 as Slovak, 11 as Not found out, 7 as Rusyn, 3 as Czech, 2 as English, 1 as Ukrainian, 1 as German and 1 as Other.

Note on population: The difference values of population numbers in the table "Population statistic" and in the sections "Ethnicity" & "Religion" is caused by the use of various statistical methods.

=== Religion ===
Census 2021 (1+ %)
Religion	Number	Fraction
Roman Catholic Church	302	49.75%
Greek Catholic Church	230	37.89%
None	52	8.57%
Not found out	8	1.32%
Total	607	

In year 2021 was 607 people by religion 302 from Roman Catholic Church, 230 from Greek Catholic Church, 52 from None, 8 from Not found out, 4 from Eastern Orthodox Church, 3 from Calvinist Church, 3 from Other and not ascertained christian church, 3 from Evangelical Church, 1 from Paganism and natural spirituality and 1 from Buddhism.

== Genealogical resources ==
The records for genealogical research are available at the state archive "Statny Archiv in Kosice, Slovakia"

== See also ==
- List of municipalities and towns in Slovakia
