= Kazimír =

Village and municipality in Slovakia

Kazimír Kázmér
- Municipality
- Flag

- Location of Kazimír in the Košice Region Location of Kazimír in Slovakia
- Coordinates: 48.53°N 21.58°E
- Country: Slovakia
- Region: Košice Region
- District: Trebišov District
- First mentioned: 1270

Government
  - Mayor: Tomáš Toma

Area
  - Total: 9.92 km^{2} (3.83 sq mi)
- Elevation: 154 m (505 ft)

Population (2025)
  - Total: 796
- Time zone: UTC+1 (CET)
  - Summer (DST): UTC+2 (CEST)
- Postal code: 761 3
- Area code: +421 56
- Vehicle registration plate (until 2022): TV
- Website: kazimir.sk

Kazimír (Hungarian: Kázmér) is a village and municipality in the Trebišov District in the Košice Region of eastern Slovakia.

== Geography ==
The municipality lies at an altitude of 154 metres (505 ft) and covers an area of 9.92 km^{2} (3.83 sq mi) (2025).

== Population ==
Population statistic (10 years)
| Year | 1995 | 2005 | 2015 | 2025 |
|---|---|---|---|---|
| Count | 920 | 878 | 866 | 796 |
| Difference | | −4.56% | −1.36% | −8.08% |

Population statistic
| Year | 2024 | 2025 |
|---|---|---|
| Count | 813 | 796 |
| Difference | | −2.09% |

It has a population of 796 people (31 December 2025).

=== Ethnicity ===
Census 2021 (1+ %)
| Ethnicity | Number | Fraction |
|---|---|---|
| Slovak | 810 | 96.54% |
| Not found out | 28 | 3.33% |
| Total | 839 | |

In year 2021 was 839 people by ethnicity 810 as Slovak, 28 as Not found out, 4 as Czech, 3 as Hungarian, 2 as Ukrainian, 2 as Rusyn and 2 as Other.

Note on population: The difference values of population numbers in the table "Population statistic" and in the sections "Ethnicity" & "Religion" is caused by the use of various statistical methods.

=== Religion ===
Census 2021 (1+ %)
| Religion | Number | Fraction |
|---|---|---|
| Roman Catholic Church | 478 | 56.97% |
| Greek Catholic Church | 207 | 24.67% |
| None | 62 | 7.39% |
| Calvinist Church | 35 | 4.17% |
| Not found out | 26 | 3.1% |
| Eastern Orthodox Church | 17 | 2.03% |
| Total | 839 | |

In year 2021 was 839 people by religion 478 from Roman Catholic Church, 207 from Greek Catholic Church, 62 from None, 35 from Calvinist Church, 26 from Not found out, 17 from Eastern Orthodox Church, 5 from Other and not ascertained christian church, 4 from Evangelical Church, 3 from Ad hoc movements, 1 from Jehovah's Witnesses and 1 from United Methodist Church.

== Genealogical resources ==
The records for genealogical research are available at the state archive "Statny Archiv in Kosice, Slovakia"

- Roman Catholic church records (births/marriages/deaths): 1774-1900 (parish A)
- Greek Catholic church records (births/marriages/deaths): 1826-1933 (parish B)
- Lutheran church records (births/marriages/deaths): 1827-1893 (parish B)
- Reformated church records (births/marriages/deaths): 1800-1893 (parish B)

== See also ==
- List of municipalities and towns in Slovakia
