= Eastern Slovak Lowland =

Coordinates: 48°30′N 22°00′E

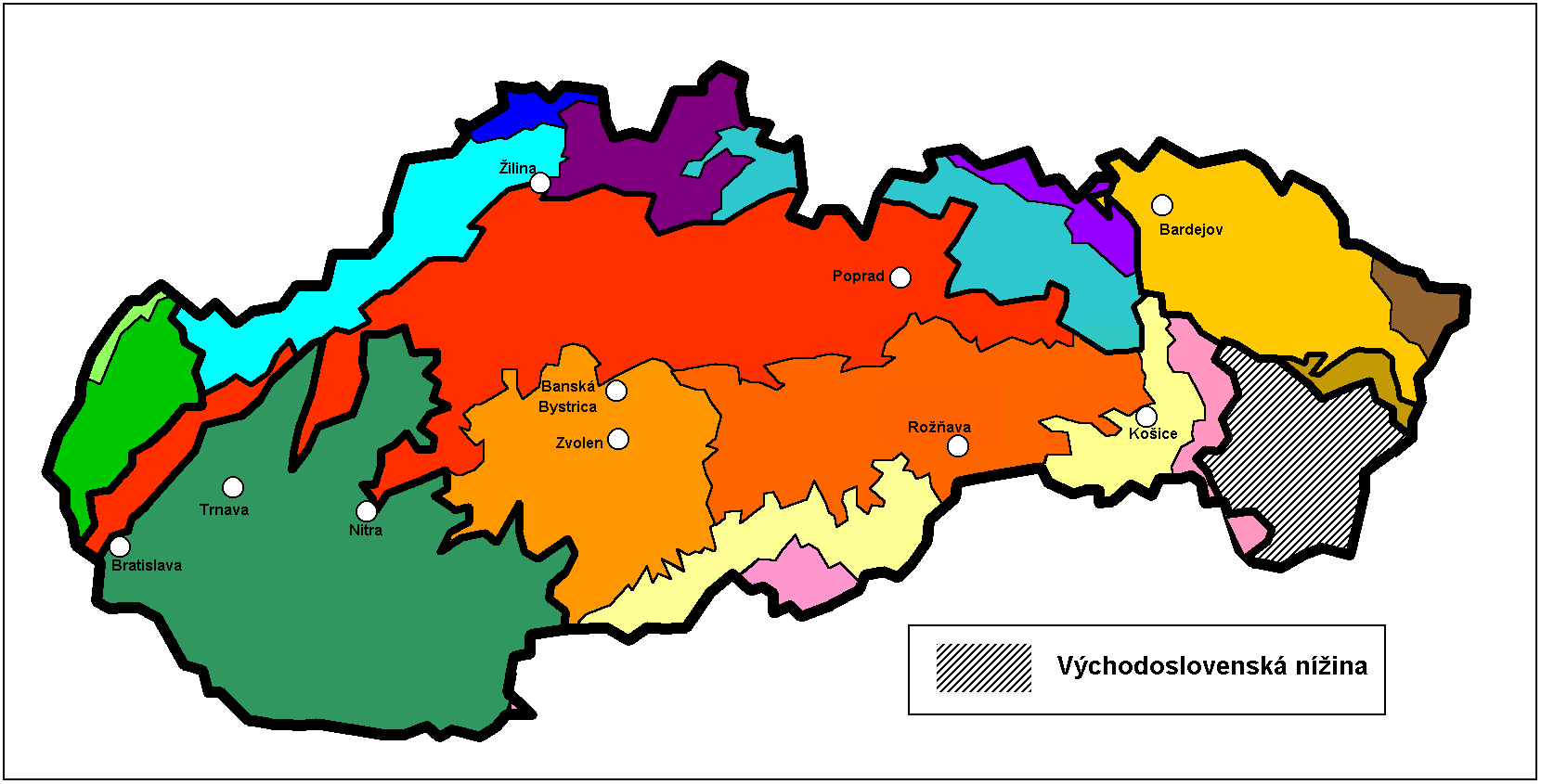
Eastern Slovak Lowland is located in southeastern Slovakia

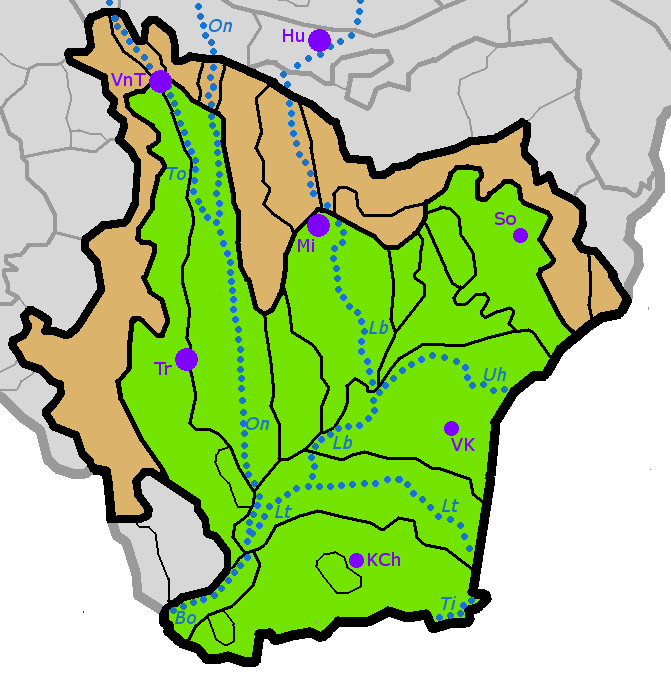
Eastern Slovak Plain Eastern Slovak Hills

The East(ern) Slovak Lowland (Slovak: Východoslovenská nížina) is the name of a part of the Great Hungarian Plain (Slovak: Veľká dunajská kotlina) situated in Slovakia.

In terms of geomorphology, it forms one unit together with the Tisza Lowland (Tiszamenti síkság) in Hungary, the Transcarpathian Lowland (Zakarpats'ka nyzovyna) in Ukraine, and the plain Câmpia Someşului in Romania.

It consists of the following two parts:

- Eastern Slovak Hills (also translated as Eastern Slovak Upland) in the west and the north; and
- Eastern Slovak Flat (also translated as Eastern Slovak Plain) in the middle, east and south.
