= Tajba =

National nature reserve in Slovakia

Coordinates: 48°23′11.6″N 21°46′14.10″E

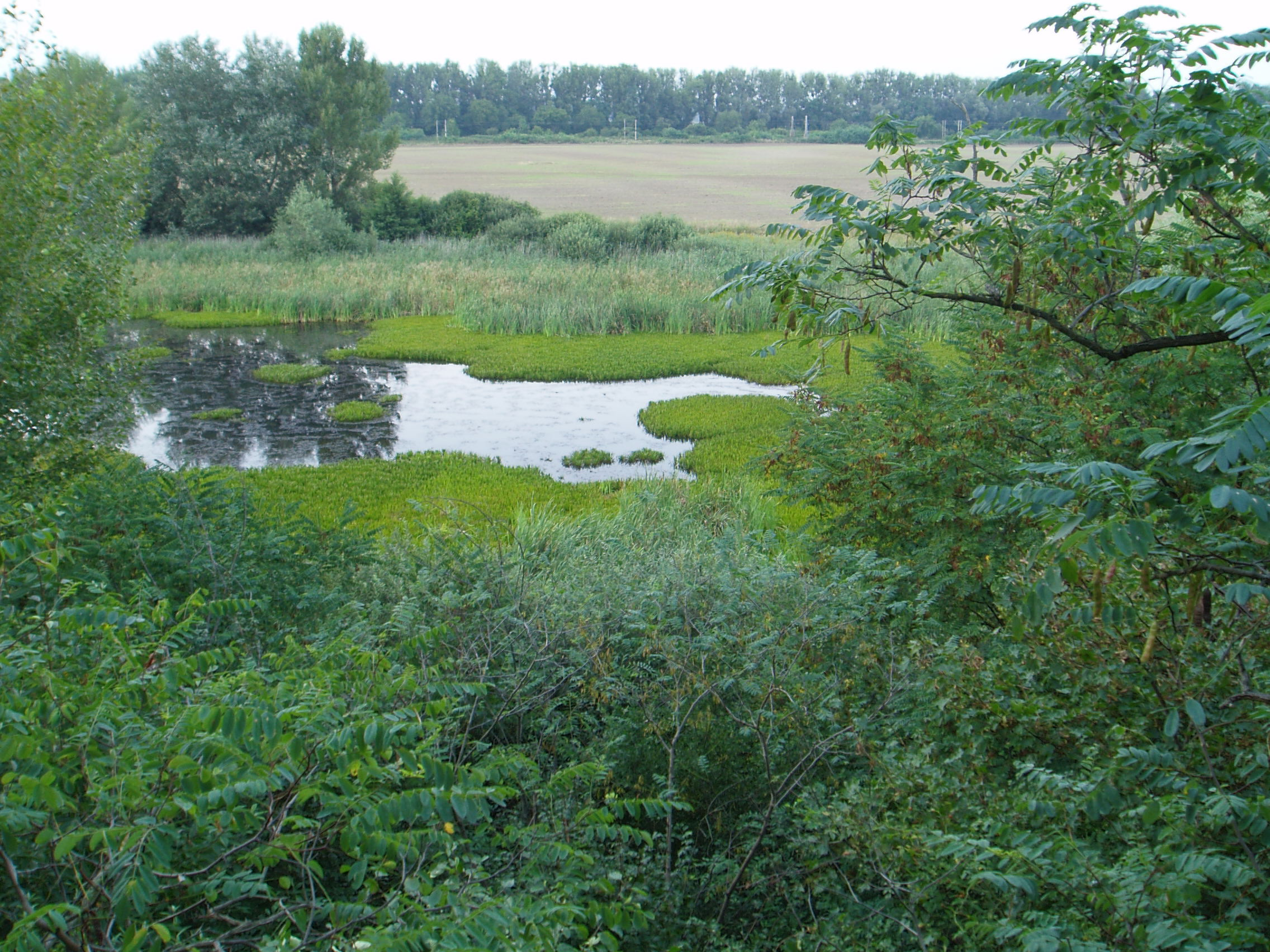
Tajba

Tajba is a National Natural Reserve in the municipality of Streda nad Bodrogom in Slovakia. It is situated around an oxbow of the River Bodrog.

The territory measures 273,600 square metres (67.6 acres) and it is a home of rare marsh communities. Species include the European pond turtle (Emys orbicularis), which is listed in the Red Book of Endangered Species as a critically endangered.

On 25 May 1966 the Slovak Parliament approved the Tajba Reserve as a European pond turtle sanctuary.

However, from the very beginning the reserve was plagued by a number of serious problems: dredging and calcification of the water-bed, bulrush harvesting, the building of a duck-farm and poisoned baits for suppressing vermin at a nearby pheasantry. As if this catalogue of small disasters was not enough, oil spilled into the reserve from a neighbouring agricultural facility which releases its wastes into the water as a matter of course. Turtles were wiped out in the part of the reserve stricken by this contamination. Despite this, in 1986 Dr. Jozef Voskar registered a dynamic population of all age categories in the undamaged areas.

The worst catastrophe, however, was caused by the dredging of the nearby Bodrog river which resulted in a lowering of the water table and hence the water surface at Tajbe. The water surface dropped to the greatest extent in the parts of the reserve that remained unaffected by the oil spillage and the sewage. In consequence, the area where the turtles had laid their eggs was left 500 metres (1,600 ft) from the water's edge. Even if some of the fittest females were capable of reaching the pool, the newly hatched turtles would have no chance whatsoever of returning to the water.

The present situation at Tajba is an ecological disaster. The possibilities of recovery are currently being weighed; the Aqua-Tera club of the Košice University of Veterinary Medicíne would like to contribute to the rescue of the turtles by releasing the turtles it reared into the wild.
