= Žiar (mountain range) =

Mountain range in Slovakia

Coordinates: 48°57′28″N 18°45′39″E

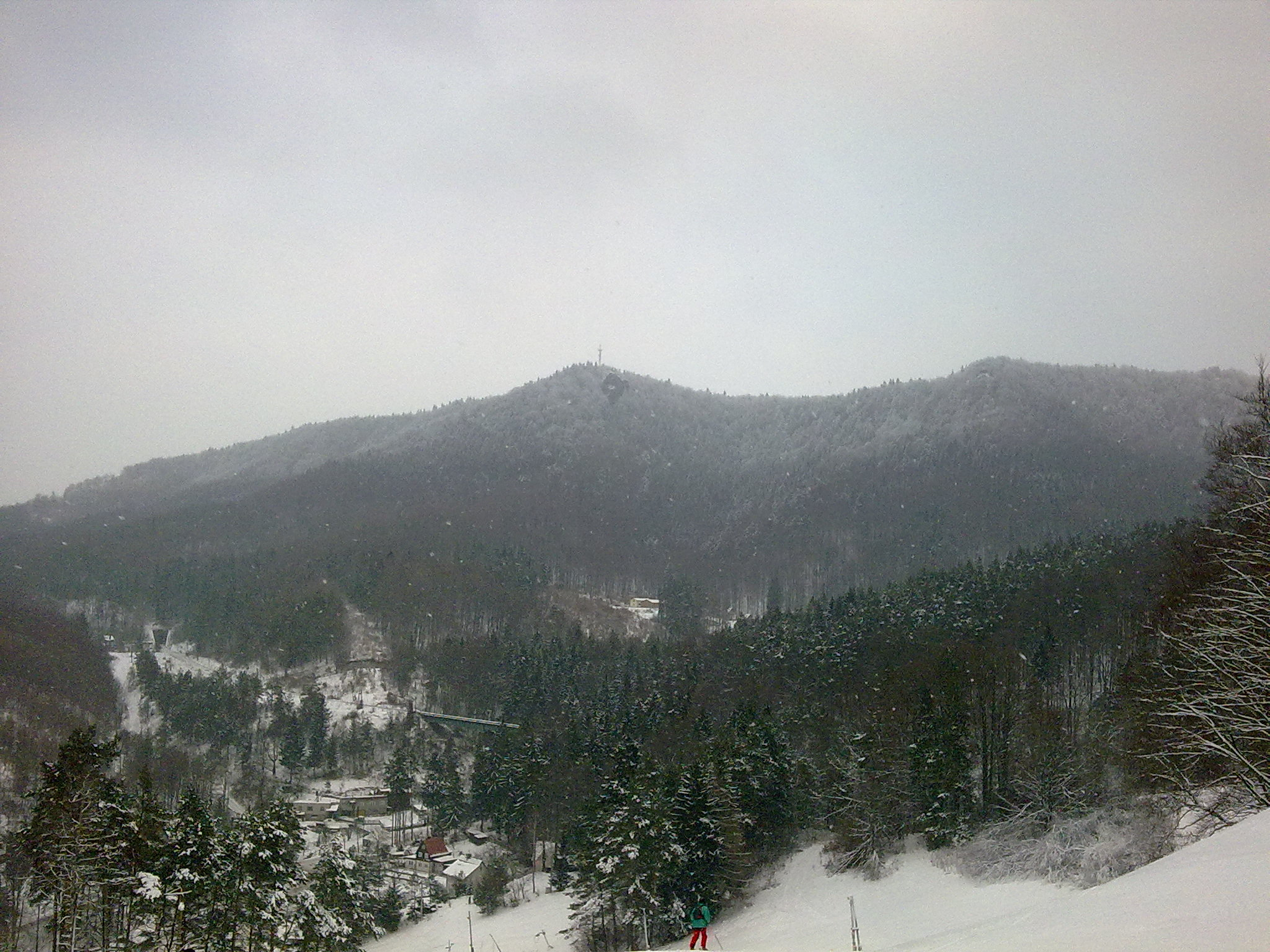
Bralova skala, a 757-metre (2,484 ft) landmark in southern Žiar

Žiar (Slovak pronunciation: [ˈʐɪɐr]) is a mountain range in the Trenčín Region of northwestern Slovakia, part of the ranges of the Fatra-Tatra Area of the Inner Western Carpathians.

The chain stretches from the northwest to southeast in a curved arc 30 kilometres (19 mi) long and 5 to 7 kilometres (3.1 to 4.3 mi) wide. Almost completely forested, the highest point of the range is Chlieviská (1,024 metres (3,360 ft)), in the northern part of the group.
