= Uhorská Ves =

- Municipality
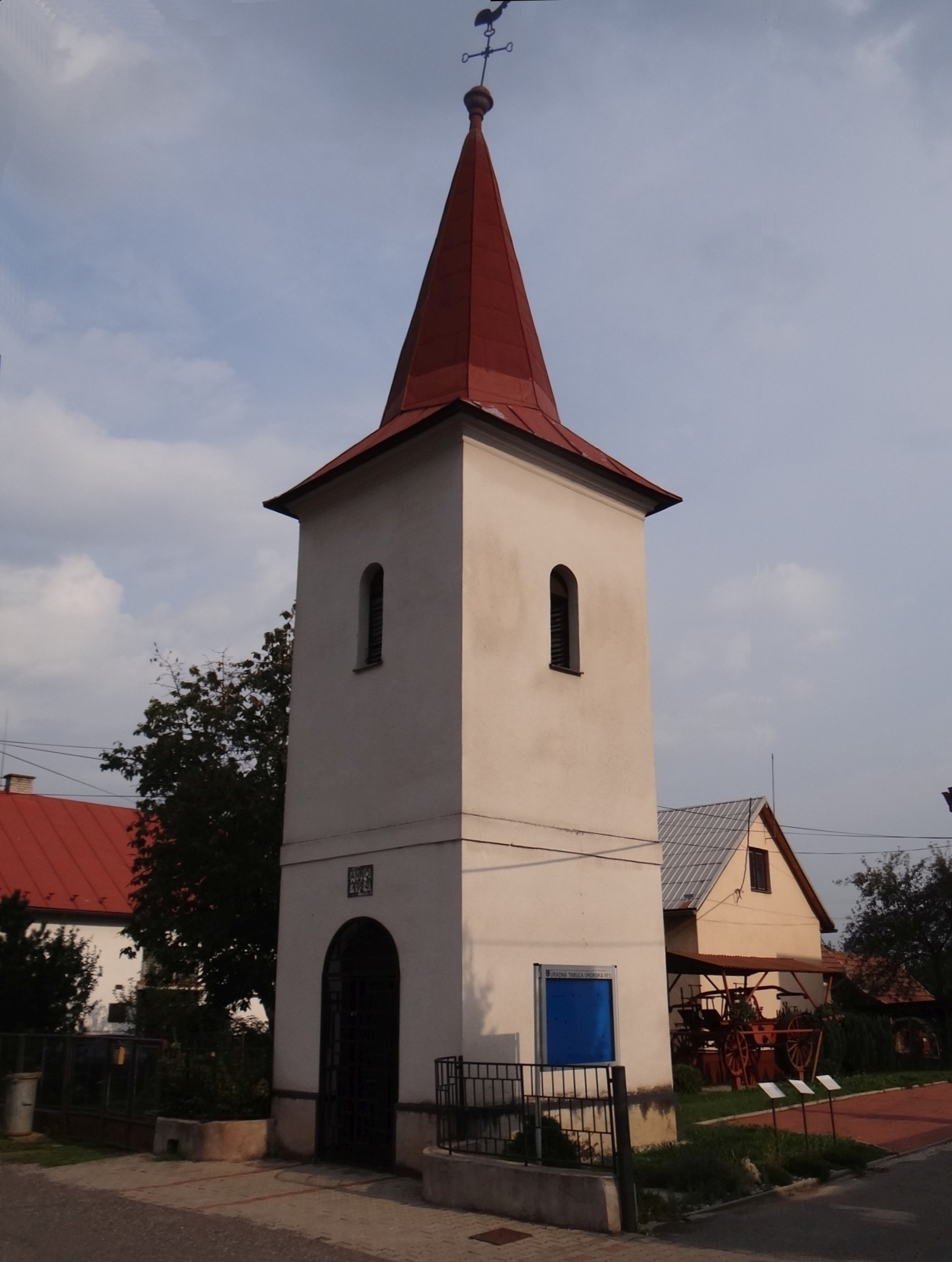

- Flag

- Location of Uhorská Ves in the Žilina Region Location of Uhorská Ves in Slovakia
- Coordinates: 49.07°N 19.68°E
- Country: Slovakia
- Region: Žilina Region
- District: Liptovský Mikuláš District
- First mentioned: 1230

Area
  - Total: 4.45 km^{2} (1.72 sq mi)
- Elevation: 607 m (1,991 ft)

Population (2025)
  - Total: 561
- Time zone: UTC+1 (CET)
  - Summer (DST): UTC+2 (CEST)
- Postal code: 310 3
- Area code: +421 44
- Vehicle registration plate (until 2022): LM
- Website: www.uhorskaves.sk

Uhorská Ves (Hungarian: Magyarfalu) is a village and municipality in Liptovský Mikuláš District in the Žilina Region of northern Slovakia.

== History ==
In historical records the village was first mentioned in 1230. Before the establishment of independent Czechoslovakia in 1918, it was part of Liptó County within the Kingdom of Hungary. From 1939 to 1945, it was part of the Slovak Republic.

== Geography ==
The municipality lies at an altitude of 607 metres (1,991 ft) and covers an area of 4.45 km^{2} (1.72 sq mi) (2025).

== Population ==
Population statistic (10 years)
Year	1995	2005	2015	2025
Count	426	426	473	561
Difference		+0%	+11.03%	+18.60%

Population statistic
Year	2024	2025
Count	573	561
Difference		−2.09%

It has a population of 561 people (31 December 2025).

=== Ethnicity ===
Census 2021 (1+ %)
Ethnicity	Number	Fraction
Slovak	517	96.27%
Not found out	14	2.6%
Romani	12	2.23%
Total	537	

In year 2021 was 537 people by ethnicity 517 as Slovak, 14 as Not found out, 12 as Romani, 2 as Other, 2 as English, 1 as Czech, 1 as Vietnamese, 1 as Rusyn, 1 as Hungarian and 1 as French.

Note on population: The difference values of population numbers in the table "Population statistic" and in the sections "Ethnicity" & "Religion" is caused by the use of various statistical methods.

=== Religion ===
Census 2021 (1+ %)
Religion	Number	Fraction
None	236	43.95%
Roman Catholic Church	138	25.7%
Evangelical Church	135	25.14%
Not found out	13	2.42%
Total	537	

In year 2021 was 537 people by religion 236 from None, 138 from Roman Catholic Church, 135 from Evangelical Church, 13 from Not found out, 5 from Apostolic Church, 4 from Greek Catholic Church, 3 from Ad hoc movements, 1 from Paganism and natural spirituality, 1 from Other and not ascertained christian church and 1 from Buddhism.
