= Fatra-Tatra Area =

Mountain range in the Western Carpathians

Fatra-Tatra
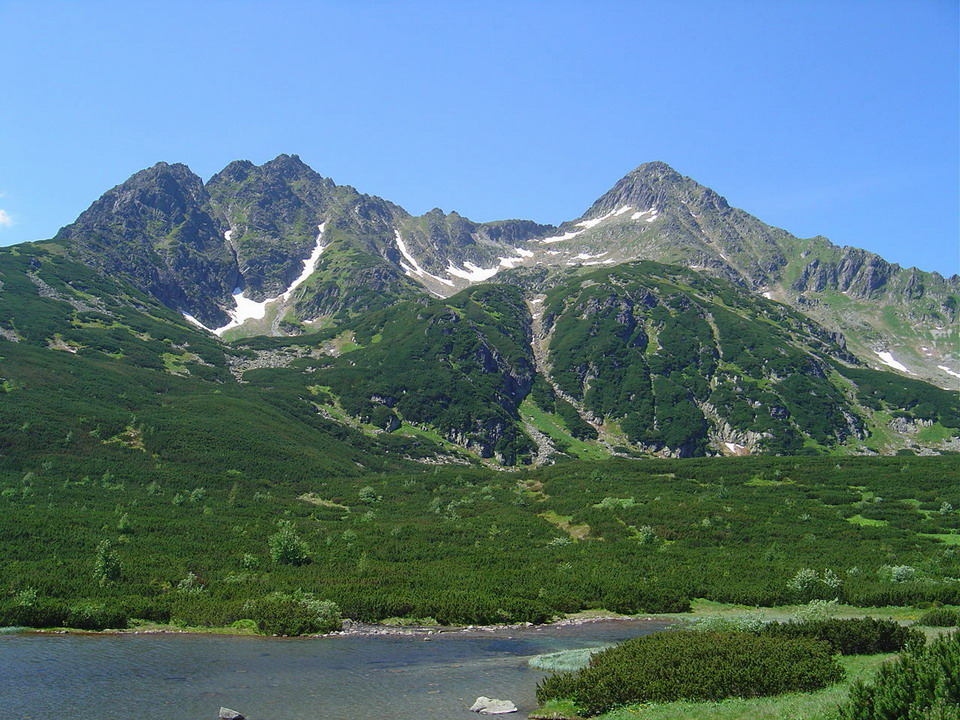
- Kolový štít and Jahňací štít over Veľké Biele Pleso

Highest point
- Peak: Gerlachovský štít
- Elevation: 2,655 m (8,711 ft)
- Coordinates: 49°10′N 20°8′E

Geography
- Location within Slovakia
- Countries: Slovakia, Austria and Poland
- Subdivisions: Branisko, Choč Mountains, Greater Fatra, Horehronské podolie, Hornád Basin, Kozie chrbty, Lesser Fatra, Little Carpathians, Low Tatras, Považský Inovec, Staré Hory Mountains, Strážov Mountains, Sub-Tatra Basin, Súľov Mountains, Tatras, Tríbeč, Turiec Basin, Upper Nitra Basin, Žilina Basin and Žiar
- Parent range: Inner Western Carpathians

Extent of the Fatra-Tatra Area (red) in Slovakia

The Fatra-Tatra Area (in geomorphology) or the Tatra-Fatra Belt of core mountains (in geology) is a part of the Inner Western Carpathians, a subprovince of the Western Carpathians. Most of the area lies in Slovakia with small parts reaching into Austria and Poland. The highest summit of the whole Carpathians, the Gerlachovský štít at 2,655 m (8,711 ft), lies in the High Tatras range which belongs to this area.

The Fatra-Tatra Area is from the northern side bounded by Pieniny Klippen Belt. Mountains of the area are located in two ranges. The external range consists of Hainburg Hills, Malé Karpaty (Pezinok part), Považský Inovec, Strážovské vrchy, Malá Fatra, Tatras (Western, High and Belianske Tatras). Inner range consists of Tribeč, Žiar, Veľká Fatra, Chočské vrchy, Ďumbier part of Nízke Tatry and massif of Smrekovica in the Branisko. The southern boundary of Area is the Čertovica line, south of which is the Vepor Belt.

The Tatra-Fatra Belt consists of Tatric alpine crystalline basement and its autochthonous sedimentary cover, over which the Subtatric nappes (Fatric and Hronic) were thrust.

The name core mountains is derived from the structural element, resistant crystalline basement rocks, preserved in the core of horsts, often forming the highest peaks of the mountains.

== Origin ==
The basement of the core mountains is formed by the Tatric Unit, which is composed of dominantly hercynian metamorphic and igneous rocks and locally also a sedimentary cover of various thickness. In the Paleozoic clastic and volcanoclastic sediments deposited in the area, but later during Hercynian orogeny, sediments were metamorphosed in the greenschist and amphibolite facies (forming large amount of paragneisses and amphibolites, only locally orthogneisses, phyllites and mica schists). Regional and contact metamorphism was induced also by intrusions of granites, which accompanied the Hercynian collision (generally in the Carboniferous). Basement rocks were later exposed due to erosion and at the end of the Paleozoic affected by marine transgression that lasted till the end of Mesozoic. During this period sedimentary rocks, known as Tatric cover units, deposited. They generally consists of clastic and carbonate rocks.

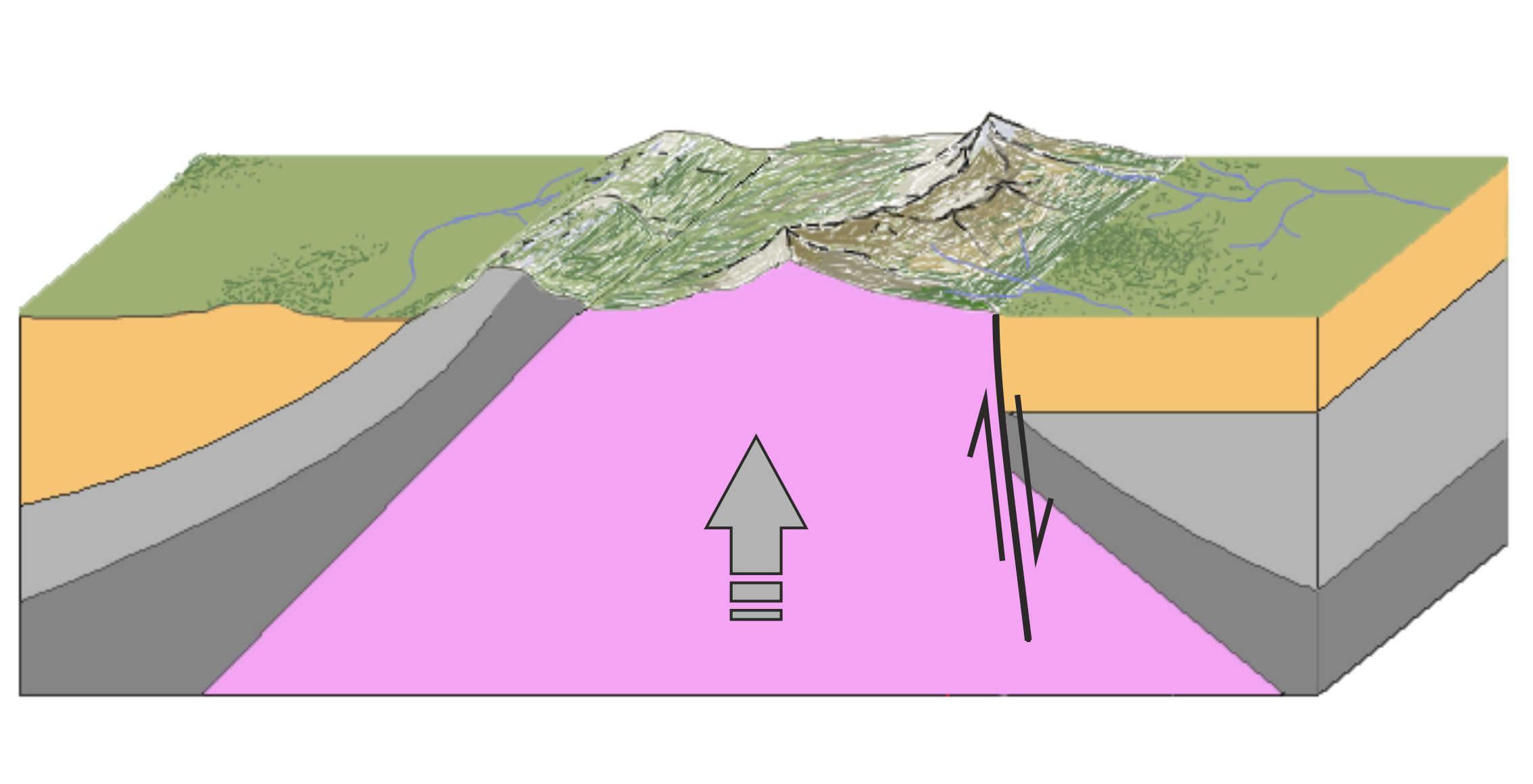
Schematic cross section through the core mountain: Cretaceous and Paleogene sedimentary cover Subtatric Nappes Tatric cover units Crystalline basement

In the Upper Cretaceous area of Tatric Unit, was affected by Eo-Alpine of Alpine Orogeny, that caused movement of large masses of rocks to the North and Northeast. To the South of the Tatric area a 2 superficial nappes, so called Subtatric Nappes, were detached and thrust over the Tatric. These nappes are generally composed of limestone, marl, dolomite and less by sandstones and slates. The lower nappes is called Krížna Nappe (or the Fatric) and the upper is Choč Nappe (or the Hronic). Krížňa Nappe is dominantly composed of rock, that were formed in the Zliechov basin. It was situated in the Fatric area between the Tatric and Veporic units. Fatric had the same basement as the Veporic unit and is considered as former northern part of Veporic, but later during the thrusting its substratum was consumed and subducted. Surface occurrences of Fatric basement remained only as a remnants in the northern part of Veporic Veľký Bok Unit and few other areas. Choč Nappe, was thrust from the southern area, but its roots were probably consumed entirely, so its paleogeographic position is not exactly known. Choč Nappe is considered as rootless nappe.

After the end of main Eo-Alpine orogenic movement, the area of Western Carpathians was still not so mountainous. In the Paleogene subsidence along the normal faults caused formation of grabens - intra-mountain Inner Carpathian Paleogene Basin and horsts present day mountain ranges. In the Neogene, further orogene movement in the external part of Carpathian arc caused formation of back-arc Pannonian Basin. Northern branches of Pannonian Basin were penetrating the Tatra-Fatra Area and formed inter-mountain basins. Simultaneously with the immersion of the horsts, ongoing and intense erosion is denuding the mountains and supplies the basin with clastic sediments. Among all of the rocks, the most erosion resistant were the crystalline schists and granites of the Tatric. Similar fold and thrust model of origin is known from the other areas of alpine system. In the English terminology, similar model is called Fault-block mountain, it is typical in the area of Basin and Range.
