= Spiš Magura =

Mountain ranges in northern Slovakia

Coordinates: 49°19′N 20°22′E

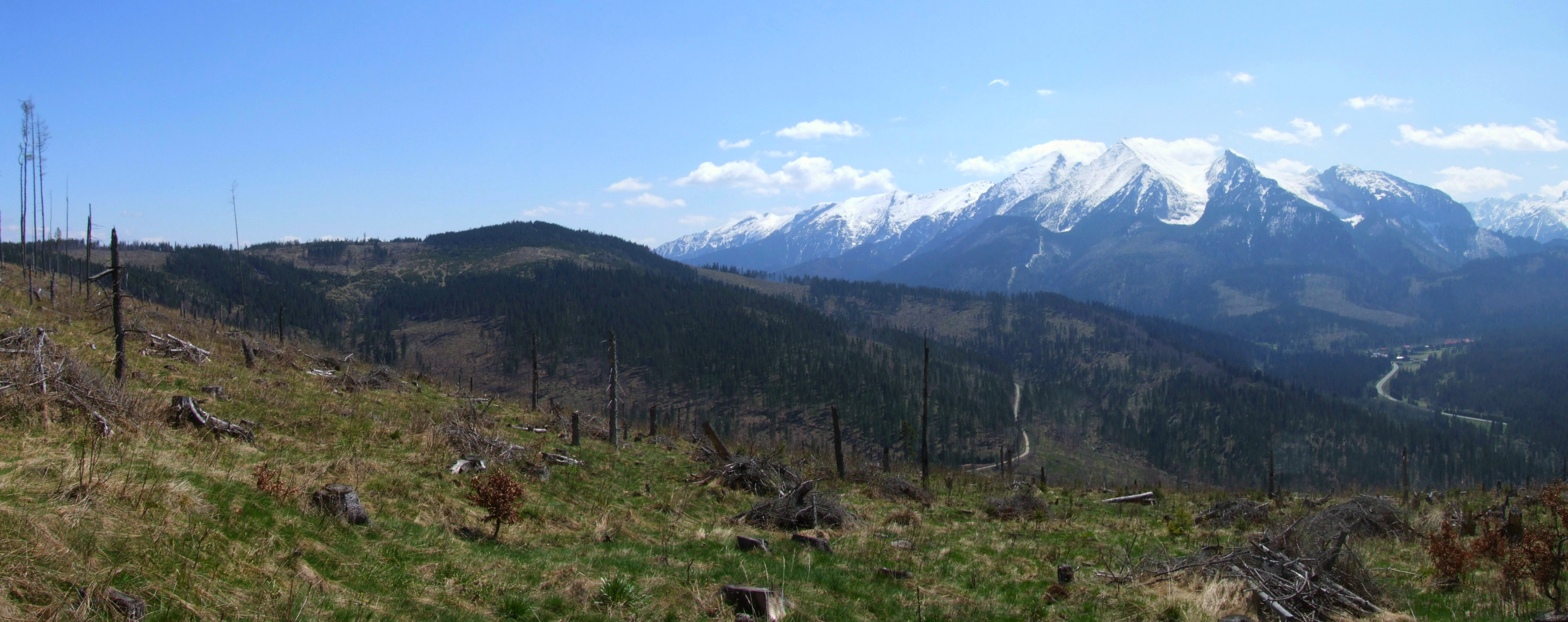
Repisko

The Spiš Magura (Slovak: Spišská Magura, Hungarian: Szepesi-Magura) is a set of mountain ranges in northern Slovakia, part of the Podhale-Magura Area region of the Outer Western Carpathians.

The western and northern boundaries of the Spiš Magura are the international border with Poland. Its highest point is Repisko (1259 meters).

== See also ==
- Geography of Slovakia
