= Kozie chrbty =

Coordinates: 49°02′N 20°10′E

The Kozie chrbty (In Slovak, literally "goat ridges") are a mountainous area in Slovakia, part of the Fatra-Tatra Area of the Inner Western Carpathians, where uranium ore may be found.

The place was previously known as Vikartovský ridge. The Kozie chrbty is located between the High Tatras and the Low Tatras, south and west of Poprad. They are drained by the river Váh to the west, and the rivers Hornád and Poprad to the east.
