= Branisko (mountain range) =

Mountain range in Slovakia

Coordinates: 49°05′N 20°55′E

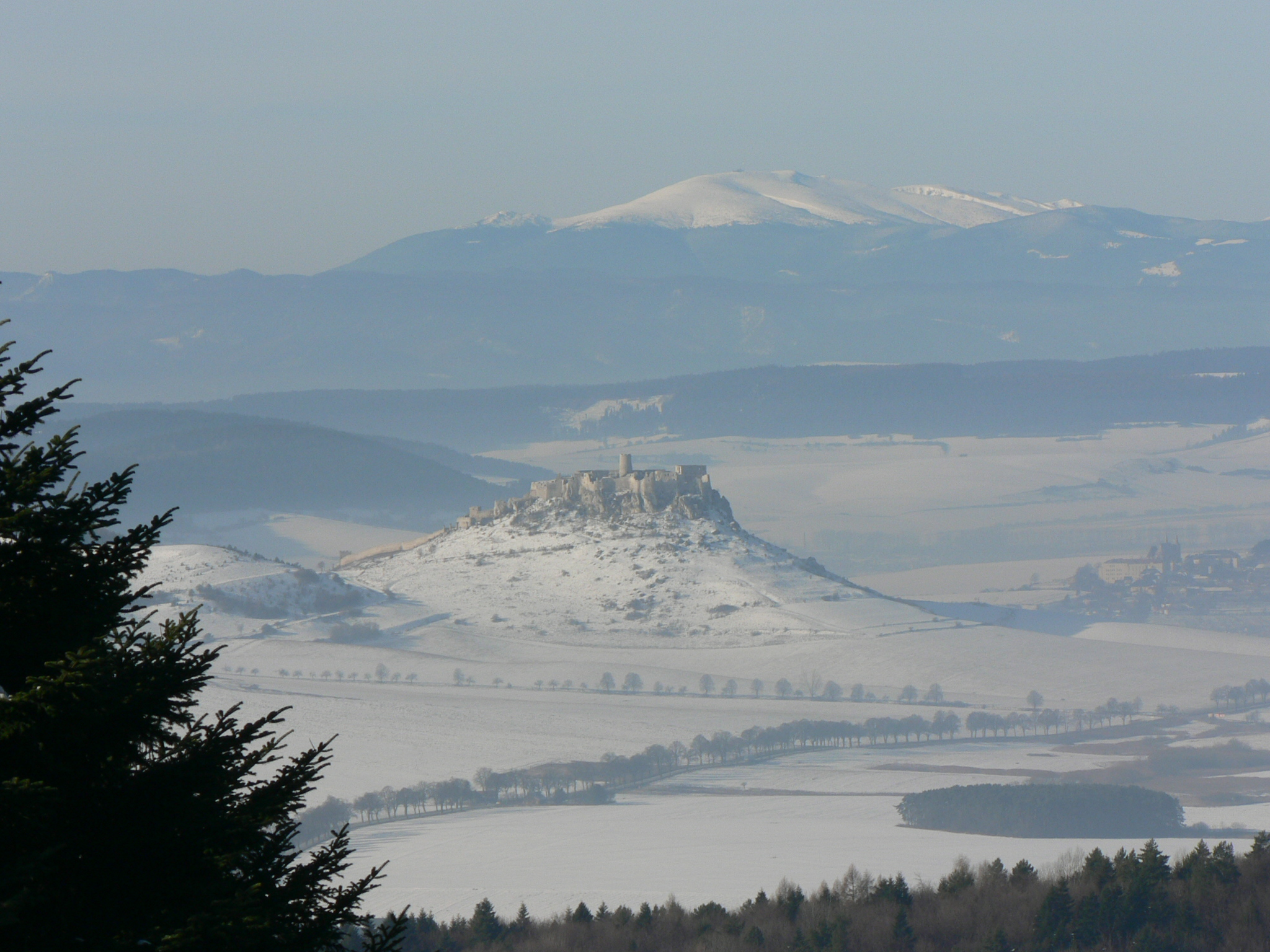
View of Spiš Castle, from the Branisko-pass

Branisko (or Branyiszko) is a mountain range in eastern Slovakia, between the Spiš and Šariš regions. It is a 20 km long and 5 km wide mountain range in the north–south direction, belonging to the Fatra-Tatra Area of the Inner Western Carpathians.

The mountain range is divided into two massifs: the larger Smrekovica with the highest hill Smrekovica (1200 m) and the lower one, the Sľubica, with the highest elevation point Sľubica (1129,4 m).
