= Levoča Mountains =

Coordinates: 49°10′N 20°35′E

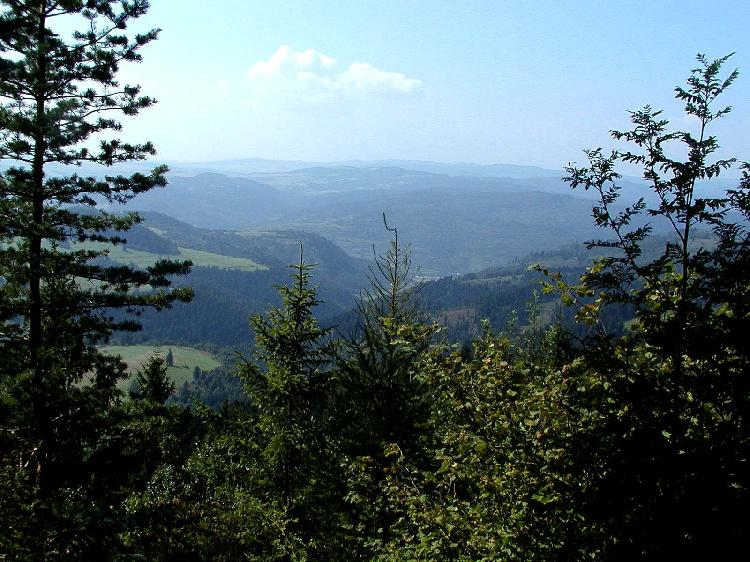
the Levoča Mountains

The Levoča Mountains (Slovak: Levočské vrchy, Hungarian: Lőcsei-hegység, German: Leutschauer Gebirge) is a mountain range in the Prešov Region of northern Slovakia. Geologically the range stands within the Podhale-Magura Area of the Outer Western Carpathians.

The highest point is Čierna hora (Black Mountain), at 1,289 m. The peaks in the range stand between 1000 and 1200 m, and the Levoča Mountains lie in the rain shadow of the Tatras, which causes less rainfall.

In 1953, 316 square km of the range was reserved for the Javorina military training area. The base was officially decommissioned on 31 December 2005, and the land returned to private use in January 2011.

One of the adjacent resort towns is Poprad.
