= Zliechov =

- Municipality
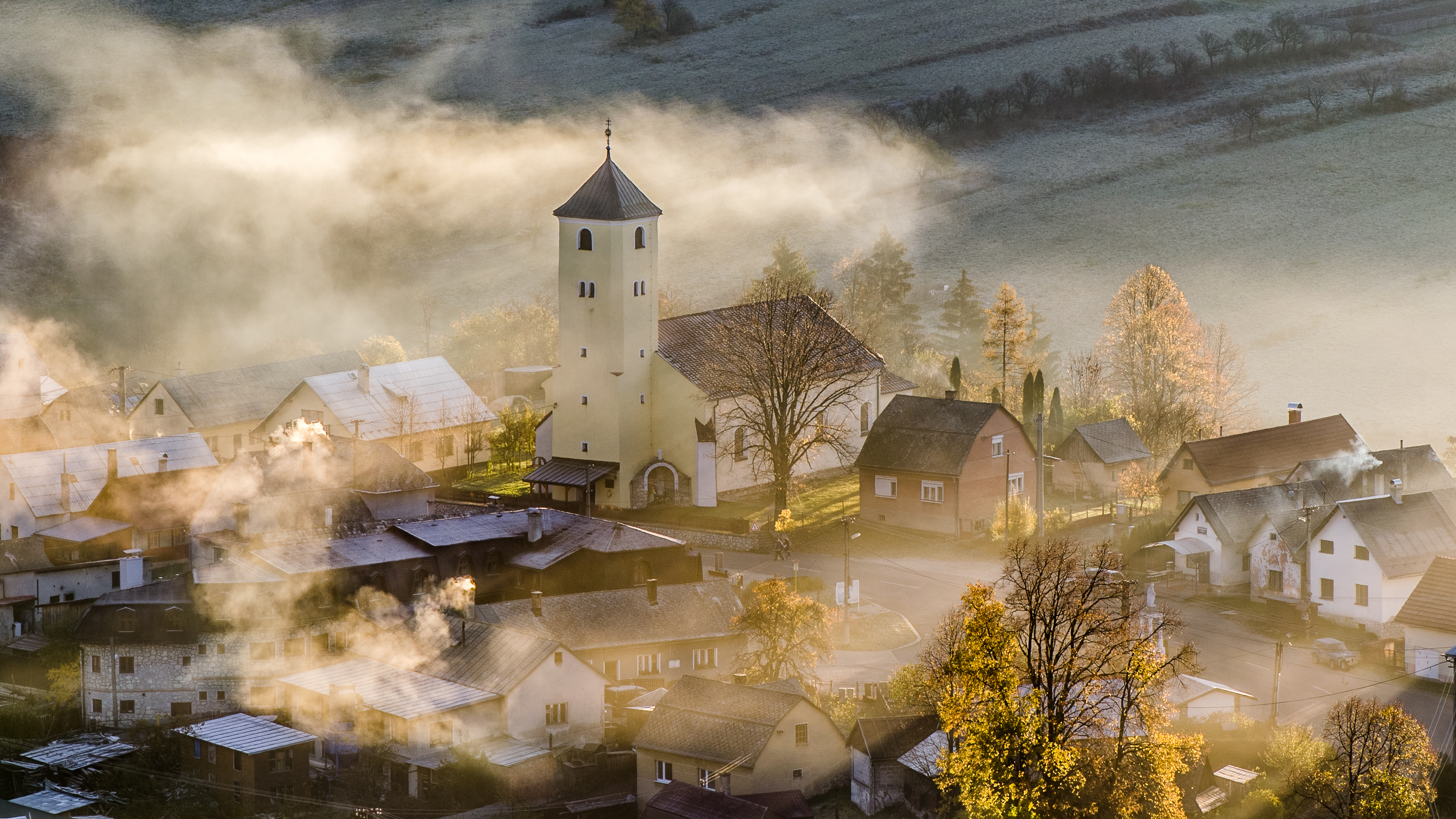
- Church of St Lawrence in Zliechov

- Flag

- Location of Zliechov in the Trenčín Region Location of Zliechov in Slovakia
- Coordinates: 48.95°N 18.43°E
- Country: Slovakia
- Region: Trenčín Region
- District: Ilava District
- First mentioned: 1272

Area
  - Total: 54.37 km^{2} (20.99 sq mi)
- Elevation: 562 m (1,844 ft)

Population (2025)
  - Total: 556
- Time zone: UTC+1 (CET)
  - Summer (DST): UTC+2 (CEST)
- Postal code: 183 2
- Area code: +421 42
- Vehicle registration plate (until 2022): IL
- Website: zliechov.sk

Zliechov (Slovak pronunciation: [ˈzlɪexɔw]; Hungarian: Zsolt, until 1899 Zljechó) is a village and municipality in Ilava District in the Trenčín Region of north-western Slovakia. It has a population of 607.

== History ==
In historical records the village was first mentioned in 1272.

== Geography ==
The municipality lies at an altitude of 562 metres (1,844 ft) and covers an area of 54.37 km^{2} (20.99 sq mi) (2025).

The village is located within the Strážov Mountains Protected Landscape Area and close to Strážov Mountain (1,213 m).

== Population ==
Population statistic (10 years)
Year	1995	2005	2015	2025
Count	721	607	601	556
Difference		−15.81%	−0.98%	−7.48%

Population statistic
Year	2024	2025
Count	560	556
Difference		−0.71%

It has a population of 556 people (31 December 2025).

=== Ethnicity ===
Census 2021 (1+ %)
Ethnicity	Number	Fraction
Slovak	562	96.89%
Not found out	17	2.93%
Total	580	

In year 2021 was 580 people by ethnicity 562 as Slovak, 17 as Not found out, 2 as Czech and 1 as German.

Note on population: The difference values of population numbers in the table "Population statistic" and in the sections "Ethnicity" & "Religion" is caused by the use of various statistical methods.

=== Religion ===
Census 2021 (1+ %)
Religion	Number	Fraction
Roman Catholic Church	503	86.72%
None	55	9.48%
Not found out	18	3.1%
Total	580	

In year 2021 was 580 people by religion 503 from Roman Catholic Church, 55 from None, 18 from Not found out, 1 from Greek Catholic Church, 1 from United Methodist Church, 1 from Buddhism and 1 from Ad hoc movements.

== See also ==
- Gapel, formerly part of Zliechov
