= Gapel =

Coordinates: 48°55′N 18°29′E

- Village
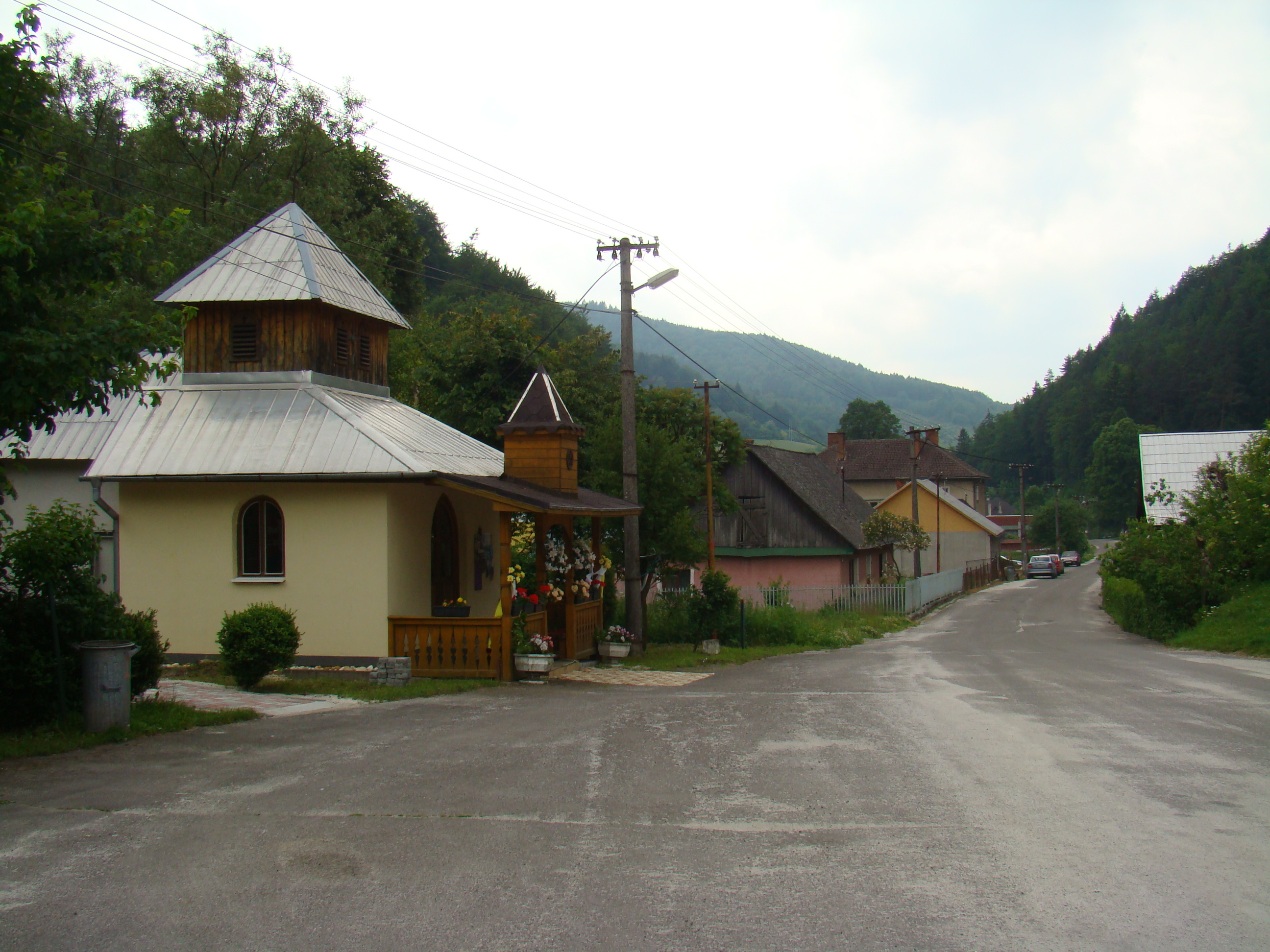
- The main street of Gapel.
- Interactive map of Gapel
- Country: Slovakia
- Municipality: Valaská Belá (formerly Zliechov)
- District: Prievidza District
- Time zone: UTC+1 (CET)

Gapel (in German: Gabel) is a small village in Slovakia which was founded in the 18th century. Since 1960 it has been a part of Valaska Bela district. Before this, it was a part of Zliechov district.

In the past, Gapel was famous for its glass industry. However, in the 1950s, the glass industry was moved to Valaska Bela. It is because of this fact that these days the village is a favourite for cottagers who spend weekends and holidays there.

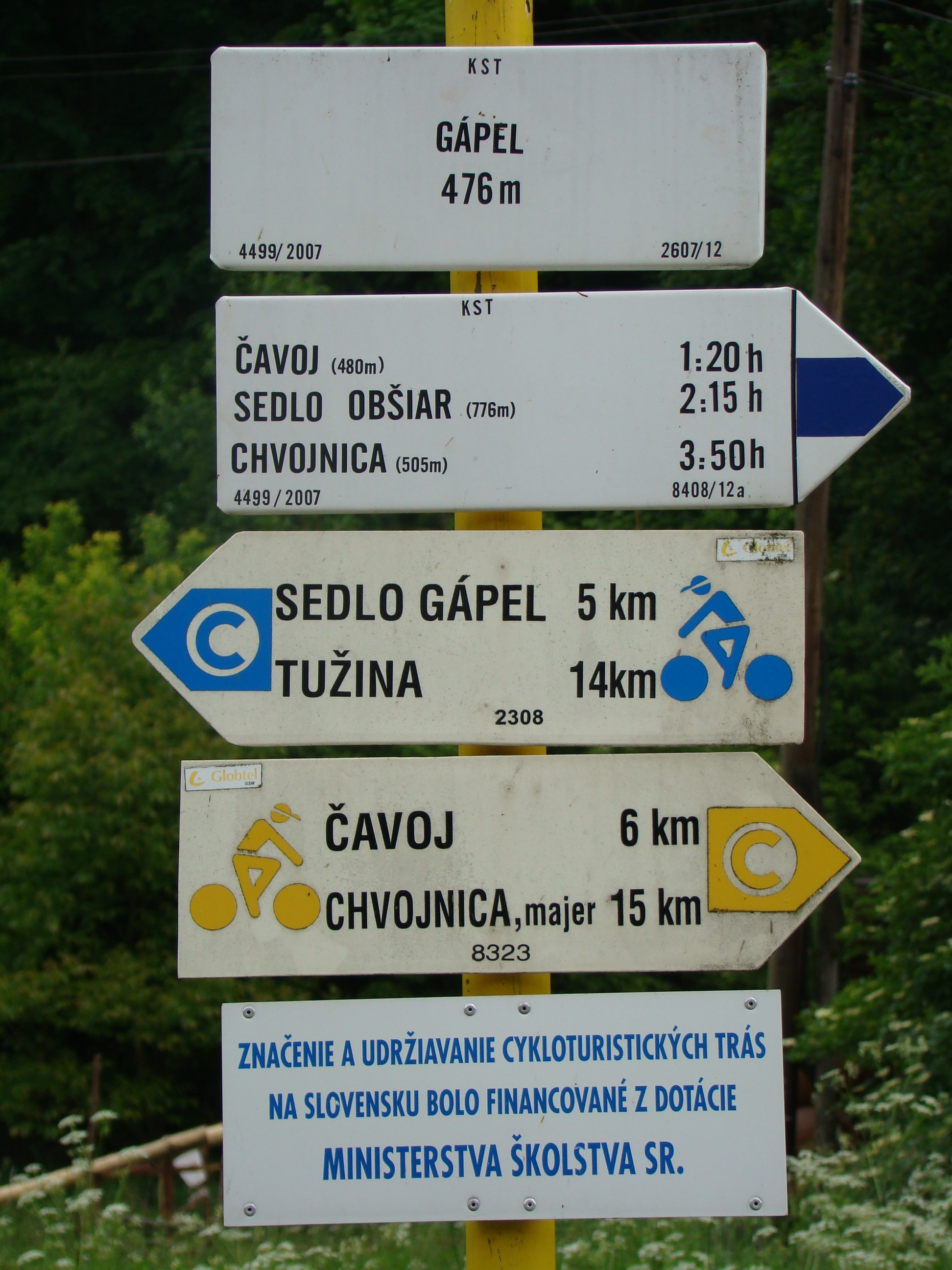
Direction signs

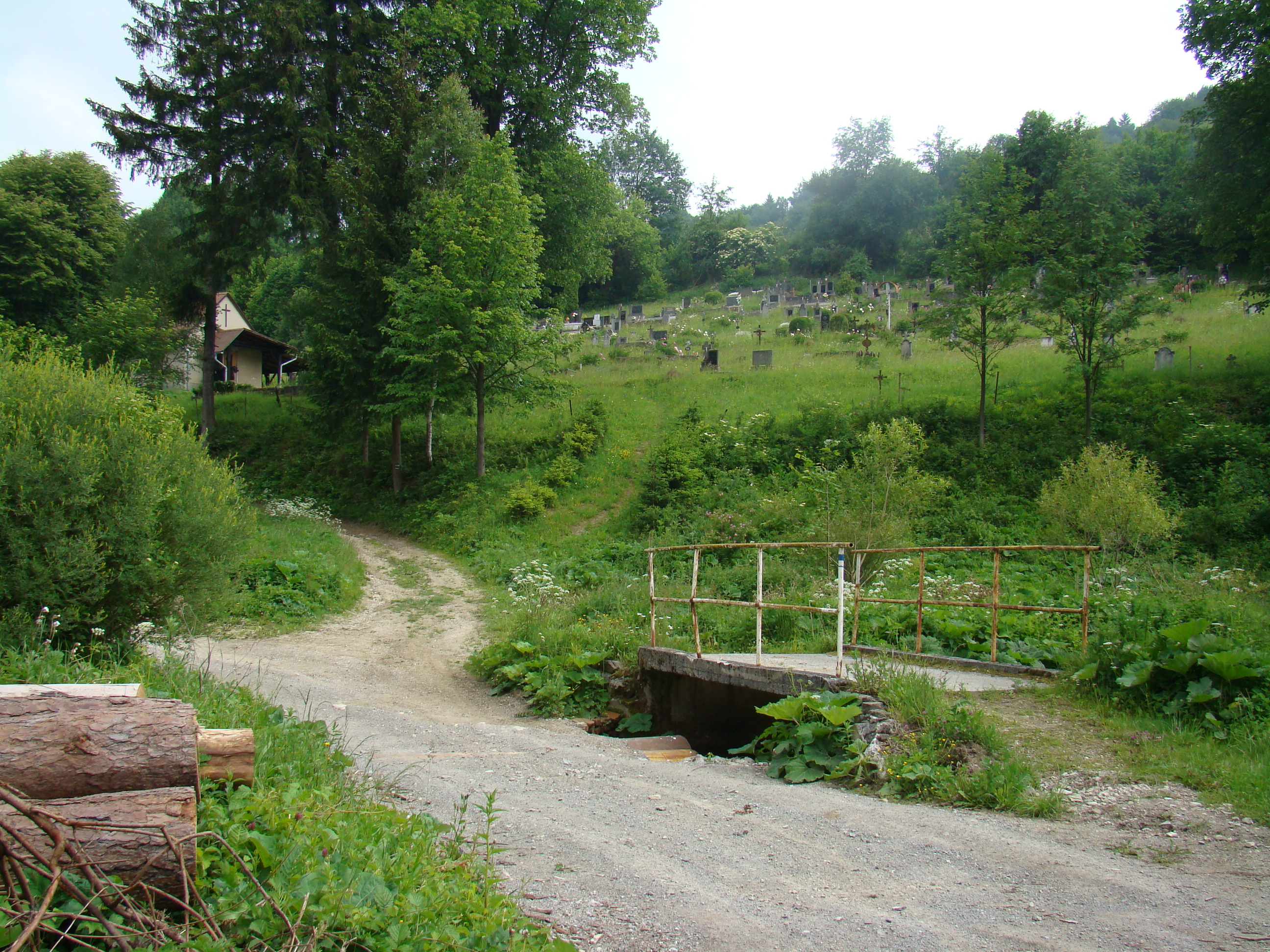
Cemetery in Gapel

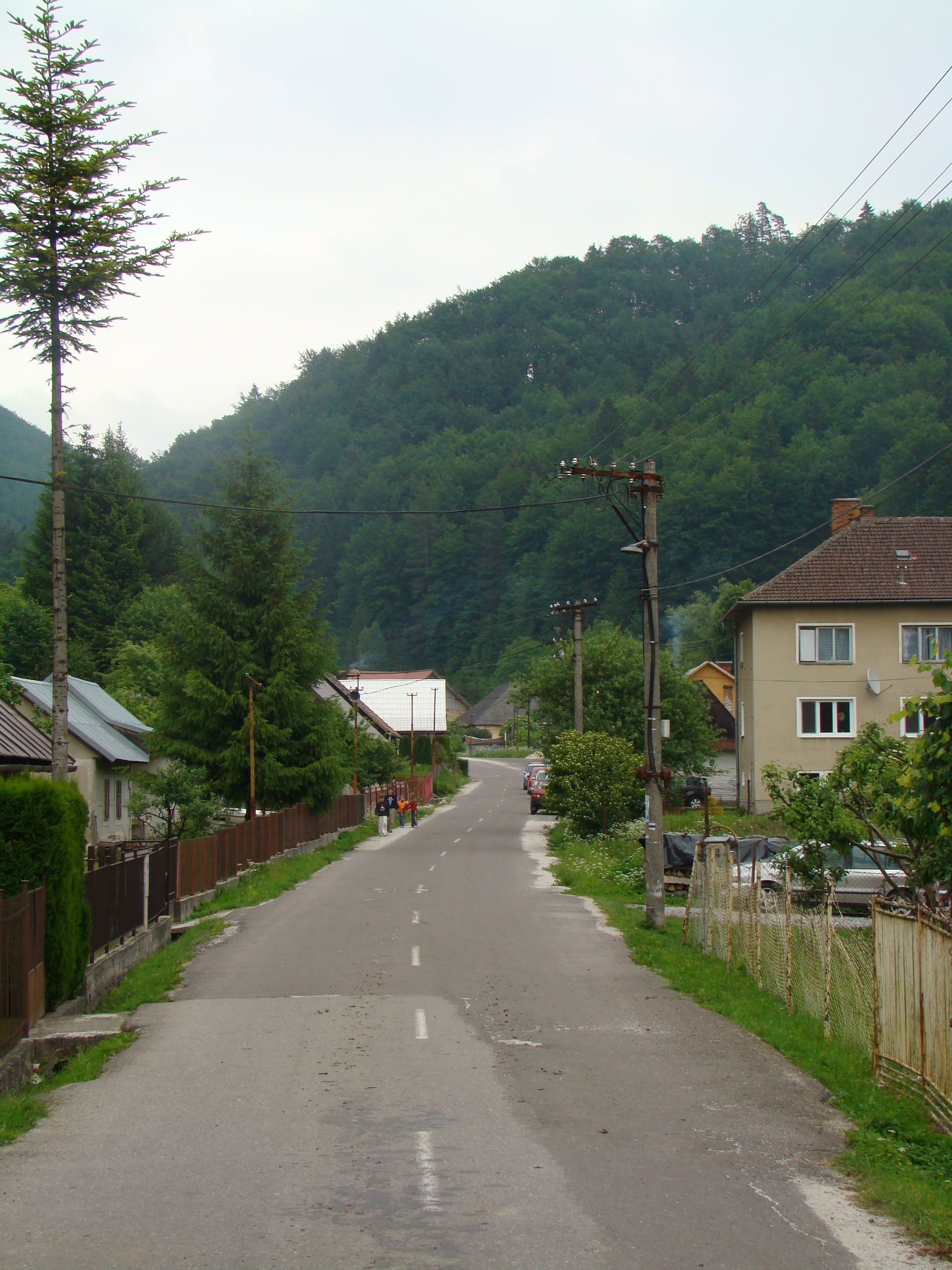
The main street in Gapel

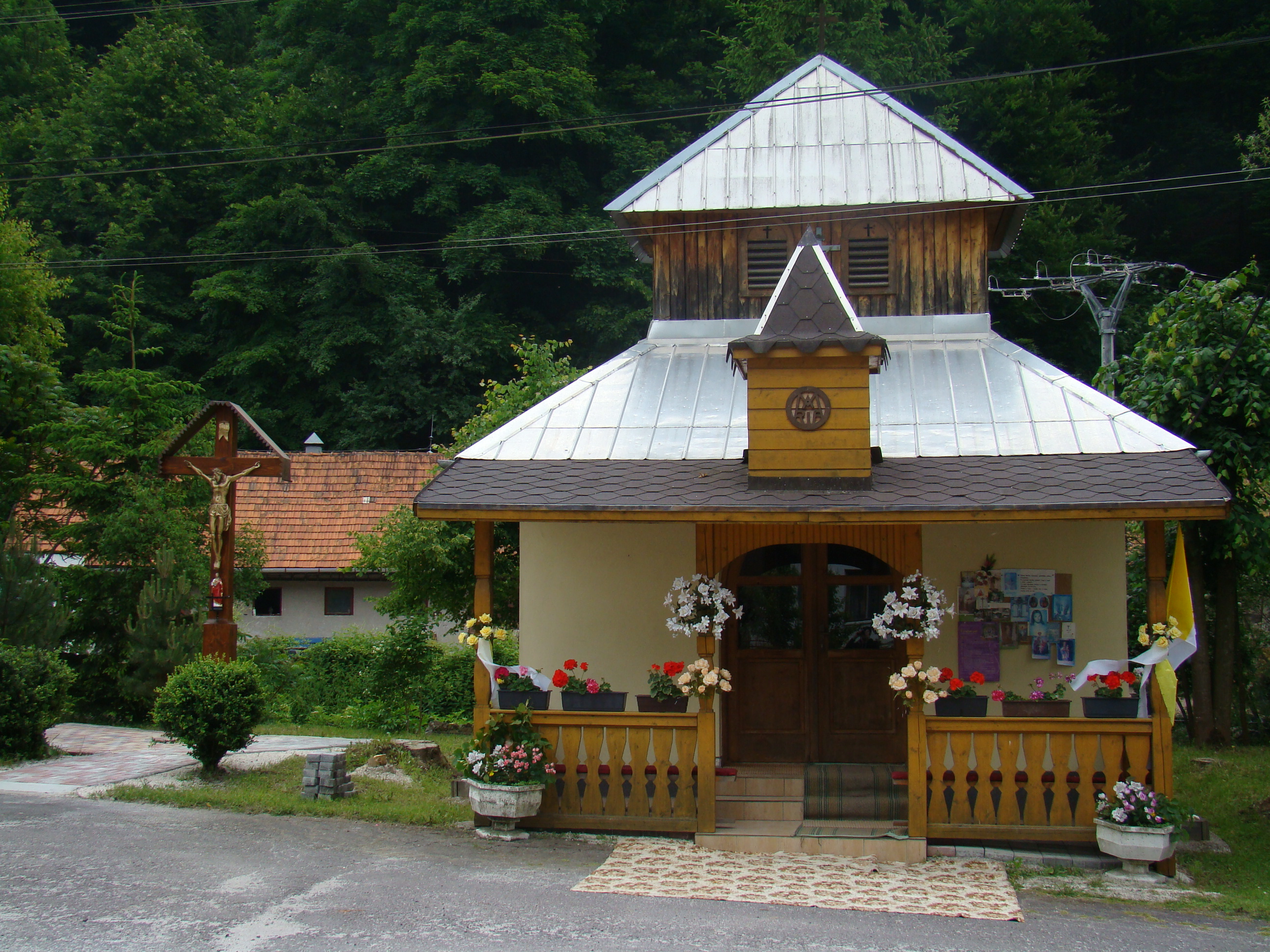
The small church in Gapel
