= Strážov Mountains =

Mountain range in Slovakia

Coordinates: 48°55′N 18°30′E

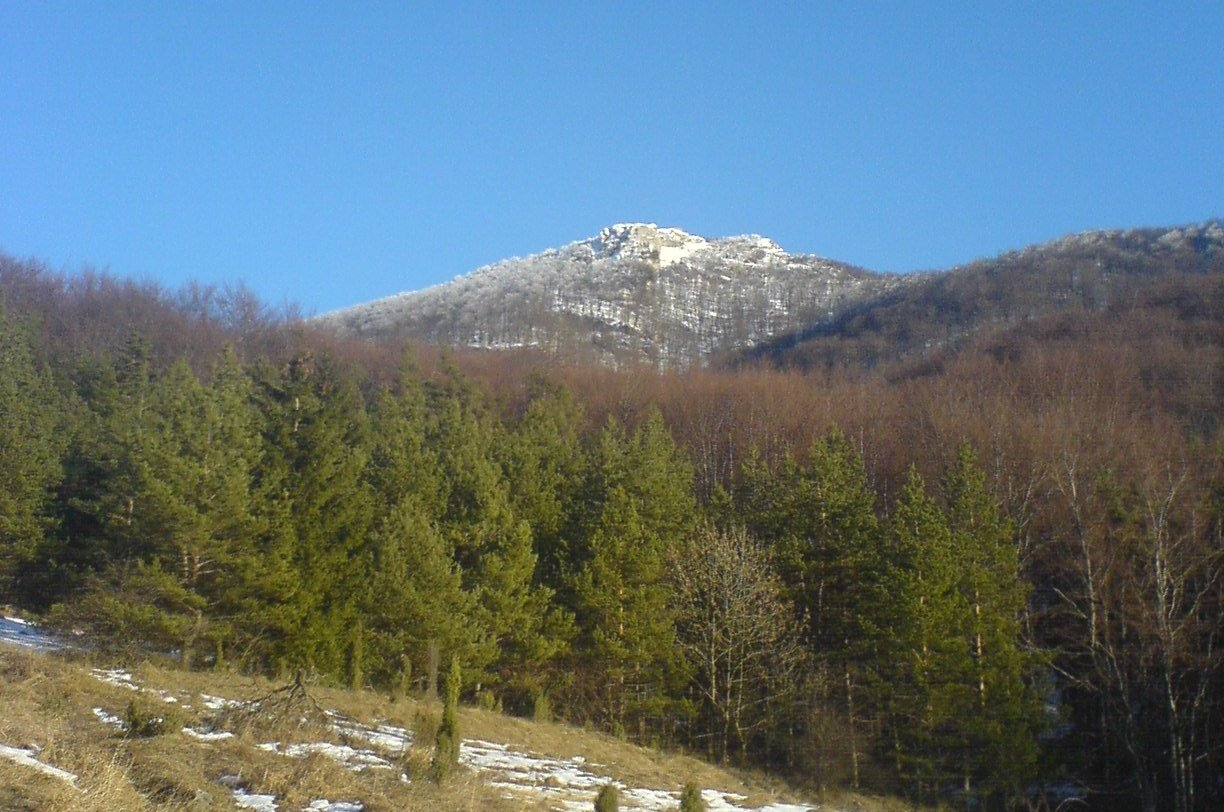
- View of Strážov from Zliechov.

Highest point
- Peak: Strážov
- Elevation: 1,213 m (3,980 ft)

Geography
- Strážovské vrchy Mts. in the geomorphologic division of the Western Carpathians
- Country: Slovakia
- Parent range: Western Carpathians

Geology
- Orogeny: Alpine orogeny

The Strážov Mountains (Slovak: Strážovské vrchy, pronounced [ˈstraːʐɔwske ˈʋr̩xi]) are a mountain range in northwestern Slovakia, being part of Inner Western Carpathians, and of the Fatra-Tatra Area. They are situated between the towns of Trenčín, Považská Bystrica, Rajec, Prievidza and Bánovce nad Bebravou, bordering White Carpathians and the Váh river in the northwest and west, Javorníky in the north, Malá Fatra in the east, Vtáčnik and Nitra river in the south and Považský Inovec in the southwest. The highest mountain is Strážov (1,213 m AMSL)

The Strážov Mountains and Súľov Mountains are protected by the Strážov Mountains Protected Landscape Area since 1989. The Súľov Rocks in the northwest have been designated as a nature reserve.

Many thermal springs can be found here, inspiring the establishment of many spa centres in the region, for example Trenčianske Teplice or Rajecké Teplice.

== Geomorphology ==
According to geomorphological division, the mountain range is divided into:

- Zliechovská hornatina
- Nitrické vrchy
- Trenčianska vrchovina
- Malá Magura

== Geology ==
The Strážovské vrchy Mts. are one of the largest mountain ranges in the Fatra-Tatra Area of Slovakia. Whole mountain range is a Miocene horst that modifies older Mesozoic nappe structure. Oldest rock form the crystalline core which is eccentrically situated at the southern periphery of the mountain range in two massifs denoted the Suchý and the Malá Magura massifs. Massifs are composed of migmatites, gneisses, amphibolites and granitoid rocks. Crystalline core is overlapped by the Triassic to Lower Cretaceous (Albian) deposits. Two largescale nappe units are overlying the basement and its sedimentary cover. The lower Fatric Unit composed of Lower Triassic to Cenomanian sediments of two types, the Zliechov succession, distinguished by deep marine Jurassic facies and the Belá succession with the shallow marine facies deposited in the same time. Uppermost nappe unit of the nappe structure is called the Hronic unit, with the Carboniferous-Permian extensive volcanosedimentary succession (Ipoltica Group) and Triassic, less often Jurassic-Lower Cretaceous limestones and dolomites (the Čierny Váh, Biely Váh and Bebrava successions). In the NW portion of the mountain range the boundary with the Pieniny Klippen Belt consists of the Manin unit that is probably a frontal element of Fatric unit incorporated into Klippen Belt strike-slip zone.
