= Strážov =

Strážov may refer to:

- Strážov (Klatovy District), a town in the Czech Republic
- Strážov (Slovakia), a hill in Karpaty
