= Jaroslav Baška =

Slovak politician

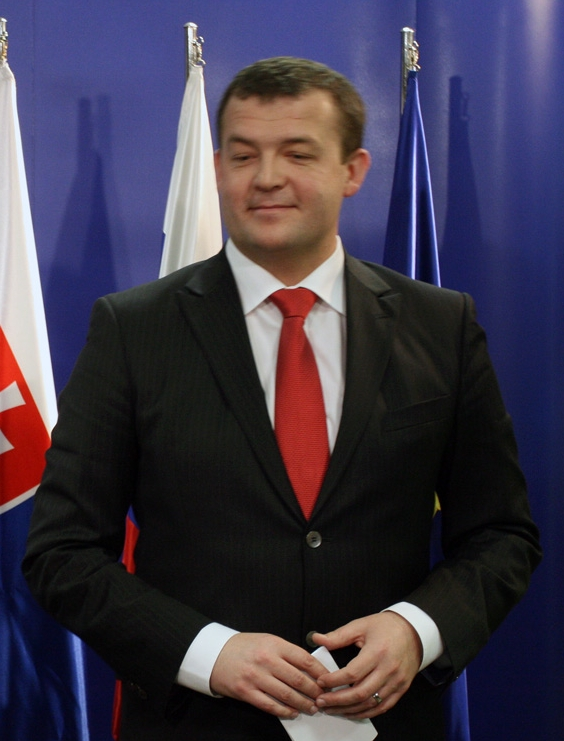

Member of the National Council
- In office 15 October 2002 – 4 July 2006
- Incumbent
- Assumed office 8 July 2010

Minister of Defence of Slovakia
- In office 30 January 2008 – 8 July 2010

Personal details
- Born: 5 April 1975 (age 51) Považská Bystrica, Czechoslovakia (now Slovakia)
- Party: Direction – Slovak Social Democracy
- Education: University of Žilina

Jaroslav Baška (born 5 April 1975 in Považská Bystrica) is a Slovak politician. Baška has served as a member of the National Council in the Direction – Slovak Social Democracy caucus since 2002. In addition, he has been the governor of Trenčín Region since 2013. In 2008–2010, he served as the Minister of Defence.

== Early life ==
Baška studied electrical engineering at the University of Žilina graduating in 1998. Following the graduation until his entry to politics, he worked at the tire manufacturer Matador.

== Political career ==
=== National politics ===
Baška was first elected to parliament in 2002 and is still a member. Between 2006 and 2010, he was a member of the government, first as a State Secretary at the Ministry of Defense and since 2008 as the Minister of Defense.

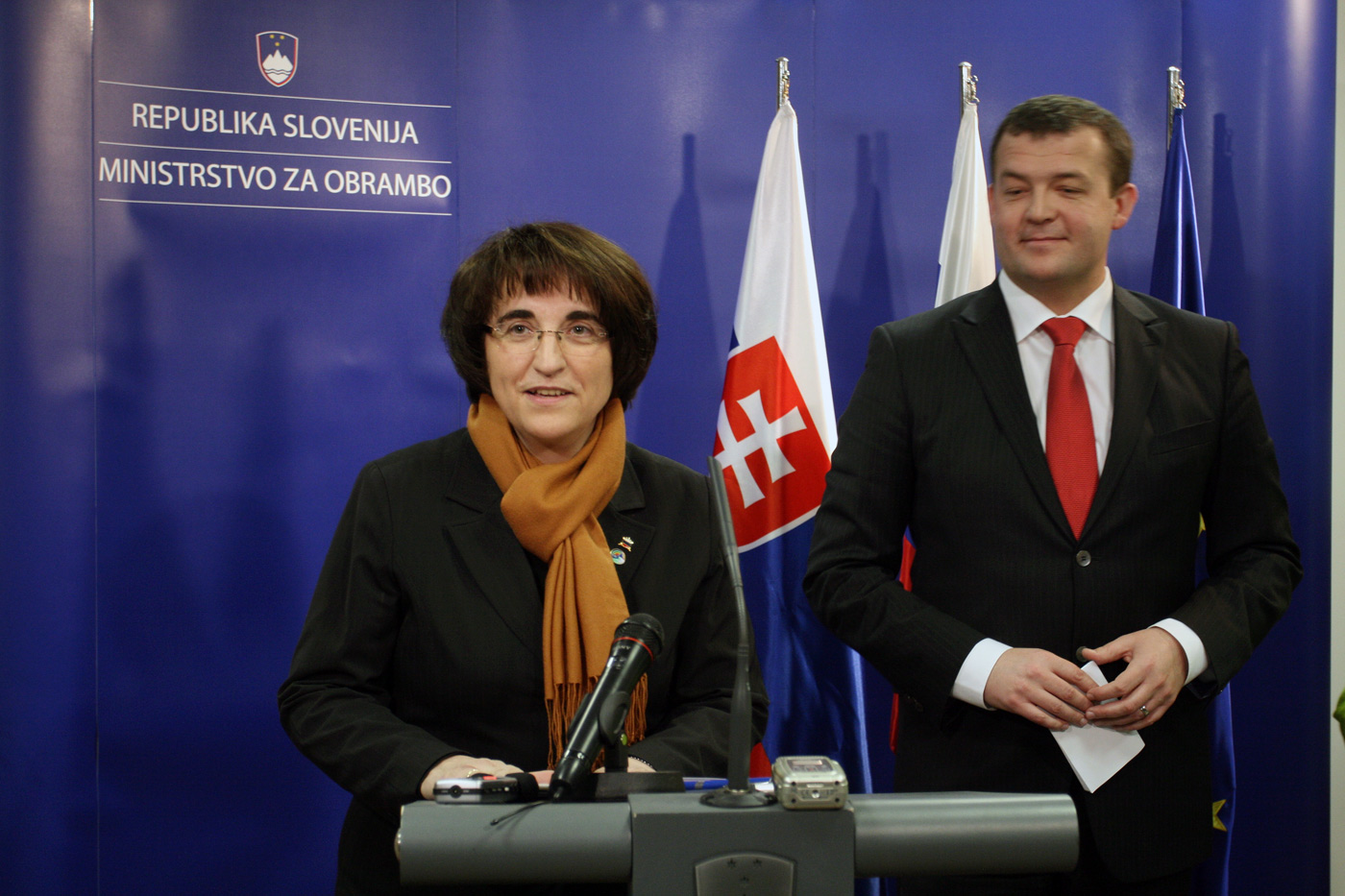
Baška as the Defense minister, meeting his Slovenian counterpart Ljubica Jelušič.

=== Local and regional politics ===
In 2003–2006, Baška served as a mayor of the Dohňany village. Since 2013, he has served as the governor of the Trenčín region.

== Personal life ==
Baška is married and has three children. He enjoys cycling and often campaigns on his bicycle before elections.
