= Valaská Belá =

Village and municipality in western Slovakia

- Municipality
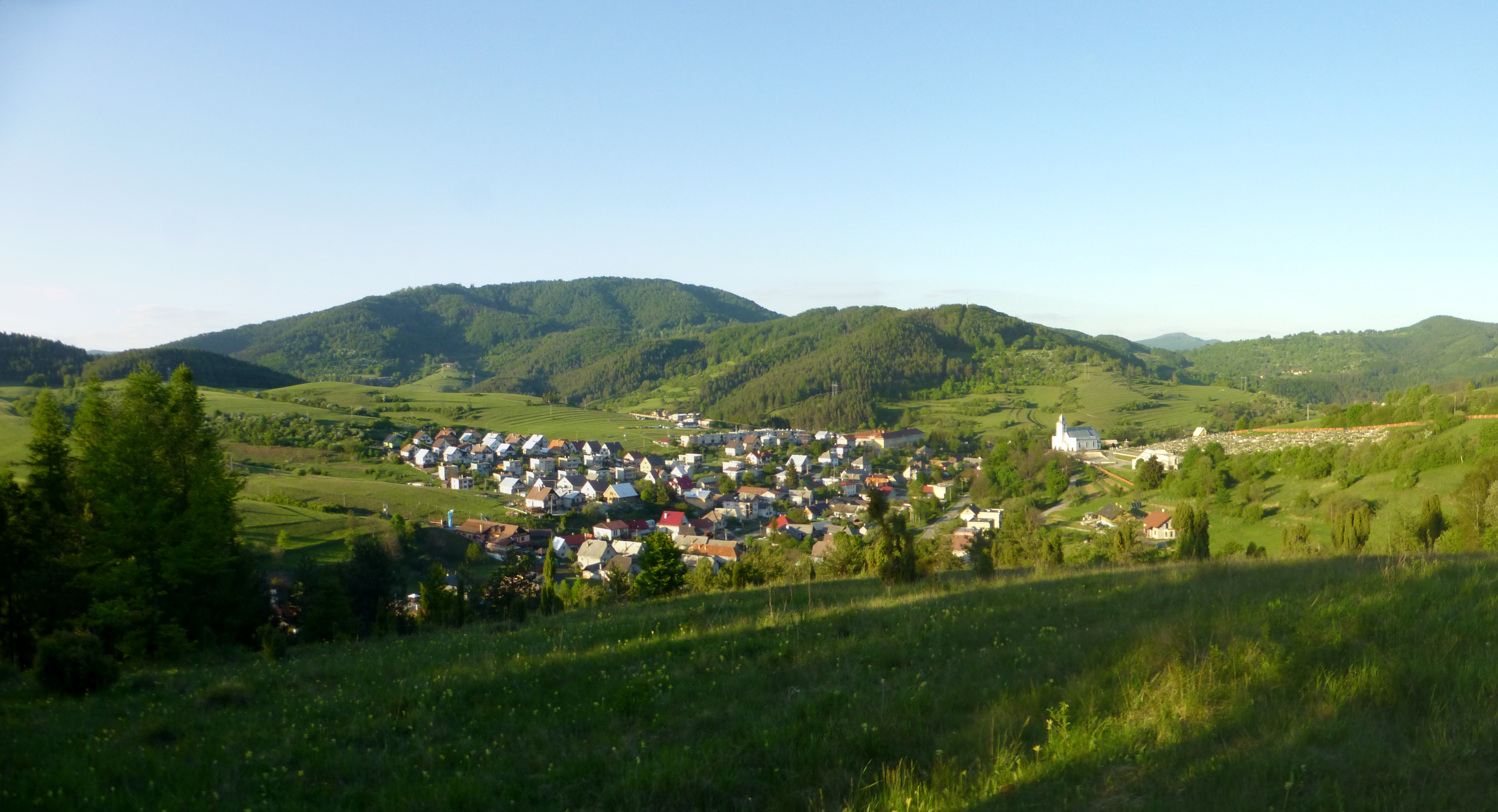

- Flag

- Location of Valaská Belá in the Trenčín Region Location of Valaská Belá in Slovakia
- Coordinates: 48.88°N 18.40°E
- Country: Slovakia
- Region: Trenčín Region
- District: Prievidza District
- First mentioned: 1324

Area
  - Total: 64.73 km^{2} (24.99 sq mi)
- Elevation: 485 m (1,591 ft)

Population (2025)
  - Total: 1,870
- Time zone: UTC+1 (CET)
  - Summer (DST): UTC+2 (CEST)
- Postal code: 972 28
- Area code: +421 46
- Vehicle registration plate (until 2022): PD
- Website: valaskabela.sk

Valaská Belá (Hungarian: Bélapataka) is a village and municipality in Prievidza District in the Trenčín Region of western Slovakia.

== History ==
In historical records, the village was first mentioned in 1324.

== Geography ==
The municipality lies at an altitude of 485 metres (1,591 ft) and covers an area of 64.73 km^{2} (24.99 sq mi) (2025).

== Population ==
Population statistic (10 years)
Year	1995	2005	2015	2025
Count	2577	2317	2166	1870
Difference		−10.08%	−6.51%	−13.66%

Population statistic
Year	2024	2025
Count	1905	1870
Difference		−1.83%

It has a population of 1870 people (31 December 2025).

=== Ethnicity ===
Census 2021 (1+ %)
Ethnicity	Number	Fraction
Slovak	1902	95.38%
Not found out	91	4.56%
Total	1994	

In year 2021 was 1994 people by ethnicity 1902 as Slovak, 91 as Not found out, 19 as Czech, 6 as Russian, 3 as Ukrainian, 3 as Other, 2 as Hungarian, 1 as Vietnamese, 1 as Romani, 1 as Rusyn, 1 as Polish and 1 as English.

Note on population: The difference values of population numbers in the table "Population statistic" and in the sections "Ethnicity" & "Religion" is caused by the use of various statistical methods.

=== Religion ===
Census 2021 (1+ %)
Religion	Number	Fraction
Roman Catholic Church	1587	79.59%
None	275	13.79%
Not found out	84	4.21%
Total	1994	

In year 2021 was 1994 people by religion 1587 from Roman Catholic Church, 275 from None, 84 from Not found out, 8 from Eastern Orthodox Church, 8 from Evangelical Church, 7 from Other and not ascertained christian church, 6 from Greek Catholic Church, 5 from Paganism and natural spirituality, 5 from Islam, 2 from Jehovah's Witnesses, 2 from Christian Congregations in Slovakia, 1 from Calvinist Church, 1 from United Methodist Church, 1 from Buddhism, 1 from Bahá'i Community and 1 from Ad hoc movements.

== Religion ==
Churches in the village include the wooden Saint Michal church. Local priest Juraj Gábor built the first single-aisle brick church in 1737. At the end of the 18th century, the parishioners built the brick chapel. The present church is from the year 1800. Primarily it was a longitudinal single-aisle church with one tower ornamented with prissian paintings. In 1929, two aisles were added, ornamented similarly to the main aisle. In 1944, the interior was painted by Štefan Enhoff.
