= Strážov (Slovakia) =

Mountain in Slovakia

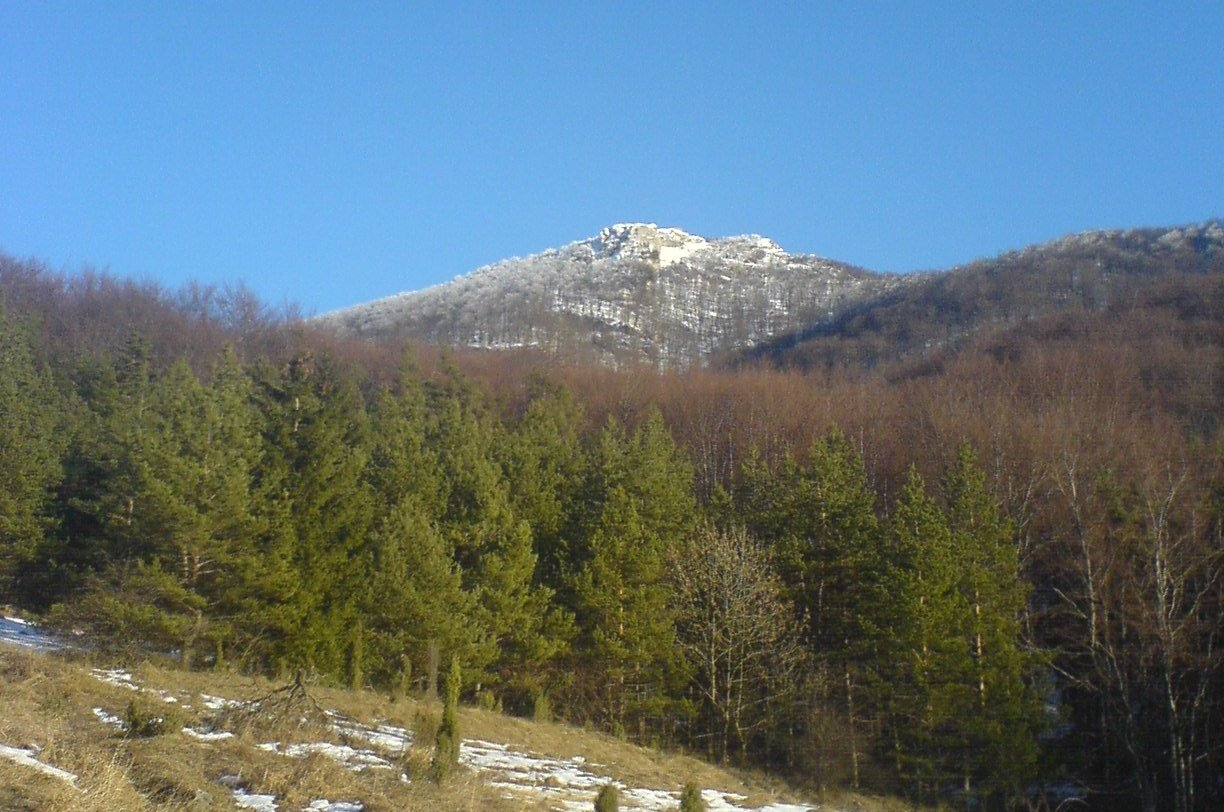
- Strážov viewed from the village of Zliechov

Highest point
- Elevation: 1,213 m (3,980 ft)
- Coordinates: 48°57′11″N 18°27′21″E

Geography
- Location within Slovakia
- Location: Trenčín Region, Žilina Region; Slovakia
- Parent range: Strážov Mountains

Strážov (pronounced [ˈstraːʐɔw]), at 1,213 m (3,980 ft), is the highest mountain in the Strážov Mountains, part of the Inner Western Carpathians, in Trenčín and Žilina Regions, Slovakia.

The mountain is protected by National Nature Reserve Strážov, which belongs to Strážov Mountains Protected Landscape Area. The National Nature Reserve was declared in 1981 and covers an area of 4.8 km² (1.85 mi²).

The nearest villages are Zliechov and Čičmany.
