= Trenčín Region =

Region of Slovakia

Trenčín Region Trenčiansky kraj
- Region
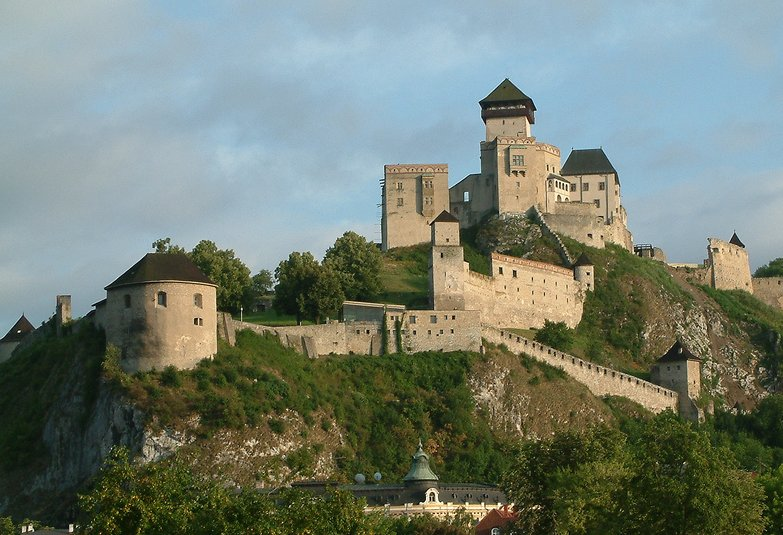

- Flag Coat of arms

- Country: Slovakia
- Capital: Trenčín

Government
  - Body: County Council of Trenčín Region
  - Governor: Jaroslav Baška (SMER–SD)

Area
  - Total: 4,501.81 km^{2} (1,738.16 sq mi)
- Highest elevation: 1,346 m (4,416 ft)
- Lowest elevation: 195 m (640 ft)

Population (2025)
  - Total: 562,536

GDP
  - Total: €7.546 billion (2016)
  - Per capita: €12,803 (2016)
- Time zone: UTC+1 (CET)
  - Summer (DST): UTC+2 (CEST)
- ISO 3166 code: SK-TC
- Website: www.tsk.sk

The Trenčín Region (Slovak: Trenčiansky kraj, pronounced [ˈtrentʂɪɐnski ˈkraj]; Czech: Trenčínský kraj; Hungarian: Trencséni kerület) is one of the eight Slovak administrative regions. It consists of nine districts (okresy). The region was established in 1996: previously it had been a part of the West Slovak Region (Západoslovenský kraj) and partly the Central Slovak Region (Stredoslovenský kraj). Industry is a major sector of the region's economy.

== Geography ==
It is located in north-western Slovakia, has an area of 4501.81 km^{2}. The Danubian Lowland reaches the region to Nové Mesto nad Váhom and Partizánske areas. There are several mountain ranges in the region: a small part of the Little Carpathians in the south-west, White Carpathians in the north-west, Maple Mountains in the north, Strážov Mountains in the centre, Považský Inovec in the south, Vtáčnik in the south-east and Žiar in the east. Small parts of Lesser Fatra and of the Kremnica Mountains also stretch to the region. Major rivers are the Váh in the western part of the region, creating the so-called Váh Basin and Nitra in the south-east and east, creating the Upper Nitra Basin. The Myjava River springs in the west, but flows into the Trnava Region. The region borders Žilina Region in the north-east and east, Banská Bystrica Region in the south-east, Nitra Region in the south, Trnava Region in the south and south-west, Czech South Moravian Region in the west and the Zlín Region in the north-west and north.

== Population ==
Historical population
Year	Pop.	±%
1970	515,916	—
1980	568,498	+10.2%
1991	600,575	+5.6%
2001	605,582	+0.8%
2011	594,328	−1.9%
2021	577,464	−2.8%
Source: Censuses

Population statistic (10 years)
Year	1995	2005	2015	2025
Count	609,828	600,386	589,935	562,536
Difference		−1.54%	−1.74%	−4.64%

Population statistic
Year	2024	2025
Count	565,572	562,536
Difference		−0.53%

It has a population of 562,536 people (31 December 2025). The population density is 4,501.81/km^{2} (11,659.6/sq mi) (2025-06-30/-07-01), which is more than Slovak average (110 per km^{2}), and the second highest after the Bratislava Region. The largest towns are Trenčín, Prievidza, Považská Bystrica, Dubnica nad Váhom and Partizánske.

=== Ethnicity ===
Census 2021 (1+ %)
Ethnicity	Number	Fraction
Slovak	544,919	94.36%
Not found out	27,894	4.83%
Czech	6015	1.04%
Total	577,464	

In year 2021 was 577,464 people by ethnicity 544,919 as Slovak, 27,894 as Not found out, 6015 as Czech, 1792 as Other, 1156 as Hungarian, 1135 as Romani, 811 as German, 807 as Russian, 414 as Rusyn, 402 as Ukrainian, 374 as Polish, 344 as Moravian, 258 as Italian, 207 as English, 177 as Romanian, 164 as Serbian, 150 as Vietnamese, 114 as Bulgarian, 105 as Croatian, 104 as Jewish, 102 as Irish, 100 as Austrian, 79 as French, 75 as Canadian, 64 as Chinese, 64 as Greek, 43 as Albanian, 42 as Turkish, 26 as Silesian, 19 as Korean and 12 as Iranian.

Note on population: The difference values of population numbers in the table "Population statistic" and in the sections "Ethnicity" & "Religion" is caused by the use of various statistical methods.

=== Religion ===
Census 2021 (1+ %)
Religion	Number	Fraction
Roman Catholic Church	335,222	58.05%
None	152,586	26.42%
Evangelical Church	41,278	7.15%
Not found out	32,775	5.68%
Total	577,464	

In year 2021 was 577,464 people by religion 335,222 from Roman Catholic Church, 152,586 from None, 41,278 from Evangelical Church, 32,775 from Not found out, 2979 from Greek Catholic Church, 2095 from Ad hoc movements, 1943 from Christian Congregations in Slovakia, 1748 from Other, 1043 from Other and not ascertained christian church, 967 from Jehovah's Witnesses, 817 from Eastern Orthodox Church, 778 from Buddhism, 540 from Apostolic Church, 539 from Calvinist Church, 518 from Paganism and natural spirituality, 357 from Islam, 348 from Seventh-day Adventist Church, 236 from United Methodist Church, 159 from Church of the Brethren, 127 from Old Catholic Church, 126 from Hinduism, 95 from Jewish community, 61 from Baptists Church, 54 from Czechoslovak Hussite Church, 36 from Church of Jesus Christ of Latter-day Saints, 30 from Bahá'i Community and 7 from New Apostolic Church.

== Politics ==
Current governor of Trenčín region is Jaroslav Baška (Smer-SD). He won with 67.25 %. In election 2022 was elected also regional parliament :

Regional Council of Trenčín region

Type
- Type: Unicameral
- Houses: Regional Council

Leadership
- Governor: Jaroslav Baška, Direction

Structure
- Seats: 44
- Political groups: Independent group (19) National group (19) Centre-right group (5) Non-affiliated (1)

Elections
- Last election: 29 October 2022

Meeting place
- Governor's office, Trenčín

Website
- Council of Trenčín region

=== 2017 elections ===
Political party	Seats won	Percentage
Independents	22 / 47	46.8 %
Coalition led by Smer-SD	16 / 47	34.0 %
Centre-right coalition	9 / 47	19.2 %

== Administrative division ==
The Trenčín Region consists of 9 districts: Bánovce nad Bebravou, Ilava, Myjava, Nové Mesto nad Váhom, Partizánske, Považská Bystrica, Prievidza, Púchov, and Trenčín.

There are 275 municipalities (obce), including 18 towns, where about 58% of the region's population live.

District	Area [km^{2}]	Population
Bánovce nad Bebravou	461.94	34,714
Ilava	358.50	56,166
Myjava	327.42	24,551
Nové Mesto nad Váhom	579.98	61,105
Partizánske	301.01	42,755
Považská Bystrica	463.15	60,099
Prievidza	959.86	126,771
Púchov	375.10	43,318
Trenčín	674.81	113,057

Population and area values are current for year 2025.

== Sport ==
Slovak bandy has its base in the region. Trenčianske Teplice is the seat of Slovak Bandy Association and rink bandy sessions have been organised in for example Púchov and Nové Mesto nad Váhom.

== Places of interest ==
- Trenčín with Trenčín Castle, City Gate, Trenčín Synagogue, Roman inscription on the castle rock in Trenčín, etc.
- The Tomb of Milan Rastislav Štefánik on the Bradlo above Brezová pod Bradlom
- Beckov Castle
- Trenčianske Teplice - a historical spa town
- Skalka pri Trenčíne monastery
- Castles in Šimonovany, Brodzany and Veľké Uherce
- Bojnice with Bojnice Castle, Bojnice Zoo, etc.
- Lednica Castle
- Manínska Gorge
- Little Carpathians Protected Landscape Area
- White Carpathians Protected Landscape Area
- Ponitrie Protected Landscape Area
- Strážov Mountains Protected Landscape Area

== Gallery ==
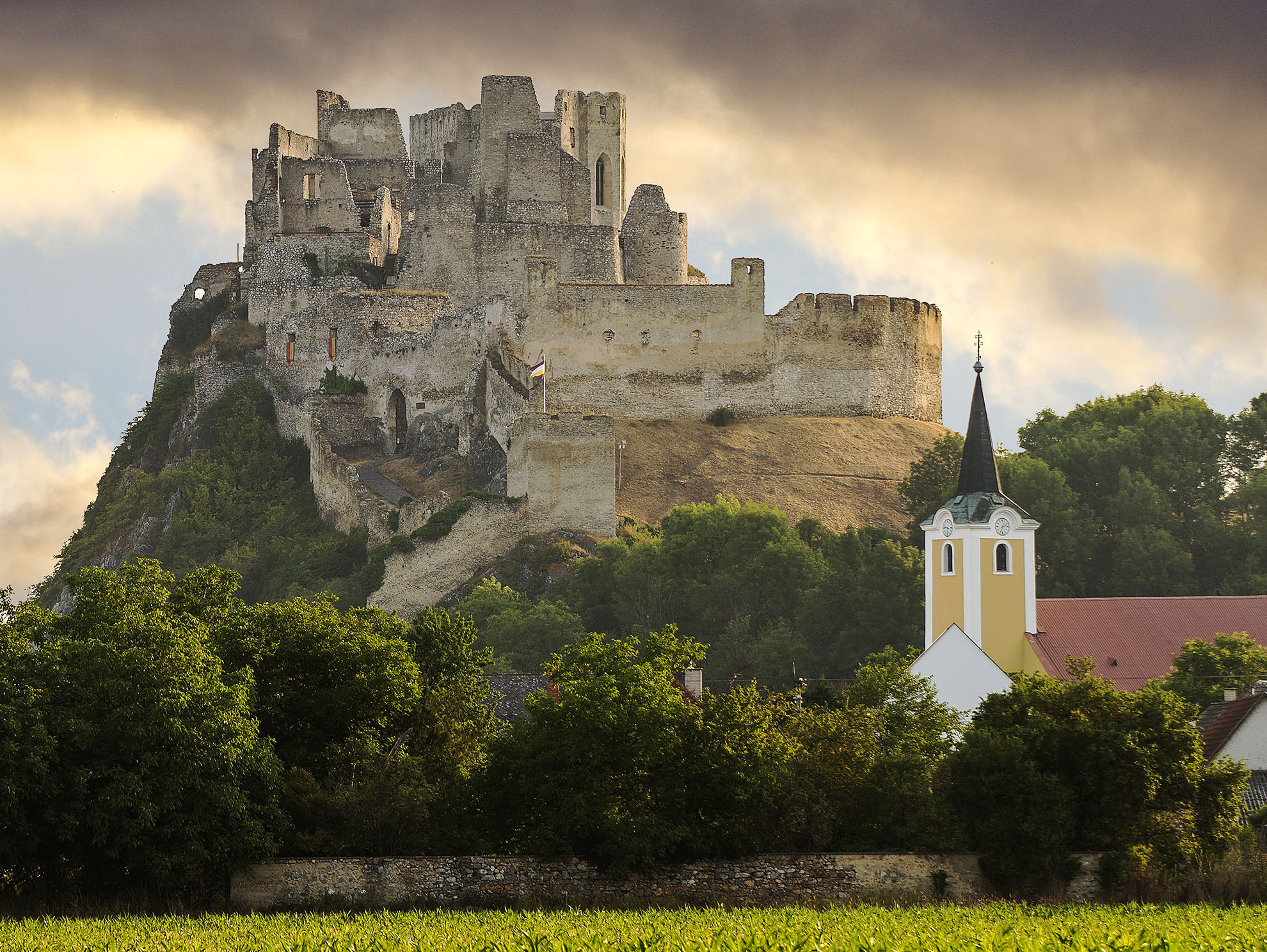
Beckov Castle

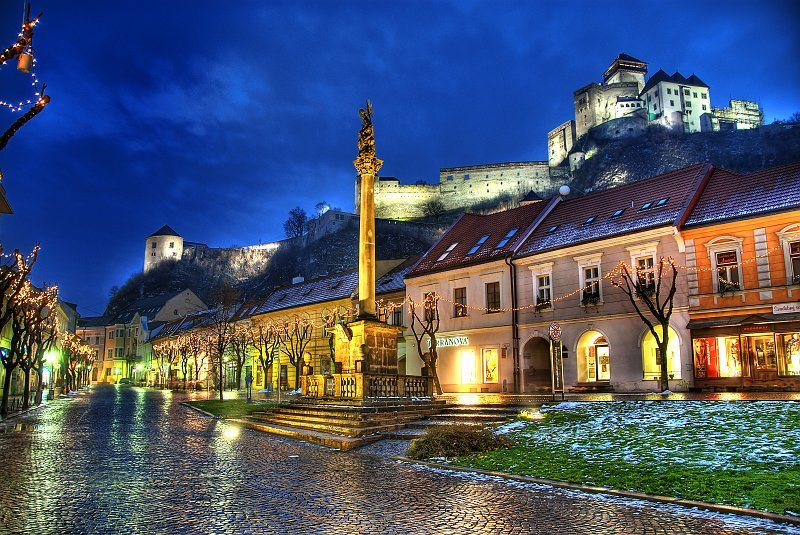
Trenčín

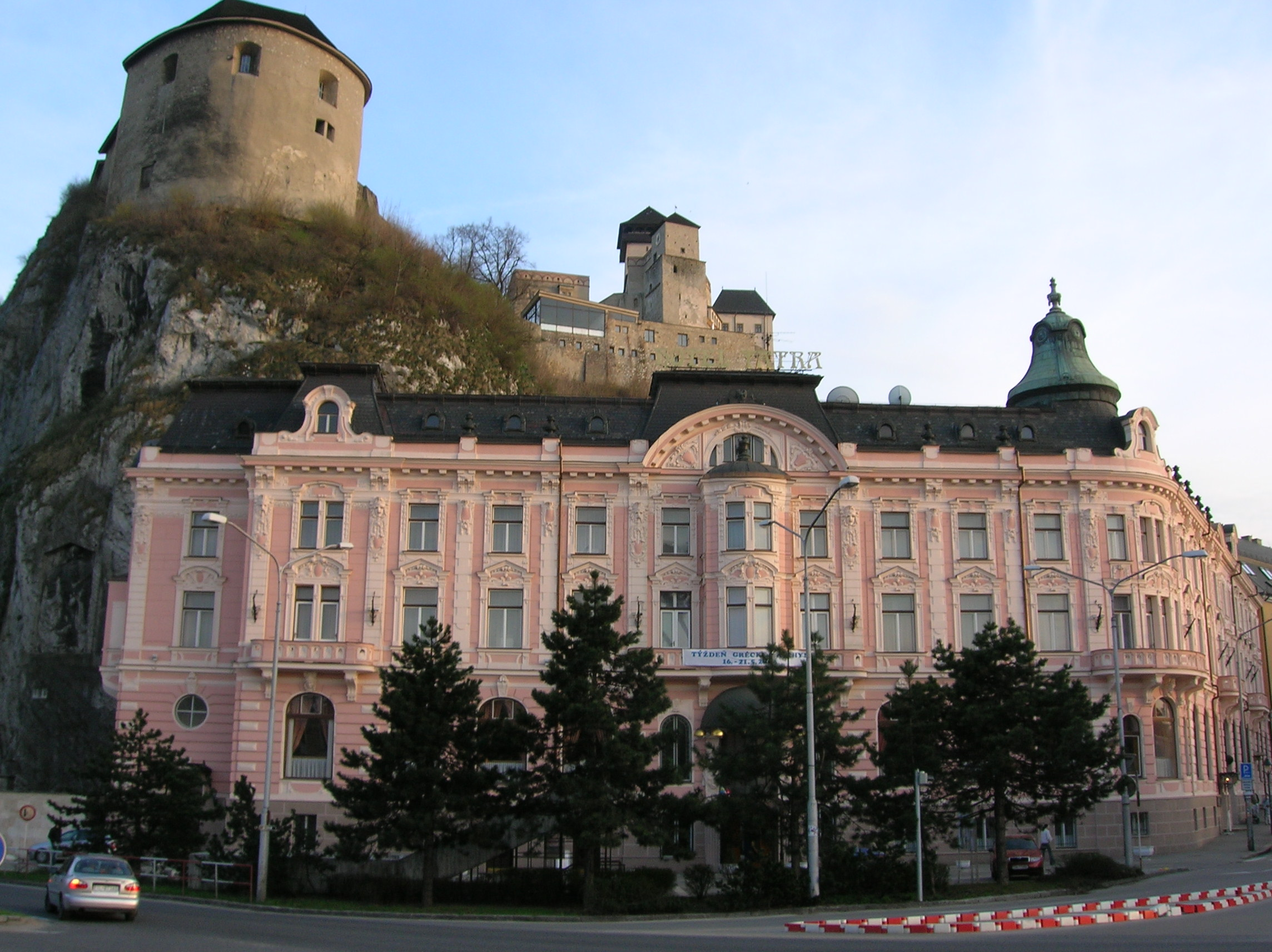
Trenčin Castle above the Hotel Tatra (Elisabeth)

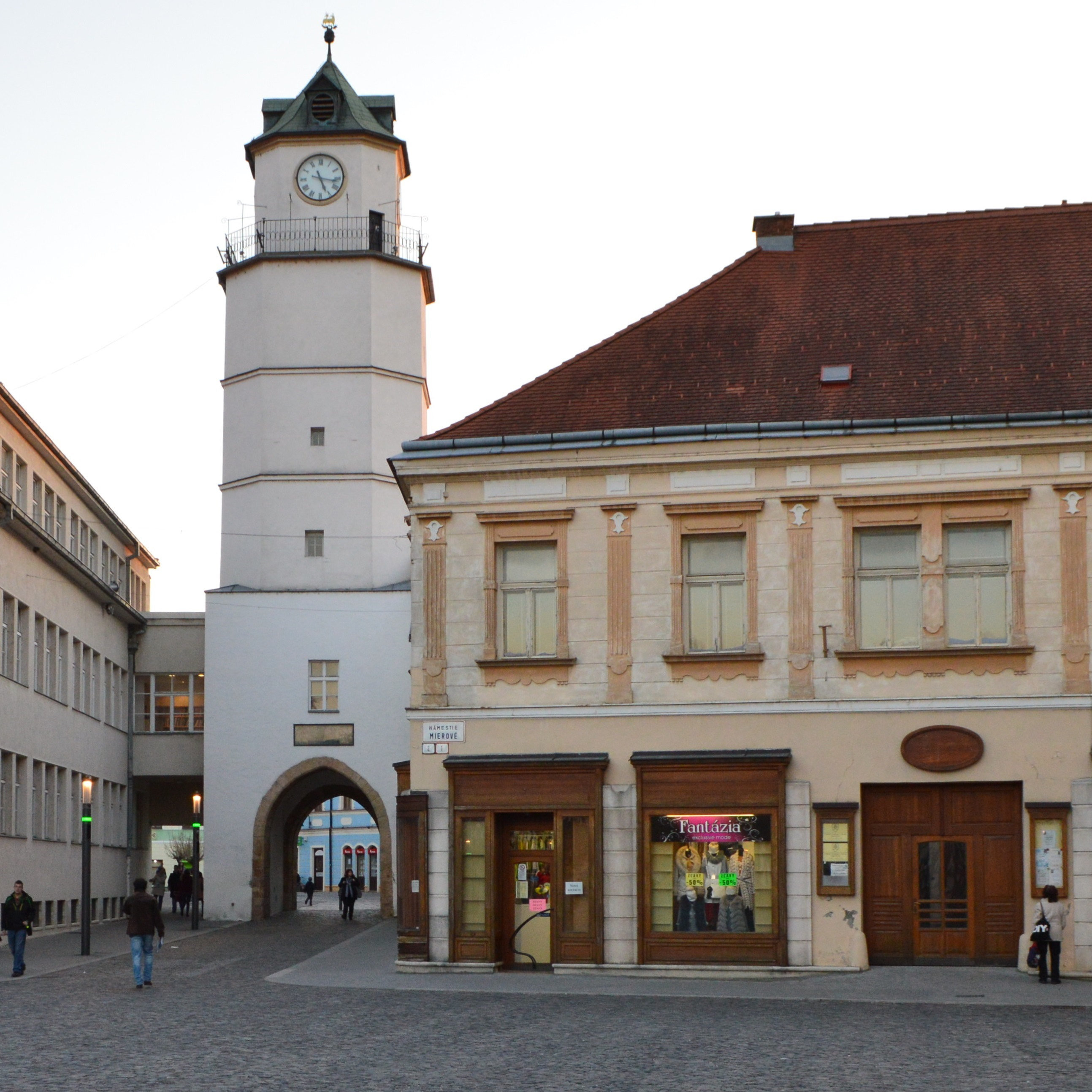
Lower Gate, Trenčín

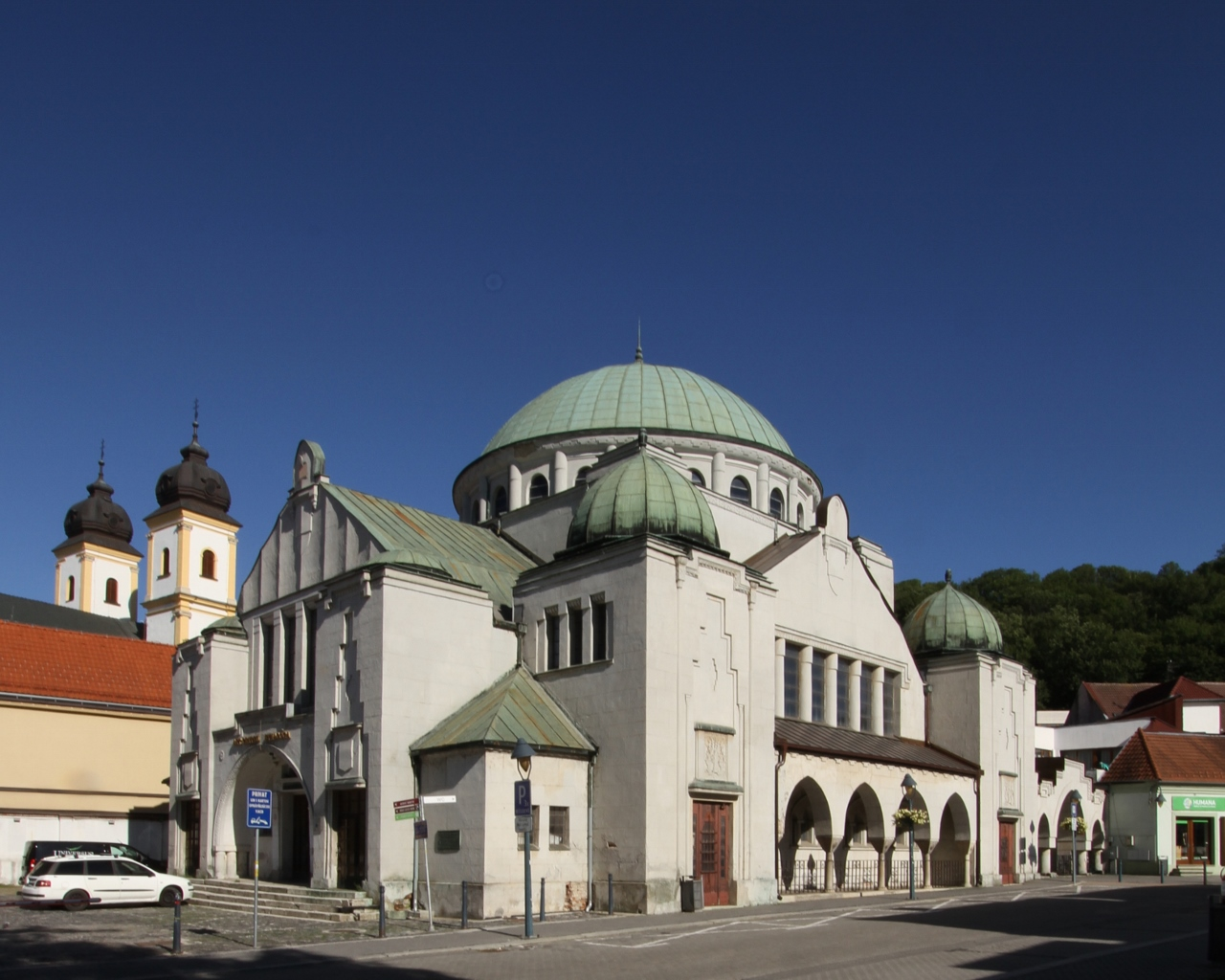
Trenčín Synagogue, Trenčín

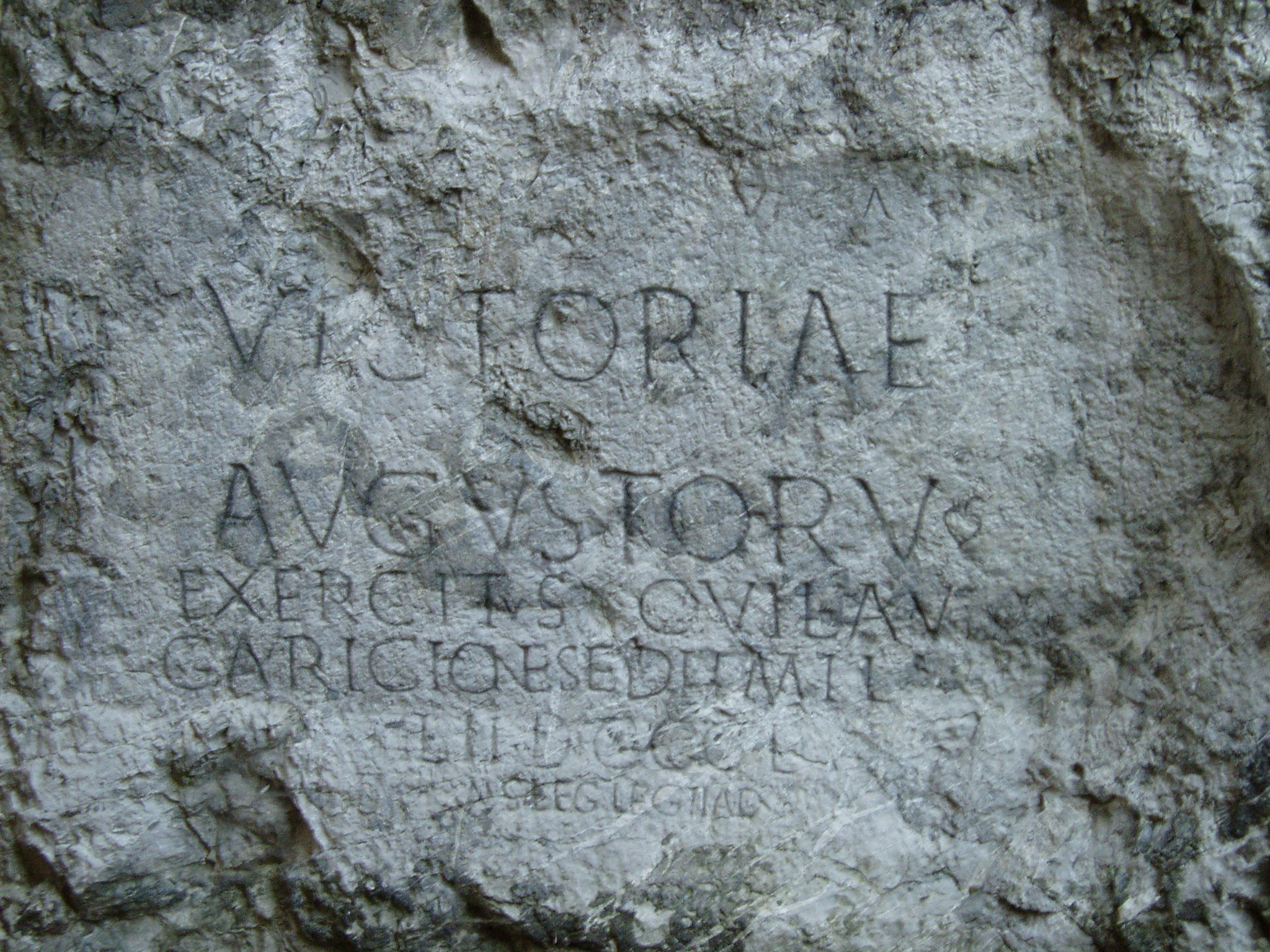
Roman inscription on the castle rock in Trenčín

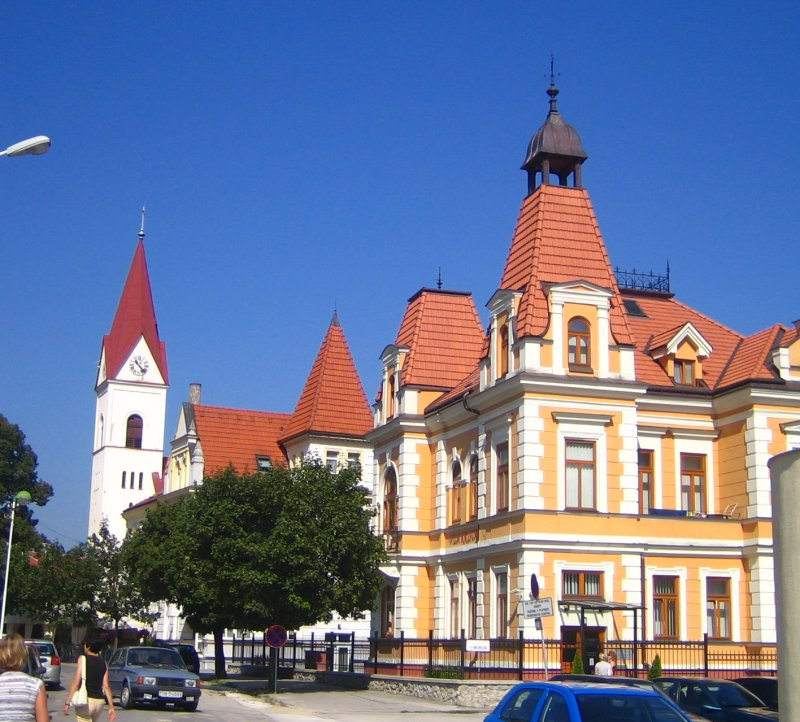
Trenčianske Teplice

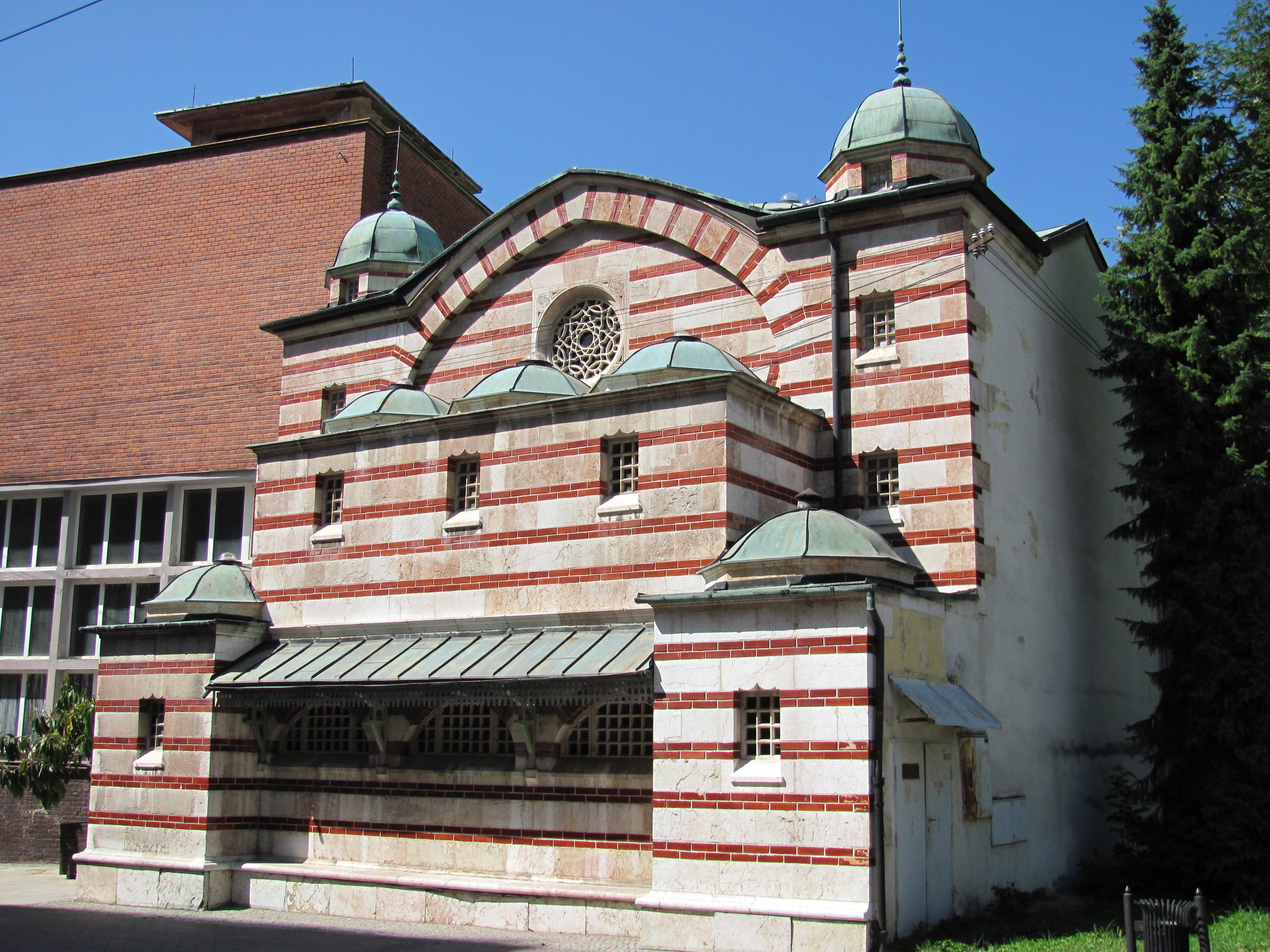
Hamman in Trenčianske Teplice

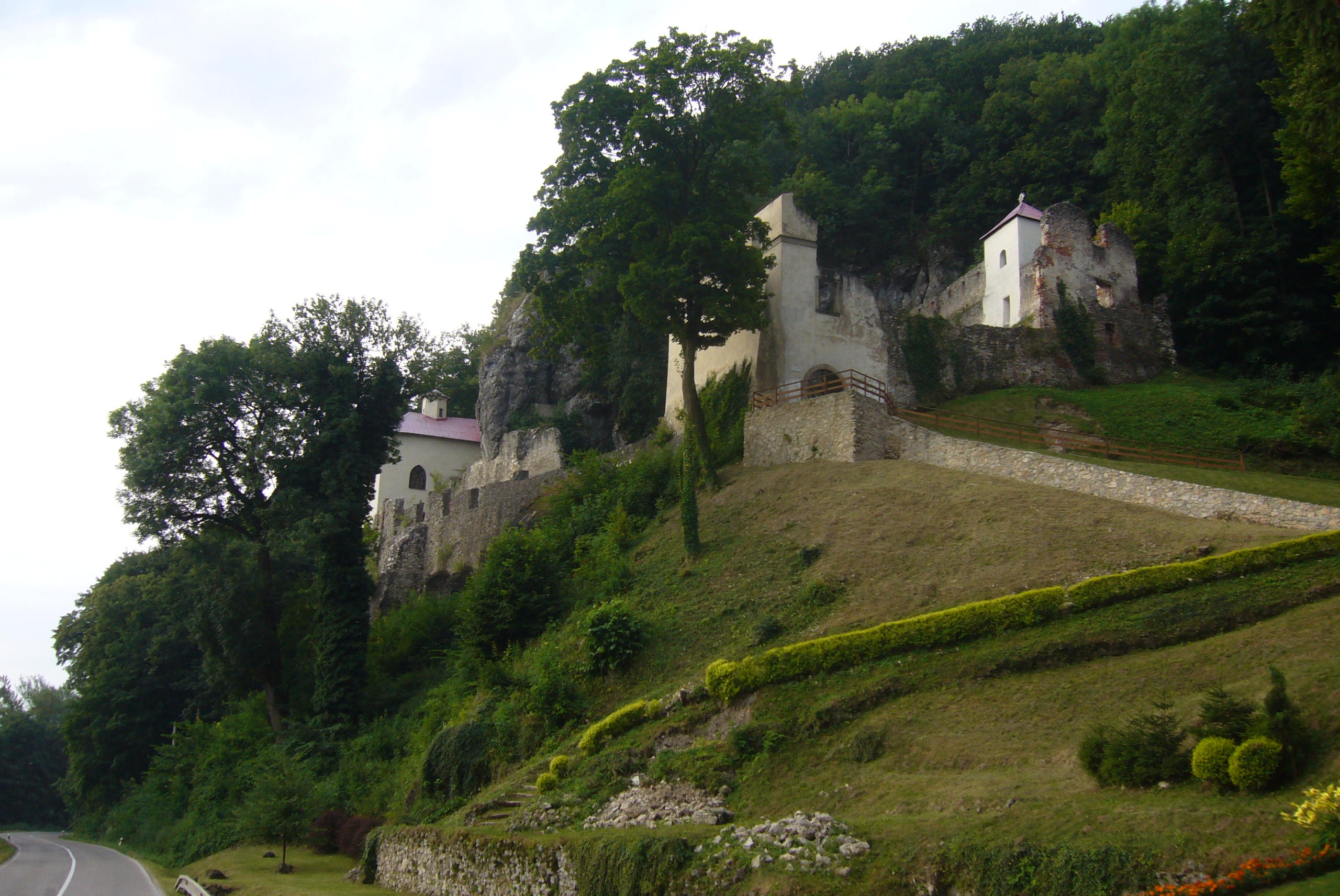
Skalka pri Trenčíne monastery

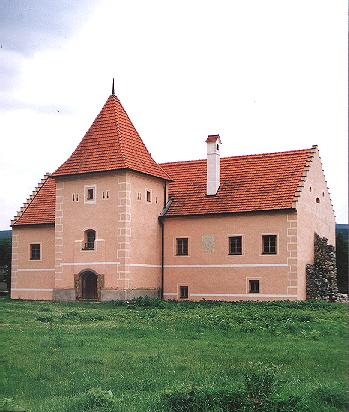
Šimonovany Castle, Partizánske

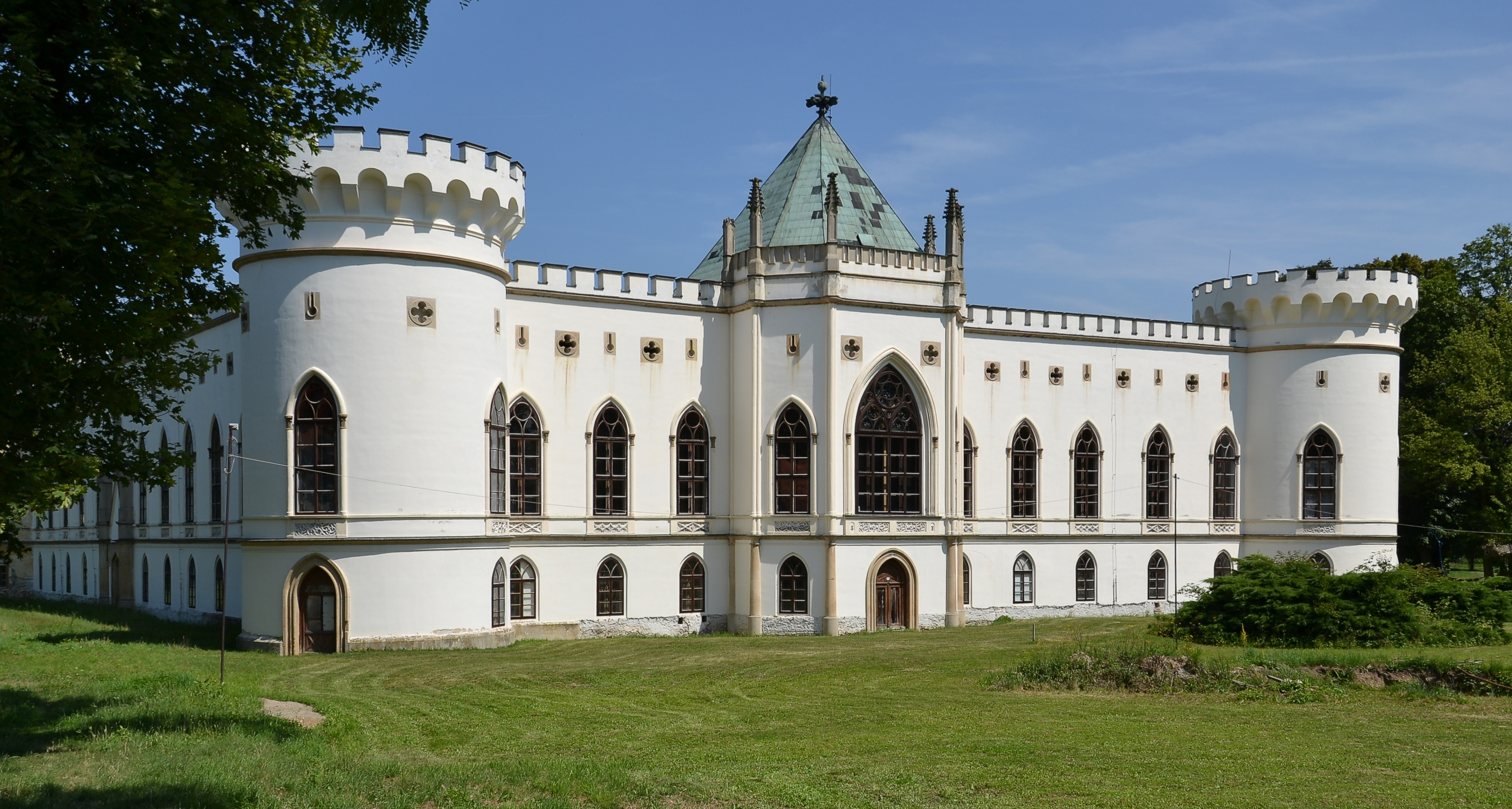
Veké Uherce Castle, Veľké Uherce

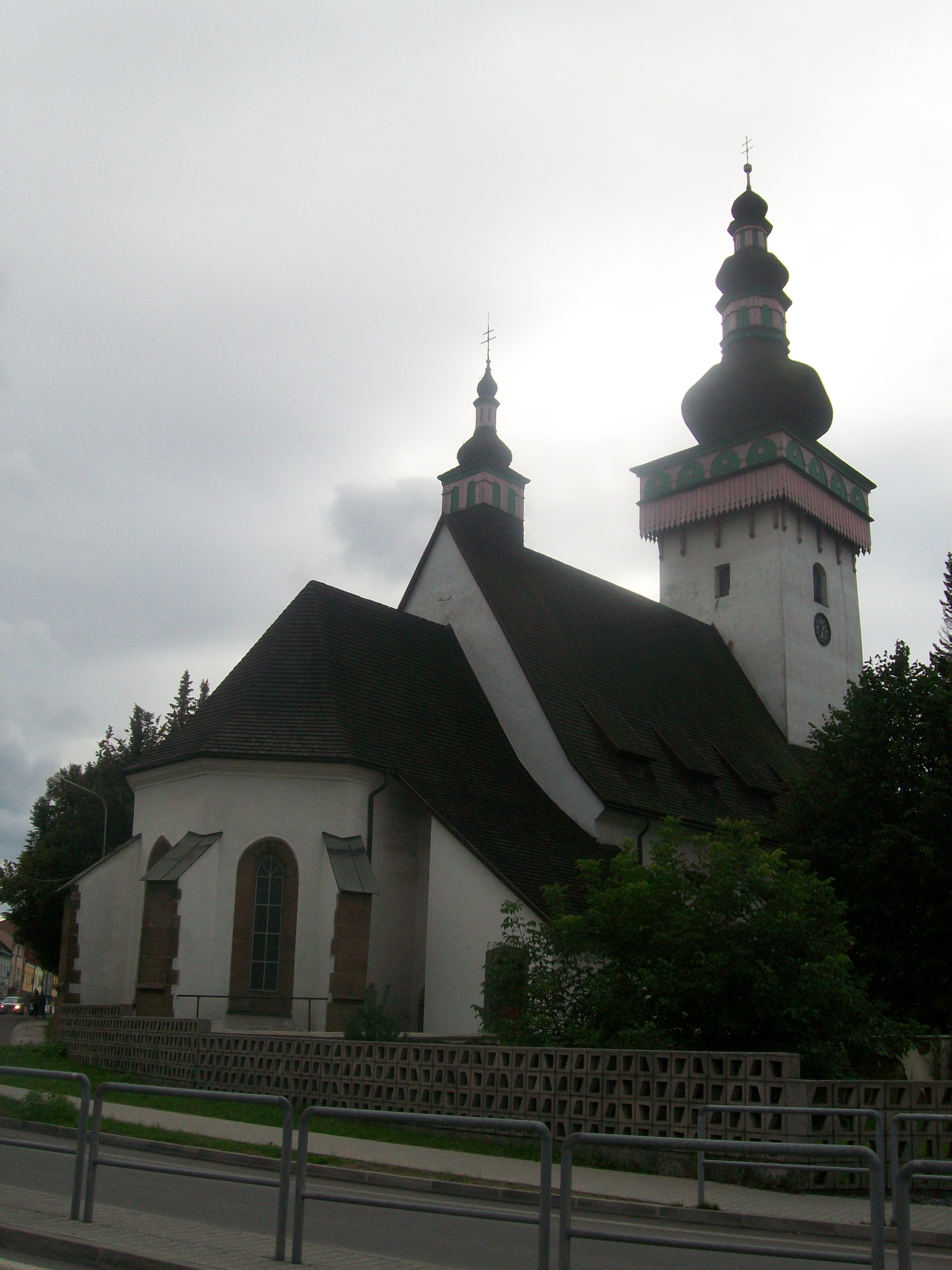
Handlová

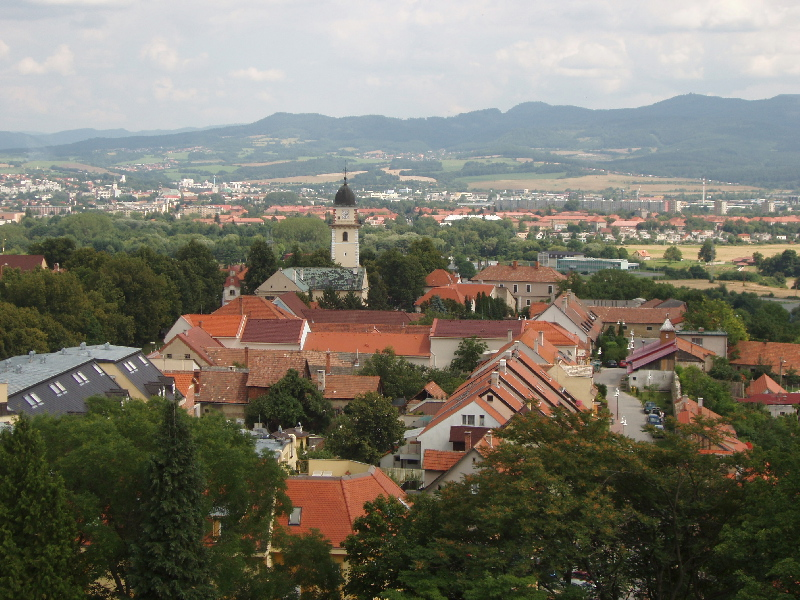
Bojnice

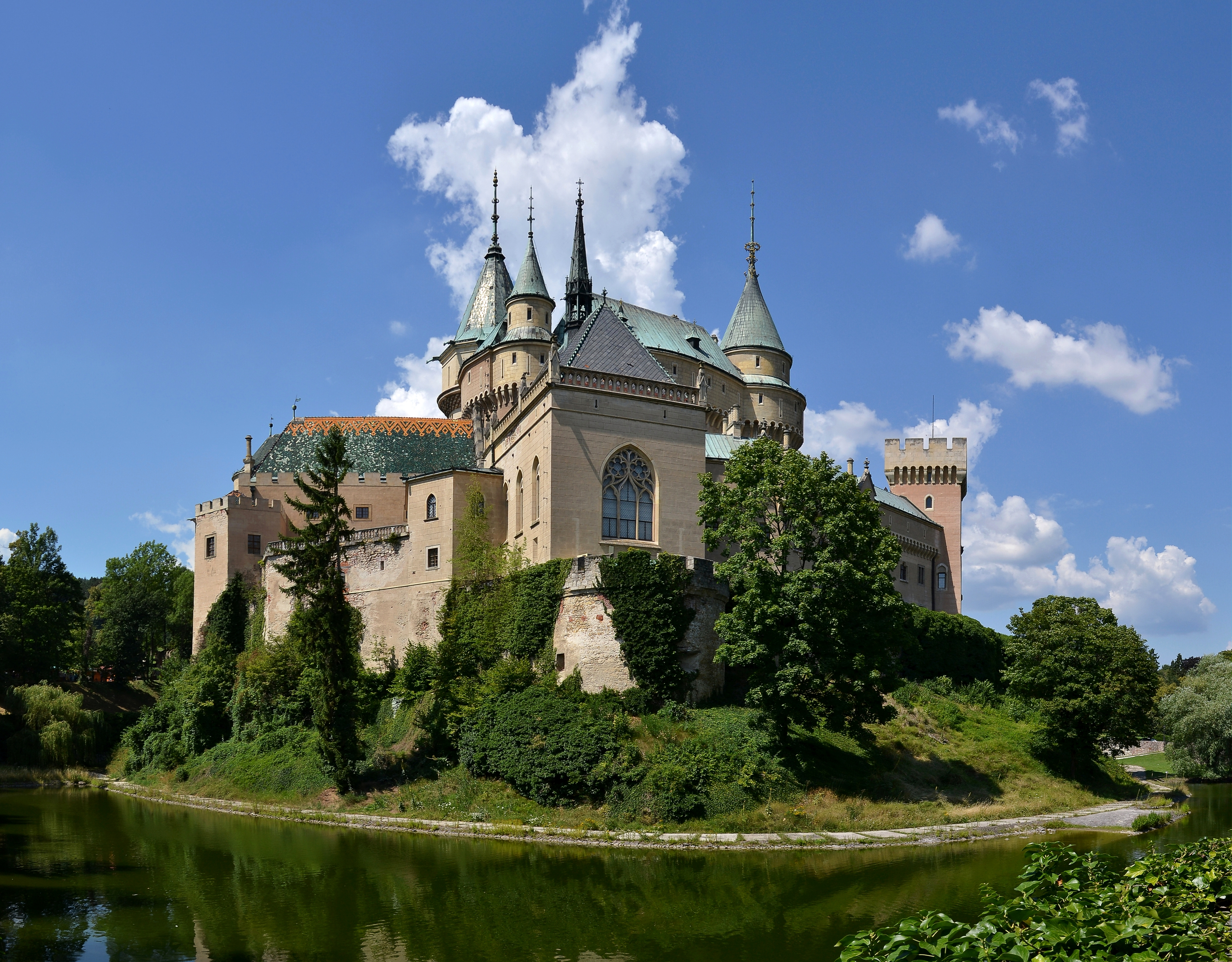
Bojnice Castle, Bojnice

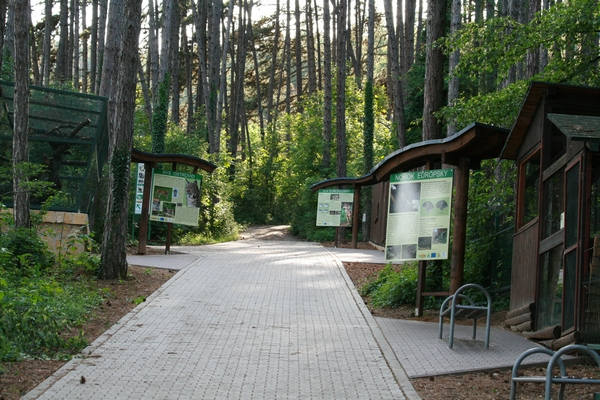
Bojnice Zoo, Bojnice

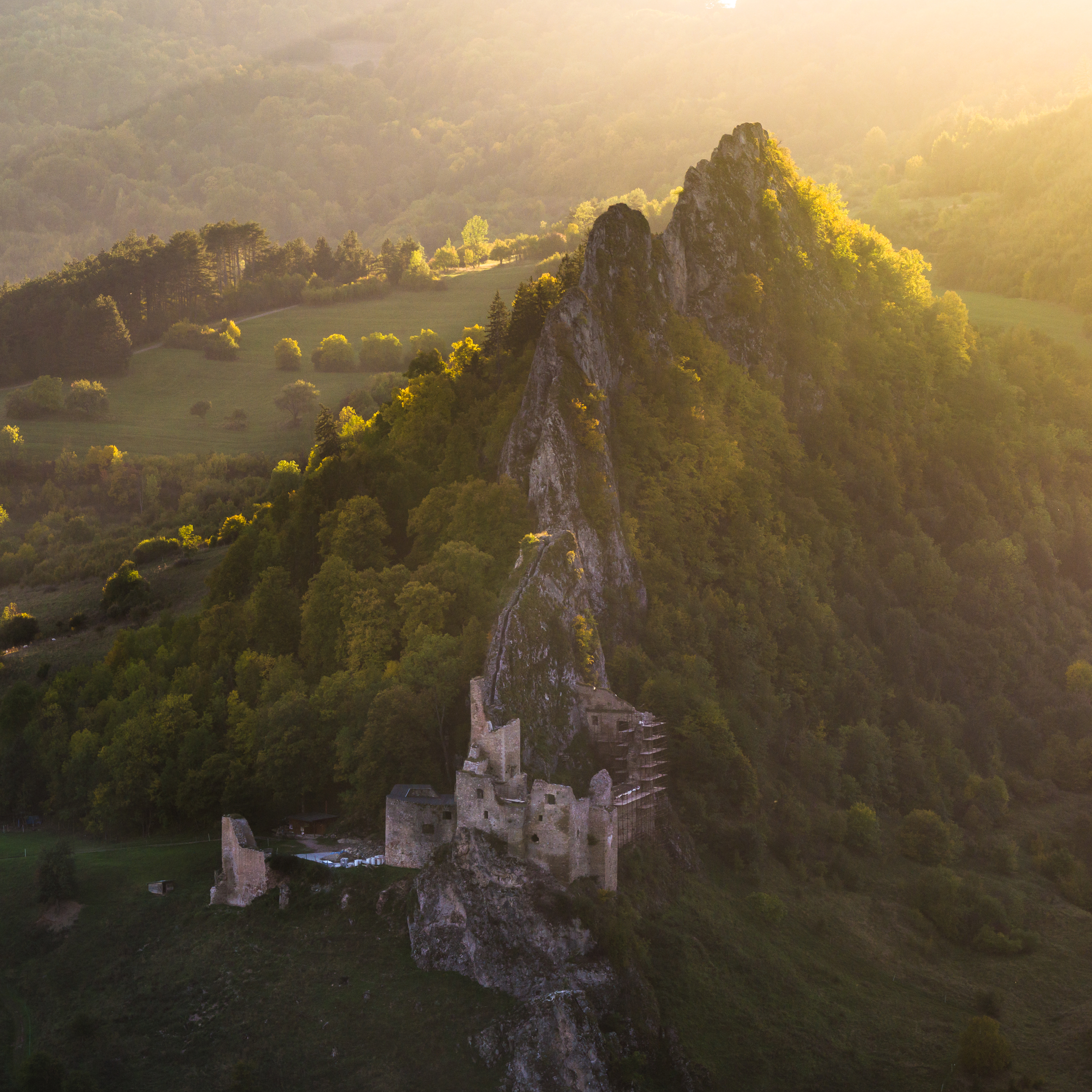
Lednica Castle, Lednica

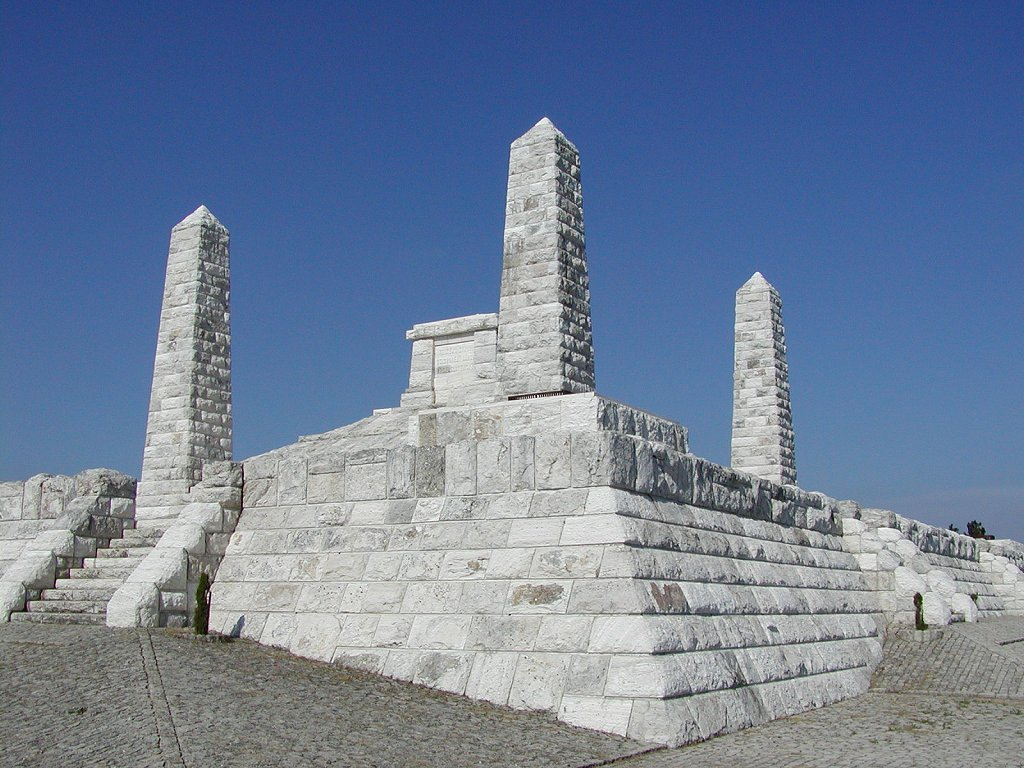
Milan Rastislav Štefánik tomb on the Bradlo, Brezová pod Bradlom

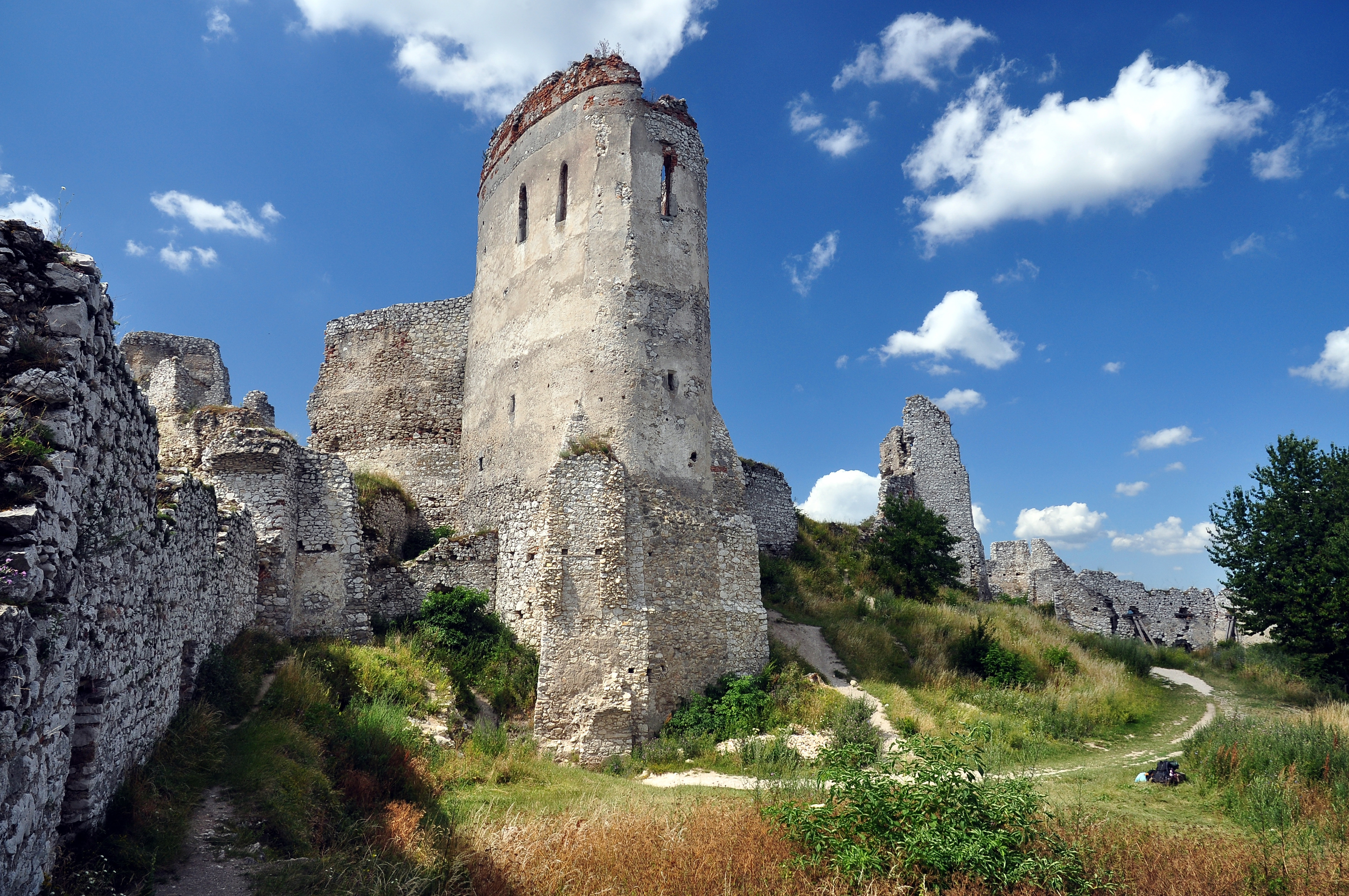
Čachtice Castle, Čachtice

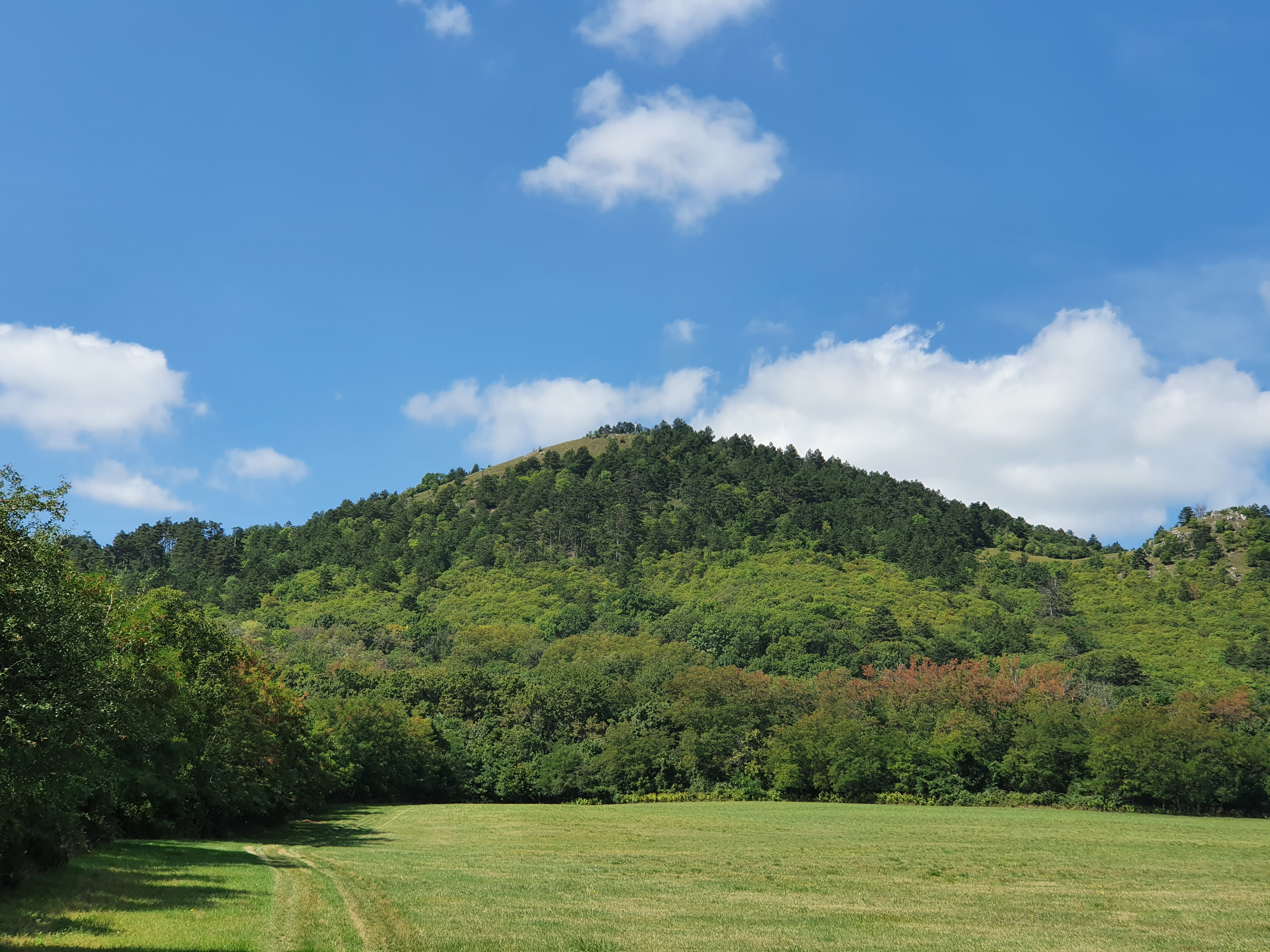
Little Carpathians Protected Landscape Area

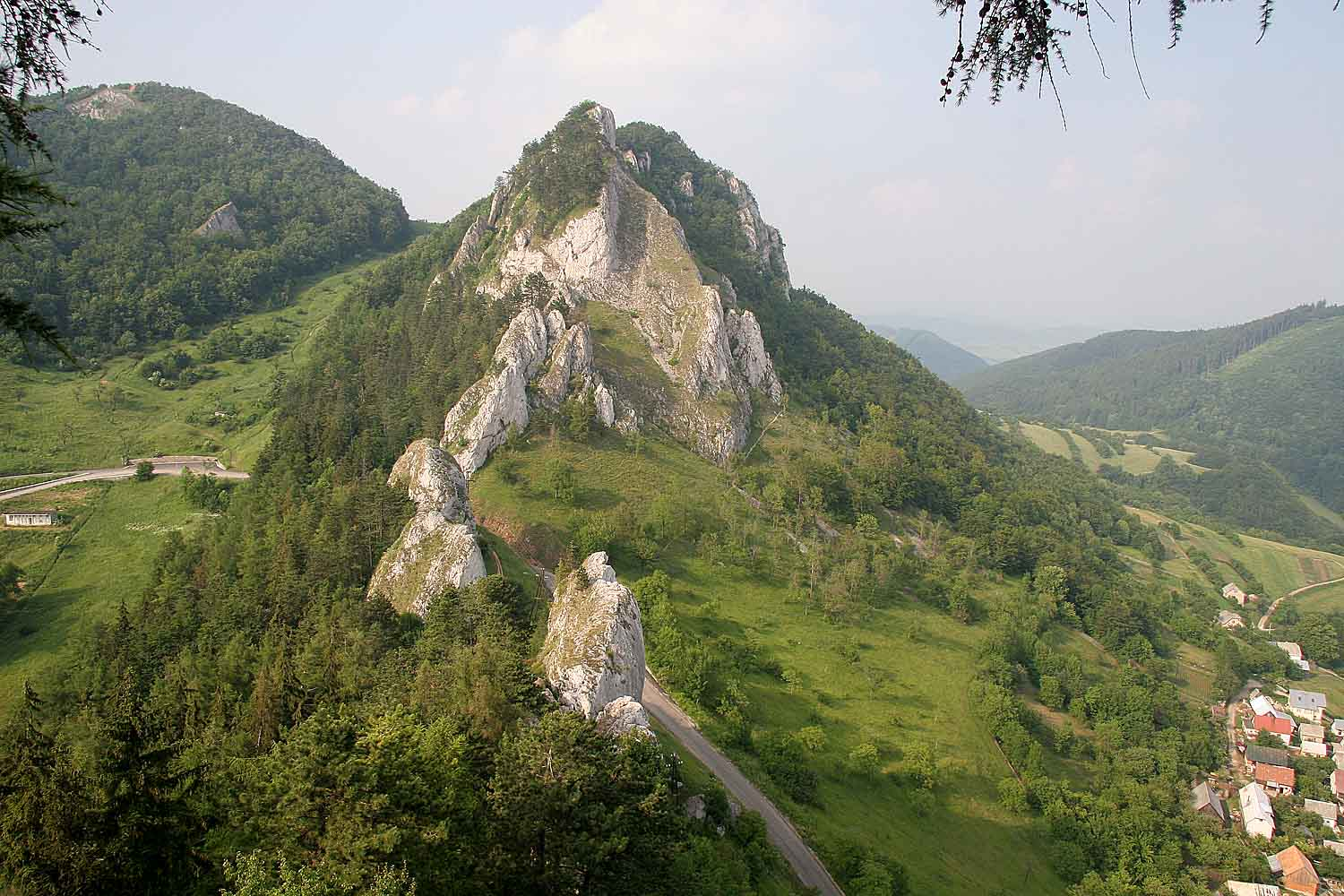
White Carpathians Protected Landscape Area

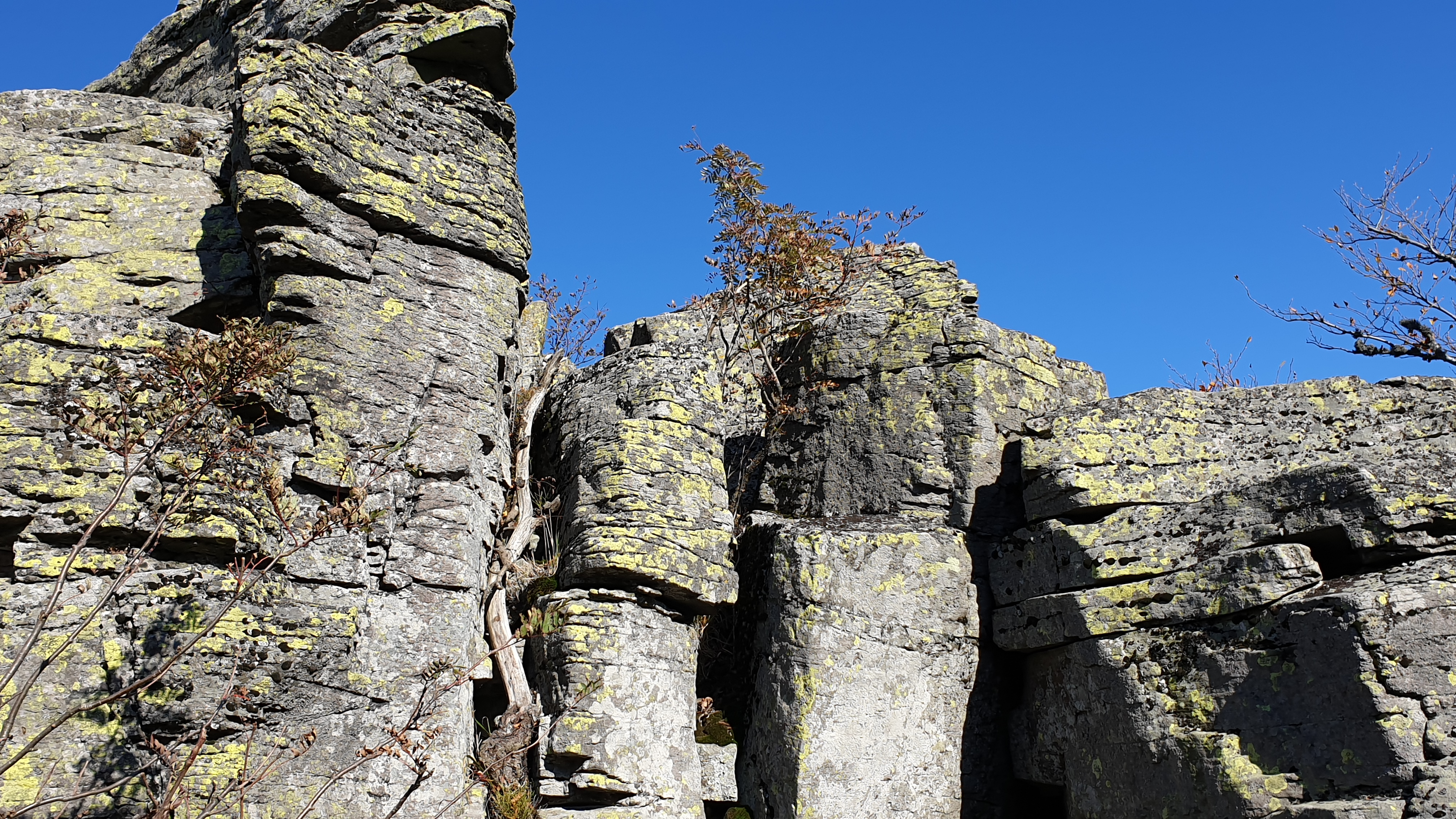
Ponitrie Protected Landscape Area

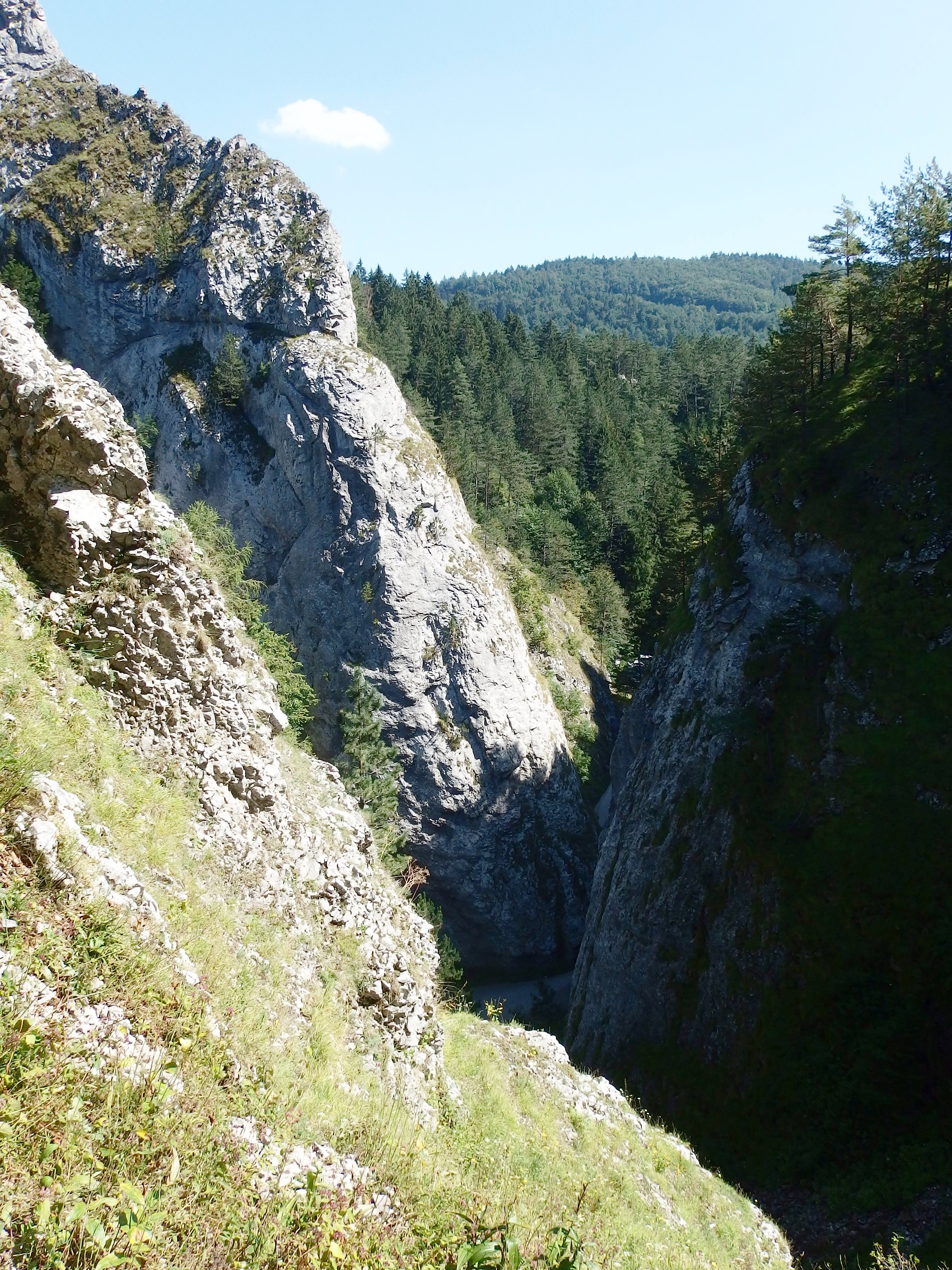
Manínska Gorge

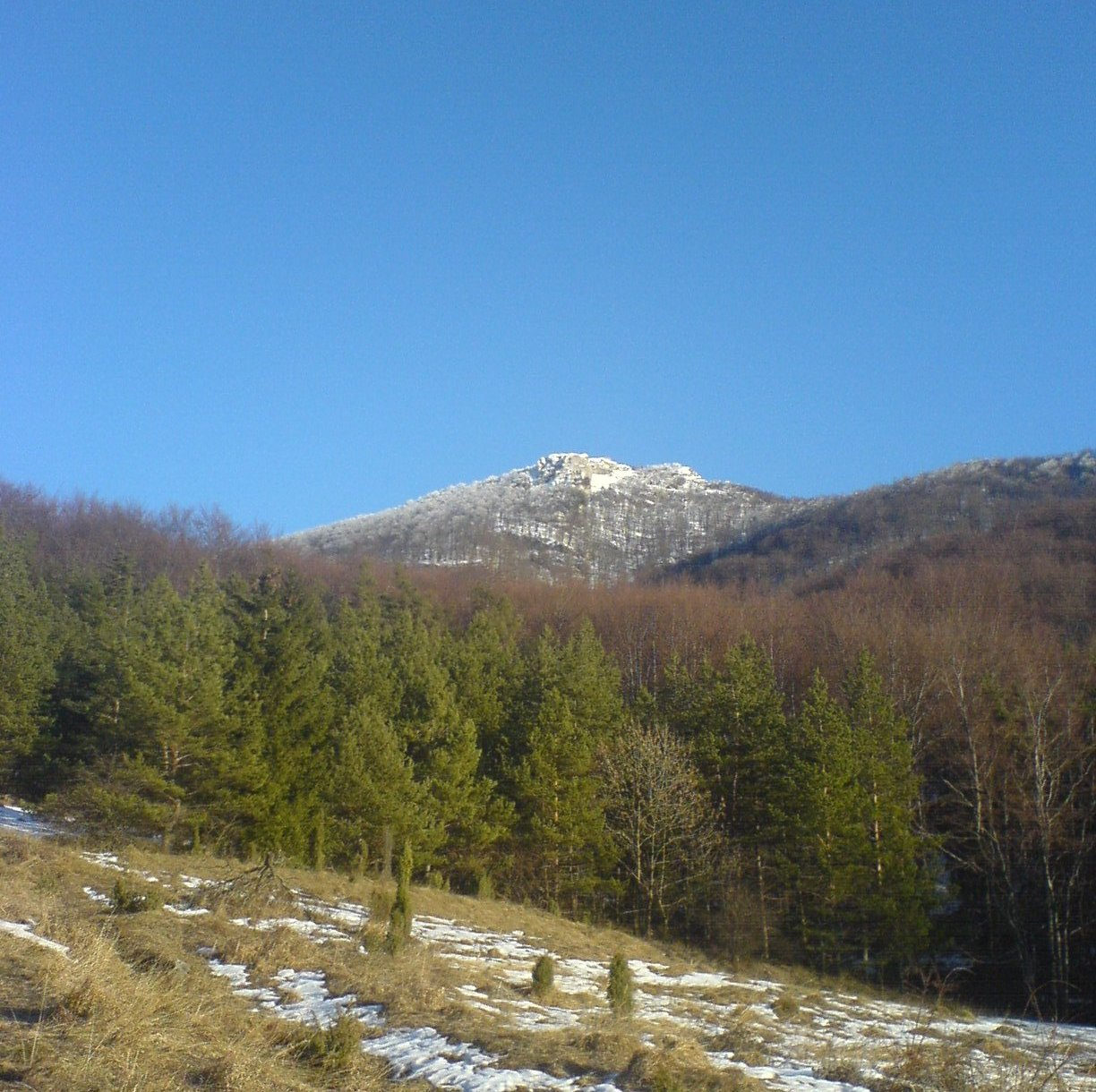
Strážov Mountains Protected Landscape Area

== See also ==
- Trencsén County of the Kingdom of Hungary
