= Manínska Gorge =

Nature reserve in Slovakia

Coordinates: 49.141506°N 18.506097°E

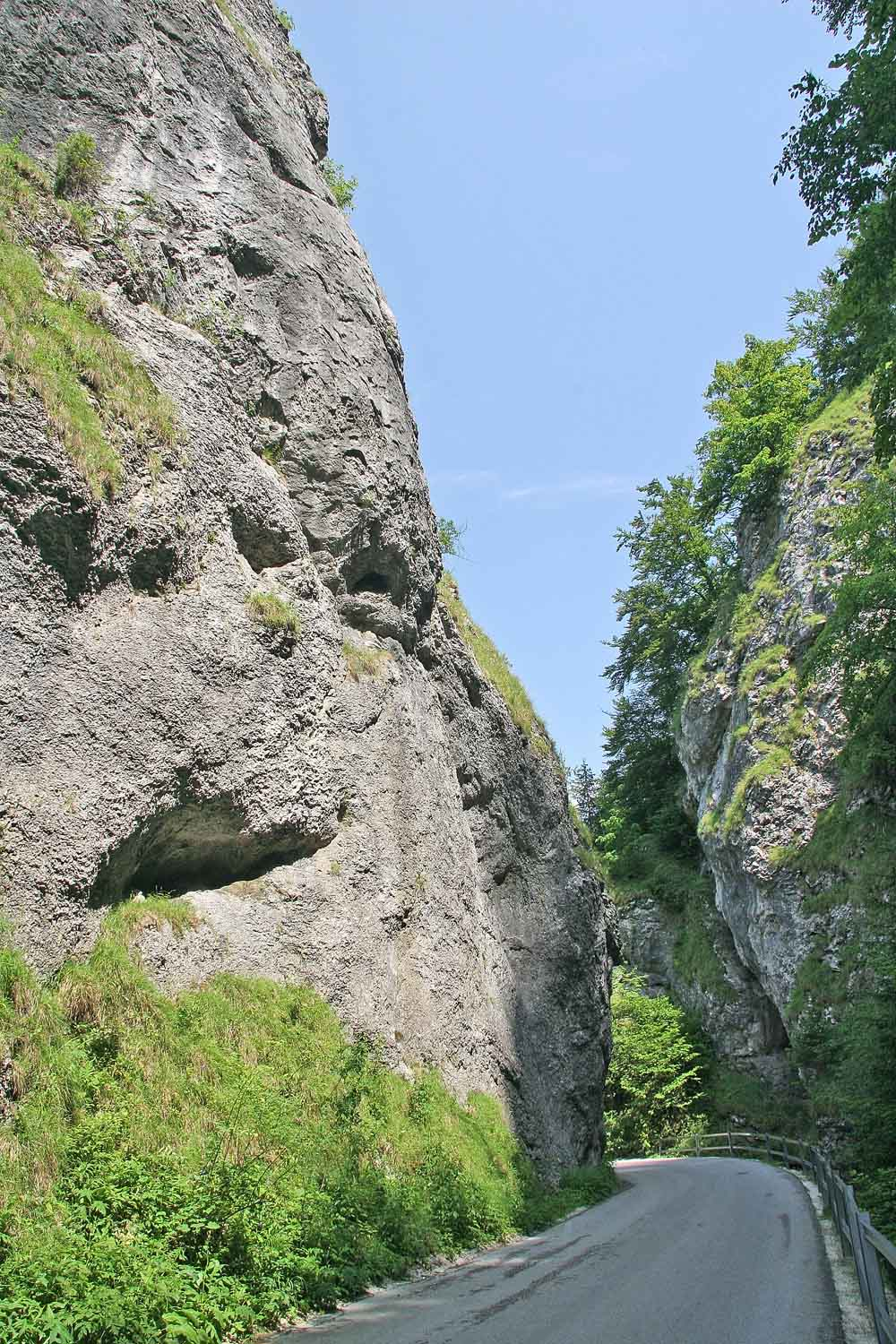

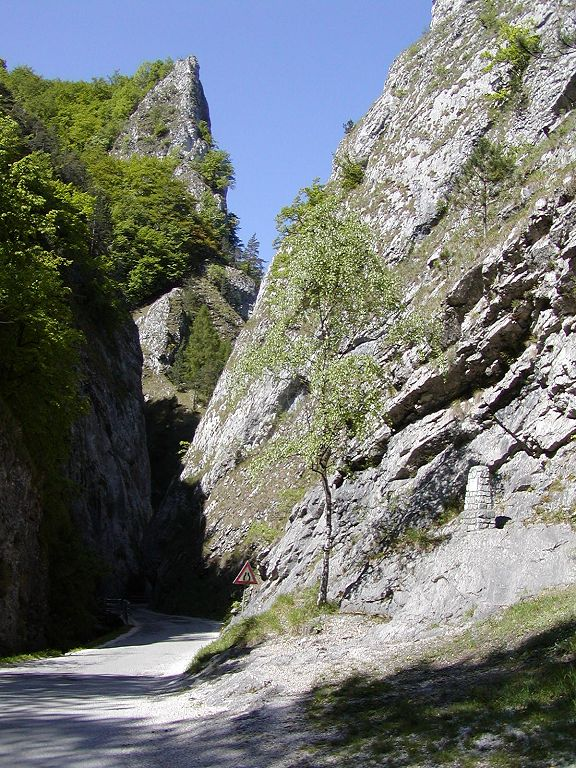

Manínska Gorge (in Slovak, Manínska tiesňava) is a national nature reserve, and the narrowest canyon in Slovakia.

It lies in the Súľov Mountains, 6 km (3.7 miles) from Považská Bystrica. It is a place of great tourist interest due to its wild and rare flora and fauna.
