= Strážov Mountains Protected Landscape Area =

Protected landscape area of Slovakia

Strážov Mountains Protected Landscape Area CHKO Strážovské vrchy
- IUCN category V (protected landscape/seascape)
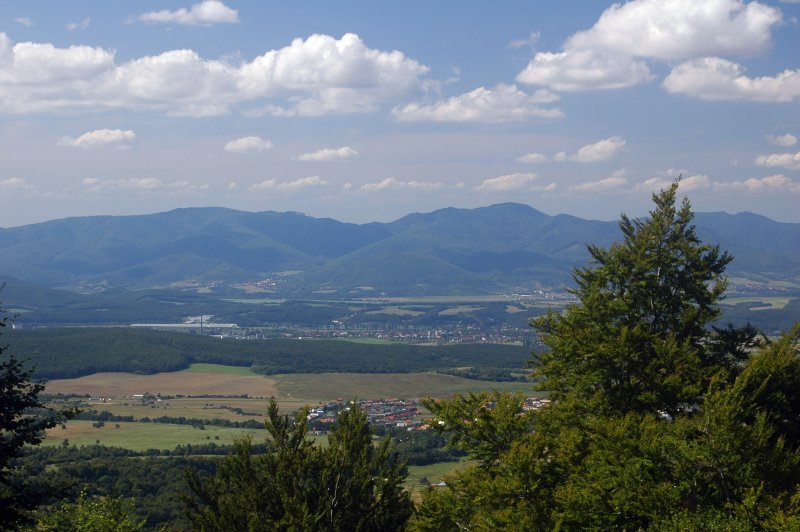
- Strážov Mountains from Vtáčnik Mts.
- Interactive map of Strážov Mountains Protected Landscape Area; CHKO Strážovské vrchy
- Location: West Slovakia: Strážov Mountains and Súľov Mountains
- Coordinates: 48°57′N 18°27′E
- Area: 293.66 km^{2} (113.38 mi^{2})
- Established: 27 January 1989
- Governing body: Správa CHKO Strážovské vrchy (CHKO Strážovské vrchy administration) in Považská Bystrica

Strážov Mountains Protected Landscape Area (Slovak: Chránená krajinná oblasť Strážovské vrchy) is one of the 14 protected landscape areas in Slovakia. The Landscape Area is situated in the Strážov Mountains and the Súľov Mountains, part of the Western Carpathians, in western Slovakia. It is situated in the Bytča, Ilava, Považská Bystrica, Prievidza, Púchov, and Žilina districts.

The area protects 293.66 km^{2} (113.38 mi^{2}), of which 78% are covered with forests, 19% with farmland and 3% with built-up and water areas. The highest point is Strážov Mountain at 1,213 m (3,980 ft).

== History ==
The Protected Landscape Area was established on 27 January 1989. Protected areas declared before include the national nature reserves of Súľov Rocks (declared in 1973) and Strážov (1981) and the nature reserve of Kostolecká tiesňava Ravine (1970).

== Geography ==
The highest mountains in the Strážov Mountains are Strážov at 1,213.3 m (3,981 ft), Sokolie at 1,032 m (3,386 ft) and Vápeč at 956 m (3,136 ft). The highest mountains in the Súľov Mountains are Veľký Manín at 890 m (2,920 ft) and Žibrid at 867 m (2,844 ft).
