= Súľov Mountains =

Mountain range in Slovakia

Coordinates: 49.1667°N 18.5833°E

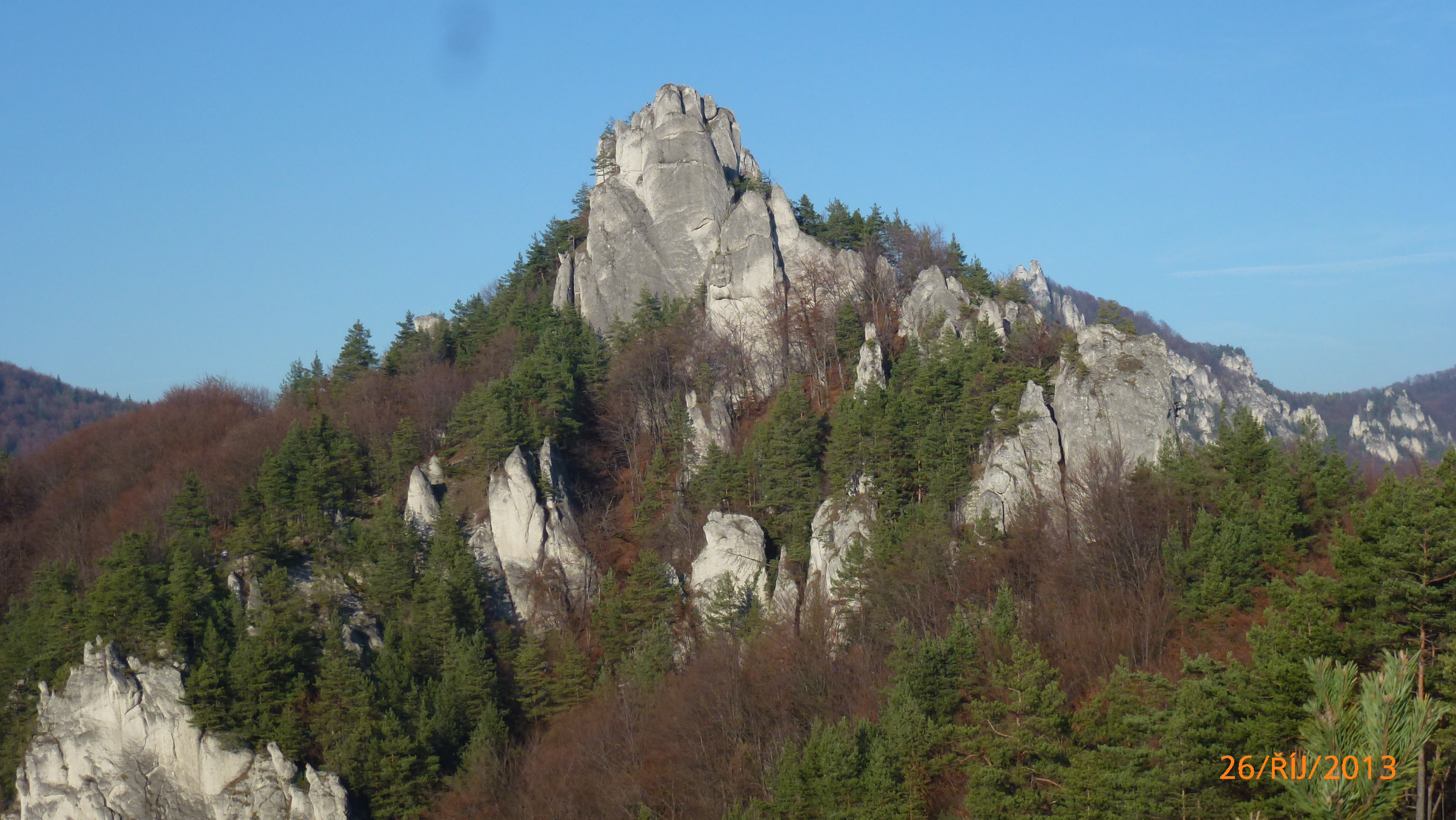
Súľov Rocks

The Súľov Mountains (in Slovak, Súľovské vrchy) is a rugged mountain range in Slovakia, the northwestern part of the Fatra-Tatra Area of the Inner Western Carpathians. Its highest peak is Veľký Manín, at 890 meters.

The Súľov Mountains is the location of:

- the Súľov Rocks, a national nature reserve open for hiking and rock-climbing. The highest peak in this area is Žibrid (867 meters)
- the national nature reserves of the Manínska Gorge and the Kostolecká Gorge
- the Bosmany natural monument
- the extensive castle ruins of the 13th century Lietava Castle and the 15th century Súľovský Castle

A portion of the Súľovs is also protected by the Strážov Mountains Protected Landscape Area.
