= Súľov Rocks =

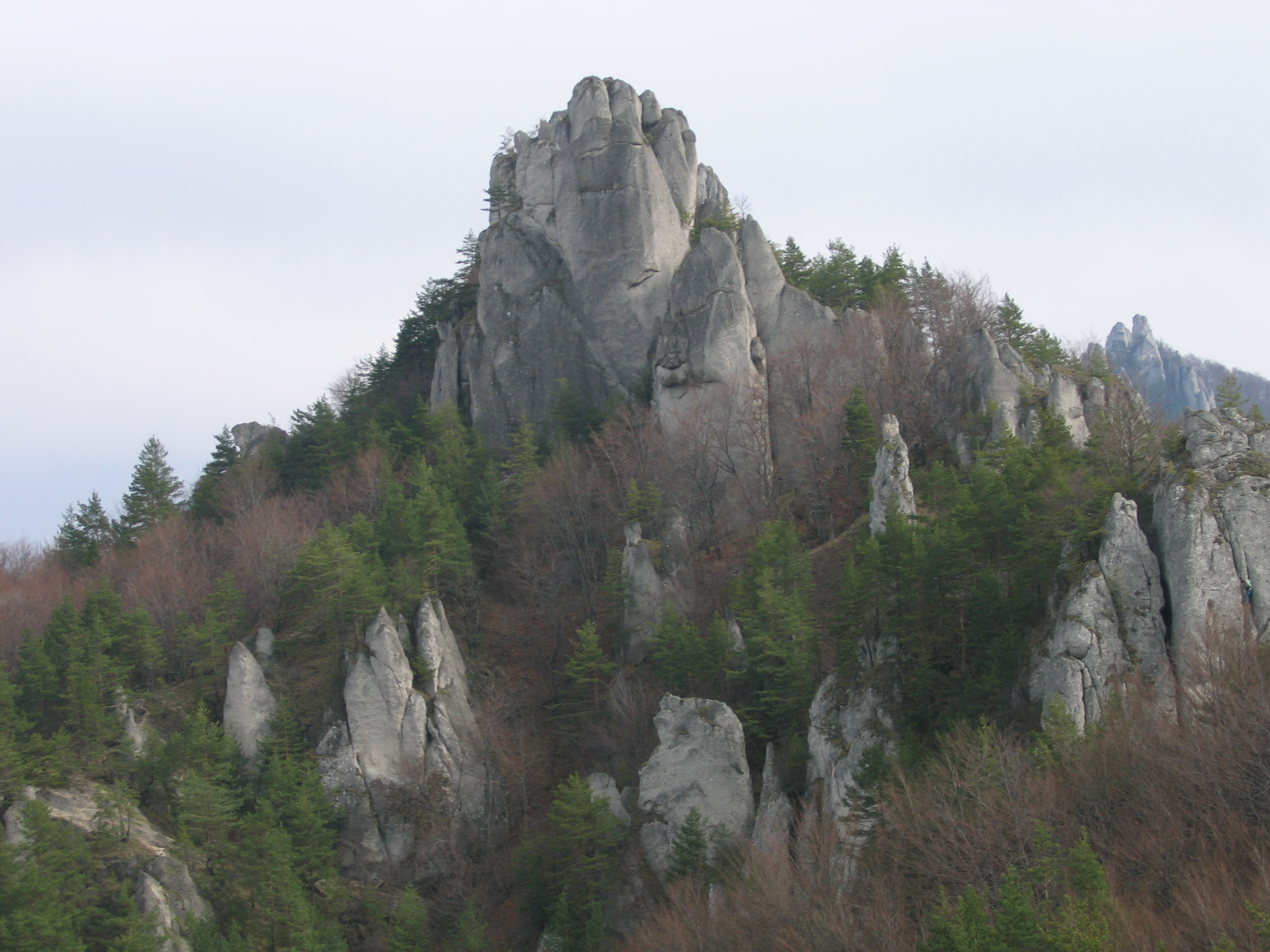

- Location within Slovakia
- Location: Žilina Region, Slovakia
- Nearest city: Žilina
- Coordinates: 49°10′36″N 18°34′52″E
- Area: 5.43 km^{2} (2.10 mi^{2})
- Established: 1973
- Website: uzemia.enviroportal.sk/main/detail/cislo/437

The Súľov Rocks (Slovak: Súľovské skaly) is a 5.43 km^{2} (2.10 mi^{2}) national nature reserve situated within the Súľov Mountains region of Slovakia.

It was declared in 1973 and is located in the Bytča District in Žilina Region. Rocky crags take the shape of towers, cones, needles, gates, and some rocks resemble figures or animals.

The area is accessible by hiking, climbing and biking.
