= Protected areas of Slovakia =

Protected areas of Slovakia are areas that need protection because of their environmental, historical or cultural value to the nation. Protected areas in Slovakia are managed by institutions and organizations governed by the Ministry of the Environment.

Types of protected areas:

- National Park (Slovak: Národný park; abbr. NP)
- Protected Landscape Area (Chránená krajinná oblasť; ChKO)
- National Nature Reserve (Národná prírodná rezervácia; NPR)
- Nature Reserve (Prírodná rezervácia; PR)
- National Nature Monument (Národná prírodná pamiatka; NPP)
- Nature Monument (Prírodná pamiatka; PP)
- Protected Site (Chránený areál; ChA)
- Protected Landscape Element (Chránený krajinný prvok; ChKP)
- Protected Bird Area* (Chránené vtáčie územie; ChVÚ) *Technically Special Protection Area (SPA) under the EU Bird's Directive
- Protected Tree (Chránený strom; ChS)

== National Parks ==
National parks of Slovakia (9)

== Protected Landscape Areas ==
- Little Carpathians Protected Landscape Area (CHKO Malé Karpaty)
- White Carpathians Protected Landscape Area (CHKO Biele Karpaty)
- Cerová vrchovina Protected Landscape Area (CHKO Cerová vrchovina)
- Dunajské luhy Protected Landscape Area (CHKO Dunajské luhy)
- Horná Orava Protected Landscape Area (CHKO Horná Orava)
- Kysuce Protected Landscape Area (CHKO Kysuce)
- Latorica Protected Landscape Area (CHKO Latorica)
- Poľana Protected Landscape Area (CHKO Poľana)
- Ponitrie Protected Landscape Area (CHKO Ponitrie)
- Strážov Mountains Protected Landscape Area (CHKO Strážovské vrchy)
- Štiavnica Mountains Protected Landscape Area (CHKO Štiavnické vrchy)
- Vihorlat Protected Landscape Area (CHKO Vihorlat)
- East Carpathians Protected Landscape Area (CHKO Východné Karpaty)
- Záhorie Protected Landscape Area (CHKO Záhorie)

== Other ==
For the list of National Nature Reserves, Nature Reserves, National Nature Monuments, Nature Monuments, and Protected Sites, see the State Inventory of Specially Protected Parts of Nature and Landscape

For the list of Protected Trees, see enviroportal.sk (in Slovak).

=== National Nature Reserves ===
- Belianske Tatras
- Devínska Kobyla
- Morské oko
- Strážov
- Stužica

Protected Sites

- Abrahámsky Park
- Okšov oaks

== History ==
Between the years 1994 – 2006 the following Protected Sites were cancelled:

- CHA Červený rak
- CHA Hradná zeleň
- CHA Koliba
- CHA Mirovského záhrada
- CHA Nemocničný park
- CHA Vešeléniho záhrada
- CHA Vodárenská zeleň
- CHA Záhrada na Búdkovej
- CHA Zeleň pri vodárni

The CHKO Malé Karpaty was reduced with the Sitina part no longer protected. In the same time-frame a new Protected Landscape Area was created, the Dunajské luhy Protected Landscape Area.

== See also ==
- List of national parks of Slovakia
