= Ponitrie Protected Landscape Area =

Protected landscape area of Slovakia

Ponitrie Protected Landscape Area CHKO Ponitrie
- IUCN category V (protected landscape/seascape)
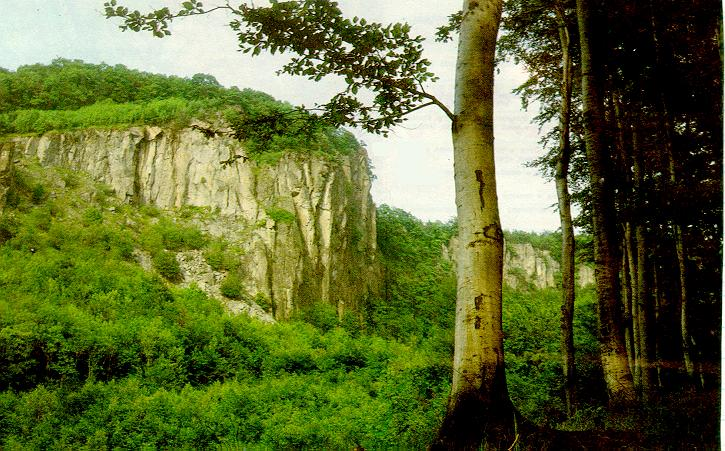
- Hrádok, Vtáčnik mountains
- Interactive map of Ponitrie Protected Landscape Area; CHKO Ponitrie
- Location: Western Slovakia
- Coordinates: 48°37′N 19°28′E
- Area: 376.65 km^{2} (145.43 mi^{2})
- Established: 24 June 1985
- Governing body: Správa CHKO Ponitrie (Ponitrie PLA administration) in Nitra

Ponitrie Protected Landscape Area (Slovak: Chránená krajinná oblasť Ponitrie) is one of the 14 protected landscape areas in Slovakia. The Landscape Area is situated in the Tribeč and Vtáčnik mountains, in western Slovakia. It is situated in the Nitra, Zlaté Moravce, Žarnovica, Topoľčany, Partizánske and Prievidza districts.

== History ==
The park was created on 24 June 1985. Protected areas declared before include Dobrotínske skaly (1980), Makovište (1973), Solčiansky háj (1984), and Zoborská lesostep (1952).

== Geography and geology ==
Although the PLA's territory is compact, it is made of two different landscapes. Vtáčnik, in the north is a range of volcanic origin and is part of the Slovenské stredohorie mountains. Beech and fir trees dominate in the area. The highest mountain is Vtáčnik at 1,345.8 m (4,415 ft). Tribeč, in the south, is a crystalline mountain range built on granitoid rocks, limestone and dolomite. Beech, hornbeam and in higher locations oak forests are covering the area. The highest mountain is Veľký Tribeč at 829.6 m (2,722 ft).
