= Jelenec =

Jelenec Gímes
- Municipality
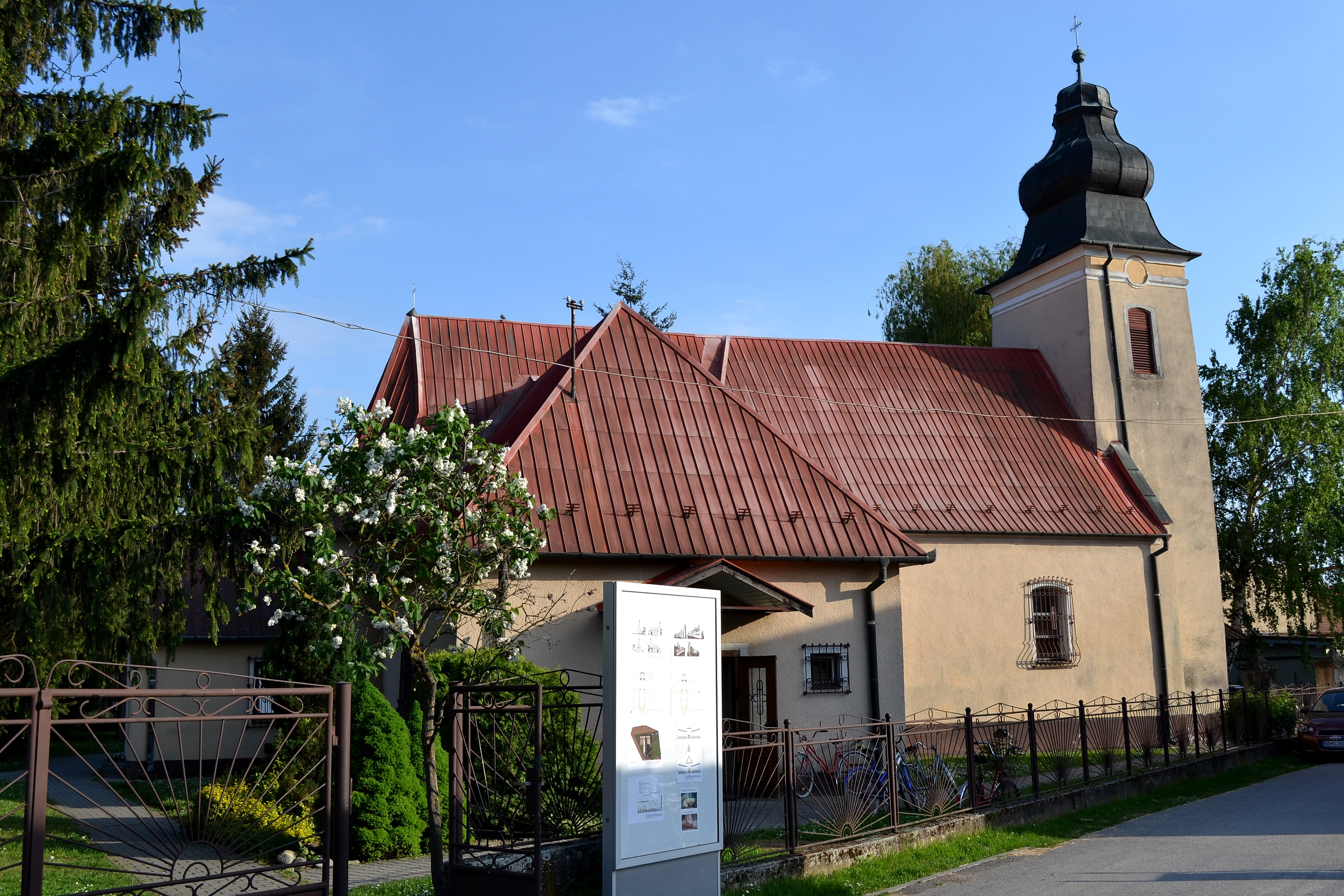
- The church in the centre of the village

- Flag

- Location of Jelenec in the Nitra Region Location of Jelenec in Slovakia
- Coordinates: 48.38°N 18.22°E
- Country: Slovakia
- Region: Nitra Region
- District: Nitra District
- First mentioned: 1113

Area
  - Total: 27.18 km^{2} (10.49 sq mi)
- Elevation: 197 m (646 ft)

Population (2025)
  - Total: 2,096
- Time zone: UTC+1 (CET)
  - Summer (DST): UTC+2 (CEST)
- Postal code: 951 73
- Area code: +421 37
- Vehicle registration plate (until 2022): NR
- Website: www.jelenec.sk

Jelenec (Hungarian: Gímes, formerly Ghymes) is a municipality and village in the Nitra District of the south-west of Slovakia, in the Nitra Region.

The village of Jelenec (also Gýmeš, Ghymes, Dymes and Gímes) lies below the southeastern spurs of the Tribeč mountain range at an altitude of 192 m above sea level. In terms of territorial and administrative division, it belongs to the Nitra Region and Nitra District. Its territory is built up of granitoid and sedimentary rocks (granites, quartzites, limestones, clays, sands). Some local minerals formed by hydrothermal mineralization are rare (e.g. ibaryte, lazulite, limonite and wad). Irregular seams of lignite coal, which are of variable quality, also occur in the Neogene sediments.

== Geography ==
The municipality lies at an altitude of 197 metres (646 ft) and covers an area of 27.18 km^{2} (10.49 sq mi) (2025).

== History ==
The first written mention of the village dates back to 1113, when the name of the village as Gimes appeared in the Zobor Documents of the Zobor Benedictine monastery. There are several theories about the origin of the village name, the most probable of which claims that it is formed from the word "gím" which means deer. According to a later transcription of a document from 1226, the Hungarian king Andrew II donated the village to Ivánek of the Hunt-Poznanov family. His son Andrew, who received the village in 1253 for saving Bela IV.'s life in the fight against the Tatars, had a castle built on Dúň hill.

== Population ==
Population statistic (10 years)
Year	1995	2005	2015	2025
Count	1919	1987	2100	2096
Difference		+3.54%	+5.68%	−0.19%

Population statistic
Year	2024	2025
Count	2104	2096
Difference		−0.38%

It has a population of 2096 people (31 December 2025).

=== Ethnicity ===
Census 2021 (1+ %)
Ethnicity	Number	Fraction
Slovak	1537	74.07%
Hungarian	495	23.85%
Not found out	133	6.4%
Total	2075	

In year 2021 was 2075 people by ethnicity 1537 as Slovak, 495 as Hungarian, 133 as Not found out, 8 as Czech, 6 as Other, 5 as Polish, 3 as Romani, 3 as Russian, 2 as Irish, 2 as Rusyn, 2 as German, 1 as Greek, 1 as Bulgarian and 1 as English.

Note on population: The difference values of population numbers in the table "Population statistic" and in the sections "Ethnicity" & "Religion" is caused by the use of various statistical methods.

=== Religion ===
Census 2021 (1+ %)
Religion	Number	Fraction
Roman Catholic Church	1603	77.25%
None	258	12.43%
Not found out	122	5.88%
Greek Catholic Church	33	1.59%
Total	2075	

In year 2021 was 2075 people by religion 1603 from Roman Catholic Church, 258 from None, 122 from Not found out, 33 from Greek Catholic Church, 14 from Ad hoc movements, 12 from Evangelical Church, 6 from Other and not ascertained christian church, 6 from Christian Congregations in Slovakia, 5 from Calvinist Church, 4 from Other, 3 from Paganism and natural spirituality, 3 from Jehovah's Witnesses, 3 from United Methodist Church, 2 from Islam and 1 from Apostolic Church.

== Places of Interest ==
=== Gýmeš Castle ===
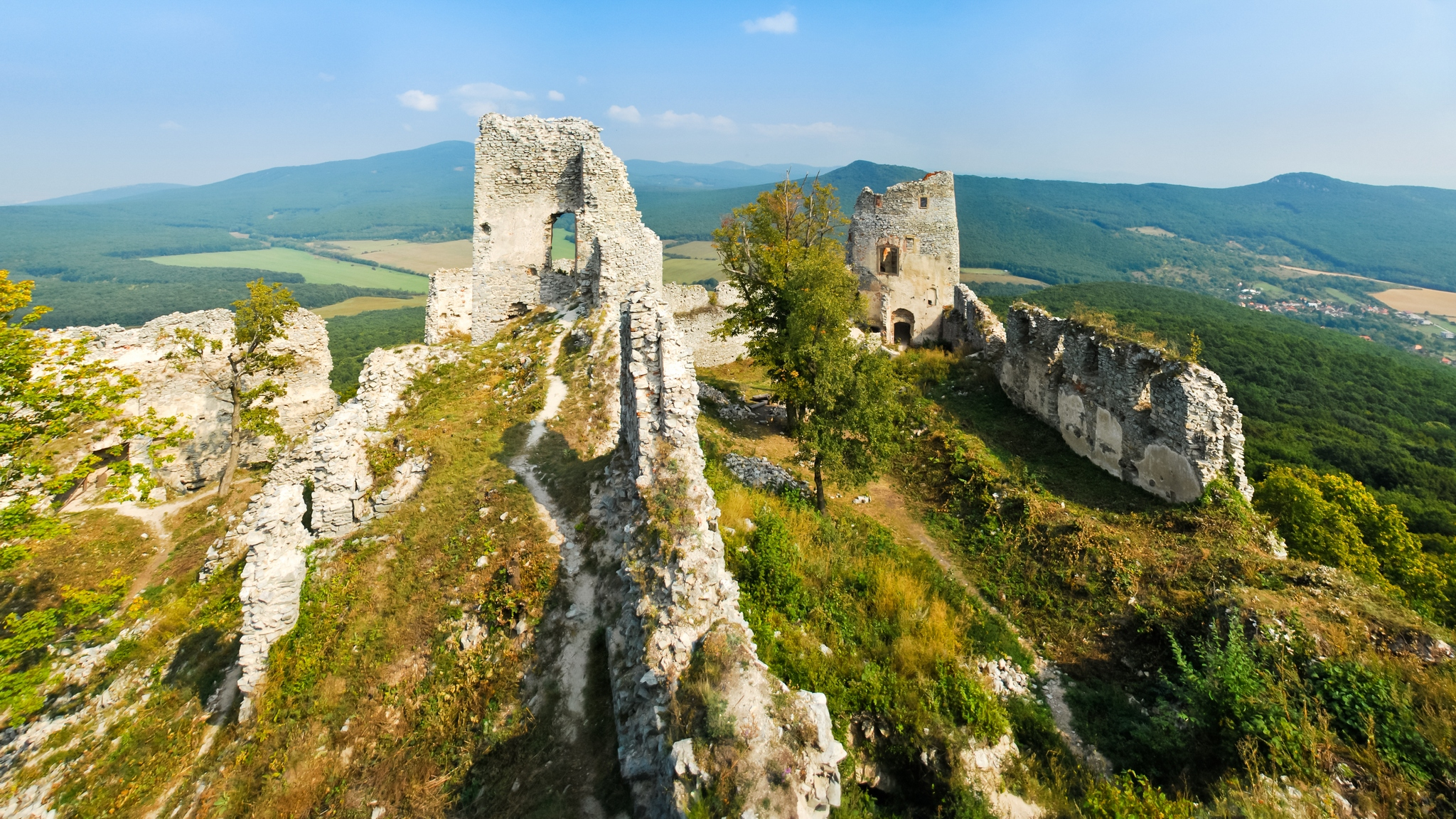
Gýmeš Castle.

Jelenec is known to be the home of Gýmeš Castle (Slovak: Gýmeš Hrad) also known as Jelenec Castle which are the ruins of a medieval castle located on the steep quartzite hill Dúň (514 m above sea level) on the southern slope of the Tribeč mountain range, approximately 5 km north of the village.

The ruin is a prominent landmark of the wide surroundings. Gýmeš is one of the ancestral castles of the noble Forgáč family – together with the Galician Castle. Despite the fact that the Turksconquered and caused damage to it, the structure was restored and occupied until 1865. Following that year, it fell into decay. Only a portion of the castle walls still remain intact.

=== Museum of the Forgách family ===
The Baroque mansion was built in 1722 by Bishop Pavol IV. Forgách. The Forgách family lived and stayed in it until the end of World War II. This noble family is quite important for Slovak history, which is why a permanent exhibition of the Forgách Family Museum was established in 2009. The museum presents a range of life stories of the Forgách family, who have appeared in Slovak history for more than eight centuries.

=== Jelenec Church ===
The church, which is still functional today, is located in the central part of the village. According to its location on the manuscript map of the 1st military survey from 1782-1784, it shows that the church originally formed a landmark in the northwestern part of the village.

== See also ==
- List of municipalities and towns in Slovakia

== Genealogical resources ==
The records for genealogical research are available at the state archive "Statny Archiv in Nitra, Slovakia"

- Roman Catholic church records (births/marriages/deaths): 1713-1901 (parish B)
- Lutheran church records (births/marriages/deaths): 1827-1894 (parish B)
