= Štiavnica Mountains =

Mountain range in Slovakia

Coordinates: 48°25′N 19°00′E

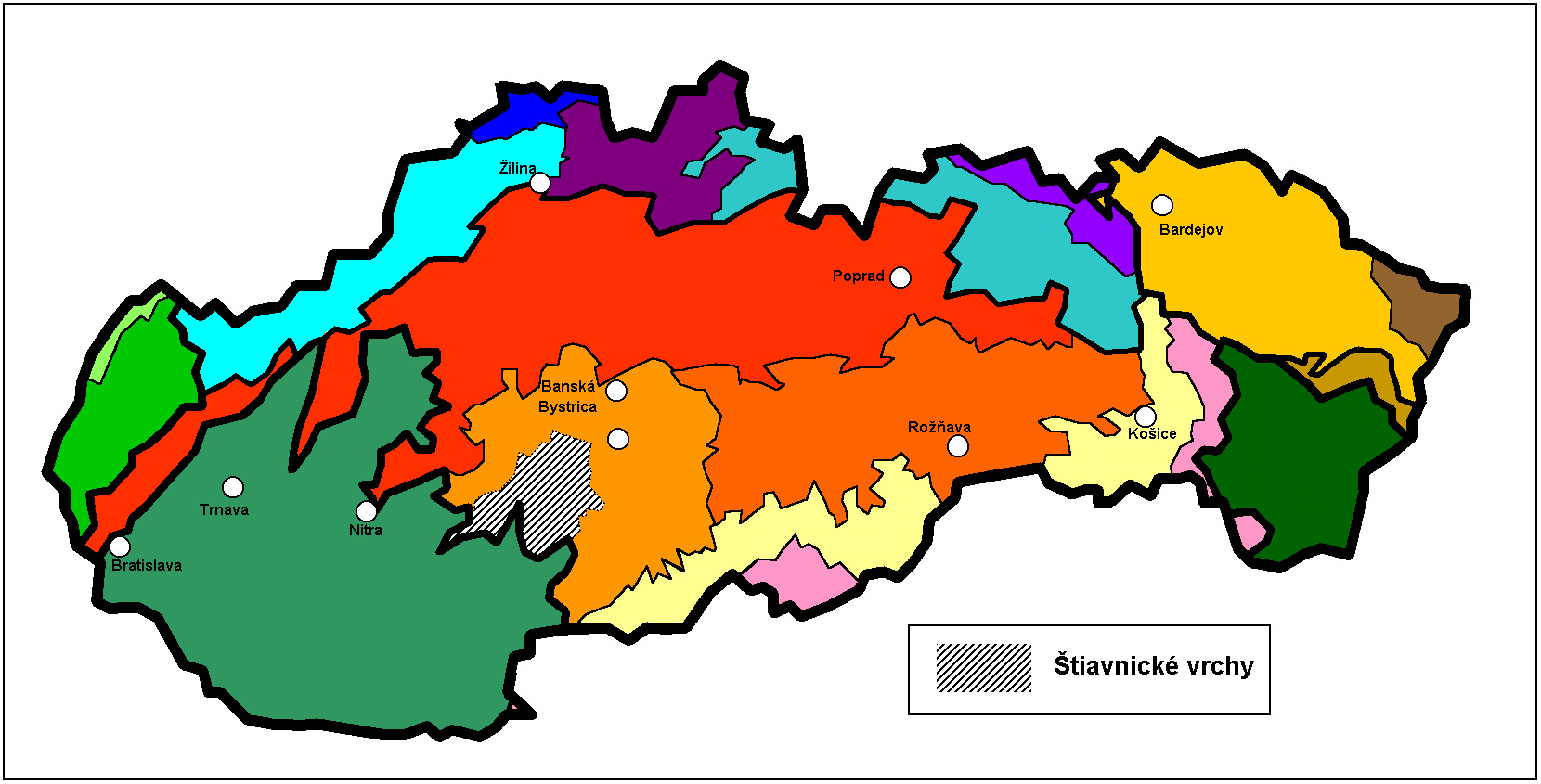
Location of Štiavnica Mountains in Slovakia (in gray)

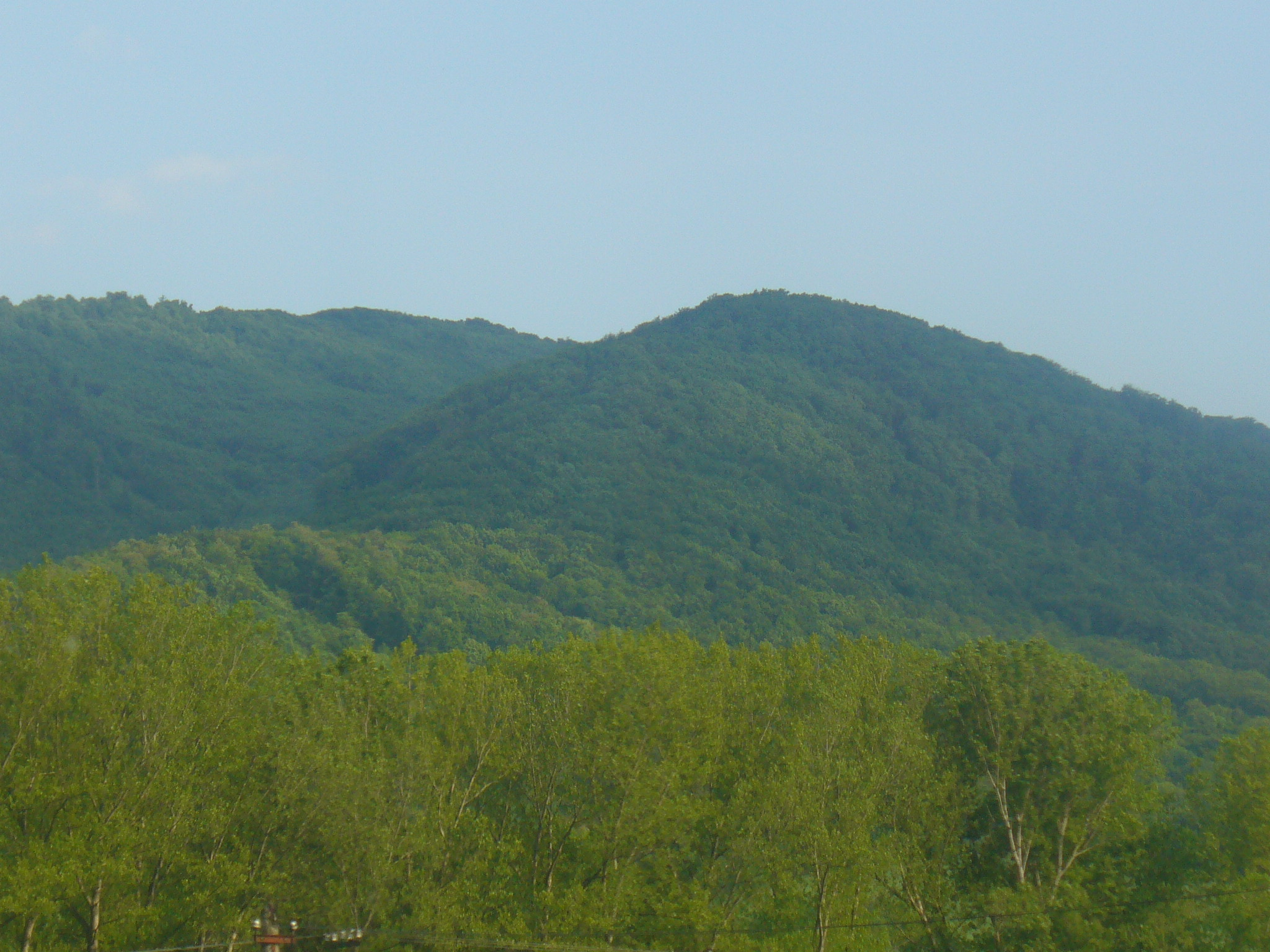
Štiavnica Mountains are mostly covered by forests

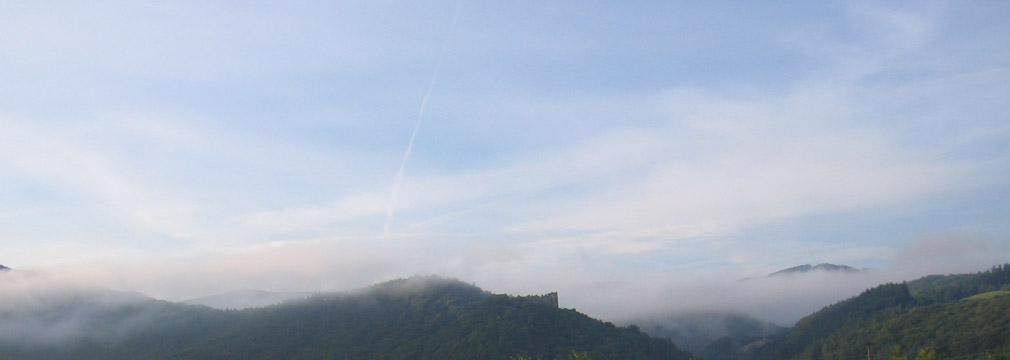
Šášov Castle in Štiavnica Mountains

The Štiavnica Mountains (also Štiavnické Mountains; Slovak: Štiavnické vrchy, pronounced [ˈʂcɪɐʋɲitskeː ˈʋr̩xi]) are a volcanic mountain range southern central Slovakia. They are part of Inner Western Carpathians and the Slovenské stredohorie Mountains. The area is protected by Štiavnica Mountains Protected Landscape Area.

They are bordered by the Kremnica Mountains (Kremnické vrchy) in the north, Pliešovce and Krupina basins (Krupinská kotlina) in the east, Danubian Hills (Podunajská pahorkatina) in the south and Pohronský Inovec, Vtáčnik and Žiar Basin (Žiarska kotlina) in the west. The highest point is Sitno (1,009 m).

Štiavnica Mountains are an immense caldera created by the collapse of an ancient volcano. Due to their volcanic origin, they are mineral-rich, with around 140 kinds of minerals. In the past, silver mining flourished in the area around the town of Banská Štiavnica.

From originally over 60 lakes called tajchy in Štiavnica Mountains, there are over 30 still existing today. Although they are now integrated in their natural environment, they were originally built as water reservoirs serving the mining industry, most of them in the 18th century.
