= Oponice Castle =

Historic site in Slovakia

- Oponice, Nitra Region, Slovakia
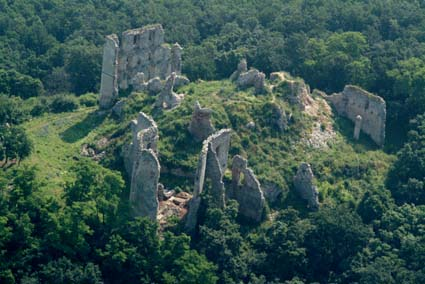
- Ariel view of the castle

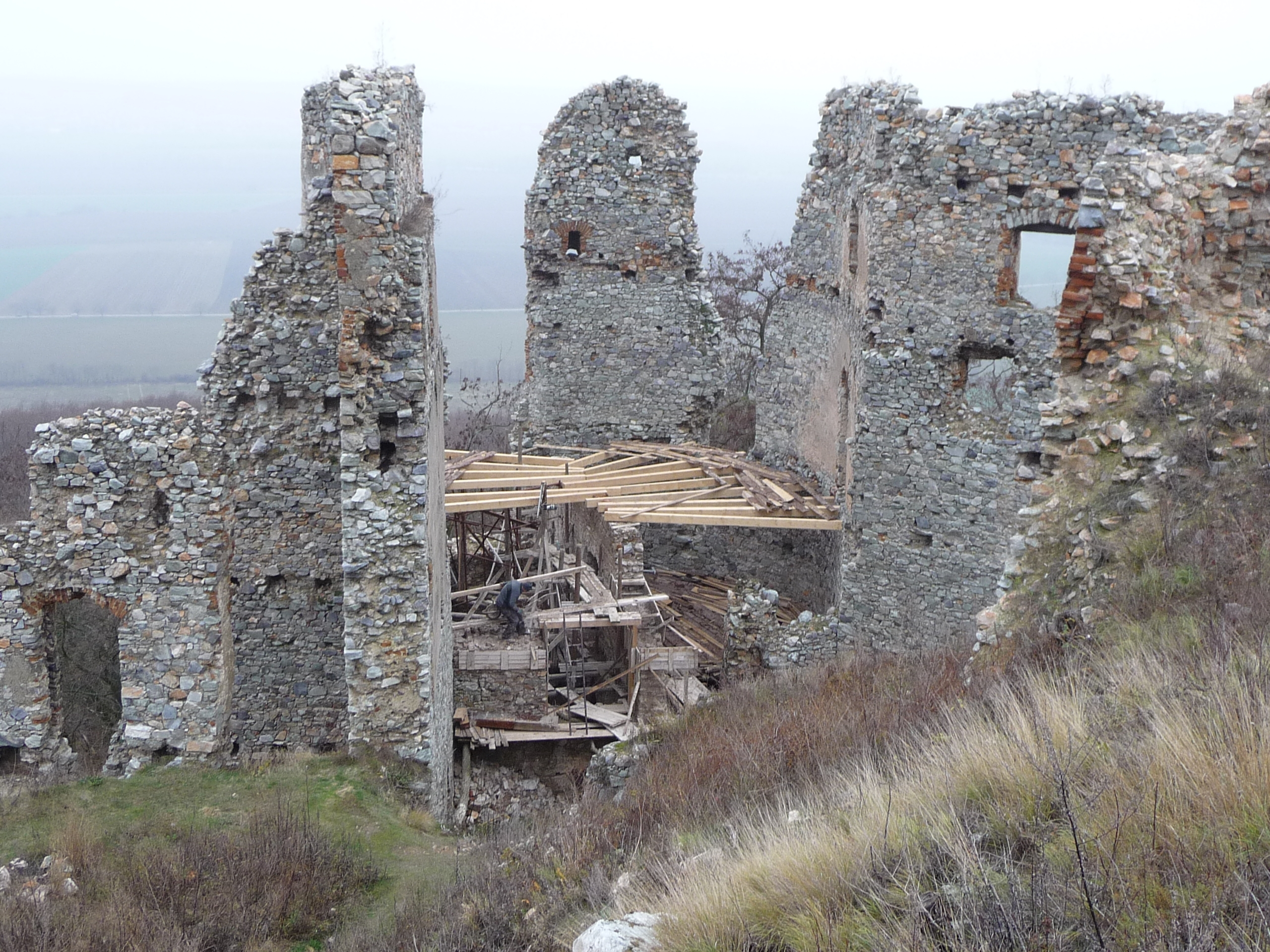
- Inside the walls

Site information
- Type: Castle

Location
- Coordinates: 48.448056°N 18.156667°E

Oponice Castle (Slovak: Oponický hrad or hrad Oponice) are the ruins of a castle located on the western spur of the Tribeč mountain range above the village of Oponice in Slovakia. The first written mention of the castle dates back to 1300. The Csák family is considered to be the founders and first owners of the castle. After the death of Matthew III Csák, Miklós Gutkeled became its owner in 1329, from 1389 it was owned by Dezider Kaplay and from 1392 it passed into the ownership of the founder of the Apponyi family, Miklós Cseklészi.

== History ==
The Oponice Castle has been mentioned in historical records since 1300, initially owned by Master Csák and managed by castellan Valentín. After Csák's death, it belonged to Matthew III Csák, and following his death in 1321, it was handed over to the royal army. In 1430, the castle was conquered and damaged by the Hussites, who would immediately repaired it. In the 14th century, King Sigismund stayed there, and it changed hands several times, including ownership by Nicholas of Čeklís and the Apponyi family, who expanded the estate. In the 15th century, the castle was occasionally raided, notably in 1514. During Turkish invasions, the castle was restored and rebuilt in the late Renaissance style, transforming the medieval structure into a more residential, fortified residence. It was damaged by fire in 1645 and later served as a military site before being destroyed, likely during Turkish raids or the Rákóczi uprising.

After World War II, the castle was well maintained until the 1960s, hosting events like Oponice Majalis, but over time it fell into disrepair, becoming overgrown with bushes and trees. In 2000, a group established the Apponiana Civic Association with the goal of preserving the castle as a regional landmark. Since then, they have cleared the overgrowth and worked to slow the castle's deterioration, including rebuilding the collapsed southwestern tower, "Tereš," a historically significant structure.

== Description ==
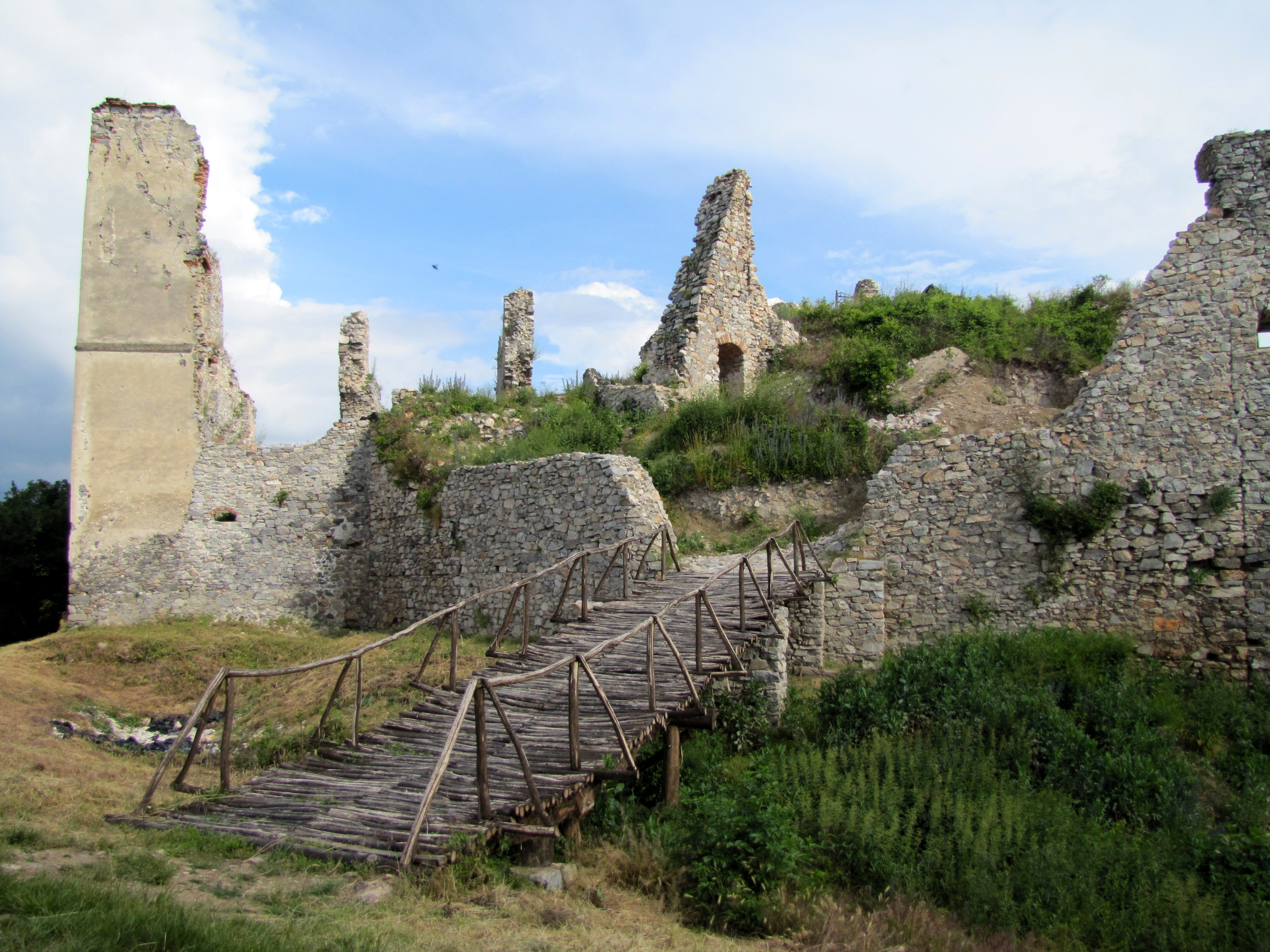
The bridge within the entrance to the castle

The castle's demise was contributed to by disputes over the property of the Apponyi family between two brothers, which had been dragging on since 1612. The owners left the castle in 1645 and moved to the lower grounds. The originally protruding highest tower from the small castle grounds has not been preserved. The perimeter wall, which surrounds the castle core, creates a forecourt in the form of a wider fence. The best preserved is its western part, a fortification with a massive corner bastion. The newest building is also clearly visible, the Aponiov Palace, built in the 16th century. The castle ruins are defined by bare perimeter walls around the castle courtyard. The large fortification tower and parts of the castle palace and farm buildings are recognizable.

== See also ==
- List of castles in Slovakia
