= Kremnica Mountains =

Mountain range in Slovakia

Coordinates: 48°40′N 19°00′E

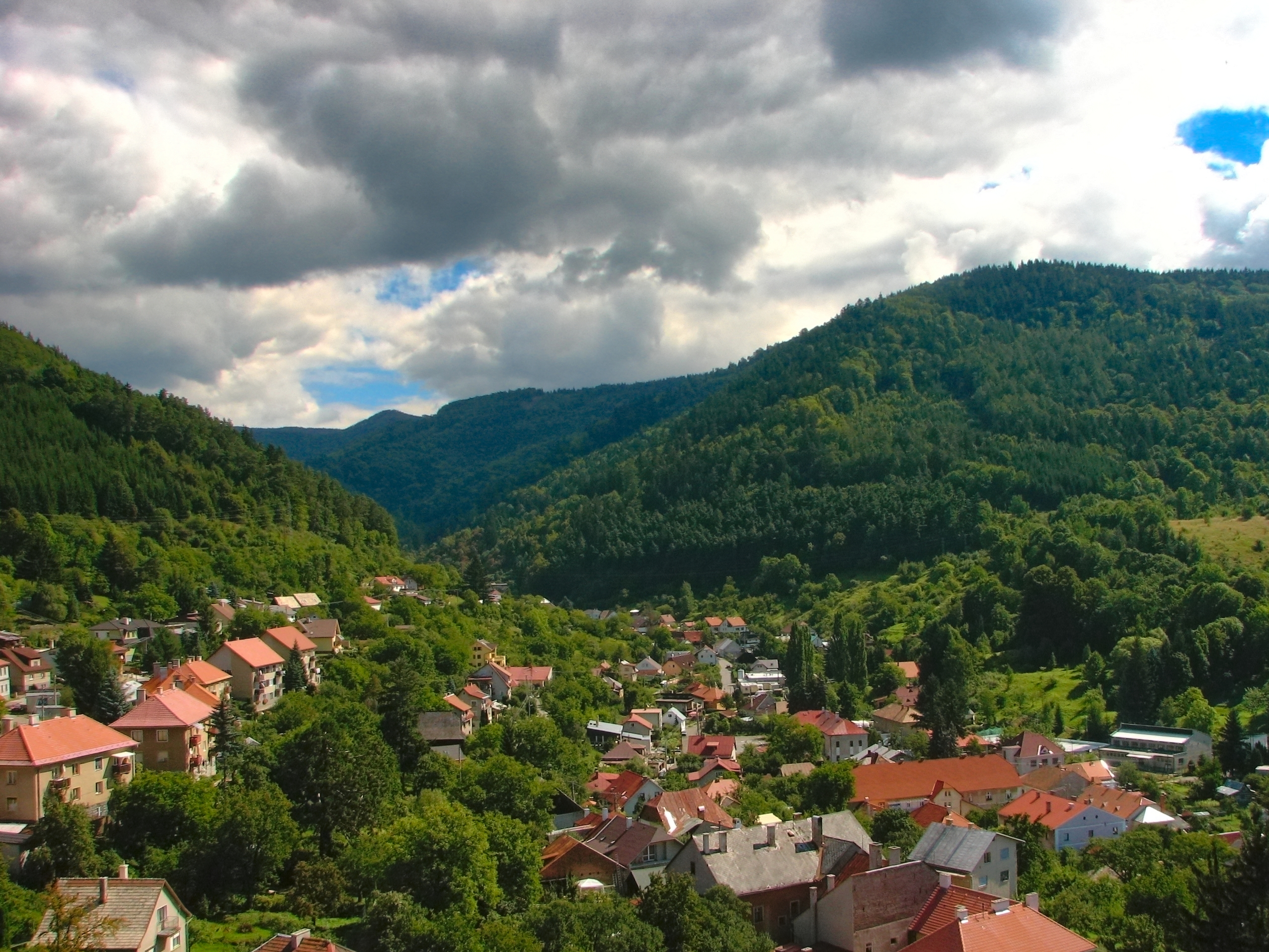
Kremnica Mountains from Kremnica

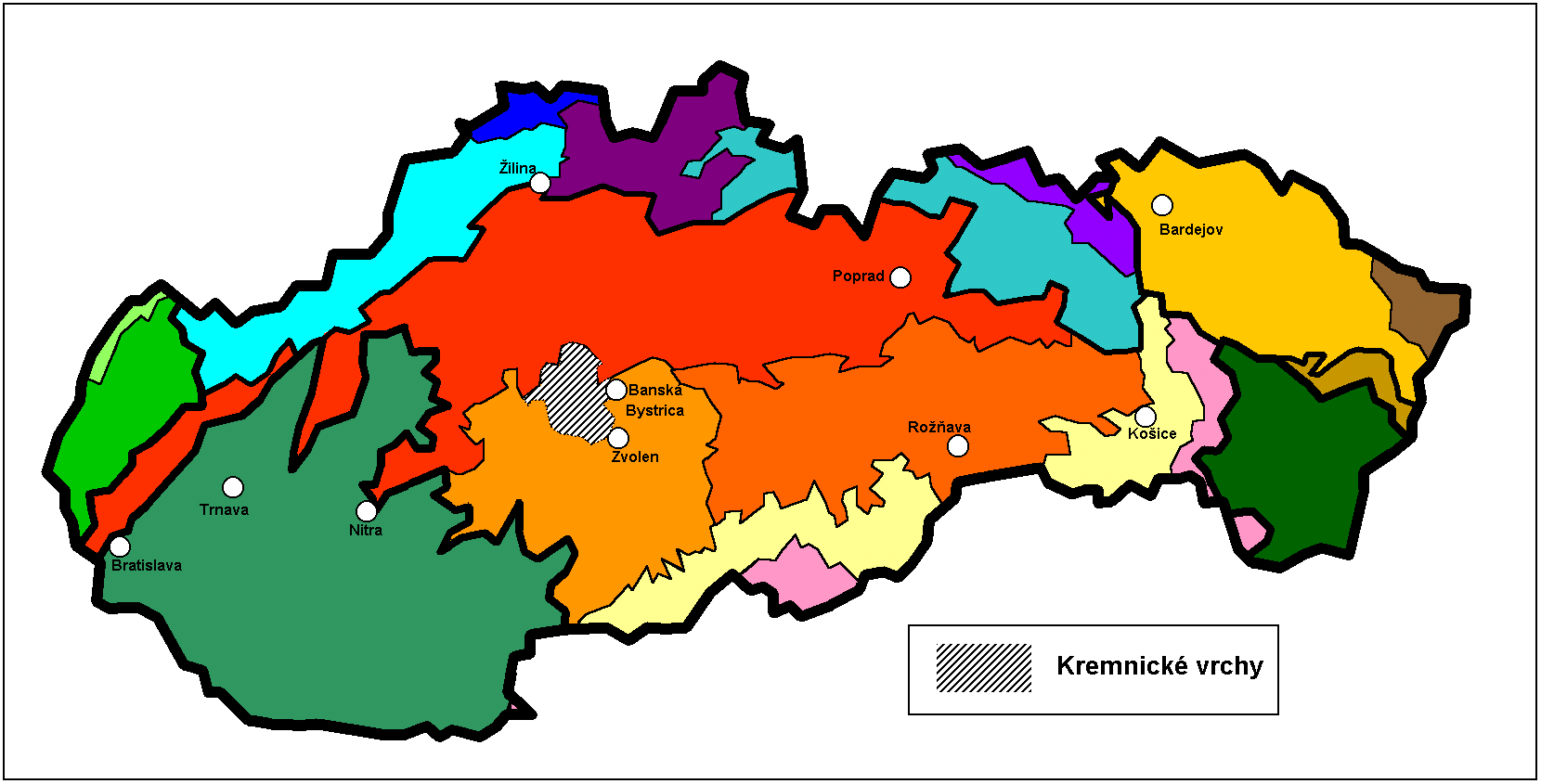
Location of Kremnica Mountains in Slovakia (in gray)

The Kremnica Mountains (Slovak: Kremnické vrchy, Hungarian: Körmöci-hegység, German: Kremnitzer Berge) are a volcanic mountain range in central Slovakia. They are part of the Western Carpathians and the Slovenské stredohorie Mts.

The mountain range is situated east of the town of Kremnica, which gave it its name. It is bordered by Veľká Fatra and Turiec Basin in the north, Zvolen Basin in the east, Žiar Basin and Štiavnica Mountains in the south, and Vtáčnik in the west. The highest mountain is Flochová at 1,317 m.

The Kremnica Mountains are divided into five subdivisions:

1. Kunešovská hornatina (northwest)
2. Jastrabská vrchovina (southwest)
3. Flochovský chrbát (central part and north)
4. Turovské predhorie (south)
5. Malachovské predhorie (east)
