= Tribeč =

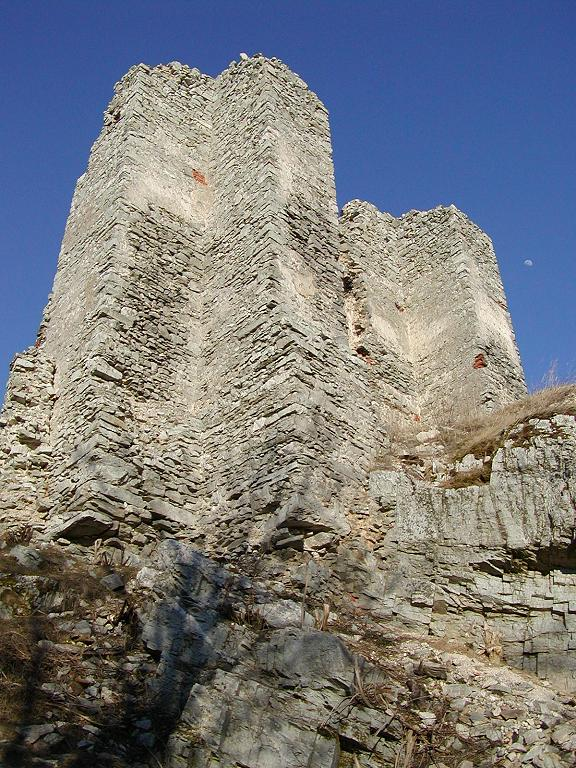
- Gýmeš Castle

Highest point
- Peak: Veľký Tribeč
- Elevation: 829.6 m (2,722 ft)
- Coordinates: 48°30′N 18°20′E

Geography
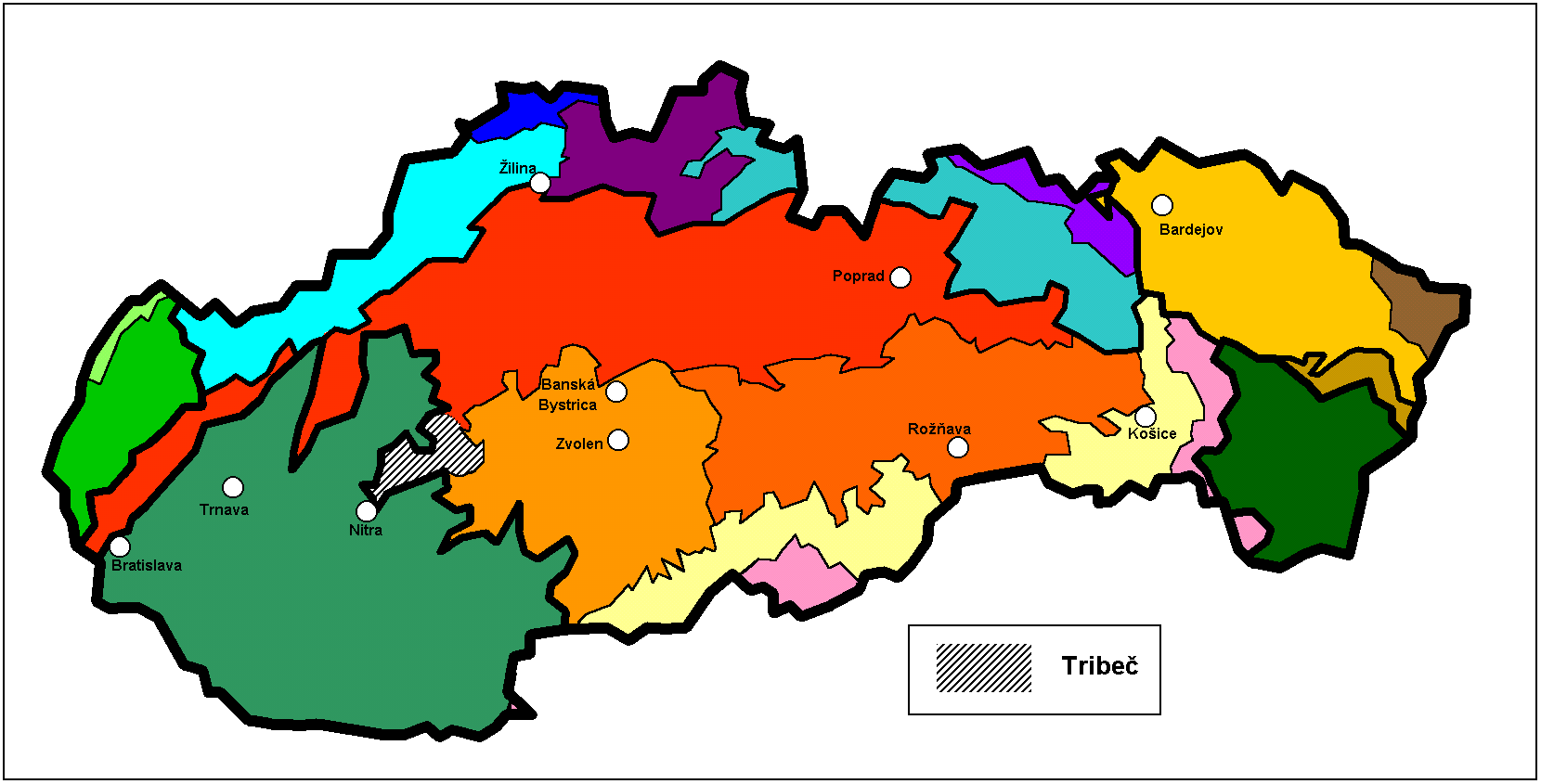
- Country: Slovakia
- Regions: Nitra and Trenčín
- City: Nitra
- Parent range: Fatra-Tatra Area
- Borders on: Pohronský Inovec and Vtáčnik Mountains

Tribeč (Hungarian: Tribecs-hegység) is a crystalline mountain range in western Slovakia, in the Inner Western Carpathians located in the Nitra Region. It is surrounded by the Danubian Lowland, Pohronský Inovec, Vtáčnik Mountains and the Upper Nitra Basin. Beech trees are predominant in the area. The highest mountain is Veľký Tribeč at 829.6 m (2,722 ft). The area belongs to the Ponitrie Protected Landscape Area.

== Landscape ==
The Tribeč mountain range is 50 km (31 mi) in length and about 18 km (11 mi) in width, which places it as the 50th largest series of mountains in Slovakia. It is surrounded by Zlaté Moravce, Topoľčany, Partizánske and Nitra, giving it a rectangular shape. Tribeč is also part of a larger belt of core mountains; The Fatra-Tatra Area. In the east, it connects to Pohronský Inovec and Vtáčnik, and descends into the Hornonitrian basin.

== Disappearances ==
Since the popular Slovak bestseller book Trhlina and its follow-up film adaptation with the same name (The Rift), Tribeč became associated with conspiracies. Some are calling it the Bermuda Triangle of Slovakia.

The history of these strange disappearances dates back to the 18th and 19th century, when the first known legend was written.

== Structures ==
- Gýmeš Castle
- Oponice Castle
