= Štiavnické vrchy Protected Landscape Area =

Protected area in Slovakia

Štiavnické vrchy Protected Landscape Area CHKO Štiavnické vrchy
- IUCN category V (protected landscape/seascape)
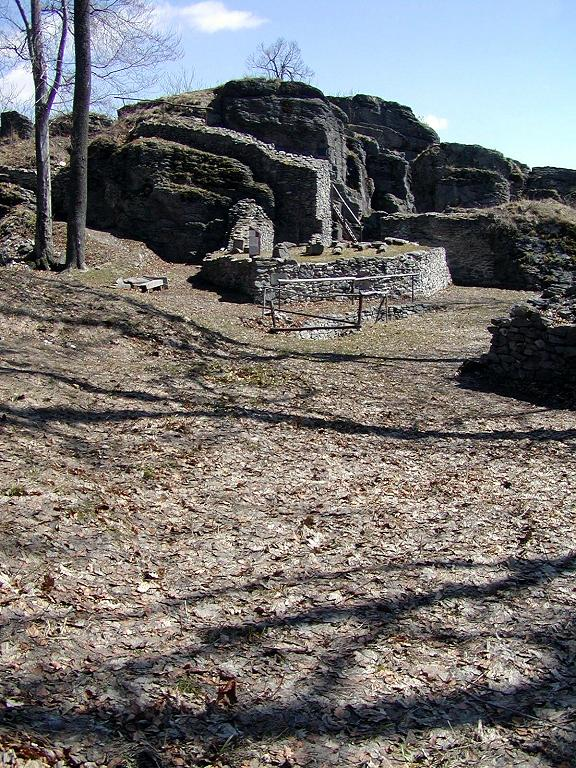
- Sitno Castle
- Interactive map of Štiavnické vrchy Protected Landscape Area; CHKO Štiavnické vrchy
- Location: Southern central Slovakia
- Coordinates: 48°32′N 18°58′E
- Area: 776.30 km^{2} (299.73 sq mi)(299.7 mi^{2})
- Established: 22 September 1979
- Governing body: Správa CHKO Štiavnické vrchy (Štiavnické vrchy PLA administration) in Banská Štiavnica

Štiavnické vrchy Protected Landscape Area (Slovak: Chránená krajinná oblasť Štiavnické vrchy) is one of the 14 protected landscape areas in Slovakia. It is situated in the Banská Štiavnica, Zvolen, Žiar nad Hronom, Žarnovica, Levice and Krupina districts.

== History ==
The park was created on 22 September 1979. Protected areas declared before include Banskoštiavnická botanická záhrada (Banská Štiavnica Botanical Garden) (1958), Kamenné more near Vyhne (1923), and Sitno (1951).

== Geography, geology and biology ==
The PLA's territory is set in the Štiavnické vrchy range, which is a range of volcanic origin and is the biggest one in Slovakia. Beech, oak and fir trees grow in the area. The park protects the natural elements as well as the monuments associated with historic mining activities. Artificial water reservoirs called tajchy were built in the 17th and 18th centuries to provide energy for the mines in Banská Štiavnica; at their height, there were 60 of them. Twenty-four survived to the 21st century and are used for recreation. Along with the town, they are a UNESCO World Heritage Site.
