= East Carpathians Protected Landscape Area =

Protected landscape area in Slovakia

Eastern Carpathians Protected Landscape Area CHKO Východné Karpaty
- IUCN category V (protected landscape/seascape)
- Interactive map of Eastern Carpathians Protected Landscape Area; CHKO Východné Karpaty
- Location: North-eastern Slovakia, Low Beskids
- Coordinates: 49°20′N 21°55′E
- Area: 253.07 km^{2} (97.71 sq mi)
- Established: 7 September 1977
- Governing body: Správa CHKO Východné Karpaty (CHKO Východné Karpaty Administration) in Humenné

East Carpathians Protected Landscape Area (Slovak: Chránená krajinná oblasť Východné Karpaty) is a protected landscape area in north-eastern Slovakia, in the Prešov Region, in the Carpathian Mountains. The PLA occupies a slice of land along with the border with Poland. The park was first created in 1977, when it was originally larger than today, occupying area of 968.1 km^{2} (373.8 sq mi) until 1997, when the Poloniny National Park was created in the eastern part, reducing the area into 253.07 km^{2} (97.7 sq mi).

== Biology ==
Beech forests are dominant in the park, with the corresponding plant and animal associations. Original growth forests constitute an ideal environment for protected or threatened species, such as the gray wolf, lynx, bear, otter and others.
