= Biele Karpaty Protected Landscape Area =

Protected landscape area of Slovakia

White Carpathians Protected Landscape Area, Chránená krajinná oblasť Biele Karpaty
- IUCN category V (protected landscape/seascape)
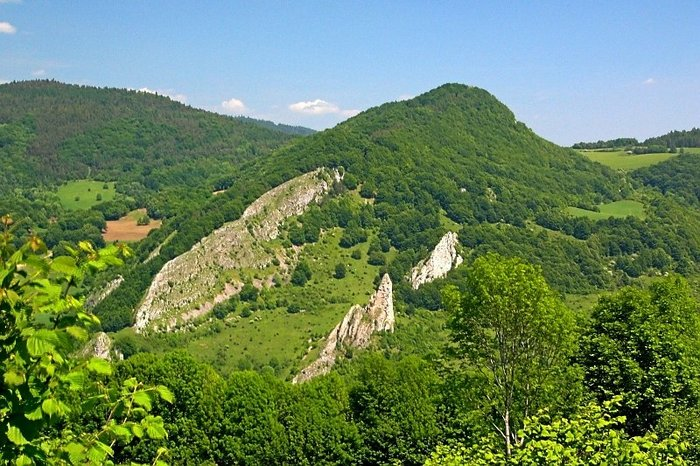
- Červenokamenské bradlo cliff near the village of Červený Kameň

- Location within Slovakia
- Location: West Slovakia, White Carpathians
- Coordinates: 48°57′09″N 17°56′33″E
- Area: 445.7 km^{2} (172.1 sq mi)
- Established: 12 July 1979
- Governing body: Správa CHKO Biele Karpaty (CHKO Biele Karpaty administration)

White Carpathians Protected Landscape Area (Slovak: Chránená krajinná oblasť Biele Karpaty) is one of the 14 protected landscape areas in Slovakia. The Landscape Area protects the Slovak part of the White Carpathians, part of the Slovak-Moravian Carpathians in West Slovakia. The area stretches from Skalica District in the south west to the Púchov District in the north east, copying the border between Slovakia and the Czech Republic and is about 80 km (50 mi) long. It belongs to the western-most part of the Carpathian Mountains.

White Carpathians PLA was founded on 12 July 1979, and the law was amended on 28 August 2003.

== Biology and ecology ==
Forests cover 299.8 km^{2} (115.8 sq mi), (67.26%) of the area. The most widespread genera of trees are beech, linden and ash. Other plants include orchids, for example Dactylorhiza fuchsii subsp. sooiana and Ophrys holubyana. Private fields are often home to endangered species, such as corncockle (Agrostemma githago), corn buttercup (Ranunculus arvensis) and Nigella arvensis.

Animals are represented by the European mantis, Rosalia longicorn, Lucanus cervus, mountain Apollo, great crested newt, black stork, saker falcon, Eurasian eagle-owl, Eurasian lynx, and European wildcat.

== See also ==
- Protected areas of Slovakia
