= Gýmeš Castle =

Historical site in Slovakia

Coordinates: 48°24′42″N 18°13′20″E

- Gýmeš Hrad
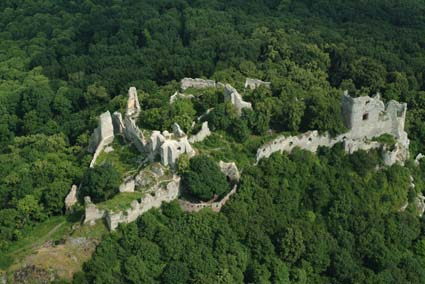

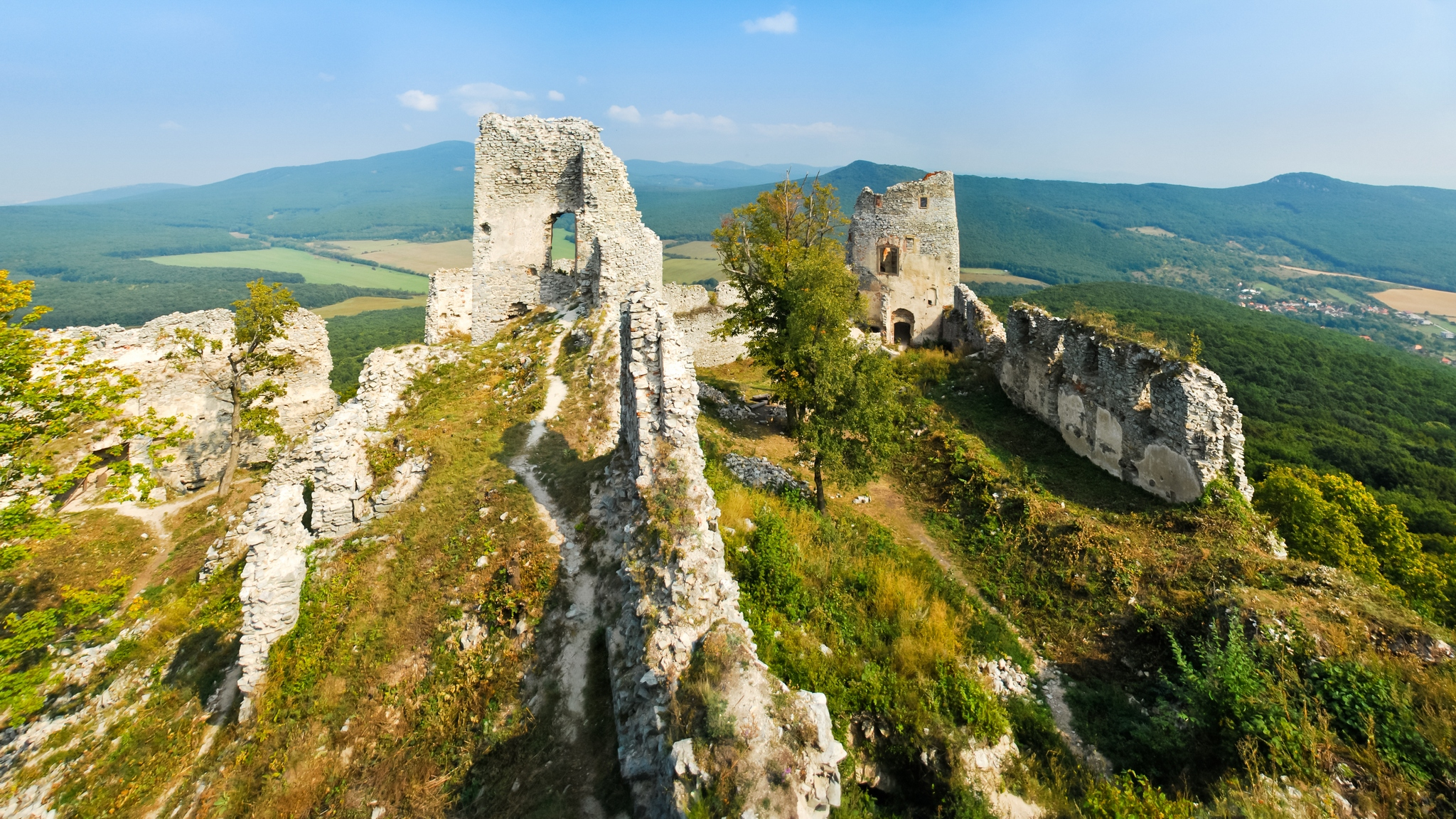

Site information
- Type: Castle
- Open to the public: Yes

Site history
- Built: 13th century
- Materials: Stone

Gýmeš Castle (Slovak: Gýmeš Hrad) also known as Jelenec Castle are the ruins of a medieval castle on the steep quartzite hill Dúň (514 m above sea level) on the southern slope of the Tribeč mountain range, about 5 km north of the village of Jelenec (Gýmeš).

The ruin is a prominent landmark of the wide surroundings. Gýmeš is one of the ancestral castles of the noble Forgách family – together with the Galician Castle. Despite the fact that the Turks conquered and caused damage to it, the structure was restored and occupied until 1865. Following that year, it fell into decay. Only a portion of the castle walls still remain intact.

== History ==
The castle was constructed in the mid-13th century, shortly after the end of the Mongol invasion in 1242. It was established on the foundation laid by Andrew, the son of Ivanek, who was part of the Hont-Pázmány family and the progenitor of the noble Forgách family. The castle proved to be formidable, successfully repelling the forces of King Ottokar II of Bohemia on two occasions, in 1271 and 1273. By the late 13th century, the Forgách family had expanded significantly, necessitating the enlargement of the castle. This expansion, which involved the building of a new structure adjacent to the original castle, was undertaken by Thomas, one of Andrew's sons.

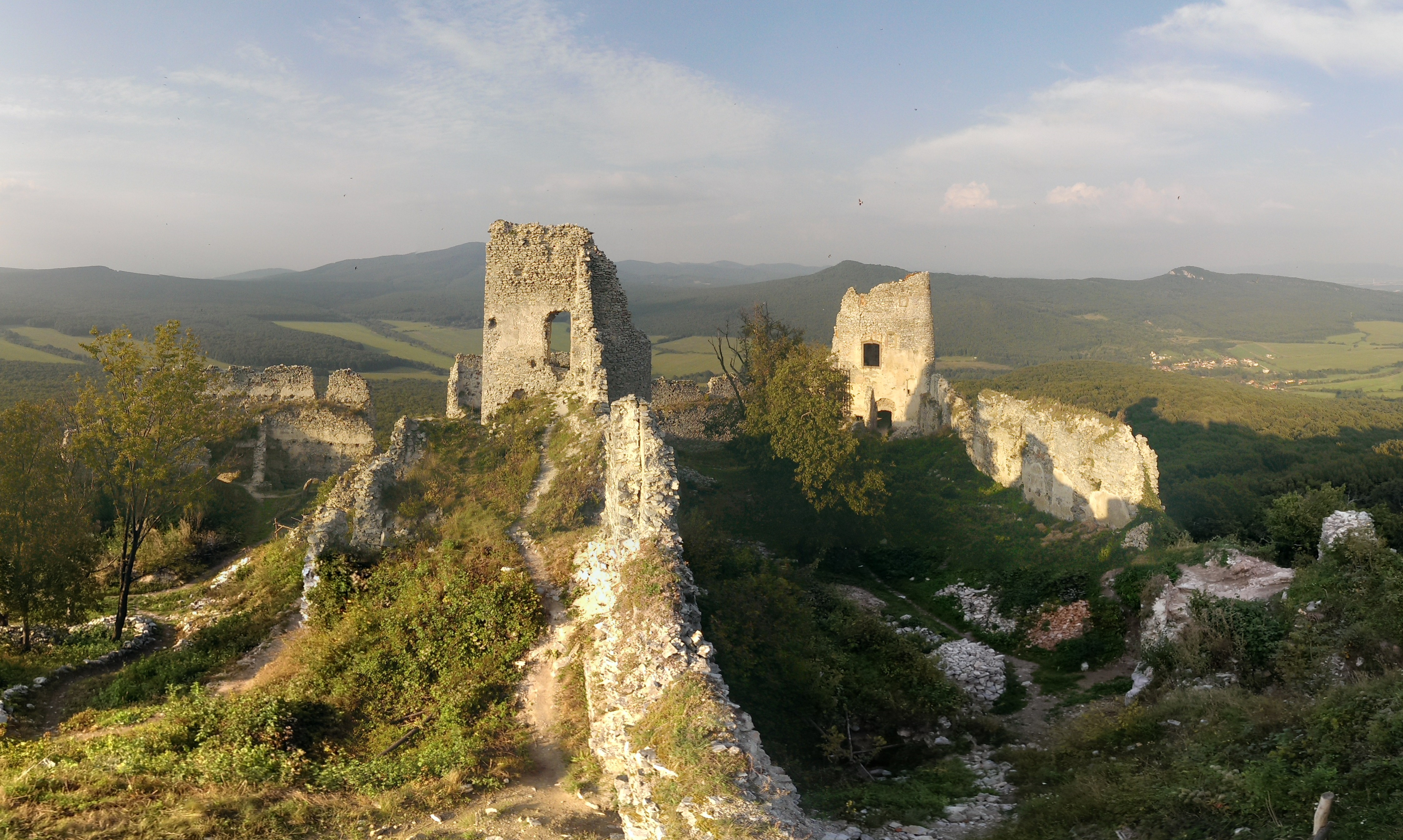
Behind the ruins is the village of Jelenec.

At the start of the fourteenth century, the castle was seized and held by the forces of the Hungarian noble, Matthew III Csák, who ruled the western region of what is now Slovakia. Following his demise in 1321, Gýmeš was captured by the royal army and subsequently returned to the Forgách family. The castle remained in the hands of their descendants, who oversaw its gradual expansion during the 14th and 15th centuries.

In 1576, Gýmeš was taken over and destroyed by the Turks. During its reconstruction, a southern ward was established, and around 1613, the castle was modified for fire defense, incorporating bastion fortifications. Nevertheless, in 1619, it faced another invasion and destruction, this time by the army of Gábor Bethlen, the prince of Transylvania. Following this incident, the Forgách family undertook the rebuilding of the castle, and despite ongoing Turkish assaults and invasions in 1663 and 1671, they expanded the structure. The significant baroque reconstruction of the castle was primarily carried out by Paul IV Forgacs and his son Paul V between 1713 and 1755. The Forgách resided in Gýmeš until the early 19th century. By that time, the castle had become so dilapidated and damaged that the family chose to abandon it.

== Architecture ==
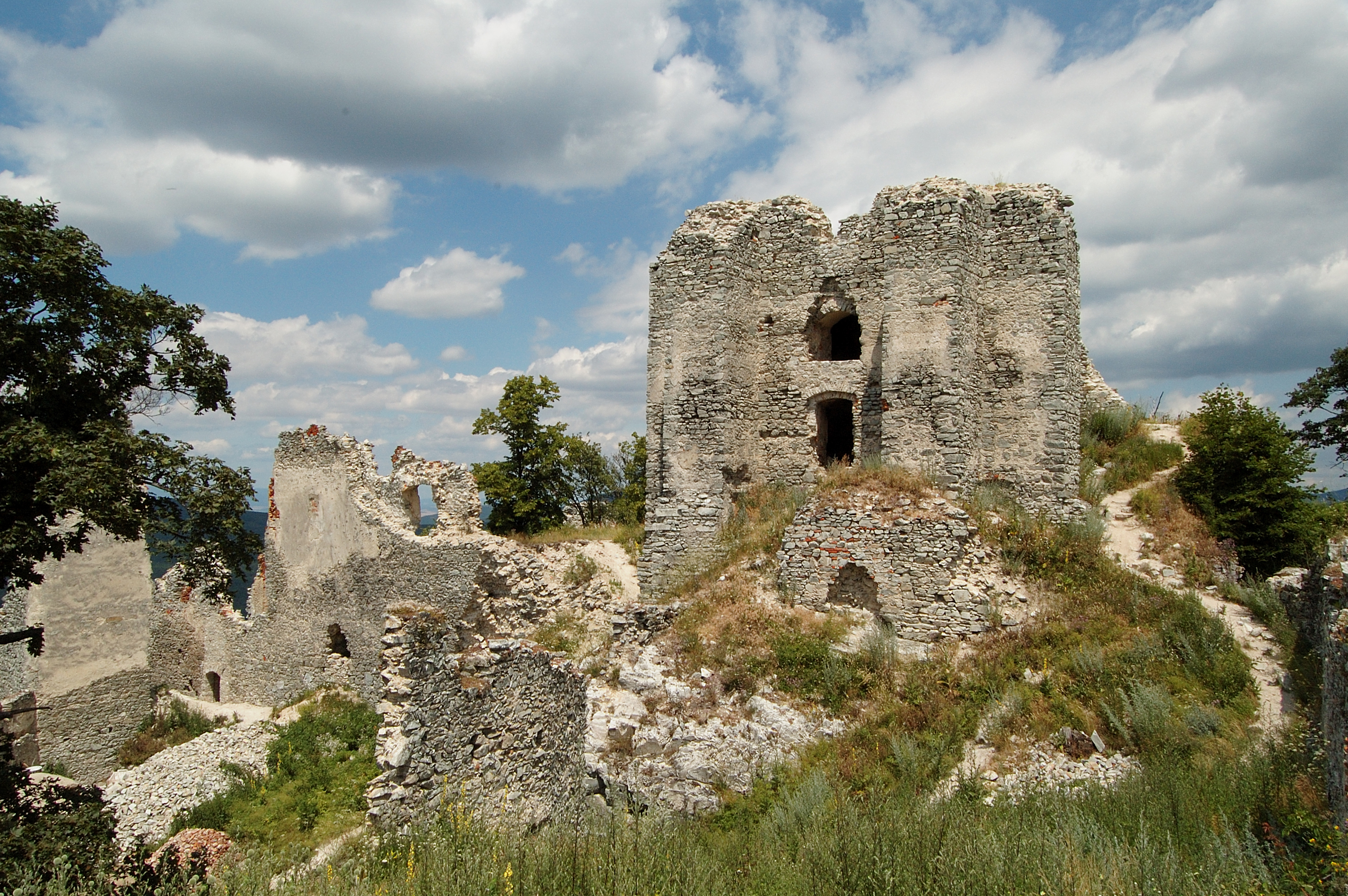
The ruins in 2014.

The castle was securely fortified and featured a prismatic tower that appeared to be residential, alongside a second tower shaped like a horseshoe that safeguarded the access road. The palace was situated between these two structures. Enclosing the entire triangular courtyard of the upper castle, which included a cistern, was a wall with a gate. Subsequently, a palace with a rectangular layout, located on a distinct rock outcrop, is recorded. This palace was linked to the main castle, forming an eastern forecourt. By the conclusion of the Middle Ages, a new tower-like palace was constructed in the eastern forecourt, which was connected to the older structure.

The castle was expanded to the southwest, incorporating a forecourt with agricultural buildings. A bastion provided protection for the new entrance gate. The eastern forecourt was enhanced with a new fortification that included an entrance tower. Following the castle's restoration, the Forgách family erected a cannon bastion. In several areas, the window openings and entrances have preserved their stone borders. The architectural style of the chapel is primarily discernible through the division of the walls with double pilasters and profiled cornices, which once supported the vault of the space.

== See also ==
- List of castles in Slovakia
