= Vtáčnik Mountains =

Mountain range in Slovakia

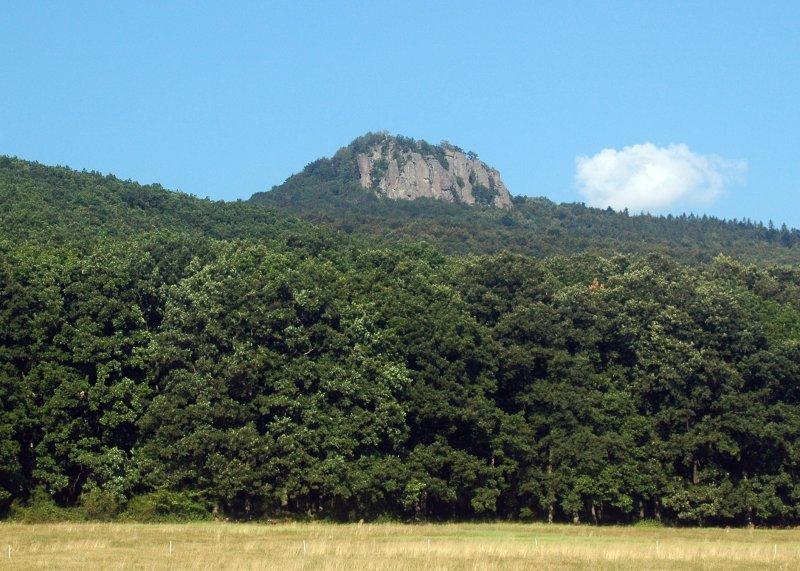
- Mount Žarnov

Highest point
- Peak: Vtáčnik (1,346 m)

Naming
- Native name: Pohorie Vtáčnik (Slovak)

Geography
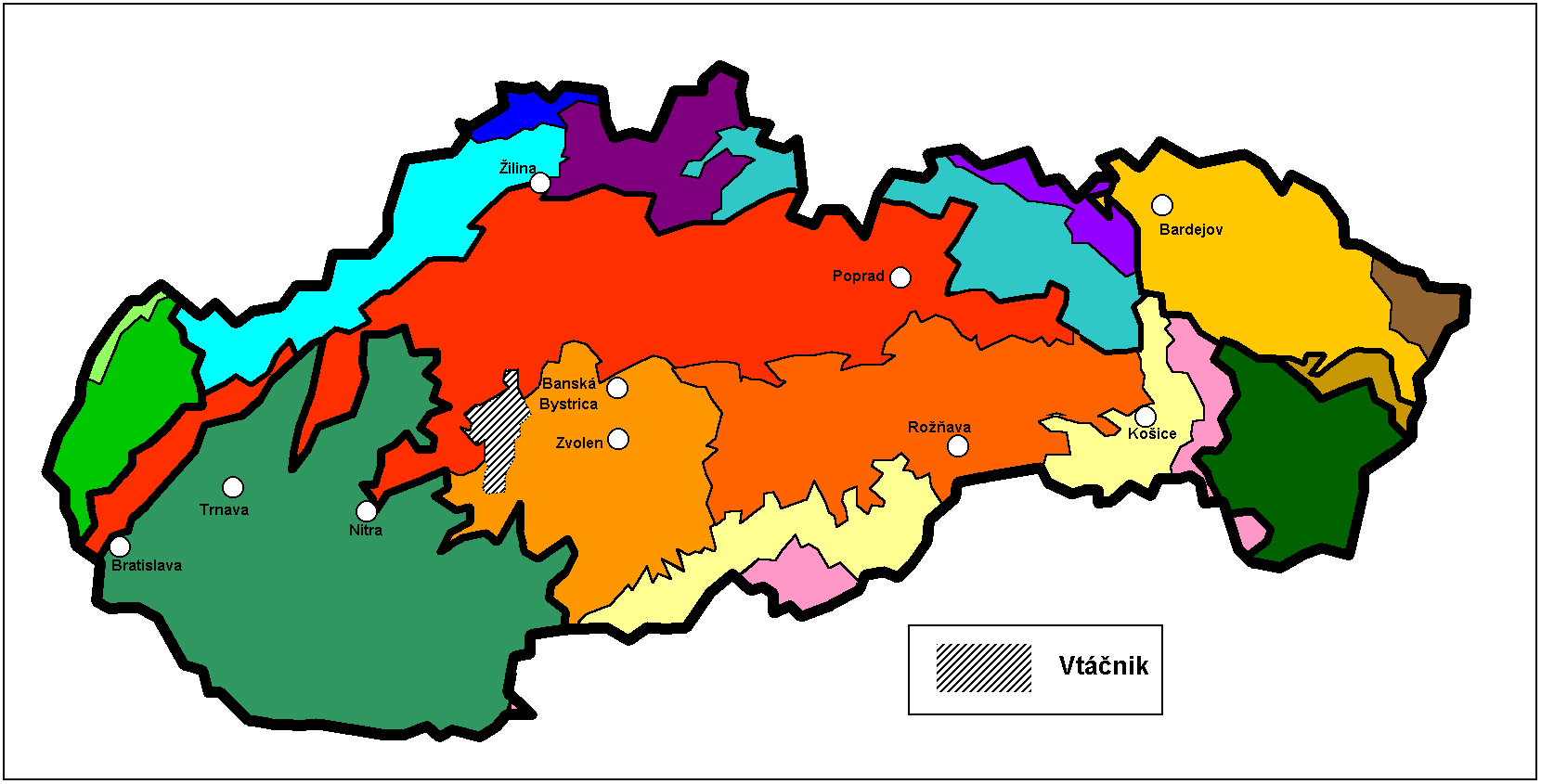
- Vtáčnik in Slovakia (gray)
- Country: Slovakia
- Regions: Trenčín and Banská Bystrica
- Districts: Prievidza, Partizánske, Žarnovica and Žiar nad Hronom
- Geomorphological units: Vysoký Vtáčnik, Nízky Vtáčnik, Župkovská brázda and Raj
- Range coordinates: 48°35′N 18°35′E
- Parent range: Slovak Central Mountains
- Borders on: Strážov Mountains, Žiar, Kremnica Mountains, Tribeč and Štiavnica Mountains

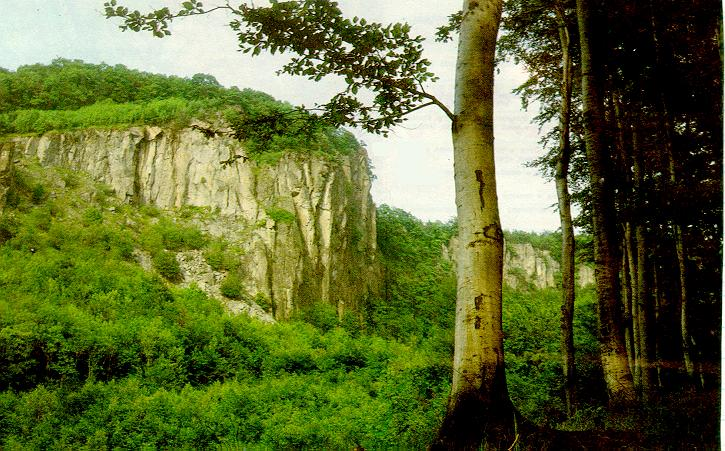
The highest mountain of Vtáčnik

The Vtáčnik Mountains (Slovak: Pohorie Vtáčnik) are a mountain range in central Slovakia, which forms part of the Slovak Central Mountains (Slovenské stredohorie) within the Inner Western Carpathians.

It is bordered in the west, north and northeast by the upper Nitra basin, Strážov Mountains and Žiar, in the east by the Kremnica Mountains and Žiar basin, and in the south by Tribeč and the Štiavnica Mountains.

It is divided further into these geomorphological units:

1. Vysoký Vtáčnik ("High Vtáčnik")
2. Nízky Vtáčnik ("Low Vtáčnik")
3. Župkovská brázda ("Župkov Furrow")
4. Raj ("Paradise Mountains")

The four highest mountains are: Vtáčnik (1,346 m), Biela skala (1,136 m), Buchlov (1,040 m), and Žiar (845 m).

Some of the towns or villages around or in Vtáčnik include: Prievidza, Nováky, Handlová, Prochot, Lehota pod Vtáčnikom, and Veľké Pole.
