= Okšov oaks =

Protected area in Slovakia

Coordinates: 48.709977°N 18.089674°E

Okšov Oaks
- IUCN category III (natural monument or feature)
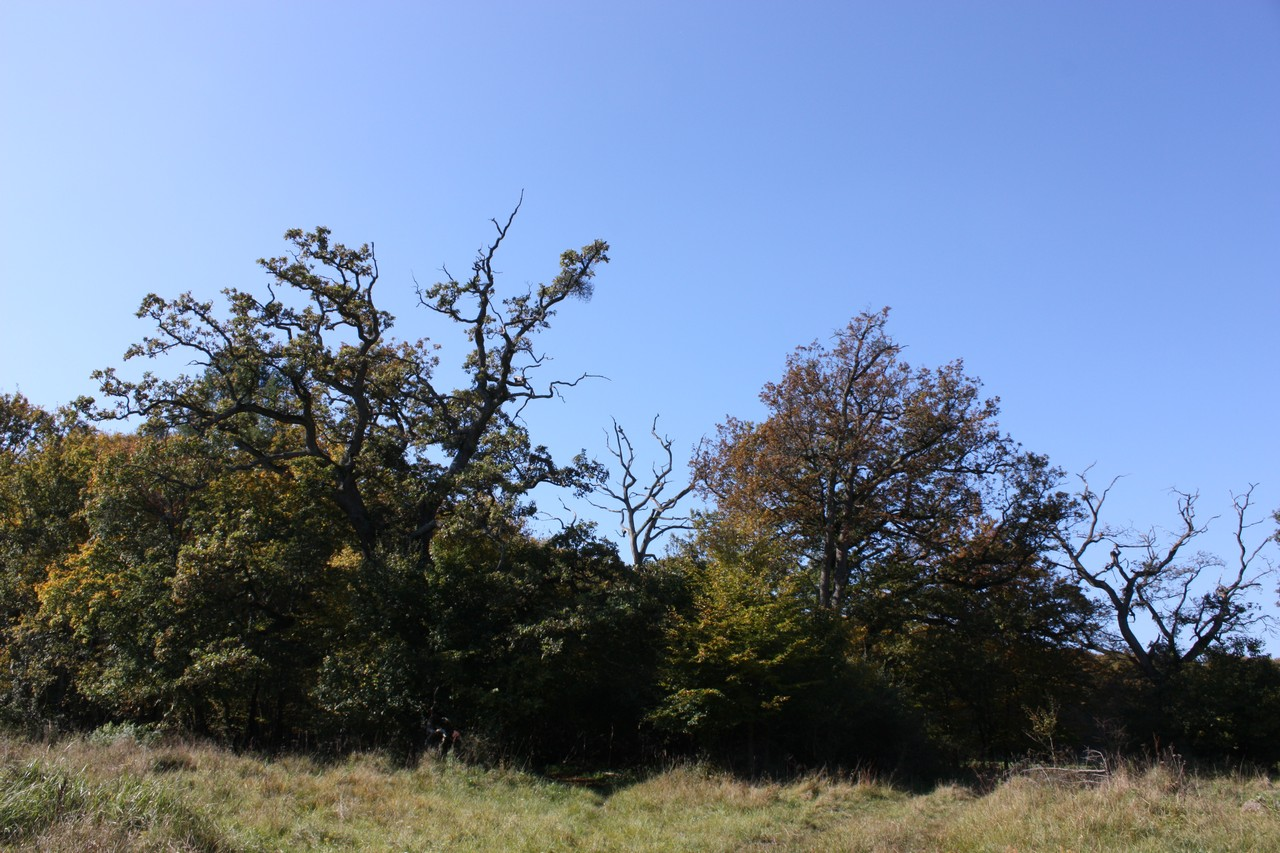
- Okšov Oaks
- Interactive map of Okšov Oaks
- Area: 0.015 km^{2} (0.0058 sq mi)
- Established: 1984
- Governing body: ŠOP - S-CHKO Ponitrie

Okšov Oaks is a protected site within the village of Zlatníky, Trenčín Region, Slovakia. The nature reserve covers an area of 1.53 ha in the Povazsky Inovec mountains. It has a protection level of 4 under the Slovak nature protection system.

== Description ==
The area was protected to preserve stands of oaks growing as solitary trees or in groups. These trees are remarkable because of their age, monumental growth and aesthetic appearance. The site is used for scientific research and educational purposes.

== Gallery ==
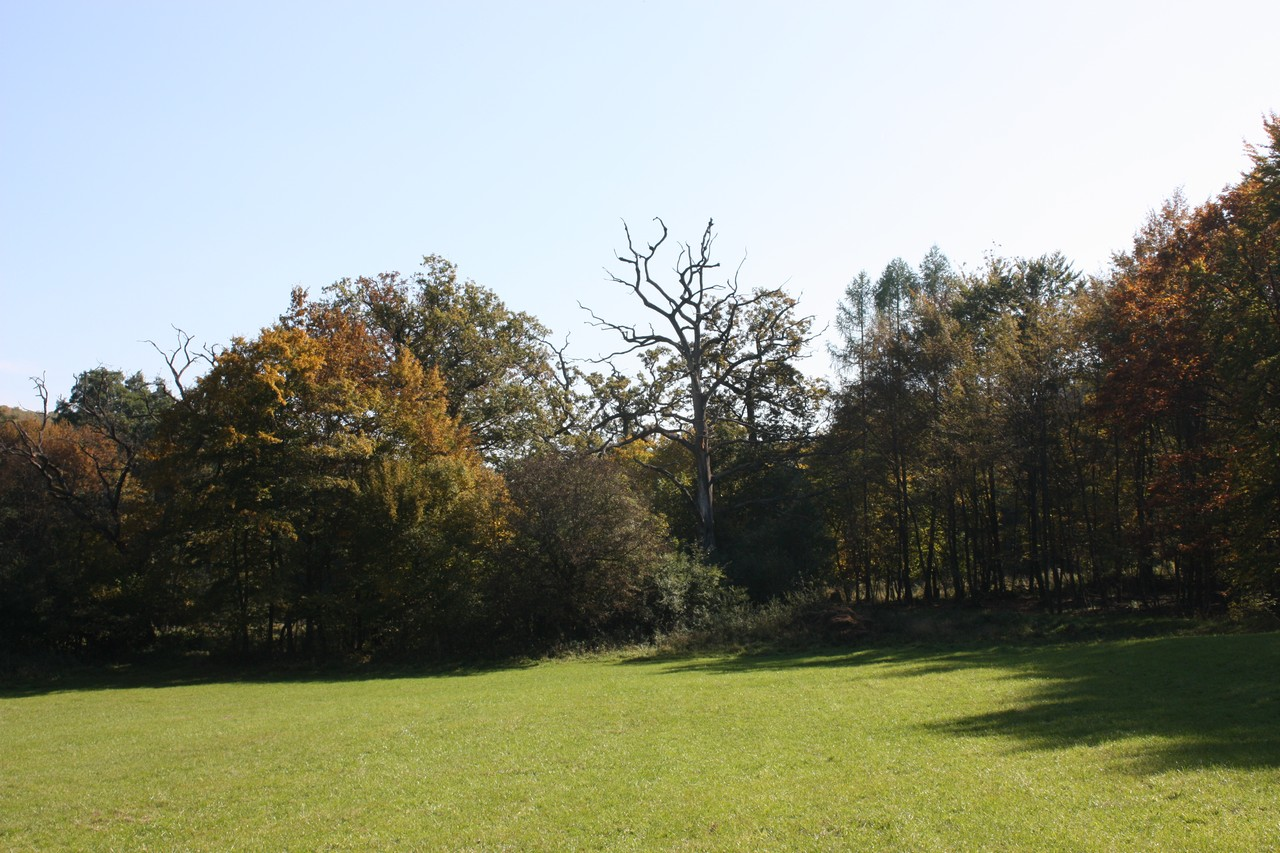

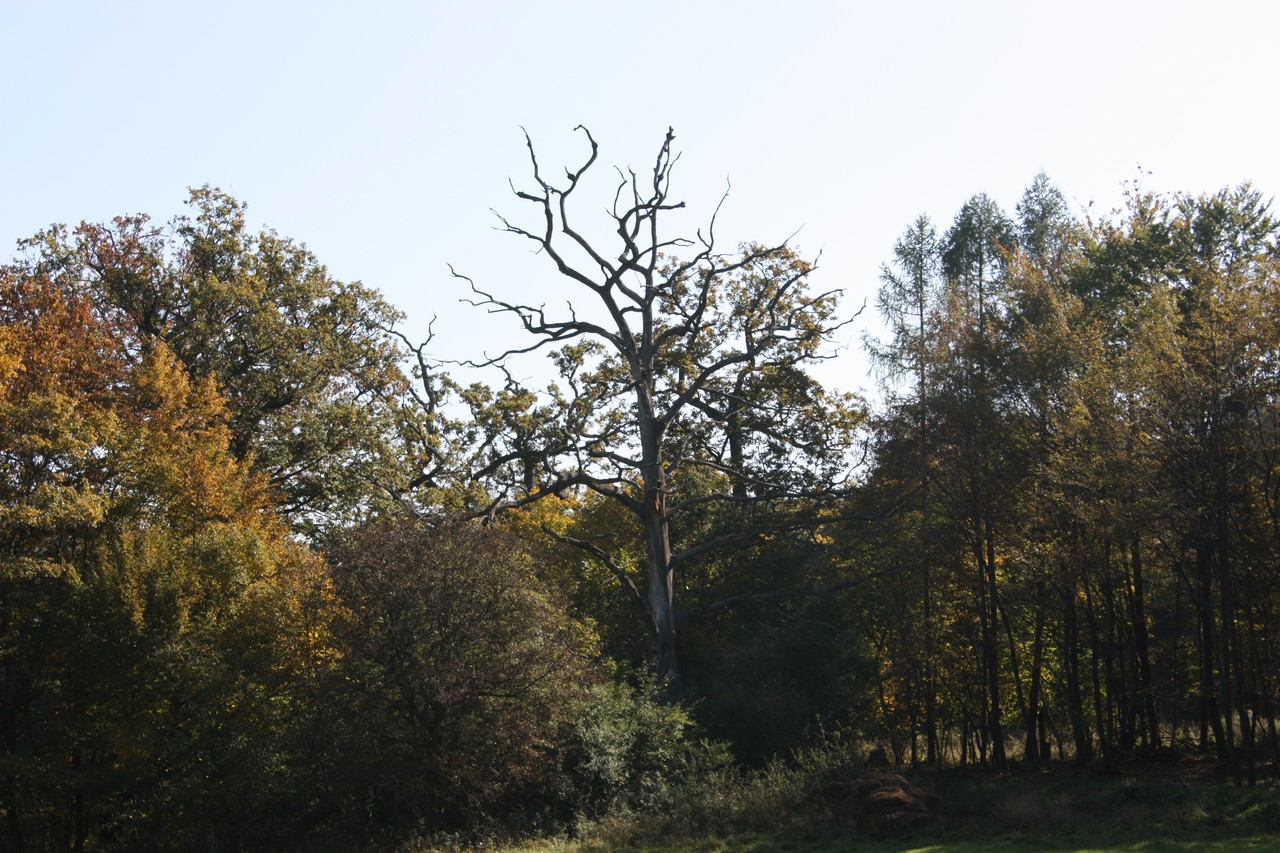

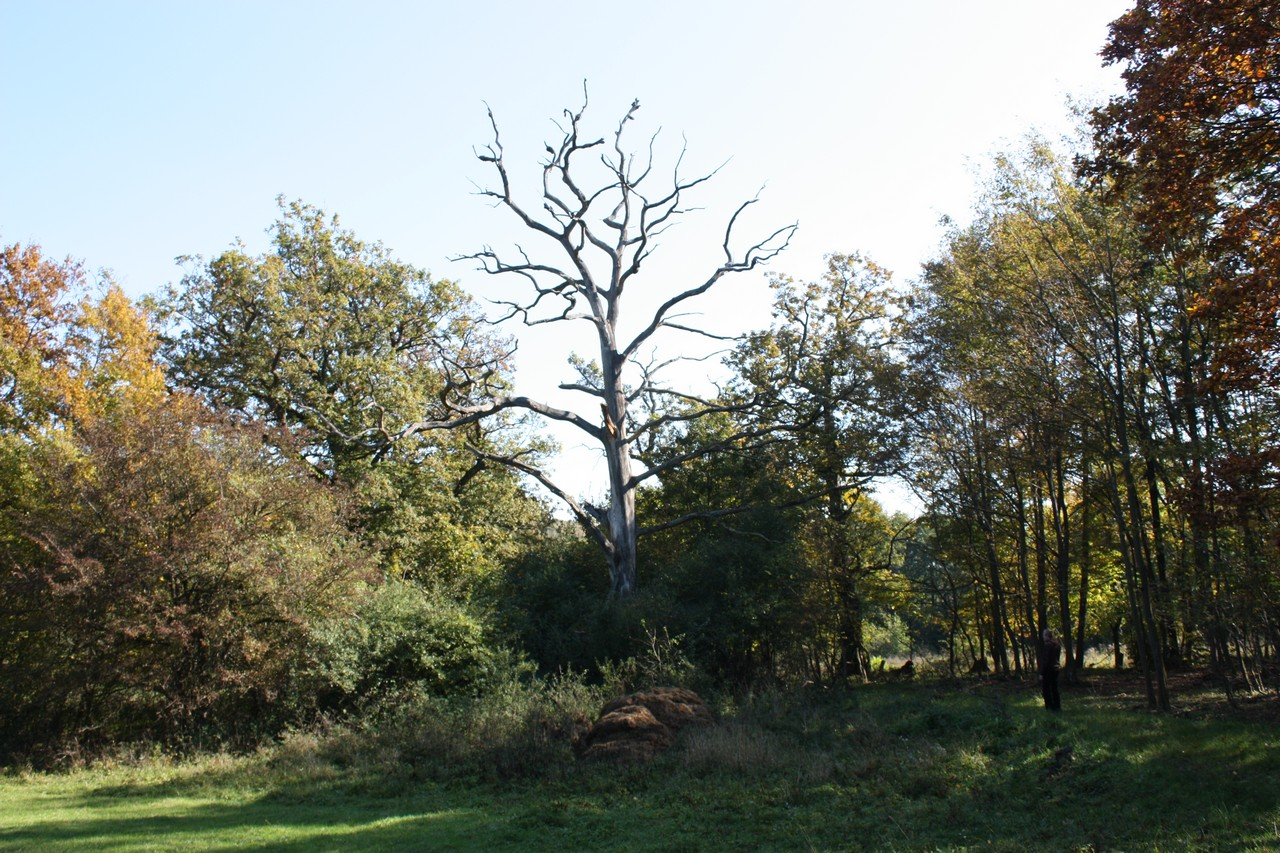

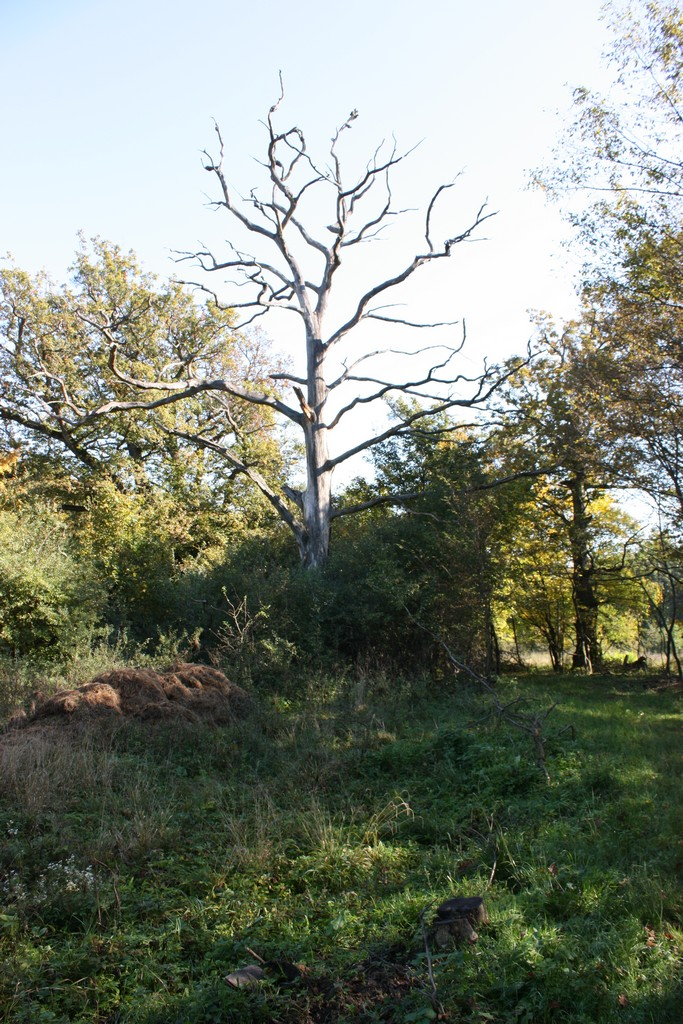

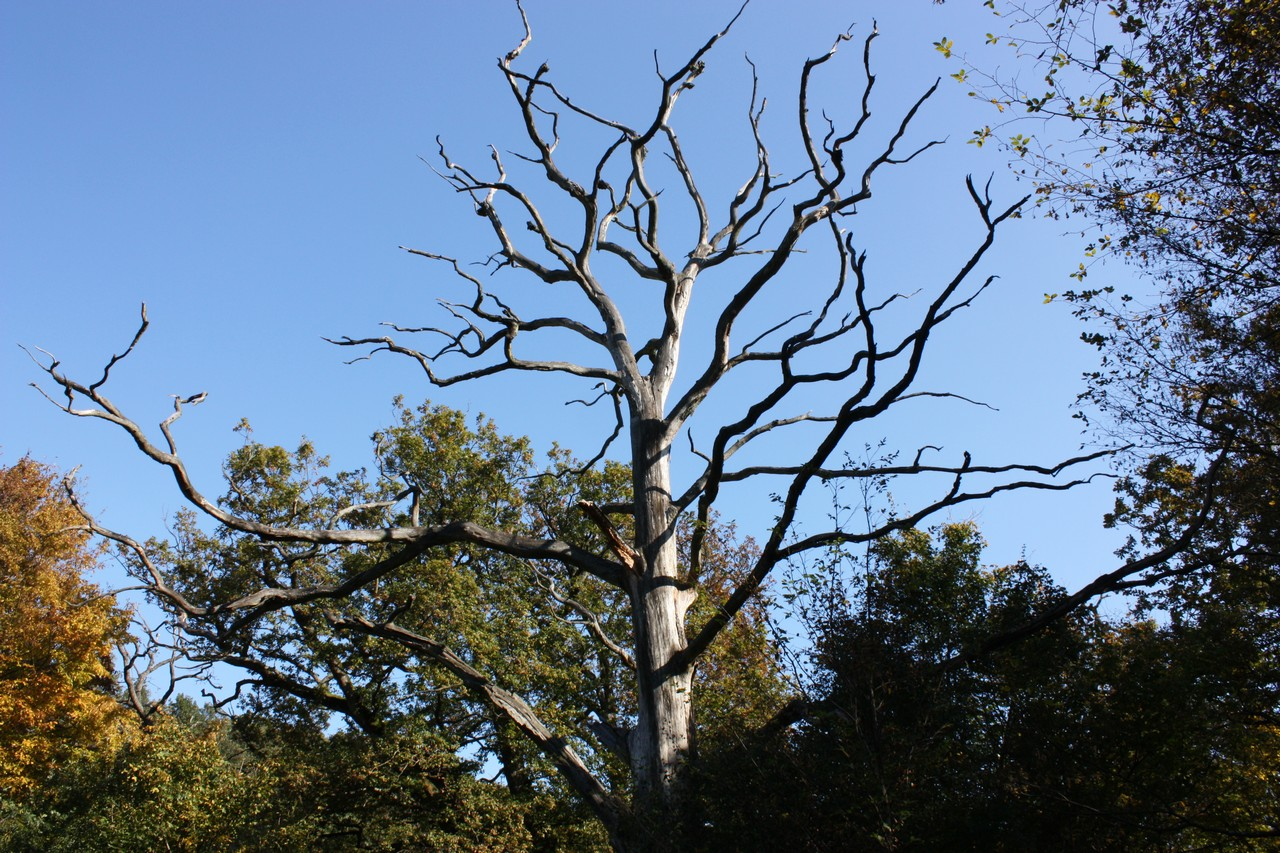

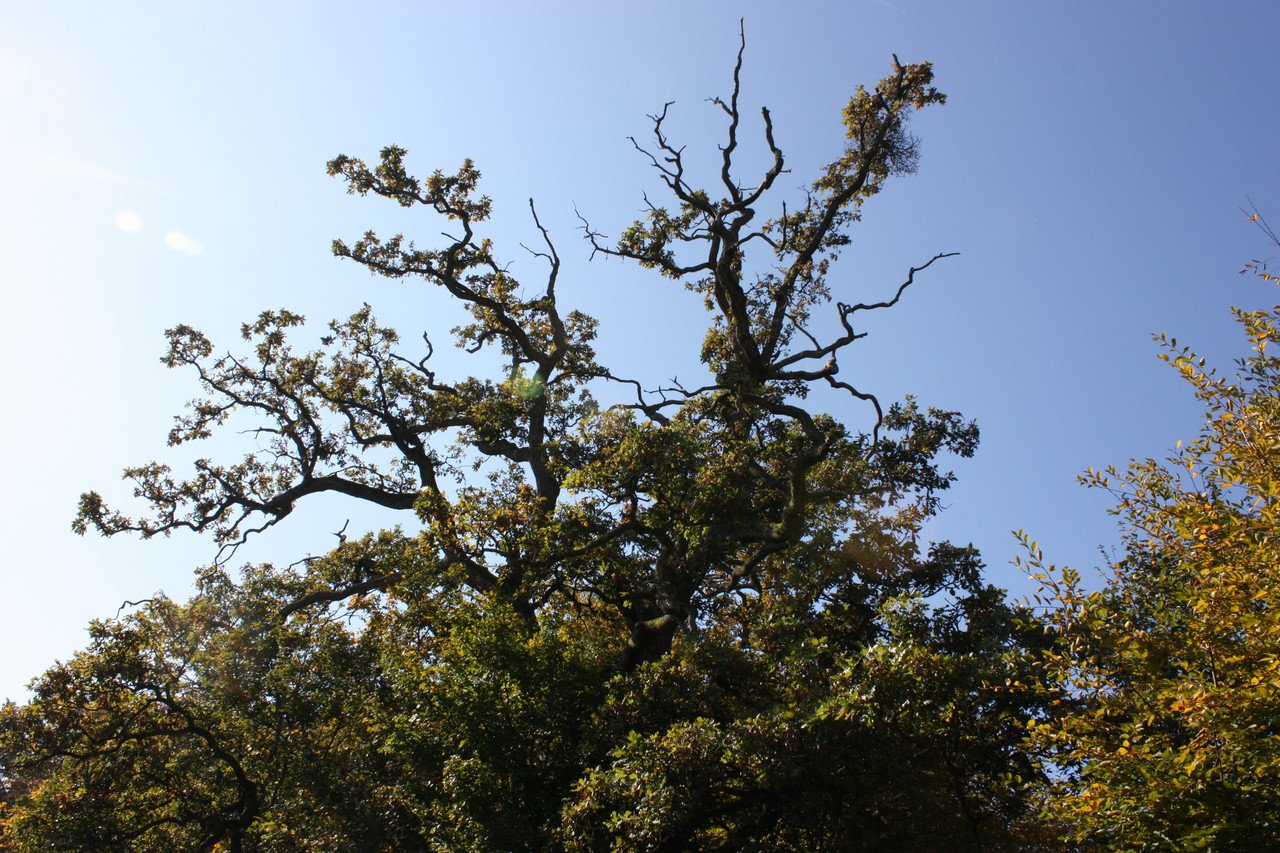

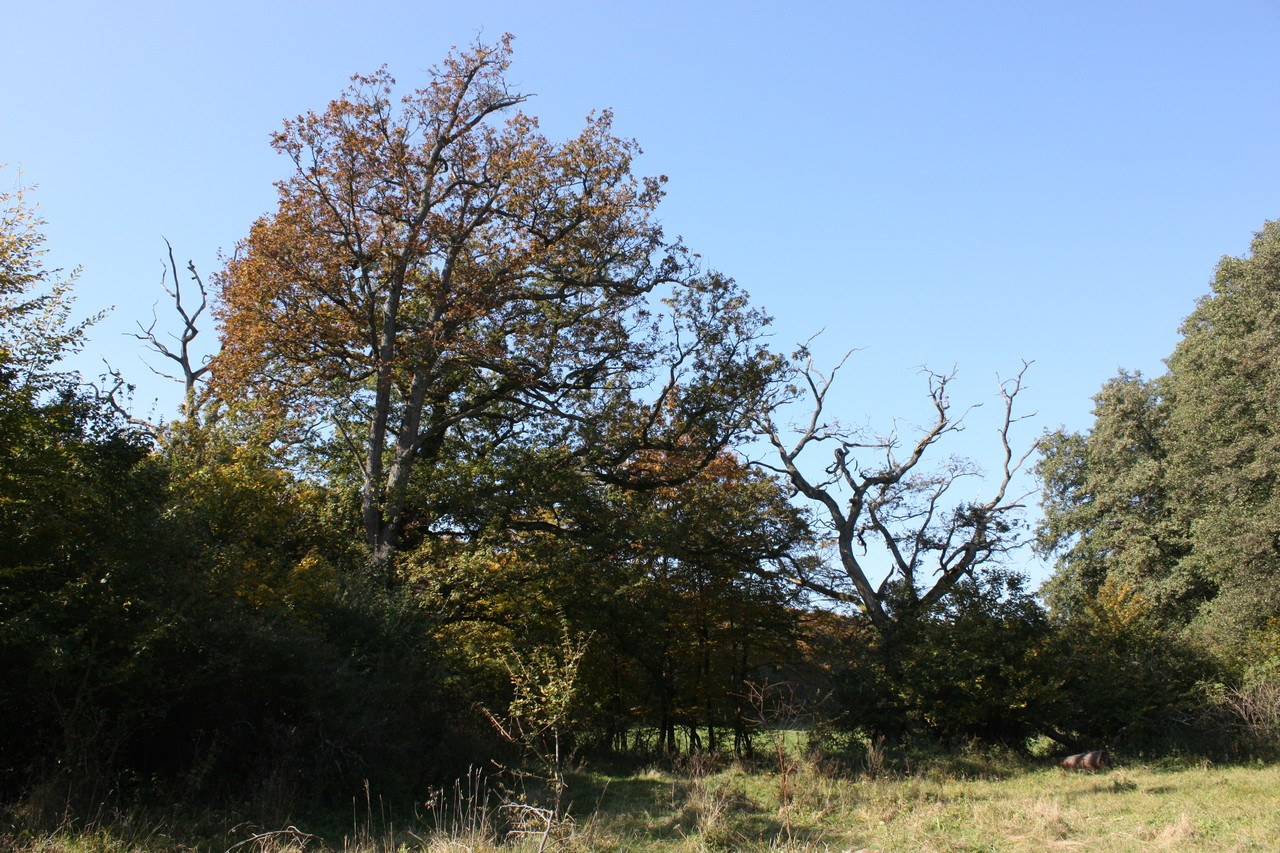

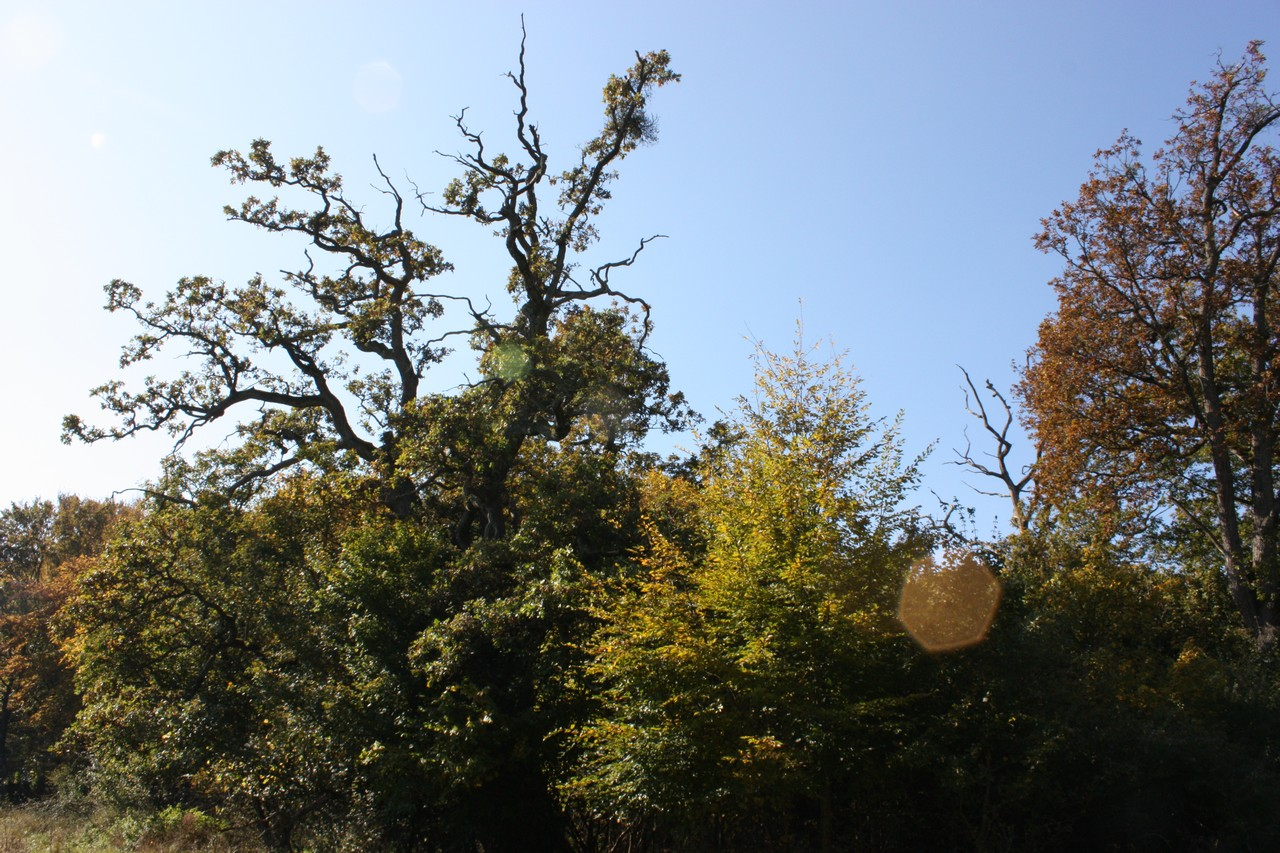

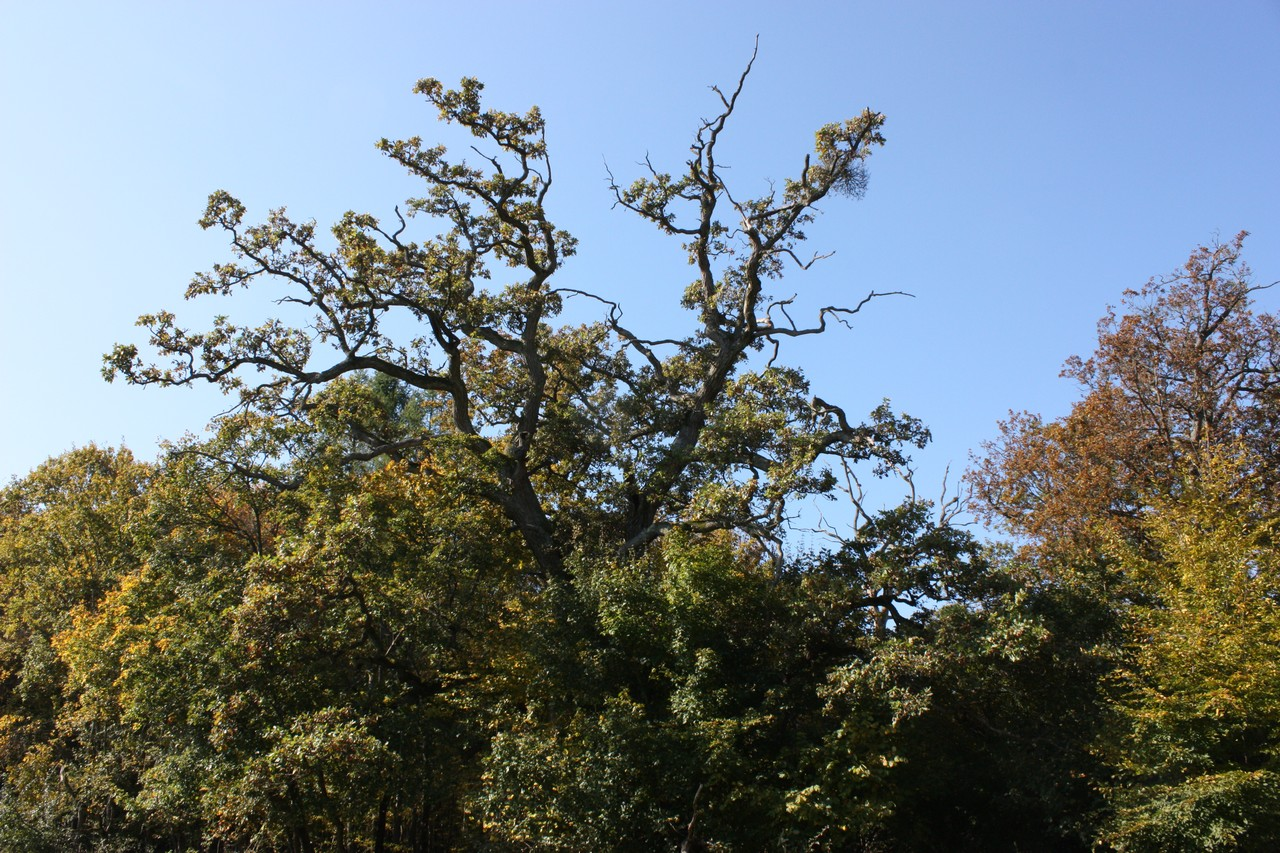

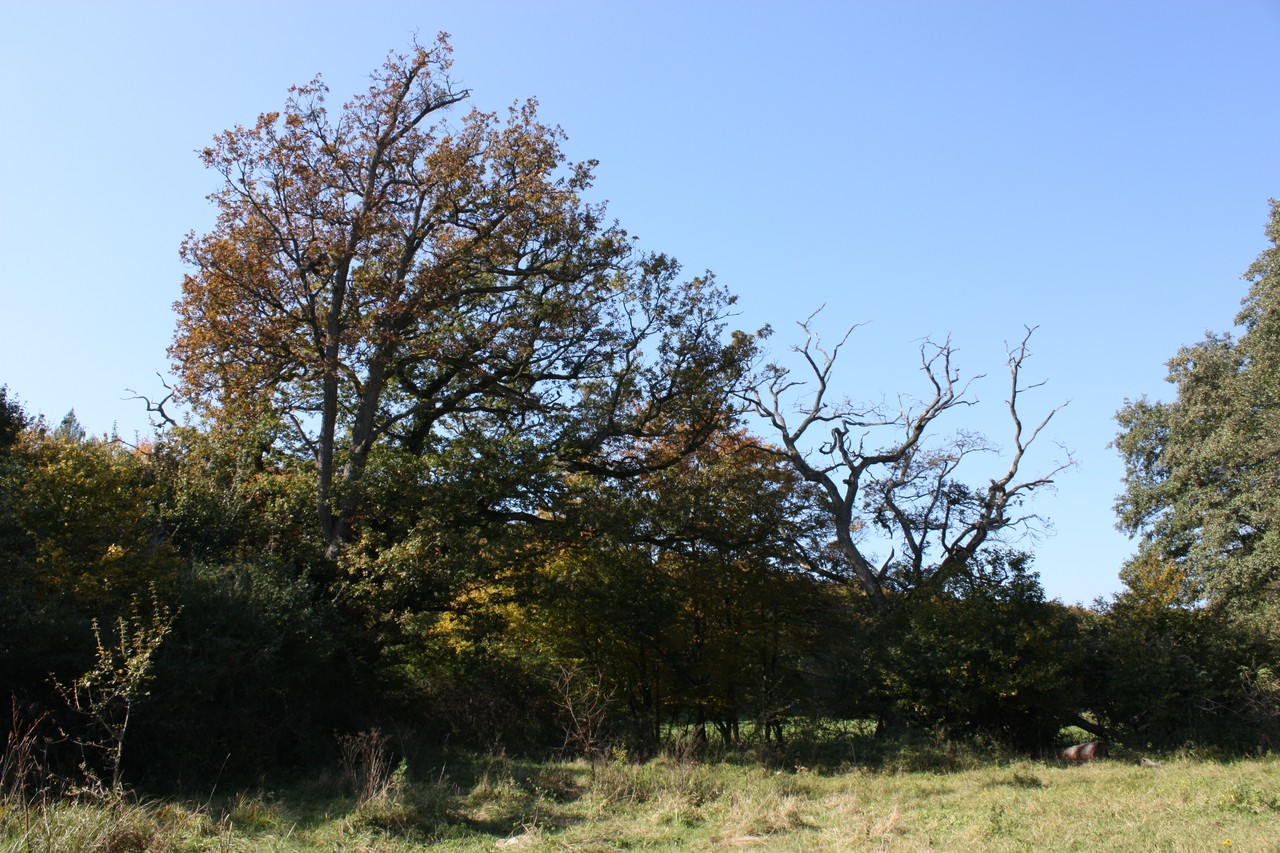

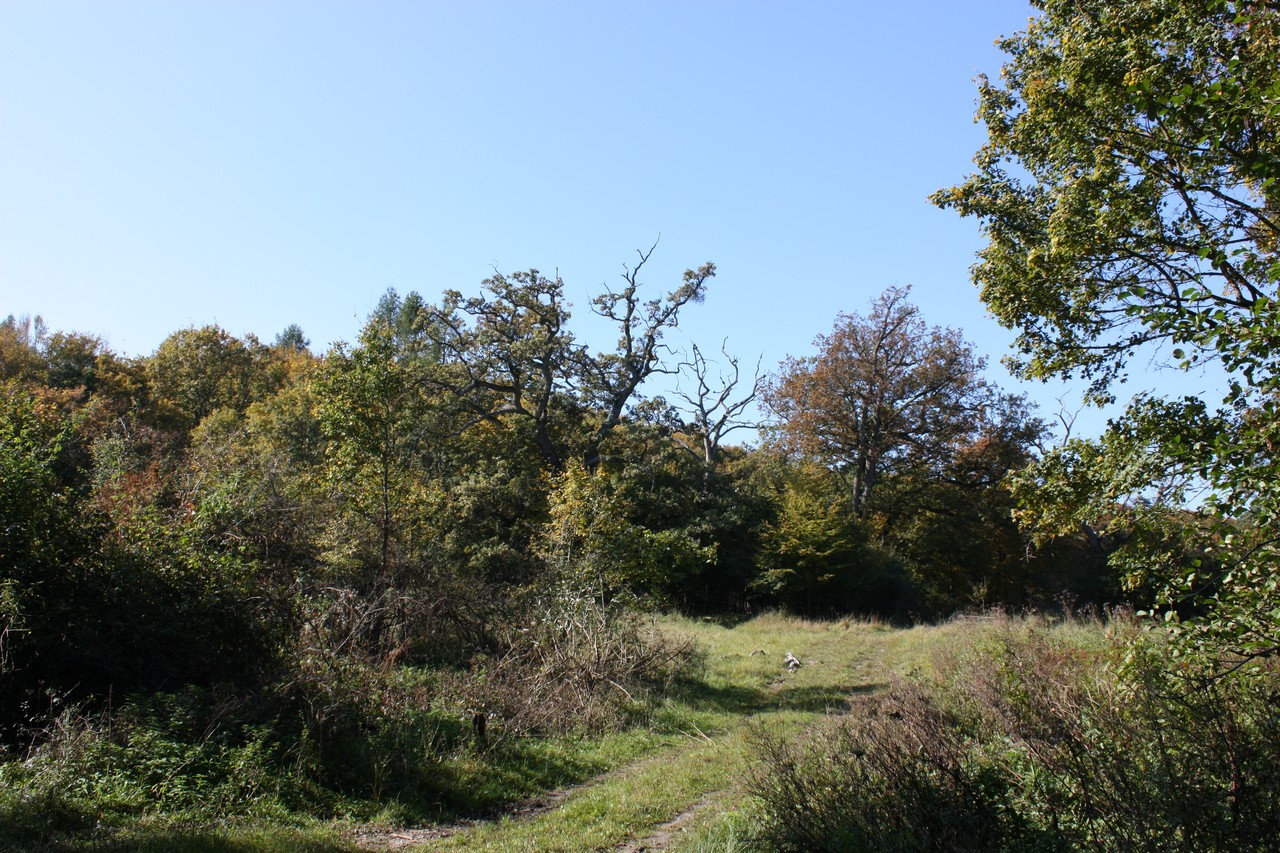
