= Slovak Central Mountains =

Mountain range in Slovakia

Coordinates: 48°30′N 19°00′E

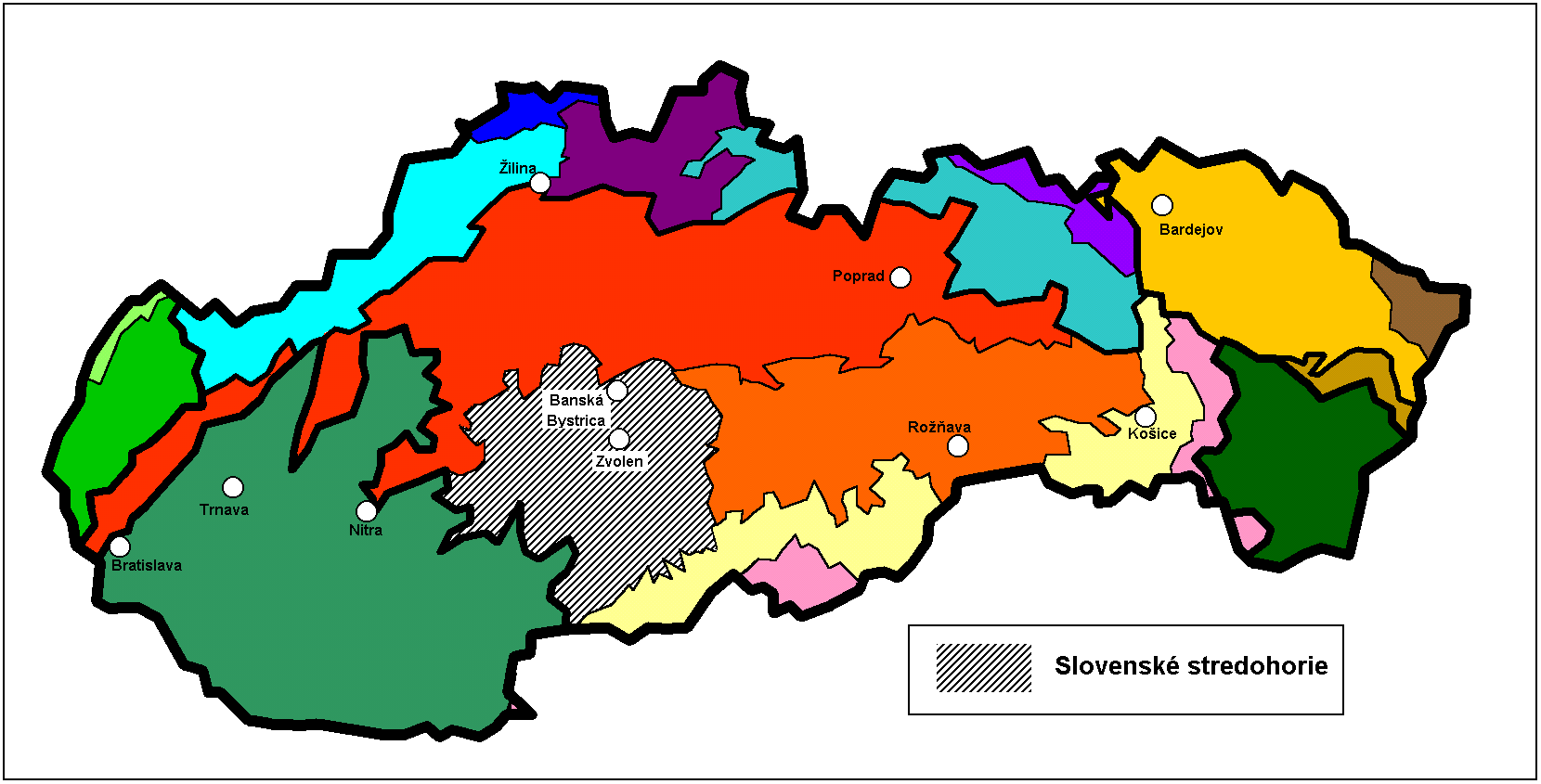
Location of Slovak Central Mountains in Slovakia (in gray)

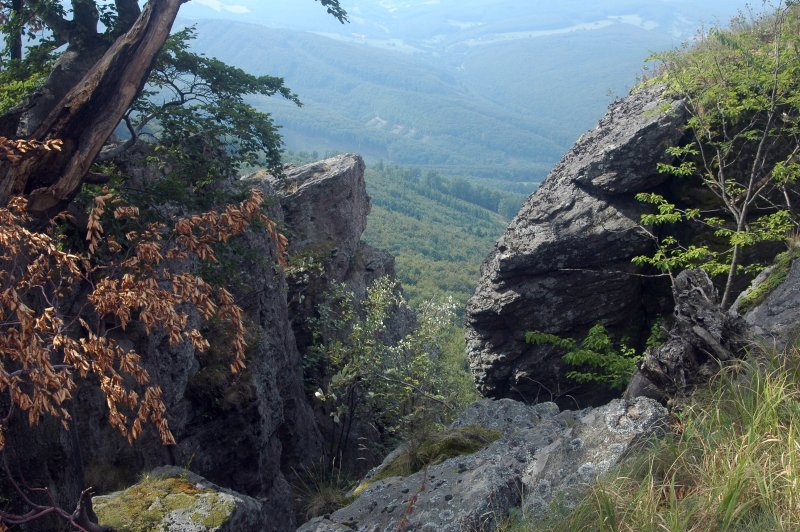
Vtáčnik mountains

The Slovak Central Mountains (Slovak: Slovenské stredohorie) are a group of mountain ranges in southern central Slovakia. The town of Zvolen lies roughly in the centre of the mountains.

The Slovak Central Mountains are a part of the Inner Western Carpathians. They are bordered by the Fatra-Tatra Area to the northwest and north, Slovak Ore Mountains (Slovenské rudohorie) to the east, Southern Slovak Basin (Juhoslovenská kotlina) to the south and by the Pannonian Plain to the southwest.

The Slovak Central Mountains are divided into the following subdivisions:

- Vtacnik Mountains
- Pohronský Inovec
- Štiavnica Mountains
- Kremnica Mountains
- Poľana
- Ostrôžky
- Javorie
- Krupina Plain
- Zvolen Basin
- Pliešovce Basin (Pliešovská kotlina)
- Žiar Basin

The highest mountain is Poľana at 1,458 m.
