= Abrahámsky Park =

Protected area in Slovakia

Coordinates: 48.2439°N 17.6342°E

Abrahámsky park
- Park Abrahám
- IUCN category IV (habitat/species management area)
- Area: 0.11 km^{2} (0.042 sq mi)
- Established: 1983

Abrahámsky Park is a nature reserve in the Slovak municipality of Abrahám. It covers an area of 10.85 ha and has a protection level of 4.

== History ==
The park was created during the nineteenth century, when the floodplain forest along the Dudváh river was transformed into parkland surrounding the castle, which was used a sanatorium. The park is directly adjacent to the forest complex of Časlov.

== Flora ==
The park consists mostly of deciduous trees, of which oak is the most abundant.
