= Pohronský Inovec =

Mountain range in Slovakia

Coordinates: 48°27′N 18°33′E

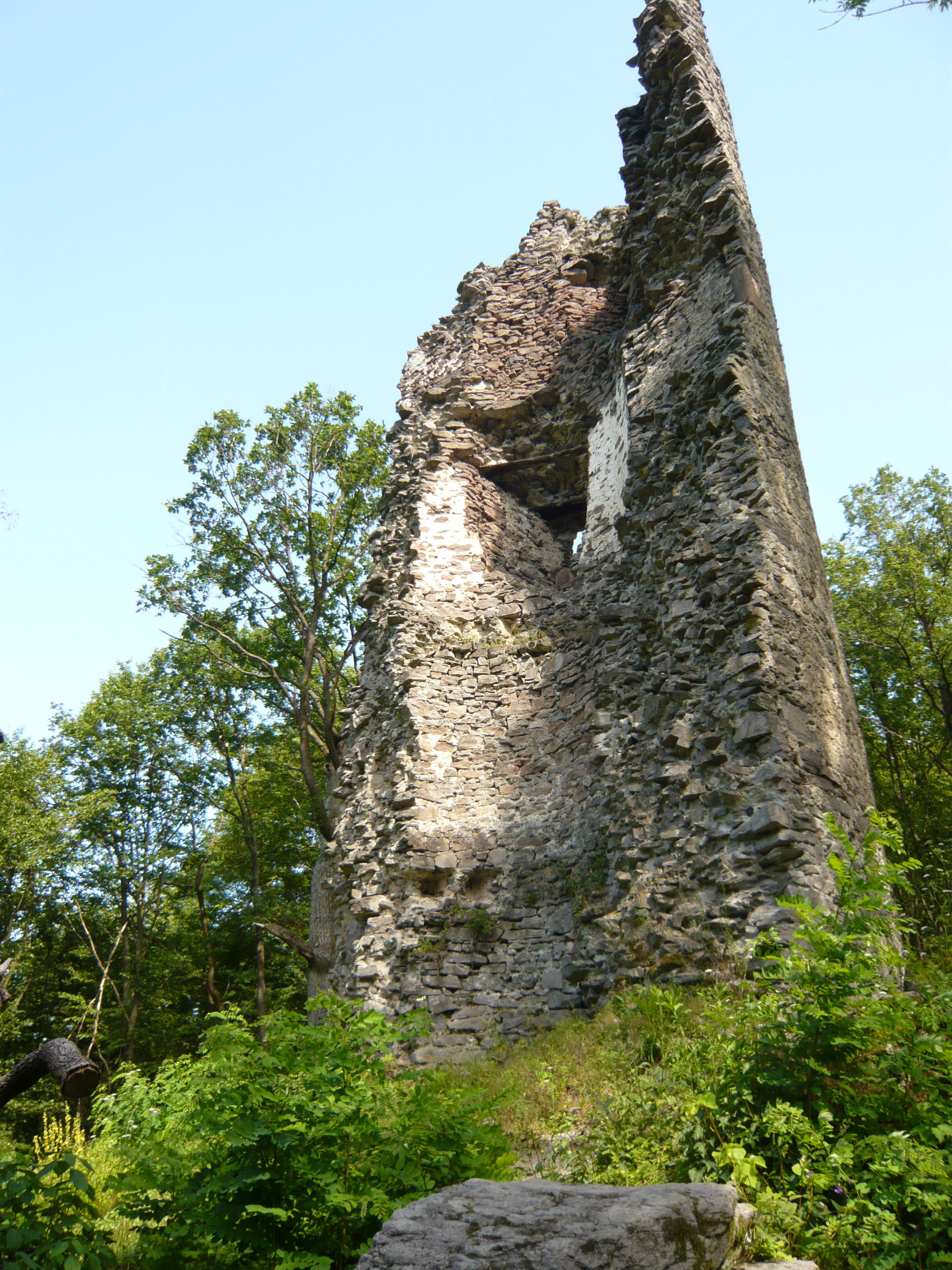
Živánská věž

Pohronský Inovec is a mountain range in Slovakia, part of the Slovenské stredohorie ranges of the Inner Western Carpathians.

The range is volcanic in origin, and composed of andesite and rhyolites. The highest peak is Veľký Inovec (Big Inovec), at 901 meters (2,956 ft) from sea level. The most popular lookout point is Benát at 692 meters (2,270 ft). The southern portion is covered by deciduous forest, predominantly oak with more beeches at higher elevations.

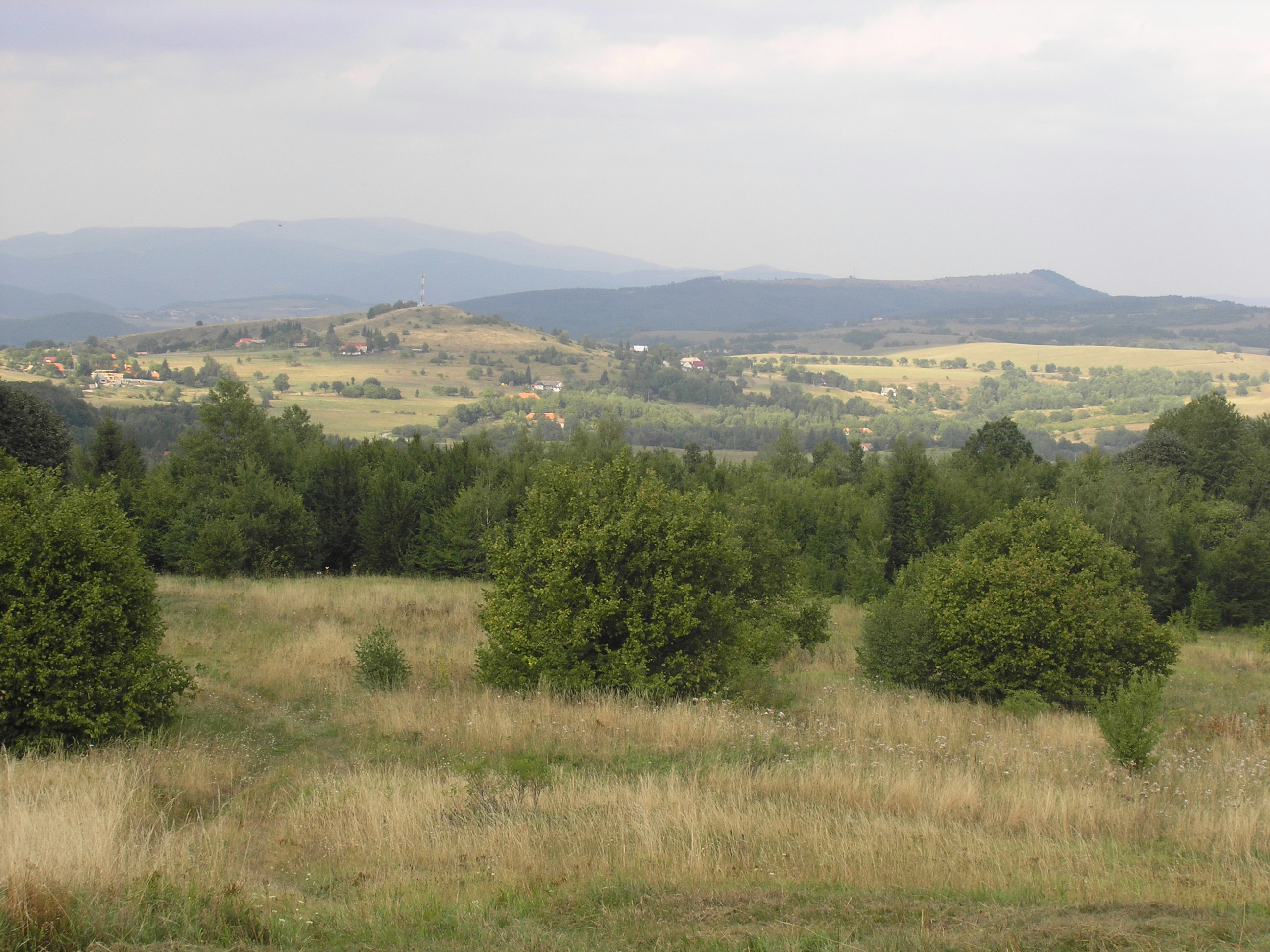
Lehotská plain

The ruins of the medieval stone watchtower Živánská věž (Živánská Tower) stands within the range, near the village of Jedľové Kostolany in the Zlaté Moravce District. It's also the headwaters of the Žitava River.
