= Krásno =

Krásno may refer to the following places:

- Krásno (Sokolov District), a town in the Karlovy Vary Region, Czech Republic
- Krásno nad Bečvou, an administrative part of Valašské Meziříčí in the Zlín Region, Czech Republic
- Krásno, Partizánske District, a municipality and village in the Trenčín Region, Slovakia
- Krásno nad Kysucou, a town in the Žilina Region, Slovakia

== See also ==
- Krasno (disambiguation)
