= Rastislav Kostka =

Slovak footballer (born 1972)

Personal information
- Date of birth: 11 September 1972 (age 54)
- Place of birth: Bošany, Czechoslovakia
- Height: 1.83 m (6 ft 0 in)
- Position: Defender

Youth career
- OFK Bošany
- Spartak Bánovce nad Bebravou

Senior career*
Years	Team	Apps	(Gls)
1990–1993	Spartak Trnava		
1993–1994	Ozeta Dukla Trenčín		
1994–2002	Spartak Trnava		
2002–2004	Staré Město	44	(3)
2004	Artmedia Petržalka	8	(0)
2005	DAC Dunajská Streda		

International career
1995–1997	Slovakia	5	(0)
- * Club domestic league appearances and goals

Rastislav Kostka (born 11 September 1972) is a Slovak former footballer who played as a defender. He is most known for his time with Spartak Trnava, playing 197 league games.

During his career, Kostka played for Spartak Trnava, Ozeta Dukla Trenčín, 1. FC Synot Staré Město, Artmédia Petržalka and DAC Dunajská Streda. He represented the Slovak national team in five matches.

== Early life ==
Kostka was born on 11 September 1972 in Bošany. He started playing football at the age of nine in Bošany, originally as a striker. As a teenager, he played in the youth league for Spartak Bánovce nad Bebravou.

== Club career ==
Kostka was brought to the Spartak Trnava youth team by coach Richard Matovič. He played his first match for the club in a home match on 14 August 1991, when Spartak drew 2–2 with Baník Ostrava. He scored his first goal the following season in a 3–2 loss against Slavia Prague. After military service in Trenčín, he returned to Trnava in the summer of 1994, where he was a regular in the starting eleven. He played in the final of the 1996 Slovak Cup, where his team lost 2–1 against ŠK Futura Humenné. In 1998, he won the Cup after beating 1. FC Košice 2–0 in the final. He scored 2 goals in the Intertoto Cup against Čukarički Belehrad and Daugava Riga. He played 4 matches in the UEFA Cup. He played his last duel in the spring of 2001 against Košice, where his team won 2–1. He played a total of 197 league matches for Spartak and netted 34 goals.

In June 2002, Kostka joined Czech club 1. FC Synot Staré Město. Following the club's corruption scandal, he returned to Slovakia to play for Artmedia Petržalka.

== International career ==
In June 1995, Kostka received his first international call-up to the Slovakia national team ahead of a game against Poland. He played in a 1–0 win against Israel in the Euro 1996 qualifying rounds, coming on as a substitute in the 89th minute for Igor Bališ.
