= Krasne =

Krasne or Krásné may refer to:

== Places ==
=== Canada ===
- Krasne, Saskatchewan, near Quinton, Saskatchewan

=== Czech Republic ===
- Krásné (Chrudim District), a municipality and village in the Pardubice Region
- Krásné (Žďár nad Sázavou District), a municipality and village in the Vysočina Region
- Krásné, a village and part of Tři Sekery in the Karlovy Vary Region

=== Poland ===
- Krasne, Gmina Rejowiec Fabryczny in Lublin Voivodeship (east Poland)
- Krasne, Gmina Wojsławice in Lublin Voivodeship (east Poland)
- Krasne, Augustów County in Podlaskie Voivodeship (north-east Poland)
- Krasne, Białystok County in Podlaskie Voivodeship (north-east Poland)
- Krasne, Gmina Giby in Podlaskie Voivodeship (north-east Poland)
- Krasne, Gmina Krasnopol in Podlaskie Voivodeship (north-east Poland)
- Krasne, Lubartów County in Lublin Voivodeship (east Poland)
- Krasne, Sokółka County in Podlaskie Voivodeship (north-east Poland)
- Krasne, Zamość County in Lublin Voivodeship (east Poland)
- Krasne, Przeworsk County in Subcarpathian Voivodeship (south-east Poland)
- Krasne, Rzeszów County in Subcarpathian Voivodeship (south-east Poland)
- Krasne, Masovian Voivodeship (east-central Poland)
- Krasne, Człuchów County in Pomeranian Voivodeship (north Poland)
- Krasne, West Pomeranian Voivodeship (north-west Poland)
- Krasne Commune, Masovian Voivodeship (east-central Poland)
- Krasne Commune, Subcarpathian Voivodeship (south-east Poland)

=== Ukraine ===
- Krasne, Zolochiv Raion, Lviv Oblast, the site of the Krasne longwave transmitter
  - Krasne railway station
- Krasne, Stryi Raion, Lviv Oblast
- Krasne, Bolhrad Raion, Odesa Oblast
- The former name of Ivanivske, Donetsk Oblast
- The former name of Sontsivka, Donetsk Oblast

== People ==
- Nancy Krasne, American politician
- Philip N. Krasne (1905-1999), American lawyer and film and TV producer

== See also ==
- Krasna (disambiguation)
- Krasno (disambiguation)
