= Nedanovce =

- Municipality
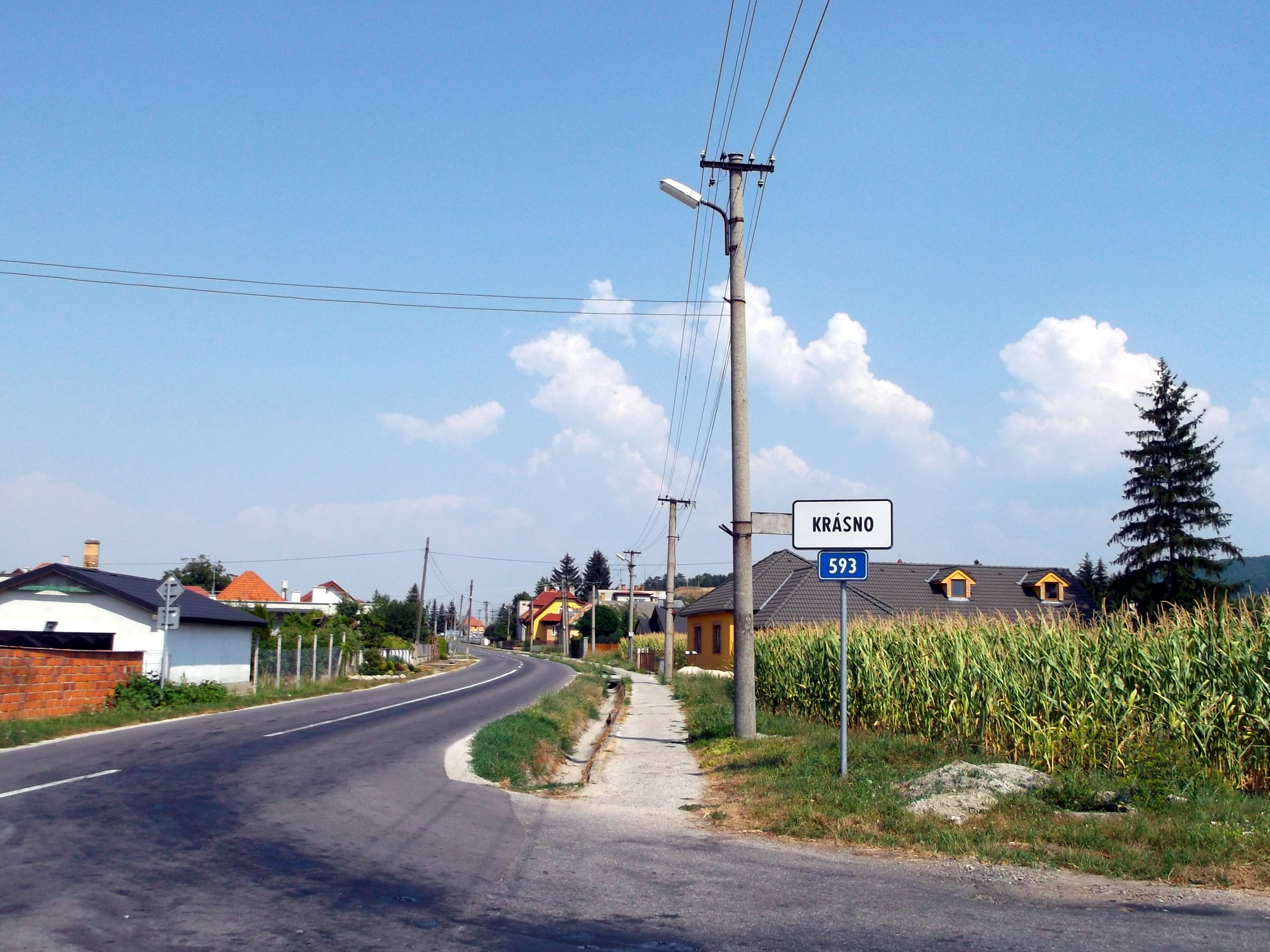

- Flag

- Location of Nedanovce in the Trenčín Region Location of Nedanovce in Slovakia
- Coordinates: 48.60°N 18.30°E
- Country: Slovakia
- Region: Trenčín Region
- District: Partizánske District
- First mentioned: 1344

Area
  - Total: 7.00 km^{2} (2.70 sq mi)
- Elevation: 180 m (590 ft)

Population (2025)
  - Total: 614
- Time zone: UTC+1 (CET)
  - Summer (DST): UTC+2 (CEST)
- Postal code: 958 43
- Area code: +421 38
- Vehicle registration plate (until 2022): PE
- Website: www.obecnedanovce.sk

Nedanovce (Hungarian: Nadány) is a village and municipality in Partizánske District in the Trenčín Region of western Slovakia.

== History ==
In historical records the village was first mentioned in 1344.

== Geography ==
The municipality lies at an altitude of 180 metres (590 ft) and covers an area of 7.00 km^{2} (2.70 sq mi) (2025).

== Population ==
Population statistic (10 years)
Year	1995	2005	2015	2025
Count	536	613	617	614
Difference		+14.36%	+0.65%	−0.48%

Population statistic
Year	2024	2025
Count	620	614
Difference		−0.96%

It has a population of 614 people (31 December 2025).

=== Ethnicity ===
Census 2021 (1+ %)
Ethnicity	Number	Fraction
Slovak	607	99.18%
Total	612	

In year 2021 was 612 people by ethnicity 607 as Slovak, 3 as Not found out, 2 as Hungarian, 2 as Other, 1 as Romani, 1 as Russian, 1 as Romanian and 1 as German.

Note on population: The difference values of population numbers in the table "Population statistic" and in the sections "Ethnicity" & "Religion" is caused by the use of various statistical methods.

=== Religion ===
Census 2021 (1+ %)
Religion	Number	Fraction
Roman Catholic Church	496	81.05%
None	79	12.91%
Greek Catholic Church	9	1.47%
Not found out	7	1.14%
Total	612	

In year 2021 was 612 people by religion 496 from Roman Catholic Church, 79 from None, 9 from Greek Catholic Church, 7 from Not found out, 5 from Other and not ascertained christian church, 4 from Evangelical Church, 3 from Christian Congregations in Slovakia, 3 from Buddhism, 3 from Ad hoc movements, 1 from Paganism and natural spirituality, 1 from Islam and 1 from United Methodist Church.
