= Turčianky =

- Municipality
- Flag

- Location of Turčianky in the Trenčín Region Location of Turčianky in Slovakia
- Coordinates: 48.58°N 18.32°E
- Country: Slovakia
- Region: Trenčín Region
- District: Partizánske District
- First mentioned: 1293

Area
  - Total: 3.73 km^{2} (1.44 sq mi)
- Elevation: 223 m (732 ft)

Population (2025)
  - Total: 133
- Time zone: UTC+1 (CET)
  - Summer (DST): UTC+2 (CEST)
- Postal code: 958 44
- Area code: +421 38
- Vehicle registration plate (until 2022): PE
- Website: {{URL|example.com|optional display text}}

Turčianky (Hungarian: Turcsány) is a village and municipality in Partizánske District in the Trenčín Region of western Slovakia.

== History ==
In historical records, the village was first mentioned in 1293.

== Geography ==
The municipality lies at an altitude of 223 metres (732 ft) and covers an area of 3.73 km^{2} (1.44 sq mi) (2025).

== Population ==
Population statistic (10 years)
| Year | 1995 | 2005 | 2015 | 2025 |
|---|---|---|---|---|
| Count | 136 | 151 | 149 | 133 |
| Difference | | +11.02% | −1.32% | −10.73% |

Population statistic
| Year | 2024 | 2025 |
|---|---|---|
| Count | 134 | 133 |
| Difference | | −0.74% |

It has a population of 133 people (31 December 2025).

=== Ethnicity ===
Census 2021 (1+ %)
| Ethnicity | Number | Fraction |
|---|---|---|
| Slovak | 137 | 97.85% |
| Total | 140 | |

In year 2021 was 140 people by ethnicity 137 as Slovak, 1 as Czech, 1 as Rusyn, 1 as Not found out and 1 as Other.

Note on population: The difference values of population numbers in the table "Population statistic" and in the sections "Ethnicity" & "Religion" is caused by the use of various statistical methods.

=== Religion ===
Census 2021 (1+ %)
| Religion | Number | Fraction |
|---|---|---|
| Roman Catholic Church | 114 | 81.43% |
| None | 24 | 17.14% |
| Total | 140 | |

In year 2021 was 140 people by religion 114 from Roman Catholic Church, 24 from None, 1 from Not found out and 1 from Evangelical Church.
