= Livina =

- Municipality
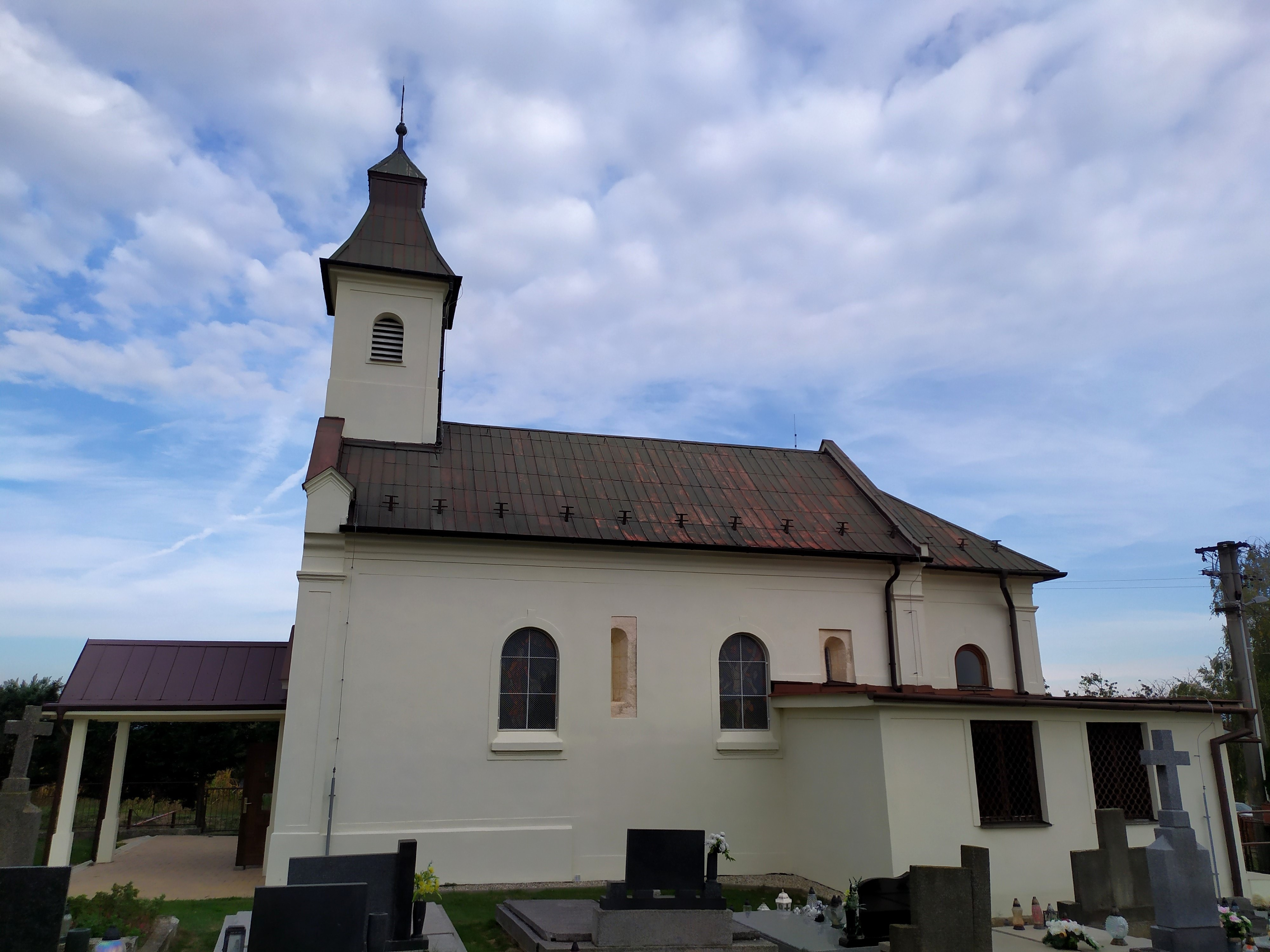

- Flag

- Location of Livina in the Trenčín Region Location of Livina in Slovakia
- Coordinates: 48.65°N 18.25°E
- Country: Slovakia
- Region: Trenčín Region
- District: Partizánske District
- First mentioned: 1340

Area
  - Total: 3.22 km^{2} (1.24 sq mi)
- Elevation: 184 m (604 ft)

Population (2025)
  - Total: 116
- Time zone: UTC+1 (CET)
  - Summer (DST): UTC+2 (CEST)
- Postal code: 956 32
- Area code: +421 38
- Vehicle registration plate (until 2022): PE
- Website: www.livina.sk

Livina (Hungarian: Lévna) is a village and municipality in Partizánske District in the Trenčín Region of western Slovakia.

== History ==
In historical records the village was first mentioned in 1340.

== Geography ==
The municipality lies at an altitude of 184 metres (604 ft) and covers an area of 3.22 km^{2} (1.24 sq mi) (2025).

== Population ==
Population statistic (10 years)
Year	1995	2005	2015	2025
Count	92	119	117	116
Difference		+29.34%	−1.68%	−0.85%

Population statistic
Year	2024	2025
Count	119	116
Difference		−2.52%

It has a population of 116 people (31 December 2025).

=== Ethnicity ===
Census 2021 (1+ %)
Ethnicity	Number	Fraction
Slovak	116	98.3%
Not found out	2	1.69%
Total	118	

In year 2021 was 118 people by ethnicity 116 as Slovak and 2 as Not found out.

Note on population: The difference values of population numbers in the table "Population statistic" and in the sections "Ethnicity" & "Religion" is caused by the use of various statistical methods.

=== Religion ===
Census 2021 (1+ %)
Religion	Number	Fraction
Roman Catholic Church	91	77.12%
None	22	18.64%
Not found out	3	2.54%
Total	118	

In year 2021 was 118 people by religion 91 from Roman Catholic Church, 22 from None, 3 from Not found out, 1 from Evangelical Church and 1 from Ad hoc movements.
