= Veľké Uherce =

- Municipality
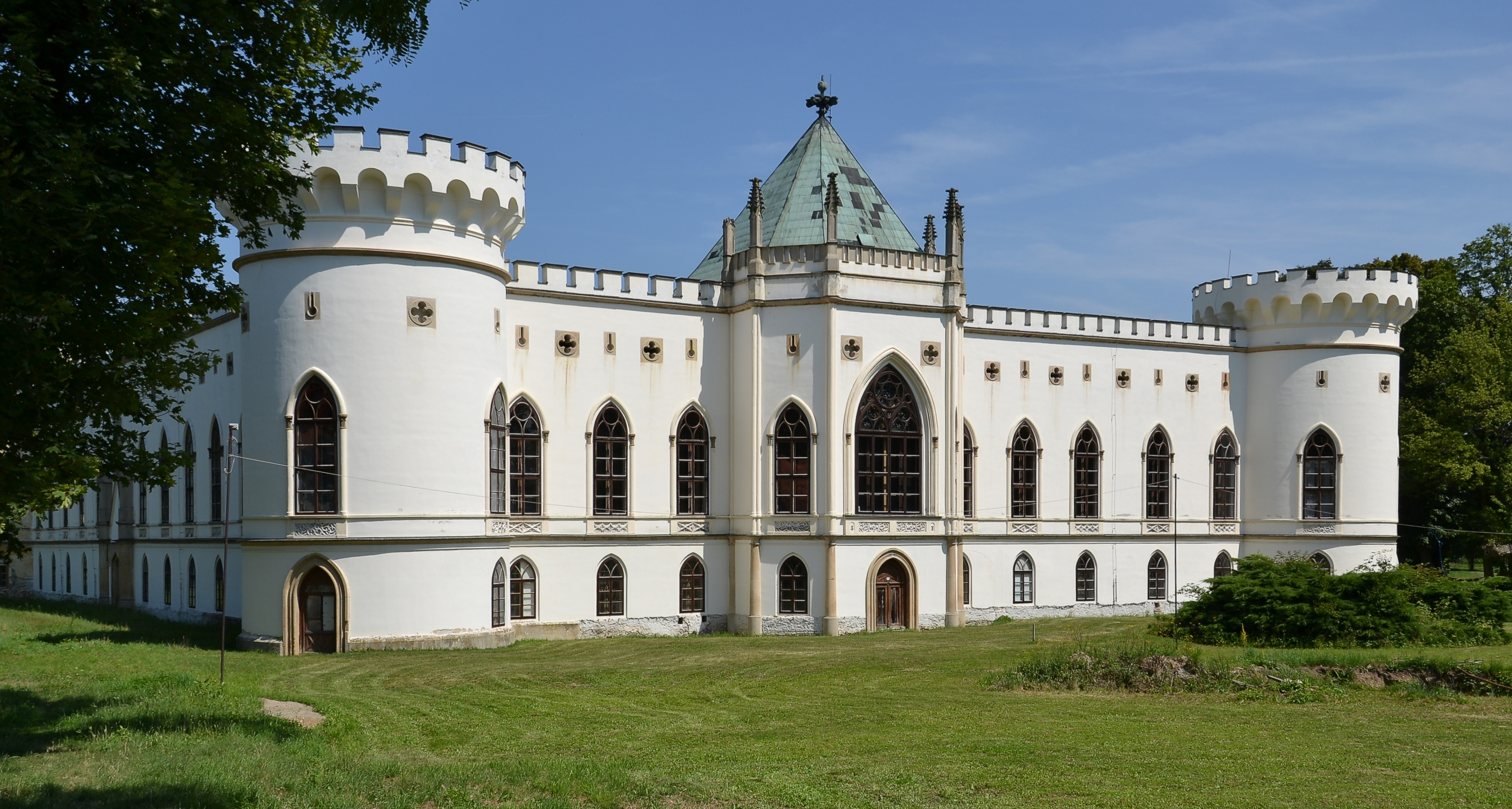

- Flag

- Location of Veľké Uherce in the Trenčín Region Location of Veľké Uherce in Slovakia
- Coordinates: 48.60°N 18.43°E
- Country: Slovakia
- Region: Trenčín Region
- District: Partizánske District
- First mentioned: 1274

Area
  - Total: 27.78 km^{2} (10.73 sq mi)
- Elevation: 219 m (719 ft)

Population (2025)
  - Total: 1,954
- Time zone: UTC+1 (CET)
  - Summer (DST): UTC+2 (CEST)
- Postal code: 958 41
- Area code: +421 38
- Vehicle registration plate (until 2022): PE
- Website: www.velkeuherce.sk

Veľké Uherce (Hungarian: Nagyugróc) is a village and municipality in Partizánske District in the Trenčín Region of western Slovakia.

== History ==
In historical records the village was first mentioned in 1274 where it was mentioned as one of the first three townships in Austria-Hungary.

In 1869 Michael Thonet created a factory for bentwood furniture.

In the village, there is an originally renaissance castle from the start of the 17th century, rebuilt into a baroque style in the 18th century, and at the end of the 19th century, completely rebuilt into a romantic neogothic style. Today, the castle is owned by a descendant of the Thonet family.

During the SNU, there was a base of operations of the rebellion units defending Baťovany (Partizánkse today)

== Geography ==
The municipality lies at an altitude of 219 metres (719 ft) and covers an area of 27.78 km^{2} (10.73 sq mi) (2025).

== Population ==
Population statistic (10 years)
Year	1995	2005	2015	2025
Count	2002	1985	2040	1954
Difference		−0.84%	+2.77%	−4.21%

Population statistic
Year	2024	2025
Count	1980	1954
Difference		−1.31%

It has a population of 1954 people (31 December 2025).

=== Ethnicity ===
Census 2021 (1+ %)
Ethnicity	Number	Fraction
Slovak	1946	97.78%
Not found out	30	1.5%
Total	1990	

In year 2021 was 1990 people by ethnicity 1946 as Slovak, 30 as Not found out, 18 as Czech, 8 as Other, 7 as English, 6 as Russian, 5 as Italian, 4 as Polish, 4 as Hungarian, 1 as Rusyn, 1 as Romanian and 1 as Canadian.

Note on population: The difference values of population numbers in the table "Population statistic" and in the sections "Ethnicity" & "Religion" is caused by the use of various statistical methods.

=== Religion ===
Census 2021 (1+ %)
Religion	Number	Fraction
Roman Catholic Church	1422	71.46%
None	443	22.26%
Not found out	45	2.26%
Total	1990	

In year 2021 was 1990 people by religion 1422 from Roman Catholic Church, 443 from None, 45 from Not found out, 18 from Evangelical Church, 16 from Christian Congregations in Slovakia, 13 from Ad hoc movements, 12 from Greek Catholic Church, 5 from Buddhism, 4 from Calvinist Church, 3 from Paganism and natural spirituality, 3 from Jehovah's Witnesses, 3 from Hinduism, 1 from Eastern Orthodox Church, 1 from Other and not ascertained christian church and 1 from Other.
