= Ješkova Ves =

- Municipality
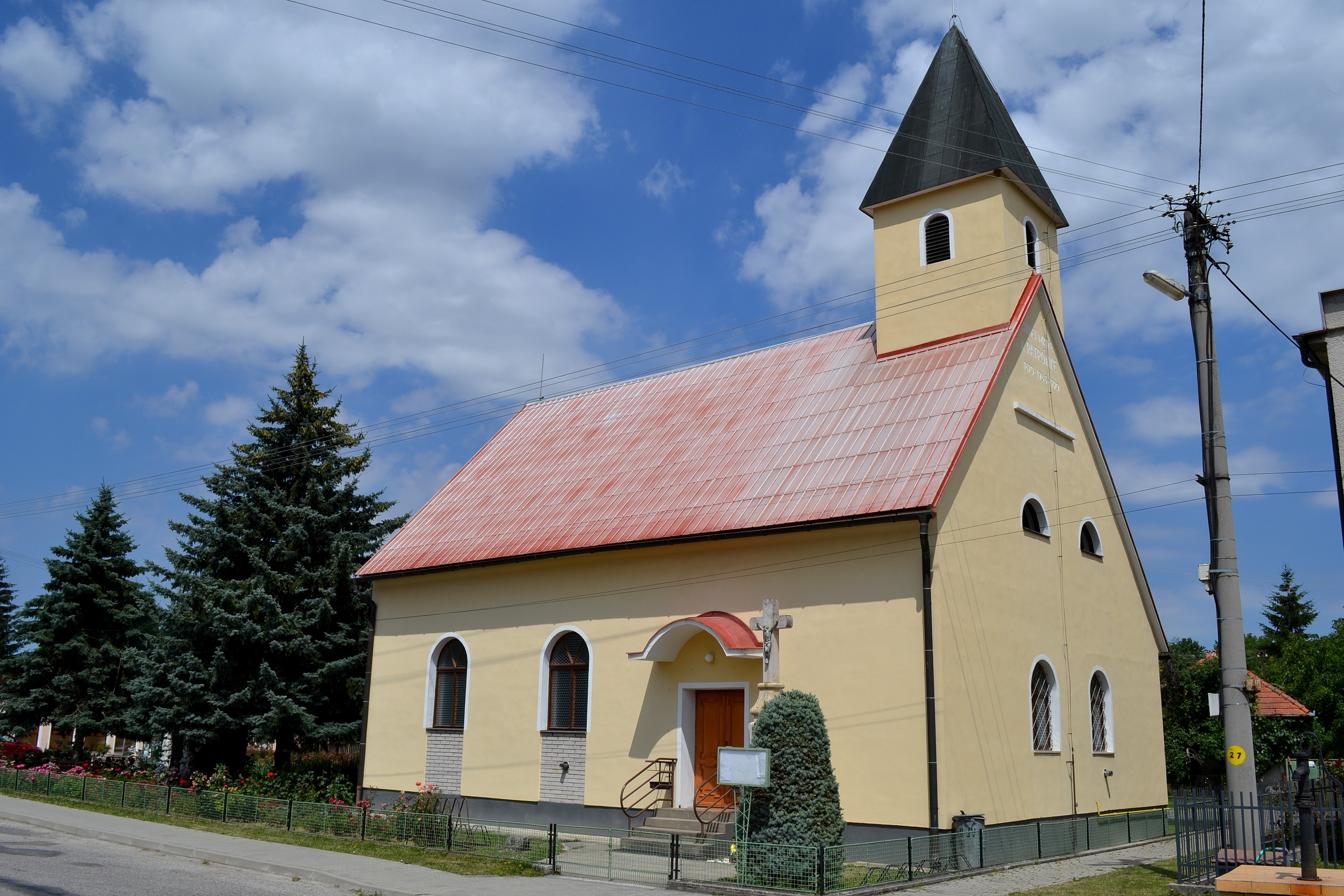
- Church of Seven Sorrows of Blessed Virgin Mary

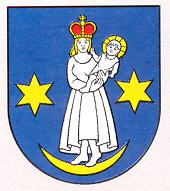
- Flag Coat of arms

- Location of Ješkova Ves in the Trenčín Region Location of Ješkova Ves in Slovakia
- Coordinates: 48.55°N 18.34°E
- Country: Slovakia
- Region: Trenčín Region
- District: Partizánske District
- First mentioned: 1430

Area
  - Total: 10.39 km^{2} (4.01 sq mi)
- Elevation: 215 m (705 ft)

Population (2025)
  - Total: 488
- Time zone: UTC+1 (CET)
  - Summer (DST): UTC+2 (CEST)
- Postal code: 958 45
- Area code: +421 38
- Vehicle registration plate (until 2022): PE
- Website: www.obecjeskovaves.sk

Ješkova Ves (Hungarian: Jaskafalva) is a village and municipality in Partizánske District in the Trenčín Region of western Slovakia.

== History ==
In historical records the village was first mentioned in 1430.

== Geography ==
The municipality lies at an altitude of 215 metres (705 ft) and covers an area of 10.39 km^{2} (4.01 sq mi) (2025).

== Population ==
Population statistic (10 years)
Year	1995	2005	2015	2025
Count	535	510	500	488
Difference		−4.67%	−1.96%	−2.4%

Population statistic
Year	2024	2025
Count	494	488
Difference		−1.21%

It has a population of 488 people (31 December 2025).

=== Ethnicity ===
Census 2021 (1+ %)
Ethnicity	Number	Fraction
Slovak	486	97.98%
Not found out	9	1.81%
Total	496	

In year 2021 was 496 people by ethnicity 486 as Slovak, 9 as Not found out, 2 as Jewish, 2 as Czech, 2 as Other, 1 as Russian and 1 as Canadian.

Note on population: The difference values of population numbers in the table "Population statistic" and in the sections "Ethnicity" & "Religion" is caused by the use of various statistical methods.

=== Religion ===
Census 2021 (1+ %)
Religion	Number	Fraction
Roman Catholic Church	407	82.06%
None	69	13.91%
Not found out	11	2.22%
Total	496	

In year 2021 was 496 people by religion 407 from Roman Catholic Church, 69 from None, 11 from Not found out, 4 from Evangelical Church, 3 from Eastern Orthodox Church, 1 from Christian Congregations in Slovakia and 1 from Greek Catholic Church.

== Genealogical resources ==
The records for genealogical research are available at the state archive "Statny Archiv in Nitra, Slovakia"

- Roman Catholic church records (births/marriages/deaths): 1706-1919 (parish B)

== See also ==
- List of municipalities and towns in Slovakia
