= Chynorany =

- Municipality
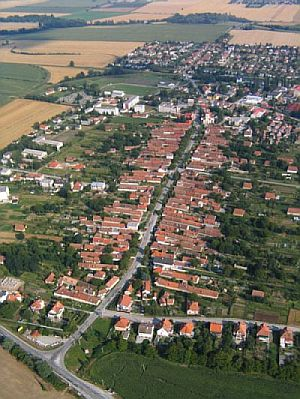

- Flag

- Location of Chynorany in the Trenčín Region Location of Chynorany in Slovakia
- Coordinates: 48.61°N 18.27°E
- Country: Slovakia
- Region: Trenčín Region
- District: Partizánske District
- First mentioned: 1387

Area
  - Total: 10.35 km^{2} (4.00 sq mi)
- Elevation: 175 m (574 ft)

Population (2025)
  - Total: 2,635
- Time zone: UTC+1 (CET)
  - Summer (DST): UTC+2 (CEST)
- Postal code: 956 33
- Area code: +421 38
- Vehicle registration plate (until 2022): PE
- Website: www.chynorany.sk

Chynorany (Hungarian: Kinorány) is a village and municipality in Partizánske District in the Trenčín Region of western Slovakia.

The village is located on the right bank of the river Nitra, approximately in the middle between the towns of Partizánske and Topoľčany. Northwest the terrain curves into the Bojice hillside, following the mountain range of Považský Inovec. To the south and east, behind the river Nitra, rises the mountain range of Tribeč.

Partizánske is 10 km northeast, Topoľčany 12 km southwest and Bánovce nad Bebravou 15 km north from Chynorany.

== Etymology ==
The name is derived from a duty to guard a local ford at early morning. Slovak: chyn-, chyniť – to pretend, to lie (here also ambush, the word is preserved e.g. in Serbian as hiniti), ran-, raný, ranný – early, morning.

== History ==
In historical records, the village was first mentioned in 1243.

== Geography ==
The municipality lies at an altitude of 175 metres (574 ft) and covers an area of 10.35 km^{2} (4.00 sq mi) (2025).

== See also ==
- List of municipalities and towns in Slovakia

== Population ==
Population statistic (10 years)
Year	1995	2005	2015	2025
Count	2780	2741	2709	2635
Difference		−1.40%	−1.16%	−2.73%

Population statistic
Year	2024	2025
Count	2661	2635
Difference		−0.97%

It has a population of 2635 people (31 December 2025).

=== Ethnicity ===
Census 2021 (1+ %)
Ethnicity	Number	Fraction
Slovak	2640	96.88%
Not found out	76	2.78%
Total	2725	

In year 2021 was 2725 people by ethnicity 2640 as Slovak, 76 as Not found out, 12 as Czech, 8 as Romani, 6 as Other, 4 as Hungarian, 3 as Jewish, 3 as Romanian, 2 as Ukrainian, 2 as Italian, 2 as Bulgarian, 1 as German, 1 as Canadian, 1 as Greek and 1 as English.

Note on population: The difference values of population numbers in the table "Population statistic" and in the sections "Ethnicity" & "Religion" is caused by the use of various statistical methods.

=== Religion ===
Census 2021 (1+ %)
Religion	Number	Fraction
Roman Catholic Church	2249	82.53%
None	308	11.3%
Not found out	77	2.83%
Total	2725	

In year 2021 was 2725 people by religion 2249 from Roman Catholic Church, 308 from None, 77 from Not found out, 25 from Evangelical Church, 17 from Apostolic Church, 14 from Greek Catholic Church, 8 from Ad hoc movements, 6 from Other and not ascertained christian church, 5 from Calvinist Church, 4 from Eastern Orthodox Church, 4 from Christian Congregations in Slovakia, 3 from Paganism and natural spirituality, 2 from Other, 1 from Jehovah's Witnesses, 1 from Islam and 1 from Buddhism.

== Genealogical resources ==
The records for genealogical research are available at the state archive in Nitra (Slovak: Štátny archív v Nitre).

- Roman Catholic church records (births/marriages/deaths): 1707–1946 (parish A)
