= Hradište, Partizánske District =

Hradište
- Municipality
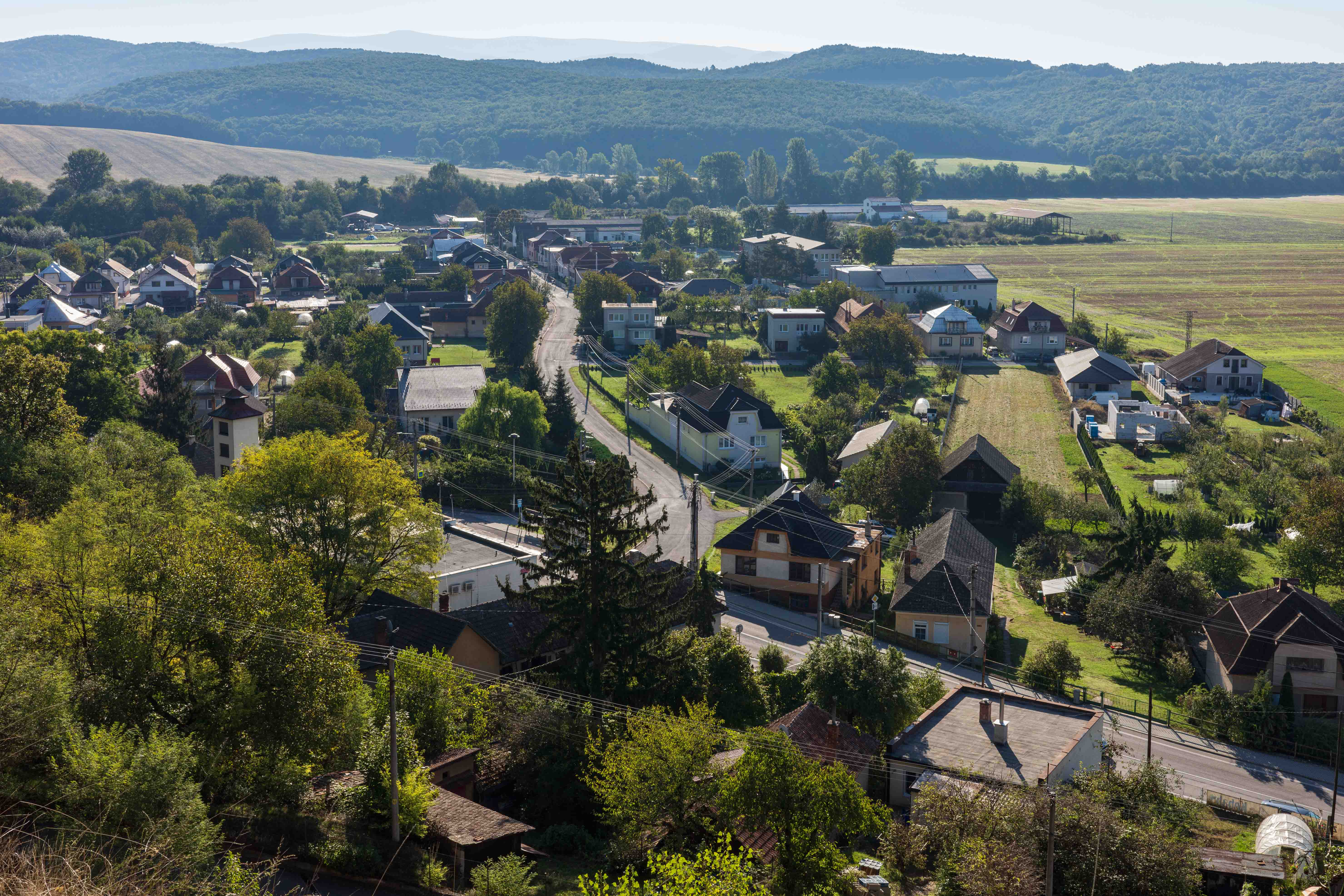

- Flag

- Location of Hradište in the Trenčín Region Location of Hradište in Slovakia
- Coordinates: 48°41′00″N 18°22′30″E
- Country: Slovakia
- Region: Trenčín Region
- District: Partizánske District
- First mentioned: 1533

Area
  - Total: 8.16 km^{2} (3.15 sq mi)
- Elevation: 212 m (696 ft)

Population (2025)
  - Total: 973
- Time zone: UTC+1 (CET)
  - Summer (DST): UTC+2 (CEST)
- Postal code: 958 54
- Area code: +421 38
- Vehicle registration plate (until 2022): PE
- Website: www.obec-hradiste.sk

Hradište (Hungarian: Sziklavárhely) is a village and municipality in Partizánske District in the Trenčín Region of western Slovakia.

== History ==
In historical records the village was first mentioned in 1533.

== Geography ==
The municipality lies at an altitude of 212 metres (696 ft) and covers an area of 8.16 km^{2} (3.15 sq mi) (2025).

== Population ==
Population statistic (10 years)
Year	1995	2005	2015	2025
Count	1075	1036	1004	973
Difference		−3.62%	−3.08%	−3.08%

Population statistic
Year	2024	2025
Count	980	973
Difference		−0.71%

It has a population of 973 people (31 December 2025).

=== Ethnicity ===
Census 2021 (1+ %)
Ethnicity	Number	Fraction
Slovak	970	96.7%
Not found out	31	3.09%
Total	1003	

In year 2021 was 1003 people by ethnicity 970 as Slovak, 31 as Not found out, 5 as Czech, 3 as Other, 2 as Italian, 2 as English, 1 as Russian, 1 as Polish and 1 as Hungarian.

Note on population: The difference values of population numbers in the table "Population statistic" and in the sections "Ethnicity" & "Religion" is caused by the use of various statistical methods.

=== Religion ===
Census 2021 (1+ %)
Religion	Number	Fraction
Roman Catholic Church	821	81.85%
None	124	12.36%
Not found out	31	3.09%
Total	1003	

In year 2021 was 1003 people by religion 821 from Roman Catholic Church, 124 from None, 31 from Not found out, 9 from Evangelical Church, 6 from Calvinist Church, 6 from Greek Catholic Church, 4 from Ad hoc movements, 1 from Christian Congregations in Slovakia and 1 from Other.

== Genealogical resources ==
The records for genealogical research are available at the state archive "Statny Archiv in Nitra, Slovakia"

- Roman Catholic church records (births/marriages/deaths): 1745-1942 (parish B)

== See also ==
- List of municipalities and towns in Slovakia
