= Krasno =

Krasno may refer to:

- Krasno, Croatia, a village near Senj
- Krasno, Russia, a village (selo) in Nizhny Novgorod Oblast, Russia
- Krasno, Slovenia, a village in the municipality of Brda
- Krásno (Sokolov District), a town in the Karlovy Vary Region, Czech Republic
- Krásno nad Bečvou, an administrative part of Valašské Meziříčí in the Zlín Region, Czech Republic
- Krásno, Partizánske District, a municipality and village in the Trenčín Region, Slovakia
- Krásno nad Kysucou, a town in the Žilina Region, Slovakia

== See also ==
- Krasna (disambiguation)
- Krasne (disambiguation)
