= Partizánske District =

Coordinates: 48°37′39″N 18°21′41″E

- District
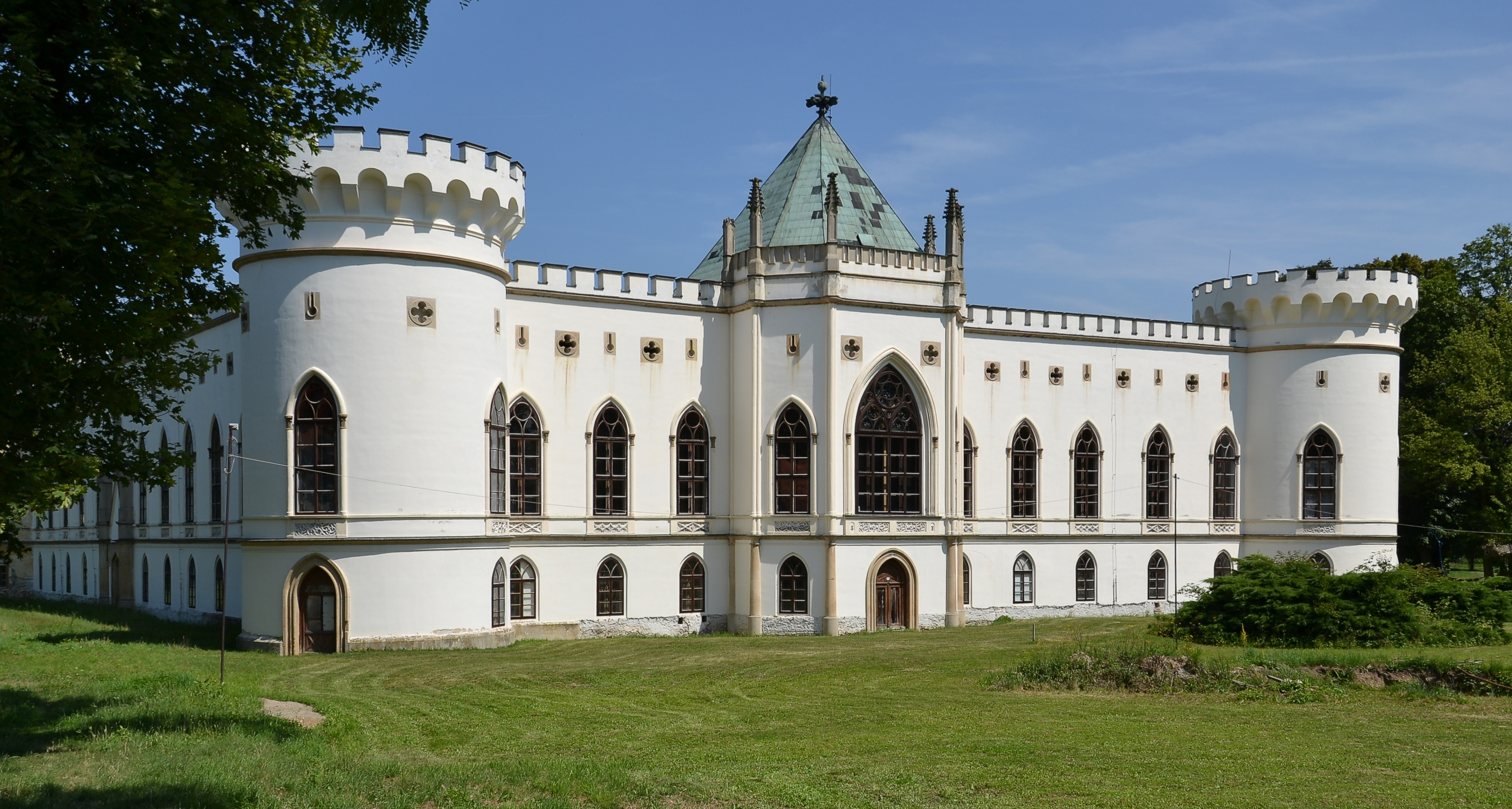
- Country: Slovakia
- Region (kraj): Trenčín Region
- Seat: Partizánske

Area
  - Total: 301.01 km^{2} (116.22 sq mi)

Population (2025)
  - Total: 42,755
- Time zone: UTC+1 (CET)
  - Summer (DST): UTC+2 (CEST)
- Telephone prefix: 038
- Vehicle registration plate (until 2022): PE
- Municipalities: 23

Partizánske District (Slovak: okres Partizánske, Hungarian: Simonyi járás) is a district in the Trenčín Region of Western Slovakia. It had been established in 1996; the district area was previously a part of Topoľčany District. Partizánske district consists of 23 municipalities, from which 1 has a town status. Its main economic and cultural center is its seat Partizánske. Industry is a dominant branch. Density of population is ca. 1.5 times higher, than average is Slovakia.

== Population ==
Population statistic (10 years)
Year	1995	2005	2015	2025
Count	48,428	47,454	46,331	42,755
Difference		−2.01%	−2.36%	−7.71%

Population statistic
Year	2024	2025
Count	43,201	42,755
Difference		−1.03%

It has a population of 42,755 people (31 December 2025).

Historical population
Year	Pop.	±%
1970	39,830	—
1980	46,761	+17.4%
1991	48,157	+3.0%
2001	48,005	−0.3%
2011	47,166	−1.7%
2021	44,515	−5.6%
Source: Statistical Office of the Slovak Republic

=== Ethnicity ===
Census 2021 (1+ %)
Ethnicity	Number	Fraction
Slovak	41,885	92.57%
Not found out	2382	5.26%
Total	45,243	

In year 2021 was 45,243 people by ethnicity 41,885 as Slovak, 2382 as Not found out, 245 as Czech, 127 as Romani, 126 as Hungarian, 125 as Other, 45 as Russian, 37 as German, 35 as Polish, 30 as Rusyn, 28 as English, 25 as Romanian, 21 as Italian, 20 as Irish, 15 as Ukrainian, 13 as Moravian, 12 as Jewish, 11 as Turkish, 10 as Vietnamese, 8 as Serbian, 7 as Austrian, 7 as French, 7 as Croatian, 5 as Greek, 4 as Chinese, 4 as Canadian, 4 as Albanian, 3 as Bulgarian and 2 as Silesian.

Note on population: The difference values of population numbers in the table "Population statistic" and in the sections "Ethnicity" & "Religion" is caused by the use of various statistical methods.

=== Religion ===
Census 2021 (1+ %)
Religion	Number	Fraction
Roman Catholic Church	30,206	67.86%
None	10,052	22.58%
Not found out	2458	5.52%
Evangelical Church	626	1.41%
Total	44,515	

In year 2021 was 44,515 people by religion 30,206 from Roman Catholic Church, 10,052 from None, 2458 from Not found out, 626 from Evangelical Church, 264 from Greek Catholic Church, 170 from Christian Congregations in Slovakia, 153 from Ad hoc movements, 112 from Other and not ascertained christian church, 100 from Other, 77 from Calvinist Church, 69 from Buddhism, 44 from Eastern Orthodox Church, 35 from Paganism and natural spirituality, 30 from Apostolic Church, 24 from Islam, 23 from Jehovah's Witnesses, 16 from United Methodist Church, 16 from Seventh-day Adventist Church, 13 from Hinduism, 9 from Jewish community, 6 from Old Catholic Church, 4 from Church of the Brethren, 3 from Czechoslovak Hussite Church, 3 from Church of Jesus Christ of Latter-day Saints and 2 from Baptists Church.

== Municipalities ==
The district has 22 municipalities.

Municipality	Area (km^{2})	Population (2023)
Bošany	14.39	3,985
Brodzany	18.29	889
Hradište	8.16	983
Chynorany	10.35	2,671
Ješkova Ves	10.39	498
Klátova Nová Ves	35.03	1,589
Kolačno	21.31	892
Krásno	3.6	520
Livina	3.22	120
Livinské Opatovce	5.01	276
Malé Kršteňany	6.29	521
Malé Uherce	5.97	853
Nadlice	5.53	593
Nedanovce	7	623
Ostratice	11.3	790
Partizánske	8.16	20,607
Pažiť	3.06	505
Skačany	15.37	1,319
Turčianky	3.73	135
Veľké Kršteňany	13.47	592
Veľké Uherce	27.78	1,998
Veľký Klíž	42.4	847
Žabokreky nad Nitrou	6.97	1,703
