= Veľký Klíž =

- Municipality
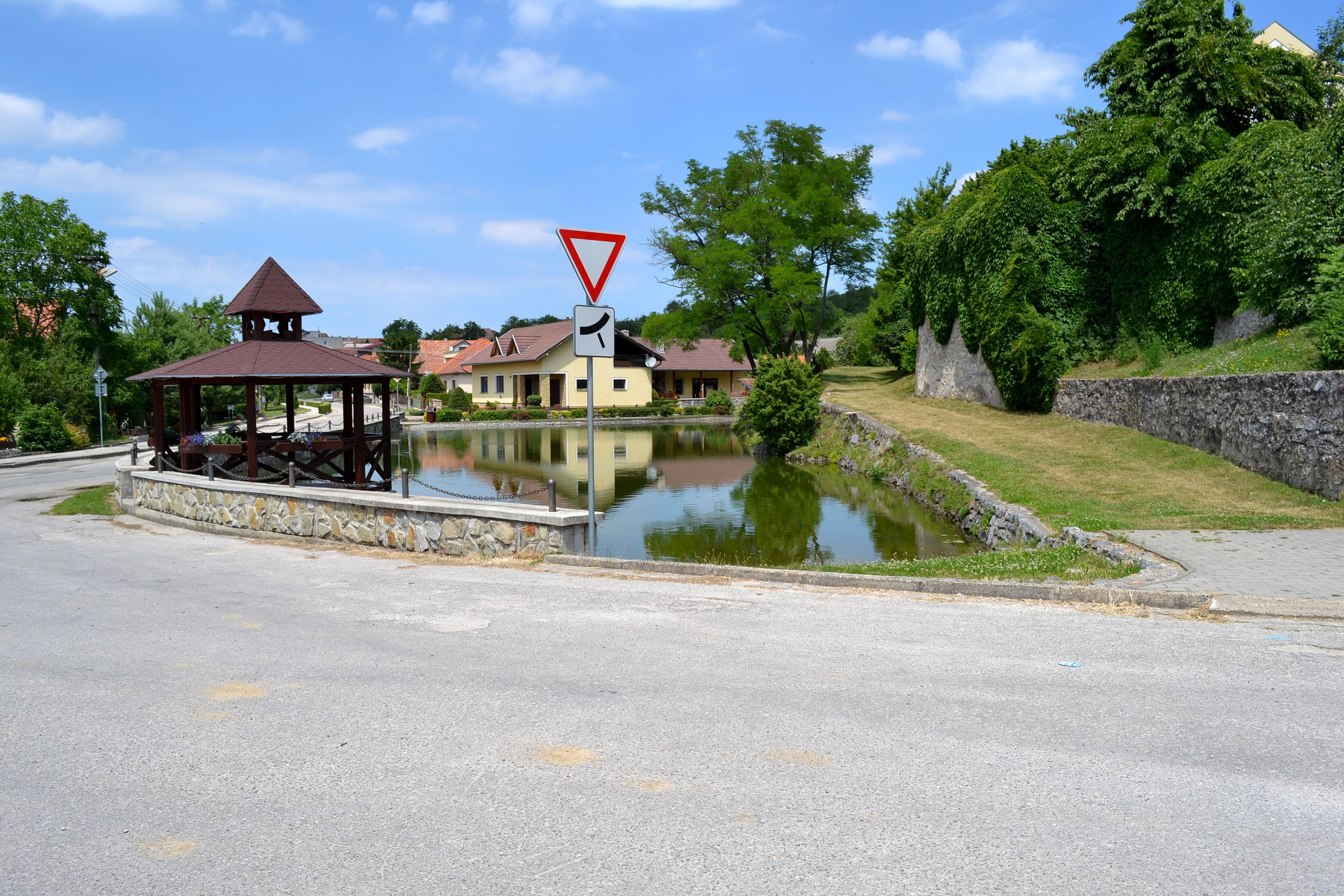

- Flag

- Location of Veľký Klíž in the Trenčín Region Location of Veľký Klíž in Slovakia
- Coordinates: 48.55°N 18.37°E
- Country: Slovakia
- Region: Trenčín Region
- District: Partizánske District
- First mentioned: 1244

Area
  - Total: 42.40 km^{2} (16.37 sq mi)
- Elevation: 244 m (801 ft)

Population (2025)
  - Total: 840
- Time zone: UTC+1 (CET)
  - Summer (DST): UTC+2 (CEST)
- Postal code: 958 45
- Area code: +421 38
- Vehicle registration plate (until 2022): PE
- Website: www.velky-kliz.sk

Veľký Klíž (Hungarian: Nagykolos) is a village and municipality in Partizánske District in the Trenčín Region of western Slovakia.

== History ==
In historical records the village was first mentioned in 1230.

== Geography ==
The municipality lies at an altitude of 244 metres (801 ft) and covers an area of 42.40 km^{2} (16.37 sq mi) (2025).

== Population ==
Population statistic (10 years)
Year	1995	2005	2015	2025
Count	1011	922	904	840
Difference		−8.80%	−1.95%	−7.07%

Population statistic
Year	2024	2025
Count	845	840
Difference		−0.59%

It has a population of 840 people (31 December 2025).

=== Ethnicity ===
Census 2021 (1+ %)
Ethnicity	Number	Fraction
Slovak	864	98.51%
Total	877	

In year 2021 was 877 people by ethnicity 864 as Slovak, 7 as Not found out, 4 as Hungarian, 3 as Austrian, 2 as Czech, 2 as English, 1 as Irish, 1 as Ukrainian, 1 as Moravian and 1 as Other.

Note on population: The difference values of population numbers in the table "Population statistic" and in the sections "Ethnicity" & "Religion" is caused by the use of various statistical methods.

=== Religion ===
Census 2021 (1+ %)
Religion	Number	Fraction
Roman Catholic Church	743	84.72%
None	90	10.26%
Total	877	

In year 2021 was 877 people by religion 743 from Roman Catholic Church, 90 from None, 8 from Not found out, 8 from Greek Catholic Church, 7 from Other, 6 from Christian Congregations in Slovakia, 4 from Calvinist Church, 4 from Ad hoc movements, 3 from Evangelical Church, 3 from Buddhism and 1 from Hinduism.
