= Malé Kršteňany =

- Municipality
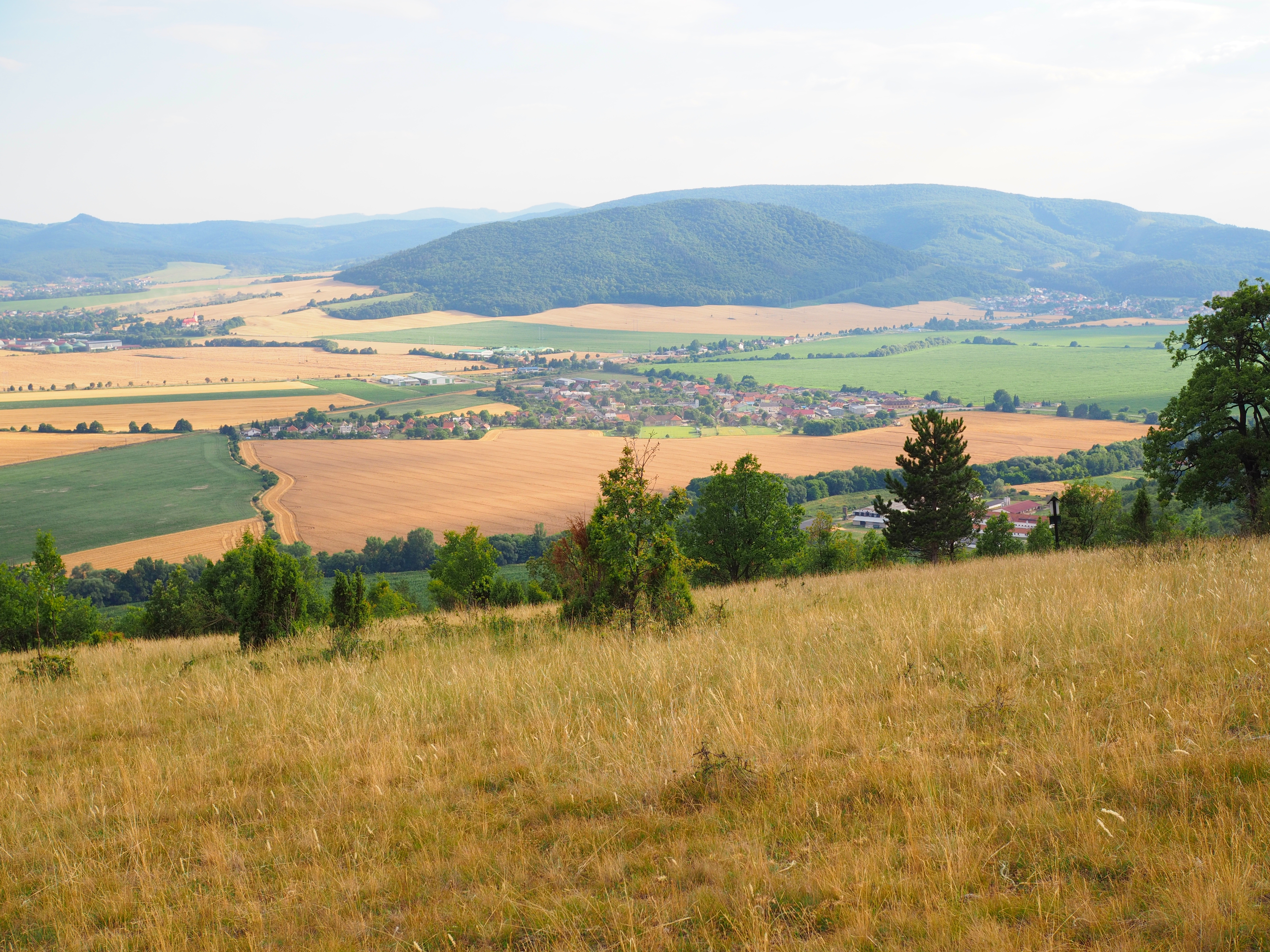

- Flag

- Location of Malé Kršteňany in the Trenčín Region Location of Malé Kršteňany in Slovakia
- Coordinates: 48.63°N 18.43°E
- Country: Slovakia
- Region: Trenčín Region
- District: Partizánske District
- First mentioned: 1271

Area
  - Total: 6.29 km^{2} (2.43 sq mi)
- Elevation: 207 m (679 ft)

Population (2025)
  - Total: 525
- Time zone: UTC+1 (CET)
  - Summer (DST): UTC+2 (CEST)
- Postal code: 958 03
- Area code: +421 38
- Vehicle registration plate (until 2022): PE
- Website: www.malekrstenany.sk

Malé Kršteňany (Hungarian: Kiskeresnye) is a village and municipality in Partizánske District in the Trenčín Region of western Slovakia.

== History ==
In historical records the village was first mentioned in 1271.

== Geography ==
The municipality lies at an altitude of 207 metres (679 ft) and covers an area of 6.29 km^{2} (2.43 sq mi) (2025).

== Population ==
Population statistic (10 years)
Year	1995	2005	2015	2025
Count	460	506	526	525
Difference		+10%	+3.95%	−0.19%

Population statistic
Year	2024	2025
Count	525	525
Difference		+0%

It has a population of 525 people (31 December 2025).

=== Ethnicity ===
Census 2021 (1+ %)
Ethnicity	Number	Fraction
Slovak	502	95.25%
Not found out	21	3.98%
Total	527	

In year 2021 was 527 people by ethnicity 502 as Slovak, 21 as Not found out, 2 as Czech, 2 as Hungarian, 2 as Other, 1 as Turkish, 1 as Silesian, 1 as Rusyn and 1 as German.

Note on population: The difference values of population numbers in the table "Population statistic" and in the sections "Ethnicity" & "Religion" is caused by the use of various statistical methods.

=== Religion ===
Census 2021 (1+ %)
Religion	Number	Fraction
Roman Catholic Church	354	67.17%
None	132	25.05%
Not found out	21	3.98%
Total	527	

In year 2021 was 527 people by religion 354 from Roman Catholic Church, 132 from None, 21 from Not found out, 3 from Other, 3 from Greek Catholic Church, 3 from Buddhism, 2 from Christian Congregations in Slovakia, 2 from Islam, 2 from Evangelical Church, 2 from Seventh-day Adventist Church, 1 from Eastern Orthodox Church, 1 from United Methodist Church and 1 from Ad hoc movements.
