= Žabokreky nad Nitrou =

- Municipality
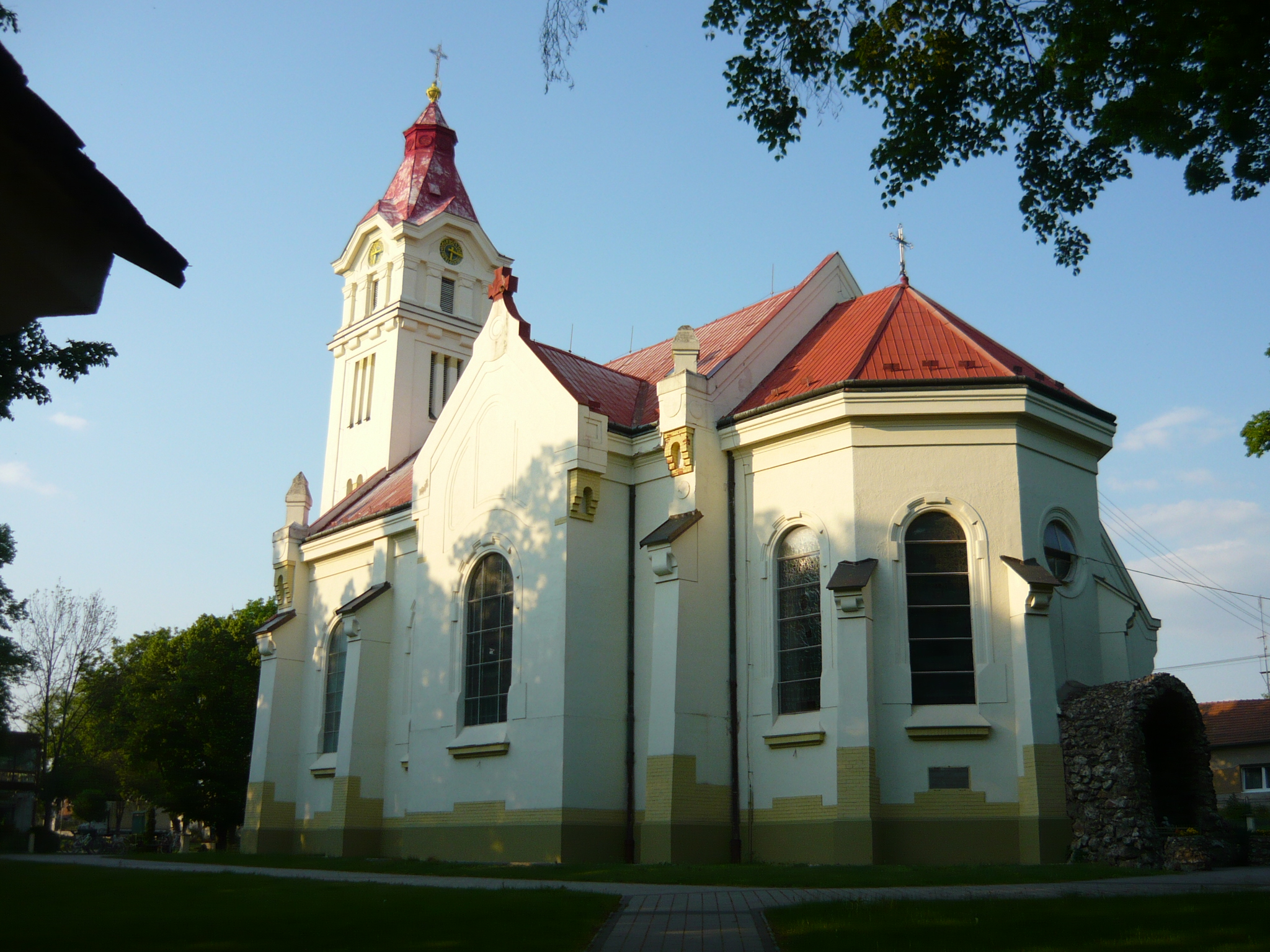

- Flag

- Location of Žabokreky nad Nitrou in the Trenčín Region Location of Žabokreky nad Nitrou in Slovakia
- Coordinates: 48.62°N 18.30°E
- Country: Slovakia
- Region: Trenčín Region
- District: Partizánske District
- First mentioned: 1291

Area
  - Total: 6.97 km^{2} (2.69 sq mi)
- Elevation: 192 m (630 ft)

Population (2025)
  - Total: 1,679
- Time zone: UTC+1 (CET)
  - Summer (DST): UTC+2 (CEST)
- Postal code: 958 52
- Area code: +421 38
- Vehicle registration plate (until 2022): PE
- Website: zabokrekynadnitrou.sk

Žabokreky nad Nitrou (Hungarian: Nyitrazsámbokrét) is a village and municipality in Partizánske District in the Trenčín Region of western Slovakia.

== History ==
In historical records the village was first mentioned in 1291.

== Geography ==
The municipality lies at an altitude of 192 metres (630 ft) and covers an area of 6.97 km^{2} (2.69 sq mi) (2025).

== Population ==
Population statistic (10 years)
Year	1995	2005	2015	2025
Count	1627	1655	1691	1679
Difference		+1.72%	+2.17%	−0.70%

Population statistic
Year	2024	2025
Count	1710	1679
Difference		−1.81%

It has a population of 1679 people (31 December 2025).

=== Ethnicity ===
Census 2021 (1+ %)
Ethnicity	Number	Fraction
Slovak	1706	98.15%
Total	1738	

In year 2021 was 1738 people by ethnicity 1706 as Slovak, 17 as Not found out, 11 as Czech, 7 as Romani, 4 as Vietnamese, 4 as Italian, 4 as German, 2 as Romanian, 2 as Other, 2 as French, 1 as Irish, 1 as Turkish, 1 as Rusyn, 1 as Russian, 1 as Hungarian and 1 as English.

Note on population: The difference values of population numbers in the table "Population statistic" and in the sections "Ethnicity" & "Religion" is caused by the use of various statistical methods.

=== Religion ===
Census 2021 (1+ %)
Religion	Number	Fraction
Roman Catholic Church	1365	78.54%
None	297	17.09%
Evangelical Church	29	1.67%
Total	1738	

In year 2021 was 1738 people by religion 1365 from Roman Catholic Church, 297 from None, 29 from Evangelical Church, 11 from Greek Catholic Church, 10 from Not found out, 7 from Ad hoc movements, 5 from Christian Congregations in Slovakia, 4 from Jehovah's Witnesses, 3 from Calvinist Church, 3 from Other, 2 from Apostolic Church, 1 from Paganism and natural spirituality and 1 from Islam.
