= Veľké Kršteňany =

- Municipality
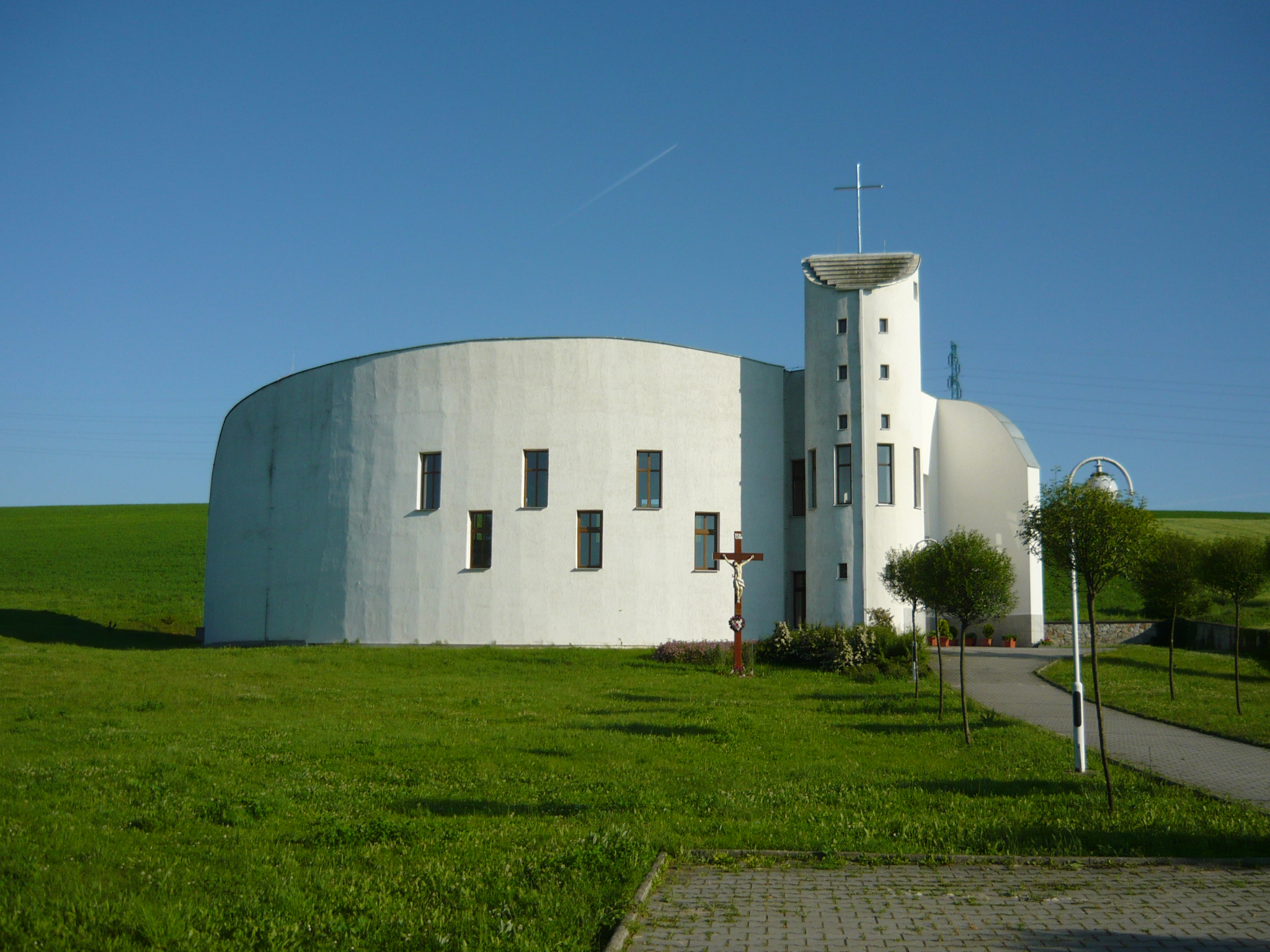
- Sts. Cyril and Methodius Church

- Flag

- Location of Veľké Kršteňany in the Trenčín Region Location of Veľké Kršteňany in Slovakia
- Coordinates: 48.65°N 18.42°E
- Country: Slovakia
- Region: Trenčín Region
- District: Partizánske District
- First mentioned: 1271

Area
  - Total: 13.47 km^{2} (5.20 sq mi)
- Elevation: 215 m (705 ft)

Population (2025)
  - Total: 583
- Time zone: UTC+1 (CET)
  - Summer (DST): UTC+2 (CEST)
- Postal code: 958 03
- Area code: +421 38
- Vehicle registration plate (until 2022): PE
- Website: www.velkekrstenany.eu

Veľké Kršteňany (Hungarian: Nagykeresnye) is a village and municipality in Partizánske District in the Trenčín Region of western Slovakia.

== History ==
In historical records the village was first mentioned in 1271. On May 13. 1908, Pavol Gašparovič Hlbina, a Slovak poet, priest and translator was born here.

== Geography ==
The municipality lies at an altitude of 215 metres (705 ft) and covers an area of 13.47 km^{2} (5.20 sq mi) (2025).

== Population ==
Population statistic (10 years)
Year	1995	2005	2015	2025
Count	588	632	604	583
Difference		+7.48%	−4.43%	−3.47%

Population statistic
Year	2024	2025
Count	574	583
Difference		+1.56%

It has a population of 583 people (31 December 2025).

=== Ethnicity ===
Census 2021 (1+ %)
Ethnicity	Number	Fraction
Slovak	565	94.16%
Not found out	31	5.16%
Czech	6	1%
Total	600	

In year 2021 was 600 people by ethnicity 565 as Slovak, 31 as Not found out, 6 as Czech, 4 as Ukrainian, 4 as Romani, 2 as Rusyn, 1 as Russian, 1 as German and 1 as Moravian.

Note on population: The difference values of population numbers in the table "Population statistic" and in the sections "Ethnicity" & "Religion" is caused by the use of various statistical methods.

=== Religion ===
Census 2021 (1+ %)
Religion	Number	Fraction
Roman Catholic Church	447	74.5%
None	102	17%
Not found out	35	5.83%
Total	600	

In year 2021 was 600 people by religion 447 from Roman Catholic Church, 102 from None, 35 from Not found out, 4 from Other, 3 from Greek Catholic Church, 2 from Calvinist Church, 2 from Eastern Orthodox Church, 2 from Apostolic Church, 2 from Ad hoc movements and 1 from Evangelical Church.
