= Nadlice =

- Municipality
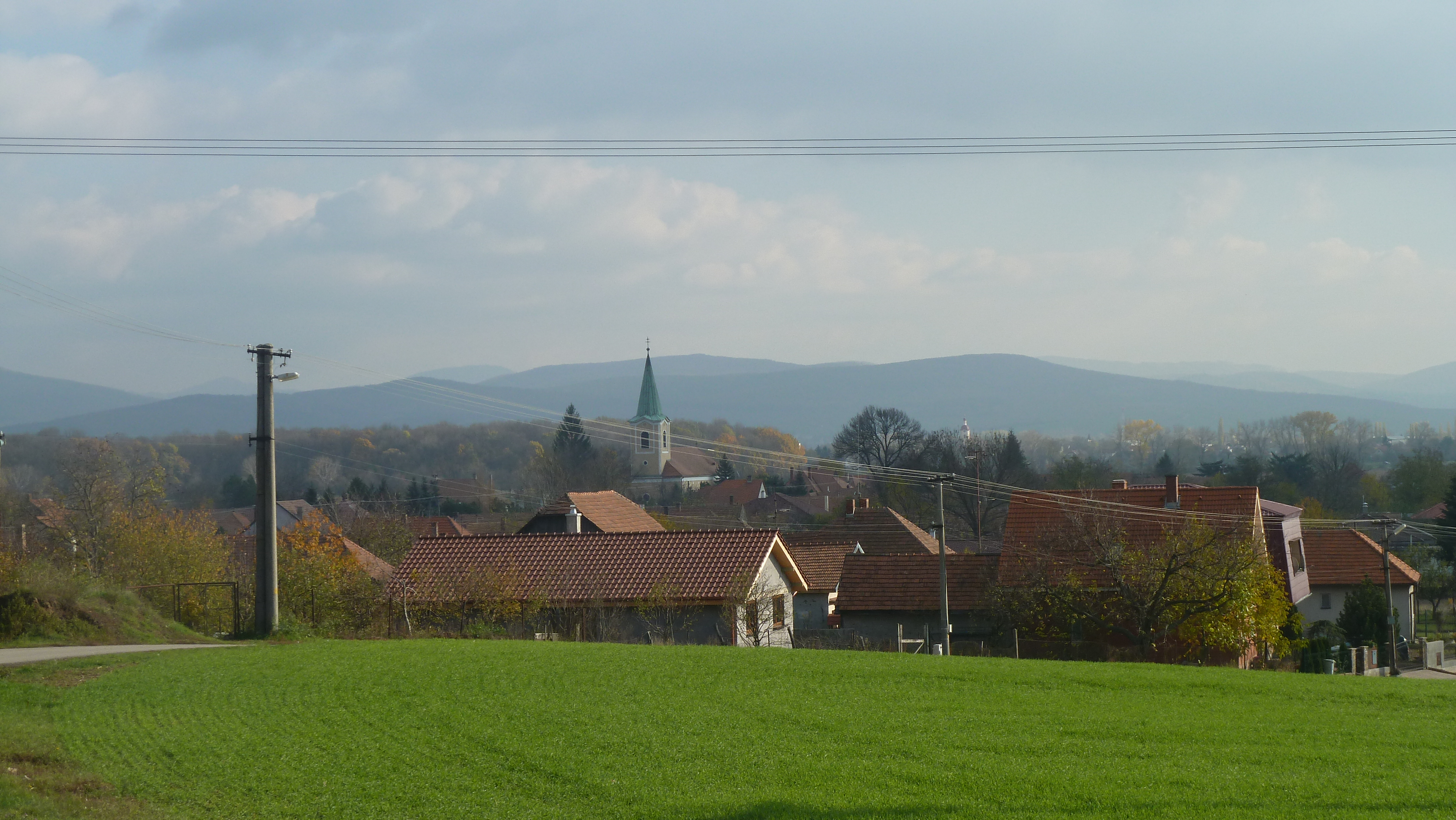

- Flag

- Location of Nadlice in the Trenčín Region Location of Nadlice in Slovakia
- Coordinates: 48.62°N 18.25°E
- Country: Slovakia
- Region: Trenčín Region
- District: Partizánske District
- First mentioned: 1113

Area
  - Total: 5.53 km^{2} (2.14 sq mi)
- Elevation: 182 m (597 ft)

Population (2025)
  - Total: 581
- Time zone: UTC+1 (CET)
  - Summer (DST): UTC+2 (CEST)
- Postal code: 956 32
- Area code: +421 38
- Vehicle registration plate (until 2022): PE
- Website: www.nadlice.sk

Nadlice (Hungarian: Nádlány) is a village and municipality in Partizánske District in the Trenčín Region of western Slovakia.

== History ==
In historical records the village was first mentioned in 1113.

== Geography ==
The municipality lies at an altitude of 182 metres (597 ft) and covers an area of 5.53 km^{2} (2.14 sq mi) (2025).

== Population ==
Population statistic (10 years)
Year	1995	2005	2015	2025
Count	611	632	629	581
Difference		+3.43%	−0.47%	−7.63%

Population statistic
Year	2024	2025
Count	584	581
Difference		−0.51%

It has a population of 581 people (31 December 2025).

=== Ethnicity ===
Census 2021 (1+ %)
Ethnicity	Number	Fraction
Slovak	583	98.14%
Not found out	10	1.68%
Total	594	

In year 2021 was 594 people by ethnicity 583 as Slovak, 10 as Not found out, 2 as Romani, 1 as Italian, 1 as Serbian, 1 as Rusyn, 1 as Polish, 1 as German and 1 as Moravian.

Note on population: The difference values of population numbers in the table "Population statistic" and in the sections "Ethnicity" & "Religion" is caused by the use of various statistical methods.

=== Religion ===
Census 2021 (1+ %)
Religion	Number	Fraction
Roman Catholic Church	500	84.18%
None	65	10.94%
Not found out	14	2.36%
Total	594	

In year 2021 was 594 people by religion 500 from Roman Catholic Church, 65 from None, 14 from Not found out, 4 from Greek Catholic Church, 3 from Evangelical Church, 2 from Seventh-day Adventist Church, 2 from Ad hoc movements, 1 from Calvinist Church, 1 from Eastern Orthodox Church, 1 from Christian Congregations in Slovakia and 1 from Other.

== Notable people ==
- Nikola Rybanská (born 1995), footballer
