= Klátova Nová Ves =

- Municipality
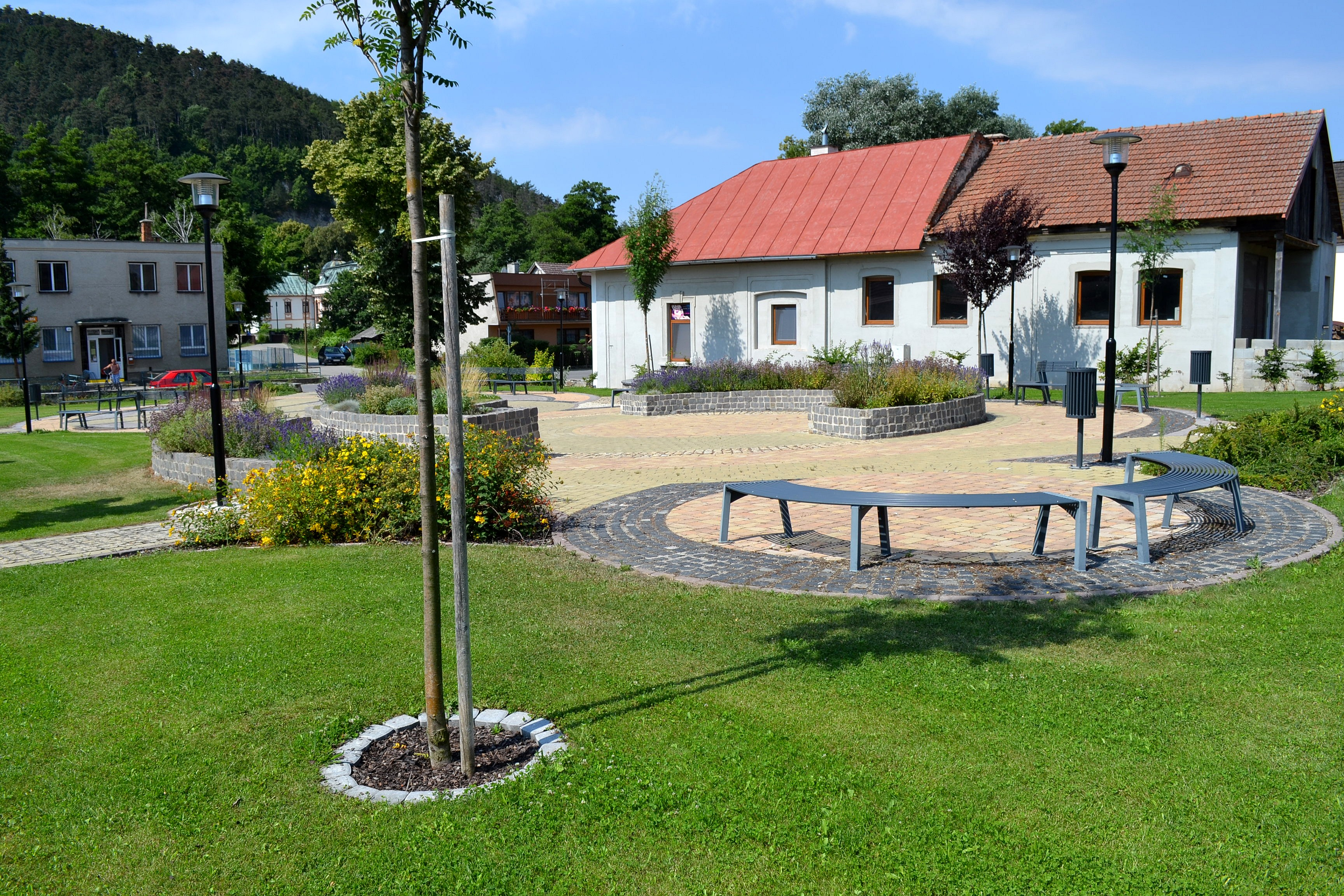

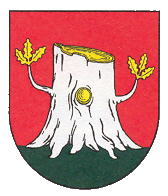
- Flag Coat of arms

- Location of Klátova Nová Ves in the Trenčín Region Location of Klátova Nová Ves in Slovakia
- Coordinates: 48.57°N 18.30°E
- Country: Slovakia
- Region: Trenčín Region
- District: Partizánske District
- First mentioned: 1310

Area
  - Total: 35.03 km^{2} (13.53 sq mi)
- Elevation: 198 m (650 ft)

Population (2025)
  - Total: 1,582
- Time zone: UTC+1 (CET)
  - Summer (DST): UTC+2 (CEST)
- Postal code: 958 44
- Area code: +421 38
- Vehicle registration plate (until 2022): PE
- Website: www.klatovanovaves.sk

Klátova Nová Ves (German: Stockneudorf; Hungarian: Tőkésújfalu) is a village and municipality in Partizánske District in the Trenčín Region of western Slovakia. It was named until 1927 Klatnovejsa.

== History ==
In historical records the village was first mentioned in 1310. It belonged to the Kingdom of Hungary until 1918.

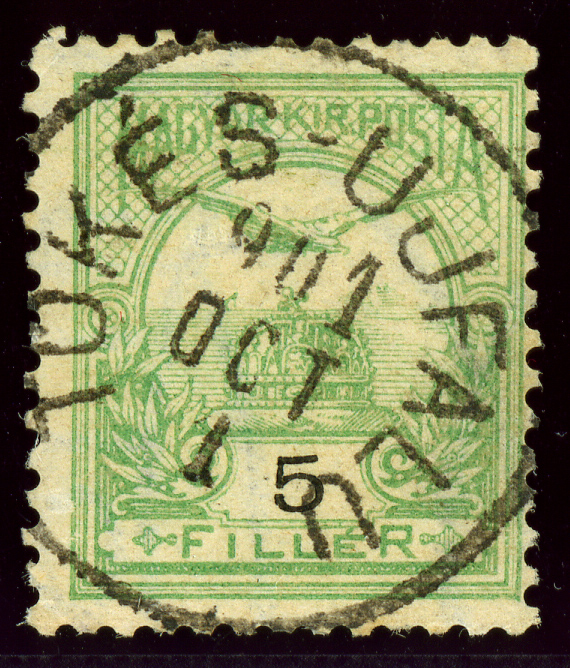
Hungarian stamp cancelled Tőkés-Ujfalu in 1901

== Geography ==
The municipality lies at an altitude of 198 metres (650 ft) and covers an area of 35.03 km^{2} (13.53 sq mi) (2025).

== Population ==
Population statistic (10 years)
Year	1995	2005	2015	2025
Count	1562	1585	1669	1582
Difference		+1.47%	+5.29%	−5.21%

Population statistic
Year	2024	2025
Count	1596	1582
Difference		−0.87%

It has a population of 1582 people (31 December 2025).

=== Ethnicity ===
Census 2021 (1+ %)
Ethnicity	Number	Fraction
Slovak	1578	97.95%
Not found out	29	1.8%
Total	1611	

In year 2021 was 1611 people by ethnicity 1578 as Slovak, 29 as Not found out, 9 as Czech, 6 as Romanian, 4 as Turkish, 4 as German, 3 as Russian, 3 as Hungarian, 2 as Romani, 2 as Other, 1 as Ukrainian, 1 as Rusyn and 1 as English.

Note on population: The difference values of population numbers in the table "Population statistic" and in the sections "Ethnicity" & "Religion" is caused by the use of various statistical methods.

=== Religion ===
Census 2021 (1+ %)
Religion	Number	Fraction
Roman Catholic Church	1259	78.15%
None	289	17.94%
Not found out	18	1.12%
Evangelical Church	18	1.12%
Total	1611	

In year 2021 was 1611 people by religion 1259 from Roman Catholic Church, 289 from None, 18 from Not found out, 18 from Evangelical Church, 11 from Ad hoc movements, 4 from Greek Catholic Church, 3 from Christian Congregations in Slovakia, 2 from Paganism and natural spirituality, 2 from United Methodist Church, 2 from Buddhism, 1 from Calvinist Church, 1 from Eastern Orthodox Church and 1 from Islam.

== Genealogical resources ==
The records for genealogical research are available at the state archive "Statny Archiv in Nitra, Slovakia"

- Roman Catholic church records (births/marriages/deaths): 1726-1901 (parish A)
- Lutheran church records (births/marriages/deaths): 1708-1895 (parish B)

== See also ==
- List of municipalities and towns in Slovakia
