= Kolačno =

- Municipality
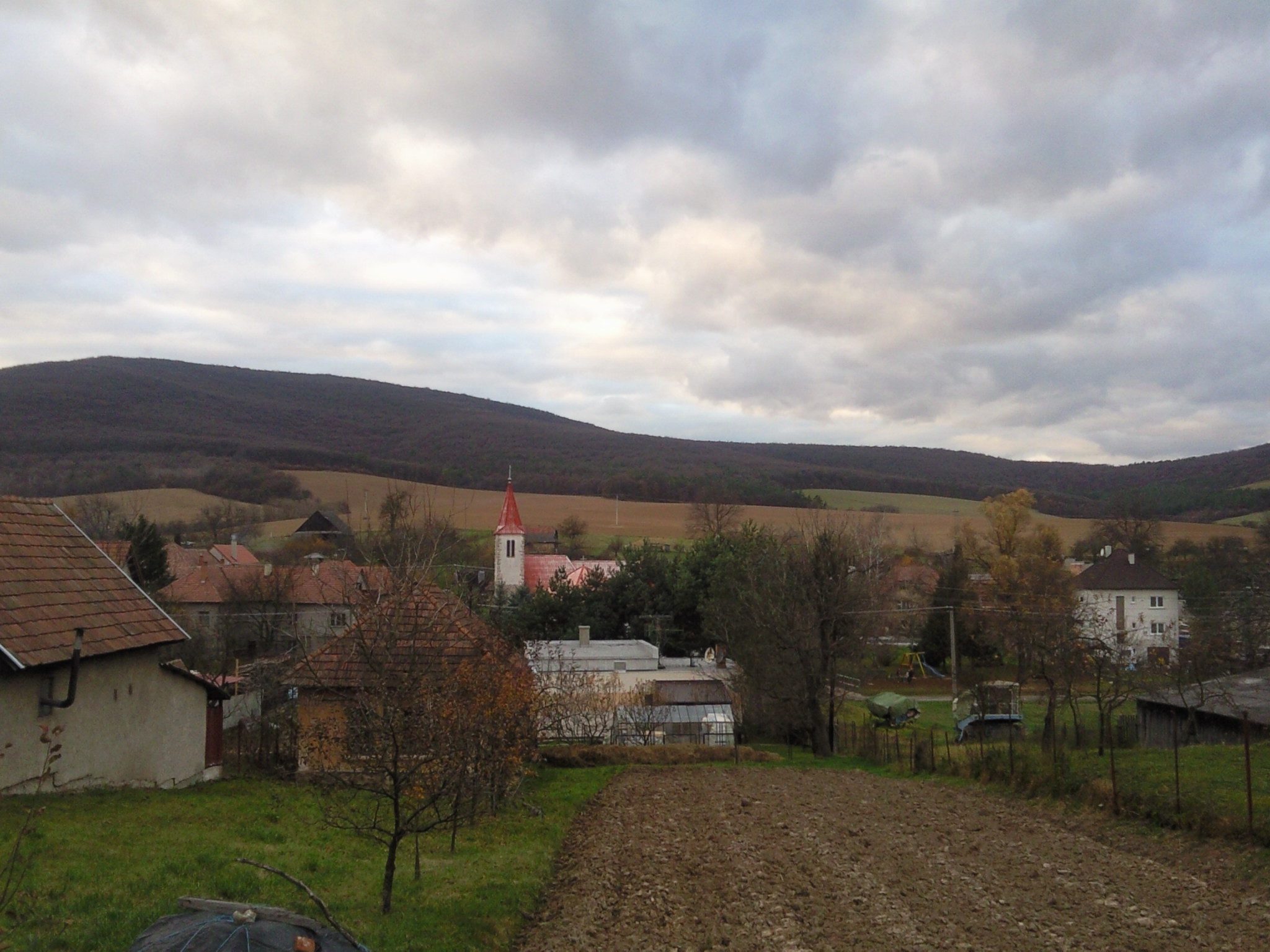

- Flag

- Location of Kolačno in the Trenčín Region Location of Kolačno in Slovakia
- Coordinates: 48.60°N 18.43°E
- Country: Slovakia
- Region: Trenčín Region
- District: Partizánske District
- First mentioned: 1293

Area
  - Total: 21.31 km^{2} (8.23 sq mi)
- Elevation: 238 m (781 ft)

Population (2025)
  - Total: 897
- Time zone: UTC+1 (CET)
  - Summer (DST): UTC+2 (CEST)
- Postal code: 958 41
- Area code: +421 38
- Vehicle registration plate (until 2022): PE
- Website: www.kolacno.sk

Kolačno (Hungarian: Kalacsna) is a village and municipality in Partizánske District in the Trenčín Region of western Slovakia.

== History ==
In historical records the village was first mentioned in 1293.

== Geography ==
The municipality lies at an altitude of 238 metres (781 ft) and covers an area of 21.31 km^{2} (8.23 sq mi) (2025).

== Population ==
Population statistic (10 years)
Year	1995	2005	2015	2025
Count	903	862	873	897
Difference		−4.54%	+1.27%	+2.74%

Population statistic
Year	2024	2025
Count	899	897
Difference		−0.22%

It has a population of 897 people (31 December 2025).

=== Ethnicity ===
Census 2021 (1+ %)
Ethnicity	Number	Fraction
Slovak	880	99.43%
Total	885	

In year 2021 was 885 people by ethnicity 880 as Slovak, 6 as Not found out, 4 as Czech, 2 as Polish, 2 as Other, 1 as Romani and 1 as Hungarian.

Note on population: The difference values of population numbers in the table "Population statistic" and in the sections "Ethnicity" & "Religion" is caused by the use of various statistical methods.

=== Religion ===
Census 2021 (1+ %)
Religion	Number	Fraction
Roman Catholic Church	730	82.49%
None	138	15.59%
Total	885	

In year 2021 was 885 people by religion 730 from Roman Catholic Church, 138 from None, 5 from Other, 3 from Not found out, 2 from Christian Congregations in Slovakia, 2 from Greek Catholic Church, 2 from Ad hoc movements, 1 from Calvinist Church, 1 from Paganism and natural spirituality and 1 from Buddhism.

== Genealogical resources ==
The records for genealogical research are available at the state archive "Statny Archiv in Nitra, Slovakia"

- Roman Catholic church records (births/marriages/deaths): 1706-1901 (parish B)

== See also ==
- List of municipalities and towns in Slovakia
