= Livinské Opatovce =

- Municipality
- Flag

- Location of Livinské Opatovce in the Trenčín Region Location of Livinské Opatovce in Slovakia
- Coordinates: 48.65°N 18.23°E
- Country: Slovakia
- Region: Trenčín Region
- District: Partizánske District
- First mentioned: 1340

Area
  - Total: 5.01 km^{2} (1.93 sq mi)
- Elevation: 193 m (633 ft)

Population (2025)
  - Total: 272
- Time zone: UTC+1 (CET)
  - Summer (DST): UTC+2 (CEST)
- Postal code: 956 32
- Area code: +421 38
- Vehicle registration plate (until 2022): PE
- Website: www.livinskeopatovce.sk

Livinské Opatovce (Hungarian: Apátléva) is a village and municipality in Partizánske District in the Trenčín Region of western Slovakia.

== History ==
In historical records the village was first mentioned in 1340.

== Geography ==
The municipality lies at an altitude of 193 metres (633 ft) and covers an area of 5.01 km^{2} (1.93 sq mi) (2025).

== Population ==
Population statistic (10 years)
Year	1995	2005	2015	2025
Count	251	236	243	272
Difference		−5.97%	+2.96%	+11.93%

Population statistic
Year	2024	2025
Count	278	272
Difference		−2.15%

It has a population of 272 people (31 December 2025).

=== Ethnicity ===
Census 2021 (1+ %)
Ethnicity	Number	Fraction
Slovak	279	98.58%
Total	283	

In year 2021 was 283 people by ethnicity 279 as Slovak, 2 as Czech, 2 as Romanian, 2 as Not found out and 1 as Other.

Note on population: The difference values of population numbers in the table "Population statistic" and in the sections "Ethnicity" & "Religion" is caused by the use of various statistical methods.

=== Religion ===
Census 2021 (1+ %)
Religion	Number	Fraction
Roman Catholic Church	265	93.64%
None	12	4.24%
Not found out	3	1.06%
Total	283	

In year 2021 was 283 people by religion 265 from Roman Catholic Church, 12 from None, 3 from Not found out, 2 from Evangelical Church and 1 from Buddhism.
