= Ostratice =

- Municipality
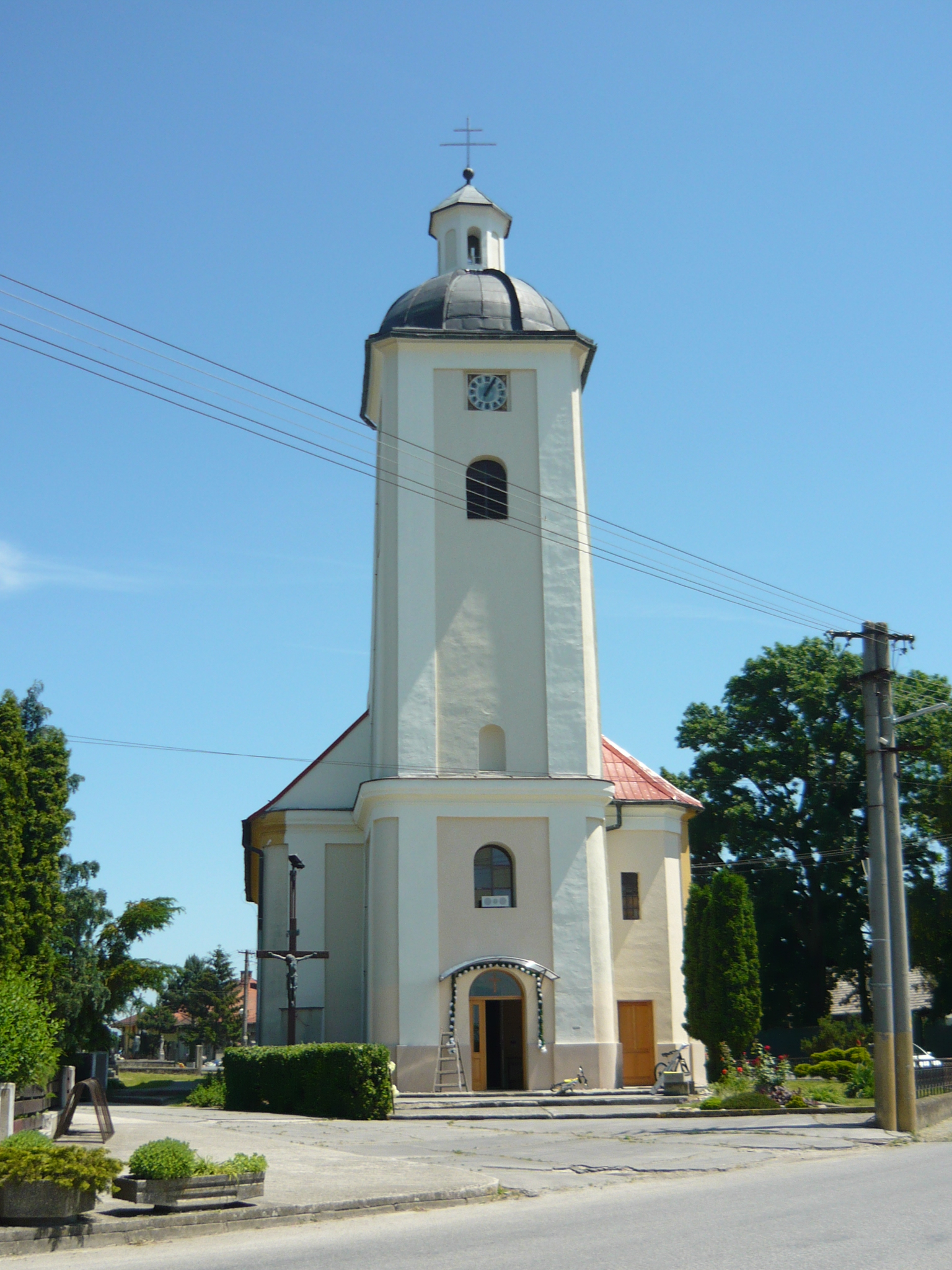
- St. Peter and St. Paul's Church

- Flag

- Location of Ostratice in the Trenčín Region Location of Ostratice in Slovakia
- Coordinates: 48.64°N 18.28°E
- Country: Slovakia
- Region: Trenčín Region
- District: Partizánske District
- First mentioned: 1439

Area
  - Total: 11.30 km^{2} (4.36 sq mi)
- Elevation: 182 m (597 ft)

Population (2025)
  - Total: 771
- Time zone: UTC+1 (CET)
  - Summer (DST): UTC+2 (CEST)
- Postal code: 956 34
- Area code: +421 38
- Vehicle registration plate (until 2022): PE
- Website: www.obecostratice.sk

Ostratice (Hungarian: Sándori) is a village and municipality in Partizánske District in the Trenčín Region of western Slovakia.

== History ==
In historical records the village was first mentioned in 1439.

== Geography ==
The municipality lies at an altitude of 182 metres (597 ft) and covers an area of 11.30 km^{2} (4.36 sq mi) (2025).

== Population ==
Population statistic (10 years)
| Year | 1995 | 2005 | 2015 | 2025 |
|---|---|---|---|---|
| Count | 759 | 814 | 822 | 771 |
| Difference | | +7.24% | +0.98% | −6.20% |

Population statistic
| Year | 2024 | 2025 |
|---|---|---|
| Count | 779 | 771 |
| Difference | | −1.02% |

It has a population of 771 people (31 December 2025).

=== Ethnicity ===
Census 2021 (1+ %)
| Ethnicity | Number | Fraction |
|---|---|---|
| Slovak | 760 | 97.93% |
| Not found out | 14 | 1.8% |
| Total | 776 | |

In year 2021 was 776 people by ethnicity 760 as Slovak, 14 as Not found out, 3 as Czech, 2 as Turkish, 1 as Rusyn, 1 as Romanian, 1 as Polish, 1 as German, 1 as Hungarian and 1 as Other.

Note on population: The difference values of population numbers in the table "Population statistic" and in the sections "Ethnicity" & "Religion" is caused by the use of various statistical methods.

=== Religion ===
Census 2021 (1+ %)
| Religion | Number | Fraction |
|---|---|---|
| Roman Catholic Church | 682 | 87.89% |
| None | 64 | 8.25% |
| Not found out | 10 | 1.29% |
| Greek Catholic Church | 8 | 1.03% |
| Total | 776 | |

In year 2021 was 776 people by religion 682 from Roman Catholic Church, 64 from None, 10 from Not found out, 8 from Greek Catholic Church, 7 from Evangelical Church, 1 from Eastern Orthodox Church, 1 from Christian Congregations in Slovakia, 1 from Islam, 1 from United Methodist Church and 1 from Buddhism.
