= Malé Uherce =

- Municipality
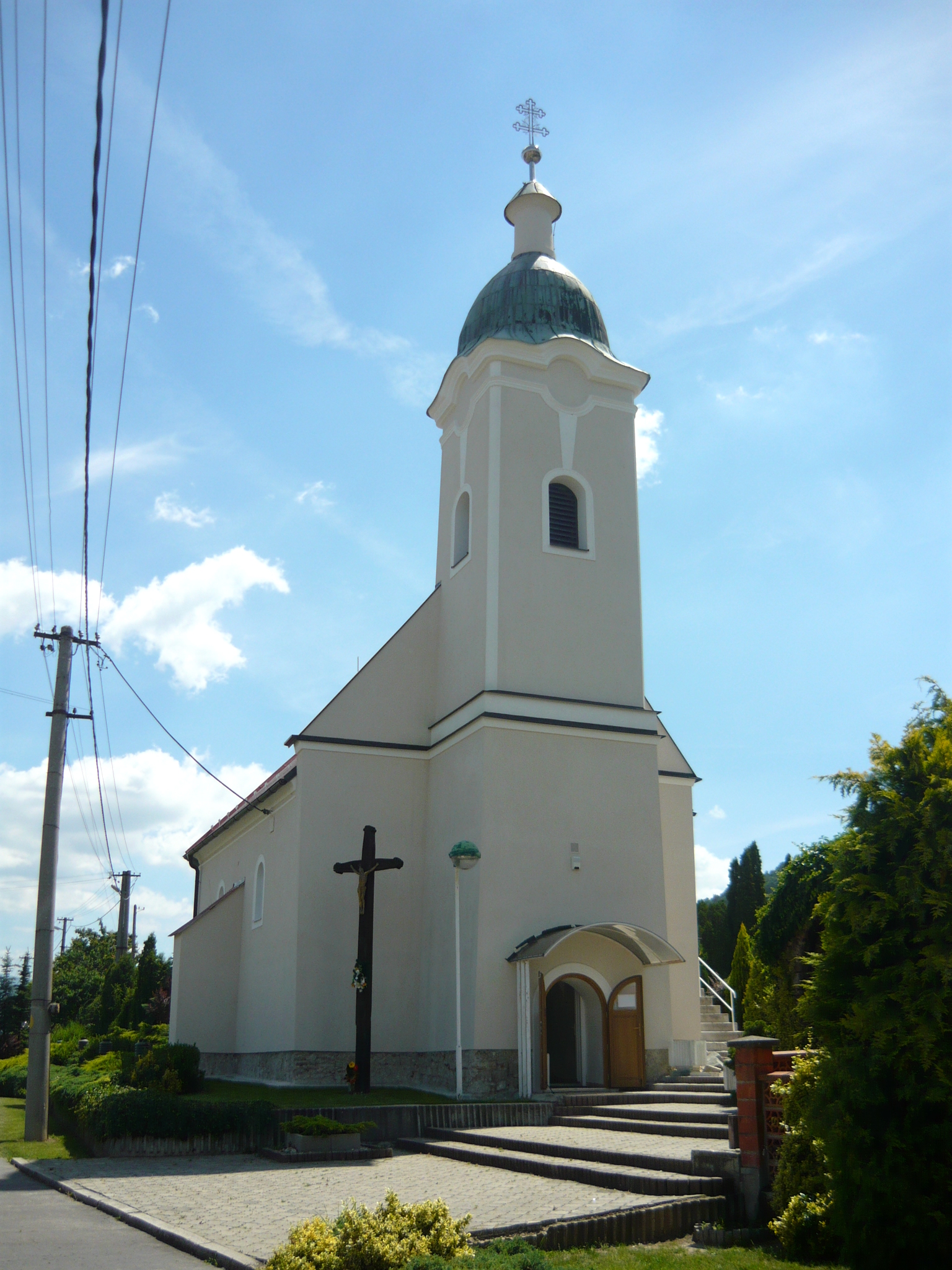

- Flag

- Location of Malé Uherce in the Trenčín Region Location of Malé Uherce in Slovakia
- Coordinates: 48.62°N 18.40°E
- Country: Slovakia
- Region: Trenčín Region
- District: Partizánske District
- First mentioned: 1274

Area
  - Total: 5.97 km^{2} (2.31 sq mi)
- Elevation: 211 m (692 ft)

Population (2025)
  - Total: 857
- Time zone: UTC+1 (CET)
  - Summer (DST): UTC+2 (CEST)
- Postal code: 958 03
- Area code: +421 38
- Vehicle registration plate (until 2022): PE
- Website: www.maleuherce.sk

Malé Uherce (Hungarian: Kisugróc) is a village and municipality in Partizánske District in the Trenčín Region of western Slovakia.

== History ==
the village was first mentioned In historical records in 1274.

== Geography ==
The municipality lies at an altitude of 211 metres (692 ft) and covers an area of 5.97 km^{2} (2.31 sq mi) (2025).

== Population ==
Population statistic (10 years)
Year	1995	2005	2015	2025
Count	711	714	713	857
Difference		+0.42%	−0.14%	+20.19%

Population statistic
Year	2024	2025
Count	859	857
Difference		−0.23%

It has a population of 857 people (31 December 2025).

=== Ethnicity ===
Census 2021 (1+ %)
Ethnicity	Number	Fraction
Slovak	778	98.1%
Not found out	13	1.63%
Total	793	

In year 2021 was 793 people by ethnicity 778 as Slovak, 13 as Not found out, 5 as Czech, 4 as French, 4 as Croatian, 2 as Hungarian, 1 as Romani and 1 as Other.

Note on population: The difference values of population numbers in the table "Population statistic" and in the sections "Ethnicity" & "Religion" is caused by the use of various statistical methods.

=== Religion ===
Census 2021 (1+ %)
Religion	Number	Fraction
Roman Catholic Church	545	68.73%
None	205	25.85%
Evangelical Church	15	1.89%
Not found out	10	1.26%
Total	793	

In year 2021 was 793 people by religion 545 from Roman Catholic Church, 205 from None, 15 from Evangelical Church, 10 from Not found out, 4 from Christian Congregations in Slovakia, 3 from Greek Catholic Church, 3 from Ad hoc movements, 2 from Other, 2 from Seventh-day Adventist Church, 2 from Buddhism, 1 from Calvinist Church and 1 from Other and not ascertained christian church.
