= Krasna =

Krasna or Krásná may refer to places:

== Czech Republic ==
- Krásná (Cheb District), a municipality and village in the Karlovy Vary Region
- Krásná (Frýdek-Místek District), a municipality and village in the Moravian-Silesian Region
- Krásná, a village and part of Kraslice in the Karlovy Vary Region
- Krásná, a village and part of Pěnčín (Jablonec nad Nisou District) in the Liberec Region

== Poland ==
- Krasna, Cieszyn, a district of Cieszyn
- Krasna, Masovian Voivodeship, east-central Poland
- Krasna, Subcarpathian Voivodeship, south-east Poland
- Krasna, Świętokrzyskie Voivodeship, south-central Poland
- Krasna, West Pomeranian Voivodeship, north-west Poland

== Elsewhere ==
- Krásna, a borough of Košice, Slovakia
- Krasna, Slovenia, a village
- Krasna, Nadvirna Raion, a village in Ukraine

== See also ==
- Krasne (disambiguation)
- Krasno (disambiguation)
