= Pažiť =

- Municipality
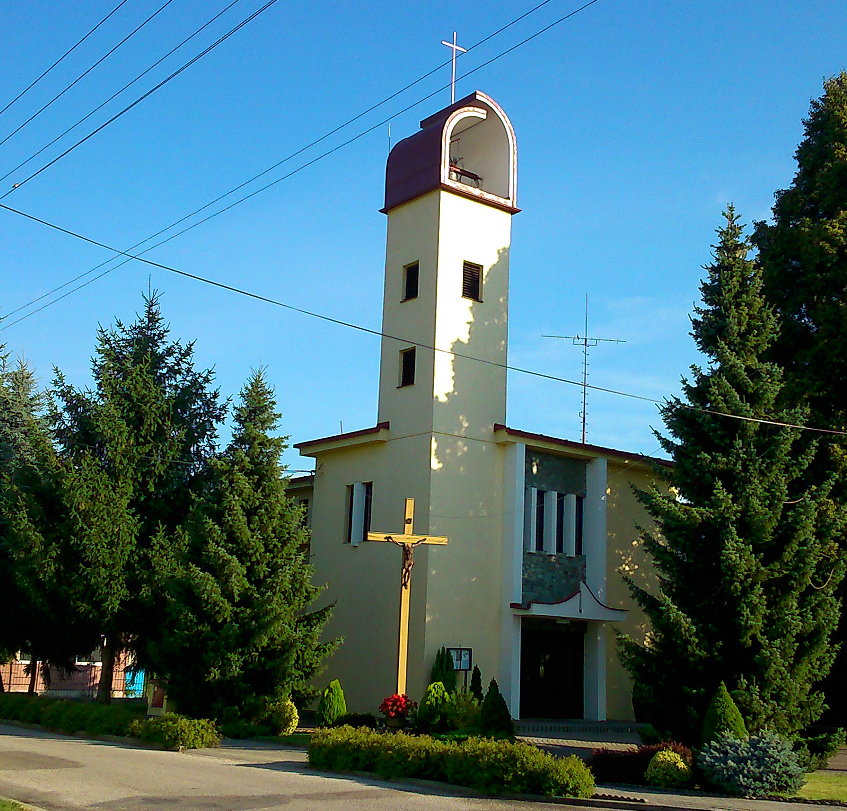

- Flag

- Location of Pažiť in the Trenčín Region Location of Pažiť in Slovakia
- Coordinates: 48.63°N 18.43°E
- Country: Slovakia
- Region: Trenčín Region
- District: Partizánske District
- First mentioned: 1351

Area
  - Total: 3.06 km^{2} (1.18 sq mi)
- Elevation: 202 m (663 ft)

Population (2025)
  - Total: 504
- Time zone: UTC+1 (CET)
  - Summer (DST): UTC+2 (CEST)
- Postal code: 958 03
- Area code: +421 38
- Vehicle registration plate (until 2022): PE
- Website: www.obecpazit.sk

Pažiť (Hungarian: Pázsit) is a village and municipality in Partizánske District in the Trenčín Region of western Slovakia.

== History ==
In historical records the village was first mentioned in 1351.

== Geography ==
The municipality lies at an altitude of 202 metres (663 ft) and covers an area of 3.06 km^{2} (1.18 sq mi) (2025).

== Population ==
Population statistic (10 years)
Year	1995	2005	2015	2025
Count	330	409	458	504
Difference		+23.93%	+11.98%	+10.04%

Population statistic
Year	2024	2025
Count	502	504
Difference		+0.39%

It has a population of 504 people (31 December 2025).

=== Ethnicity ===
Census 2021 (1+ %)
Ethnicity	Number	Fraction
Slovak	490	97.22%
Not found out	12	2.38%
Total	504	

In year 2021 was 504 people by ethnicity 490 as Slovak, 12 as Not found out, 5 as Czech, 3 as Other and 1 as Romani.

Note on population: The difference values of population numbers in the table "Population statistic" and in the sections "Ethnicity" & "Religion" is caused by the use of various statistical methods.

=== Religion ===
Census 2021 (1+ %)
Religion	Number	Fraction
Roman Catholic Church	336	66.67%
None	127	25.2%
Not found out	17	3.37%
Greek Catholic Church	12	2.38%
Evangelical Church	8	1.59%
Total	504	

In year 2021 was 504 people by religion 336 from Roman Catholic Church, 127 from None, 17 from Not found out, 12 from Greek Catholic Church, 8 from Evangelical Church, 2 from Other and 2 from Ad hoc movements.
