= Bošany =

- Municipality
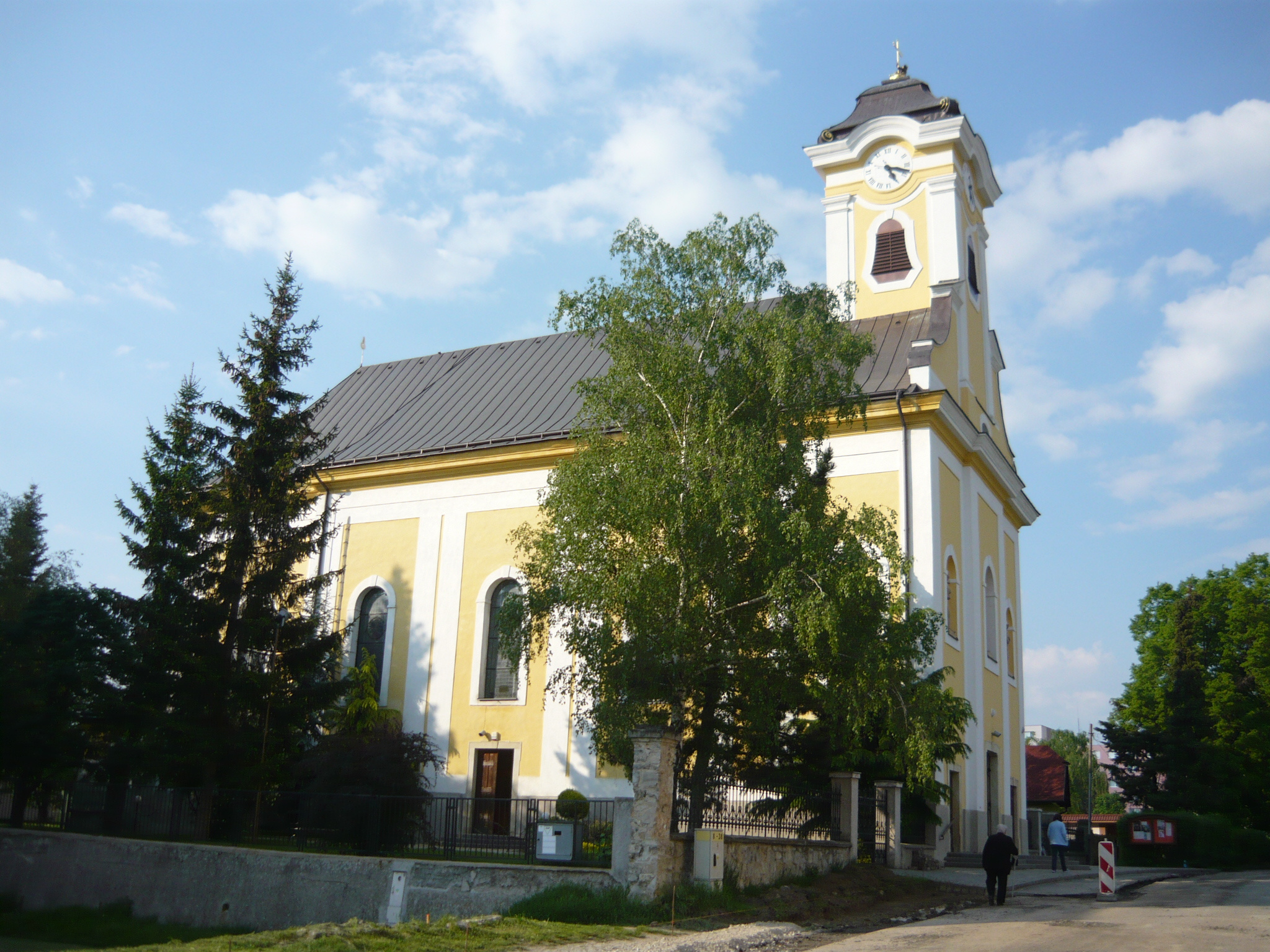
- Church of Saint Martin

- Flag Coat of arms

- Location of Bošany in the Trenčín Region Location of Bošany in Slovakia
- Coordinates: 48.58°N 18.28°E
- Country: Slovakia
- Region: Trenčín Region
- District: Partizánske District
- First mentioned: 1183

Area
  - Total: 14.46 km^{2} (5.58 sq mi)
- Elevation: 177 m (581 ft)

Population (2025)
  - Total: 3,960
- Time zone: UTC+1 (CET)
  - Summer (DST): UTC+2 (CEST)
- Postal code: 956 18
- Area code: +421 38
- Vehicle registration plate (until 2022): PE
- Website: www.bosany.sk

Bošany (Hungarian: Bossány) is a village and municipality in Partizánske District in the Trenčín Region of western Slovakia.

== History ==
The village was established in 1924 by merging the former villages of Veľké Bošany (Hungarian: Nagybossány) and Malé Bošany (Hungarian: Kisbossány). In 1960, the former village of Baštín Hungarian: Bacskafalva) was also merged into Bošany.

== Geography ==
The municipality lies at an altitude of 177 metres (581 ft) and covers an area of 14.46 km^{2} (5.58 sq mi) (2025).

== Population ==
Population statistic (10 years)
Year	1995	2005	2015	2025
Count	4250	4284	4090	3960
Difference		+0.8%	−4.52%	−3.17%

Population statistic
Year	2024	2025
Count	3989	3960
Difference		−0.72%

It has a population of 3960 people (31 December 2025).

=== Ethnicity ===
Census 2021 (1+ %)
Ethnicity	Number	Fraction
Slovak	3916	96.38%
Not found out	135	3.32%
Total	4063	

In year 2021 was 4063 people by ethnicity 3916 as Slovak, 135 as Not found out, 18 as Czech, 13 as Hungarian, 7 as Romanian, 6 as Other, 5 as Polish, 3 as German, 3 as Greek, 3 as English, 2 as Rusyn, 2 as Russian, 2 as Moravian, 1 as Italian, 1 as Serbian, 1 as Romani and 1 as Albanian.

Note on population: The difference values of population numbers in the table "Population statistic" and in the sections "Ethnicity" & "Religion" is caused by the use of various statistical methods.

=== Religion ===
Census 2021 (1+ %)
Religion	Number	Fraction
Roman Catholic Church	3089	76.03%
None	654	16.1%
Not found out	159	3.91%
Evangelical Church	60	1.48%
Total	4063	

In year 2021 was 4063 people by religion 3089 from Roman Catholic Church, 654 from None, 159 from Not found out, 60 from Evangelical Church, 27 from Greek Catholic Church, 13 from Ad hoc movements, 10 from Christian Congregations in Slovakia, 10 from Other, 7 from Eastern Orthodox Church, 7 from Paganism and natural spirituality, 7 from Other and not ascertained christian church, 5 from Buddhism, 4 from Old Catholic Church, 3 from Calvinist Church, 3 from Apostolic Church, 2 from Islam, 1 from Jewish community, 1 from Jehovah's Witnesses and 1 from Hinduism.

== Famous people ==
- Ján Chryzostom Korec, Slovak Cardinal of the Roman Catholic Church

== Genealogical resources ==
The records for genealogical research are available at the state archive "Statny Archiv in Nitra, Slovakia"

- Roman Catholic church records (births/marriages/deaths): 1691-1899 (parish A)

== See also ==
- List of municipalities and towns in Slovakia
