= FK Daugava =

FK Daugava or Daugava Riga may refer to:

== Football ==
- FC Daugava Riga (1944–1990)
- FK Pārdaugava (1991–1995)
- Torpedo Rīga (1996–2000)
- Policijas FK (1999–2002)
- FK RFS (2008–2011, also FSK Daugava-90 and FK Daugava)
- FK Daugava (2003) (2012–2015 as FK Daugava Rīga)
- FC Daugava Daugavpils (2006–2015)

== Basketball ==
- TTT Riga, known as Daugava Riga internationally
