= Krásné (Žďár nad Sázavou District) =

- Municipality
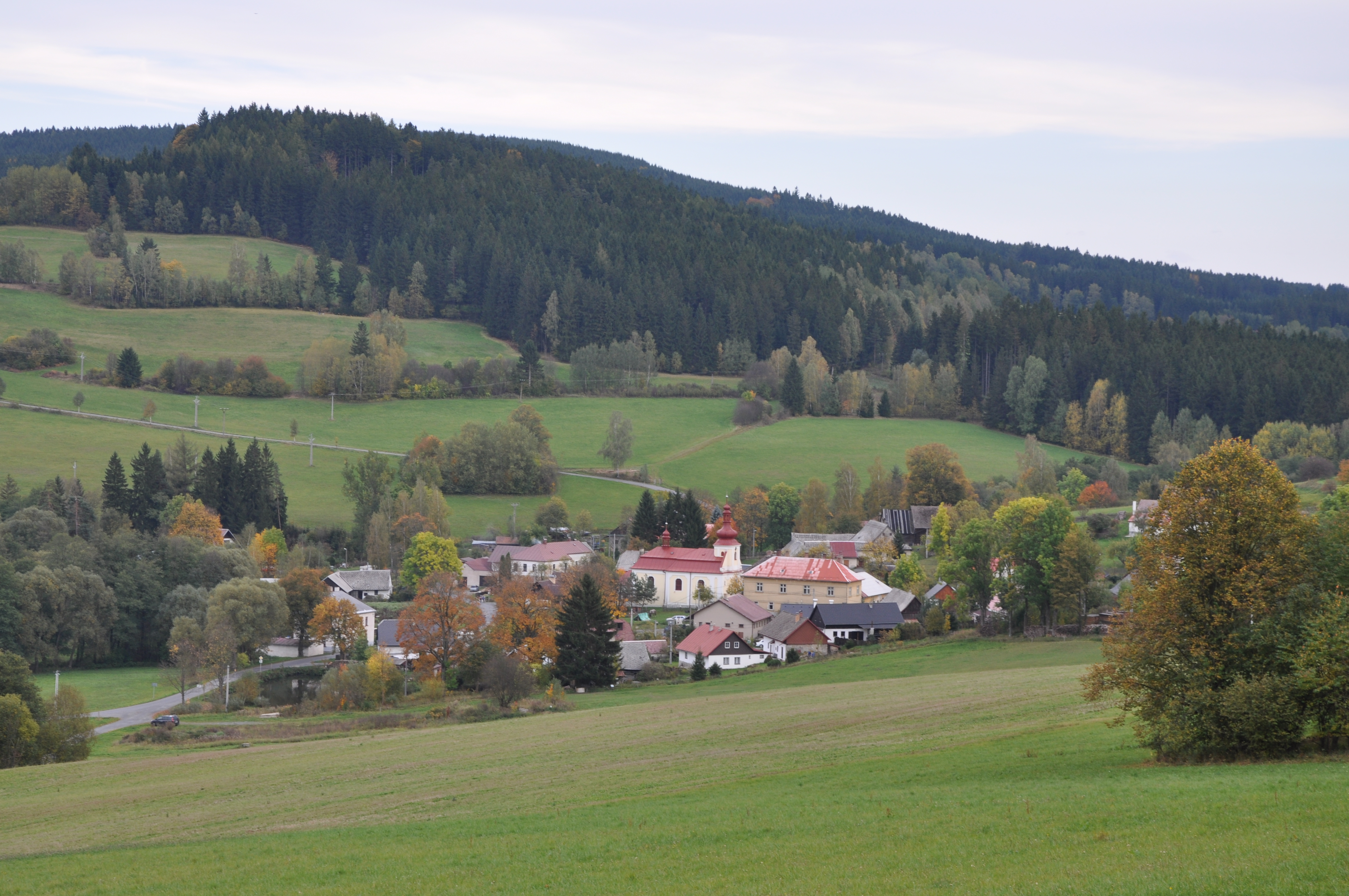
- View from the northwest

- Flag Coat of arms

- Location in the Czech Republic
- Coordinates: 49°40′40″N 16°8′42″E
- Country: Czech Republic
- Region: Vysočina
- District: Žďár nad Sázavou
- First mentioned: 1390

Area
  - Total: 8.52 km^{2} (3.29 sq mi)
- Elevation: 562 m (1,844 ft)

Population (2026-01-01)
  - Total: 119
  - Density: 14.0/km^{2} (36.2/sq mi)
- Time zone: UTC+1 (CET)
  - Summer (DST): UTC+2 (CEST)
- Postal code: 592 03
- Website: www.obec-krasne.cz

Krásné is a municipality and village in Žďár nad Sázavou District in the Vysočina Region of the Czech Republic. It has about 100 inhabitants.

Krásné lies approximately 19 kilometres (12 mi) north-east of Žďár nad Sázavou, 50 km (31 mi) north-east of Jihlava, and 131 km (81 mi) east of Prague.

== Administrative division ==
Krásné consists of two municipal parts (in brackets population according to the 2021 census):

- Krásné (87)
- Mrhov (14)

== Demographics ==
Historical population
Year	Pop.	±%
1869	409	—
1880	401	−2.0%
1890	363	−9.5%
1900	378	+4.1%
1910	368	−2.6%
1921	361	−1.9%
1930	318	−11.9%
1950	205	−35.5%
1961	192	−6.3%
1970	163	−15.1%
1980	127	−22.1%
1991	107	−15.7%
2001	103	−3.7%
2011	104	+1.0%
2021	101	−2.9%
Source: Censuses
