= Krásno, Partizánske District =

Krásno
- Municipality
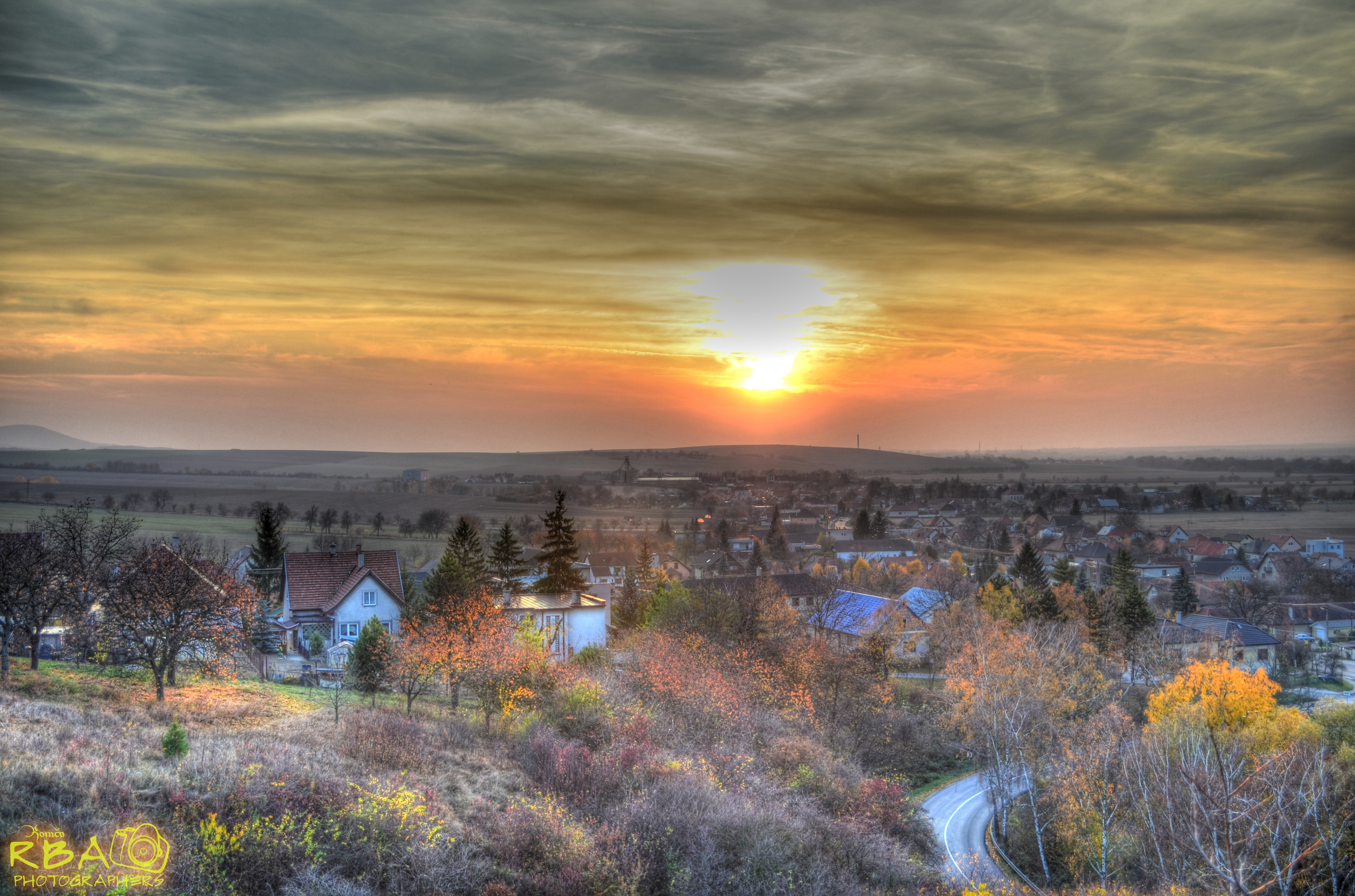

- Flag

- Location of Krásno in the Trenčín Region Location of Krásno in Slovakia
- Coordinates: 48°35′50″N 18°18′30″E
- Country: Slovakia
- Region: Trenčín Region
- District: Partizánske District
- First mentioned: 1078

Area
  - Total: 3.60 km^{2} (1.39 sq mi)
- Elevation: 189 m (620 ft)

Population (2025)
  - Total: 506
- Time zone: UTC+1 (CET)
  - Summer (DST): UTC+2 (CEST)
- Postal code: 958 43
- Area code: +421 38
- Vehicle registration plate (until 2022): PE
- Website: www.obeckrasno.sk

Krásno (Hungarian: Ószéplak) is a village and municipality in Partizánske District in the Trenčín Region of western Slovakia.

== History ==
In historical records the village was first mentioned in 1078.

== Geography ==
The municipality lies at an altitude of 189 metres (620 ft) and covers an area of 3.60 km^{2} (1.39 sq mi) (2025).

== Population ==
Population statistic (10 years)
Year	1995	2005	2015	2025
Count	558	496	503	506
Difference		−11.11%	+1.41%	+0.59%

Population statistic
Year	2024	2025
Count	518	506
Difference		−2.31%

It has a population of 506 people (31 December 2025).

=== Ethnicity ===
Census 2021 (1+ %)
Ethnicity	Number	Fraction
Slovak	501	95.24%
Not found out	19	3.61%
Total	526	

In year 2021 was 526 people by ethnicity 501 as Slovak, 19 as Not found out, 5 as Hungarian, 3 as Czech, 3 as Romani, 2 as Other, 1 as Russian, 1 as German and 1 as Canadian.

Note on population: The difference values of population numbers in the table "Population statistic" and in the sections "Ethnicity" & "Religion" is caused by the use of various statistical methods.

=== Religion ===
Census 2021 (1+ %)
Religion	Number	Fraction
Roman Catholic Church	434	82.51%
None	50	9.51%
Not found out	21	3.99%
Evangelical Church	7	1.33%
Total	526	

In year 2021 was 526 people by religion 434 from Roman Catholic Church, 50 from None, 21 from Not found out, 7 from Evangelical Church, 4 from Other and not ascertained christian church, 4 from Other, 2 from Christian Congregations in Slovakia, 2 from United Methodist Church, 1 from Greek Catholic Church and 1 from Ad hoc movements.
