= René (disambiguation) =

René is a given name and a surname.

René may also refer to:

- René (novella), an 1802 novella by François-René de Chateaubriand
- René (novel), a 1783 novel by Jozef Ignác Bajza
- René 41, a nickel based superalloy
- René, Sarthe, a French commune
- "René" (song), a 2020 song by Residente

== See also ==
- Saint-René (disambiguation)
