= List of burials at St. Martin's Cathedral, Bratislava =

This is a partial list of people buried at St. Martin's Cathedral in Bratislava, Slovakia. St. Martin's Cathedral is known especially for previously being the coronation church of the Kingdom of Hungary and since it was built over an old cemetery, it contains catacombs of unknown length and several crypts containing the sepulchres of many significant historical figures, up to six meters beneath the church.

Over the centuries, the cathedral's sepulchres filled with many significant figures, such as ecclesiastic dignitaries, presidents of the historic Pozsony county as well as J. I. Bajza, the author of the first Slovak novel, but also with dozens of bishops, canons, French priests fleeing the French Revolution and many people outside the Catholic church.

== List of people buried at St. Martin's Cathedral ==
This is a partial list of graves at St. Martin's Cathedral:

| Image | Name | Function | Year | Location |
|---|---|---|---|---|
| | Sophia of Bavaria | Queen consort of Germany, Queen consort of Bohemia | Died 1428 | Queen's Chapel |
| | Saint John the Merciful | Patriarch of Alexandria, christian saint | Taken here by Queen Mary sometime after 1526. He died between 616 and 620 in Cyprus | St. John the Merciful Chapel |
| | István Fejérkövy | archbishop | Died 1596 | Location unknown, found in the 1960s |
| | Péter Pázmány | archbishop, Primas of Hungary, cardinal | Died on March 19, 1637, in Bratislava | Found during reconstruction on September 12, 1859, rediscovered in 2010. Located in a closed grave shaft underneath the main neogothic altar in the depth of approximately 2 meters |
| | György Lippay | archbishop, Primas of Hungary | Died 1666 | Found during reconstruction on September 12, 1859, rediscovered in 2010. Located in a closed grave shaft underneath the main neogothic altar in the depth of approximately 2 meters |
| | György Széchényi | archbishop, Primas of Hungary | Died 1695 | Location unknown, found during reconstruction on September 12, 1859 |
| | Christian August of Saxe-Zeitz | archbishop, Primas of Hungary, cardinal | Died 1721 | Location unknown, found in the 1960s |
| | Dániel/Daniel Krman | Lutheran bishop, baroque author and publisher | Died on 23. September 23, 1740 in Bratislava | Unknown location |
| | Imre Esterházy | archbishop, Primas of Hungary | Died 1745 | In a separate crypt underneath the St. John the Merciful Chapel together with Csáky, Barkóczy and Batthyány. |
| | János Pálffy | Imperial Field marshal, Palatine of Hungary | Died on March 24, 1751 | Unknown location |
| | Miklós Csáky | archbishop, Primas of Hungary | Died 1757 | In a separate crypt underneath the St. John the Merciful Chapel together with Esterházy. |
| | Ferenc Barkóczy | archbishop, Primas of Hungary | Died on June 18, 1765 | In a separate crypt underneath the St. John the Merciful Chapel together with Esterházy. |
| | József Batthyány | cardinal, Primas of Hungary | Died on October 23, 1799 | In a separate crypt underneath the St. John the Merciful Chapel together with Esterházy. |
| | Jozef Ignác Bajza | Bratislava canon | Died 1836 | Unknown location |
| | József Károly Dankó | prior | Died 1895 | In Archbishop crypt |
| | Gejza Navrátil | canon | Died 1984 | In Archbishop crypt |
| | Jozef Beitl | parish administrator | Died 1991 | In Archbishop crypt |
| | Michal Buzalka | bishop | Since February 12, 2003. He died on December 7, 1961 | Temporary storage in Archbishop crypt. In 2000 his beatification process began and his body was moved to St. Martin's Cathedral. His remains are on public display. |

There is also the grave of Schomberg George - the Vice-Chancellor of Academia Istropolitana, Mikuláš II. Pálfi (Palffy) who died in 1606 in Červený Kameň, Pavol IV. Pálfi (Palffy) who died on November 26, 1653 (except his heart), a Palatine of Hungary, Ján III. Anton Pálfi (Palffy) who died in 1694 in Bratislava (except his heart), Štefan II. Pálfi (Palffy) who died on May 29, 1646, buried together with his mother and his brother Ján II. Pálfi (Palffy).

== St. Martin's Cathedral picture gallery ==
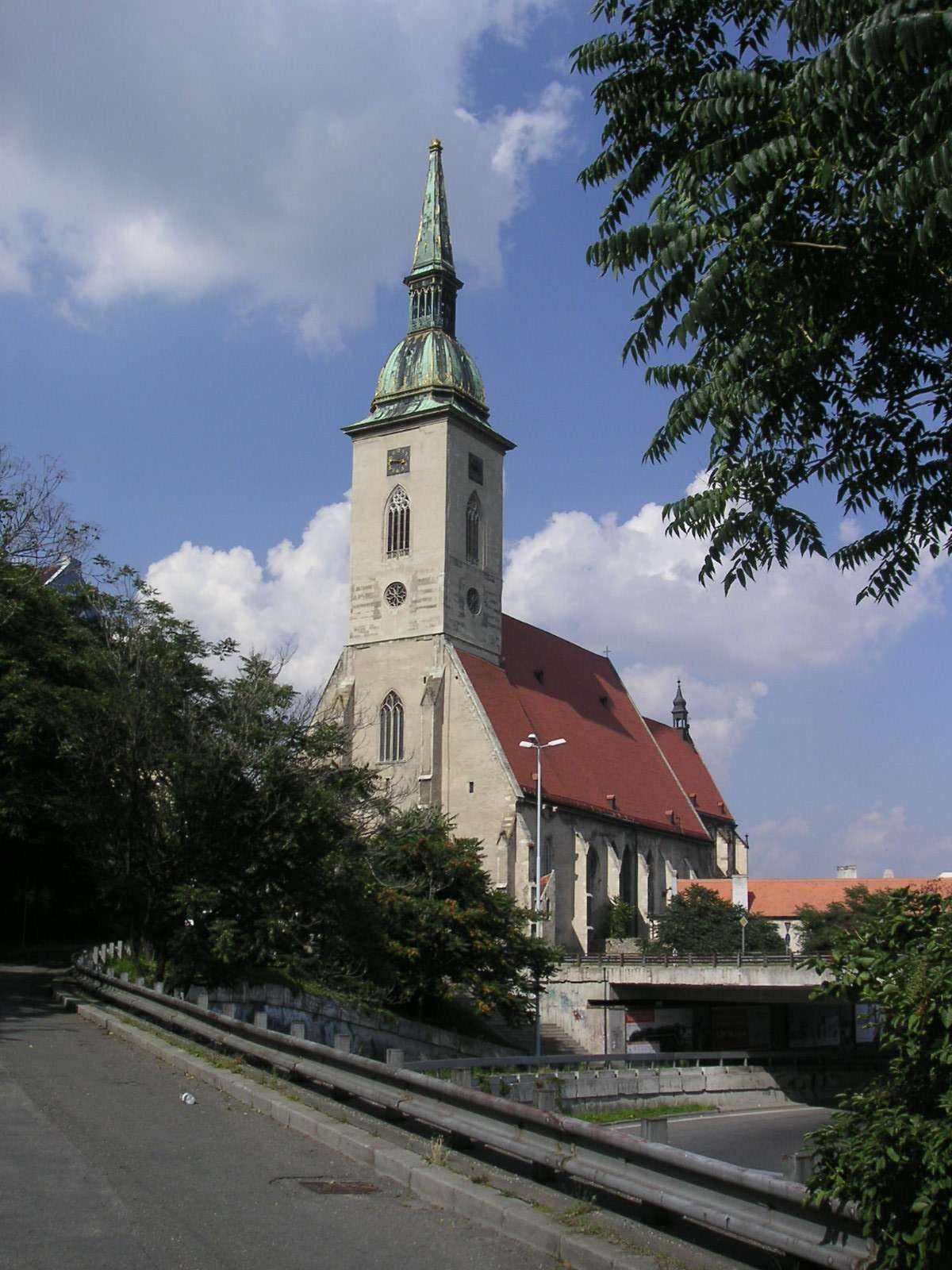
Front view of the cathedral

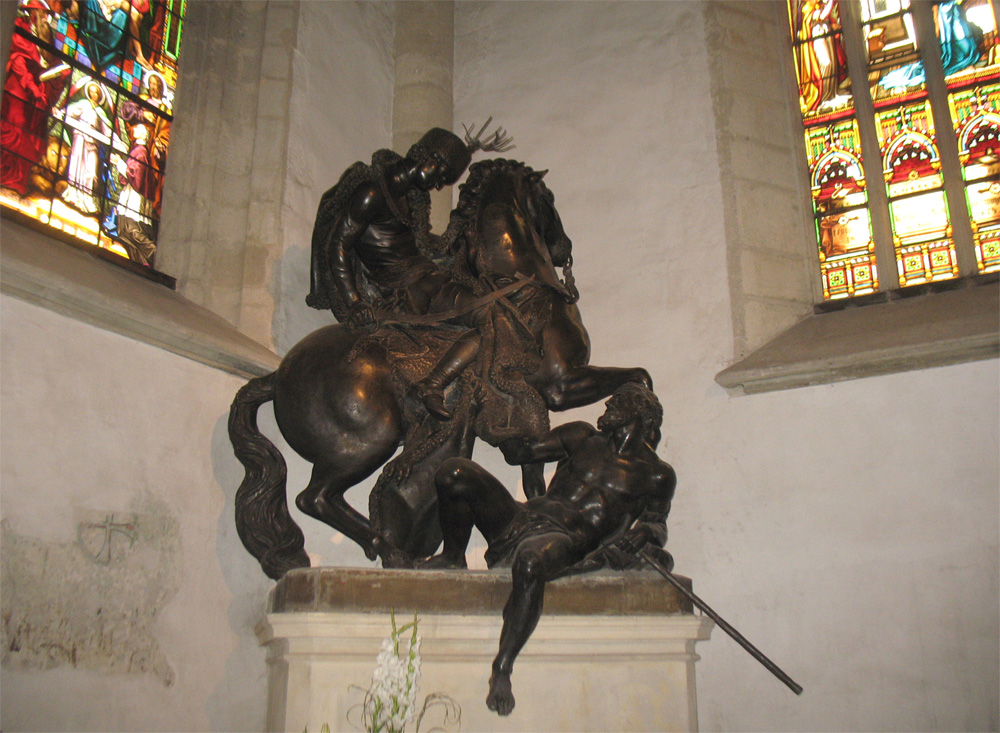
Statue of Saint Martin

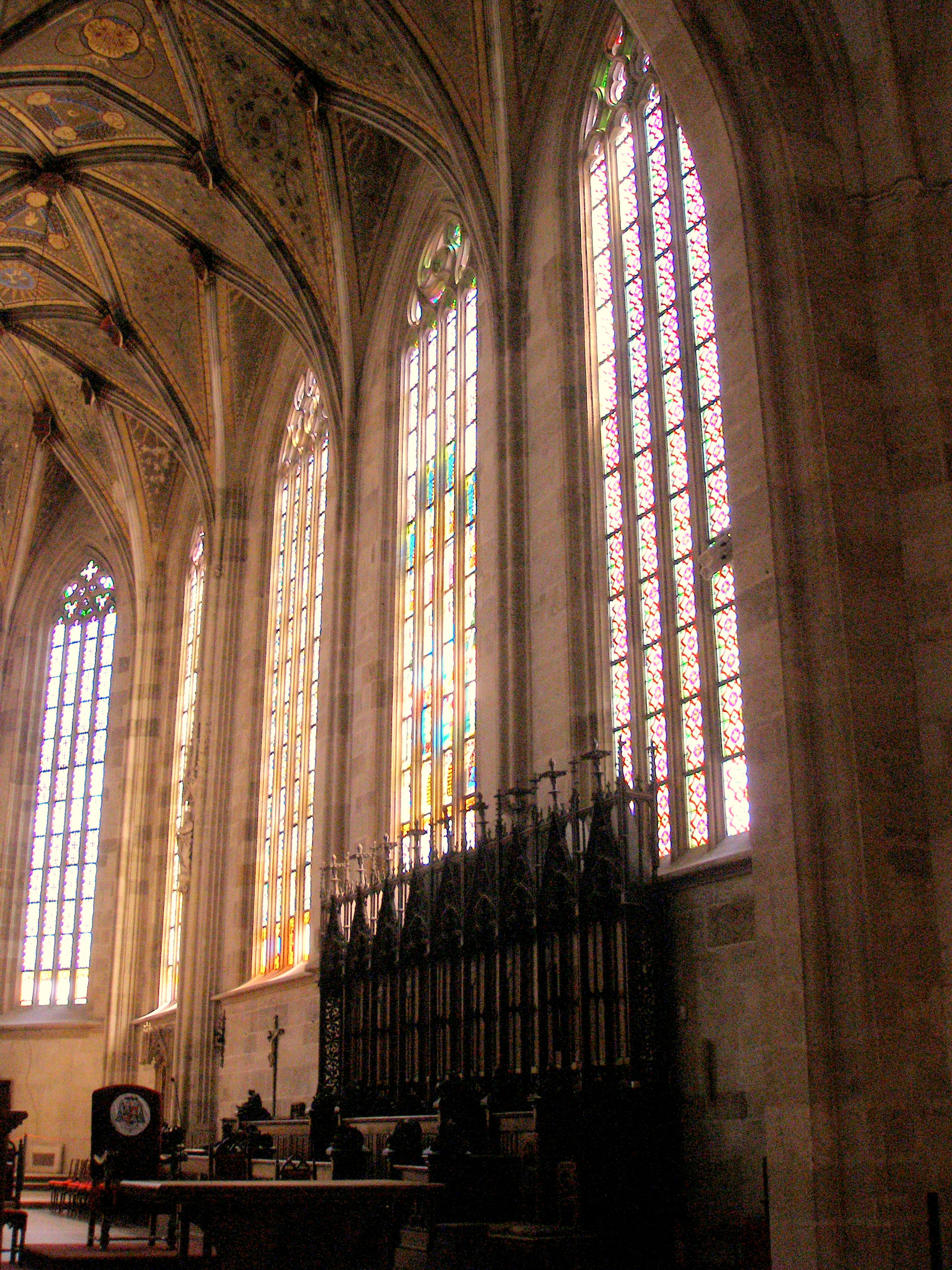
Interior of the cathedral

== See also ==
- List of cathedrals in Slovakia
- History of Bratislava
