= Jablonové, Bytča District =

Village and municipality in Slovakia

Jablonové
- Municipality
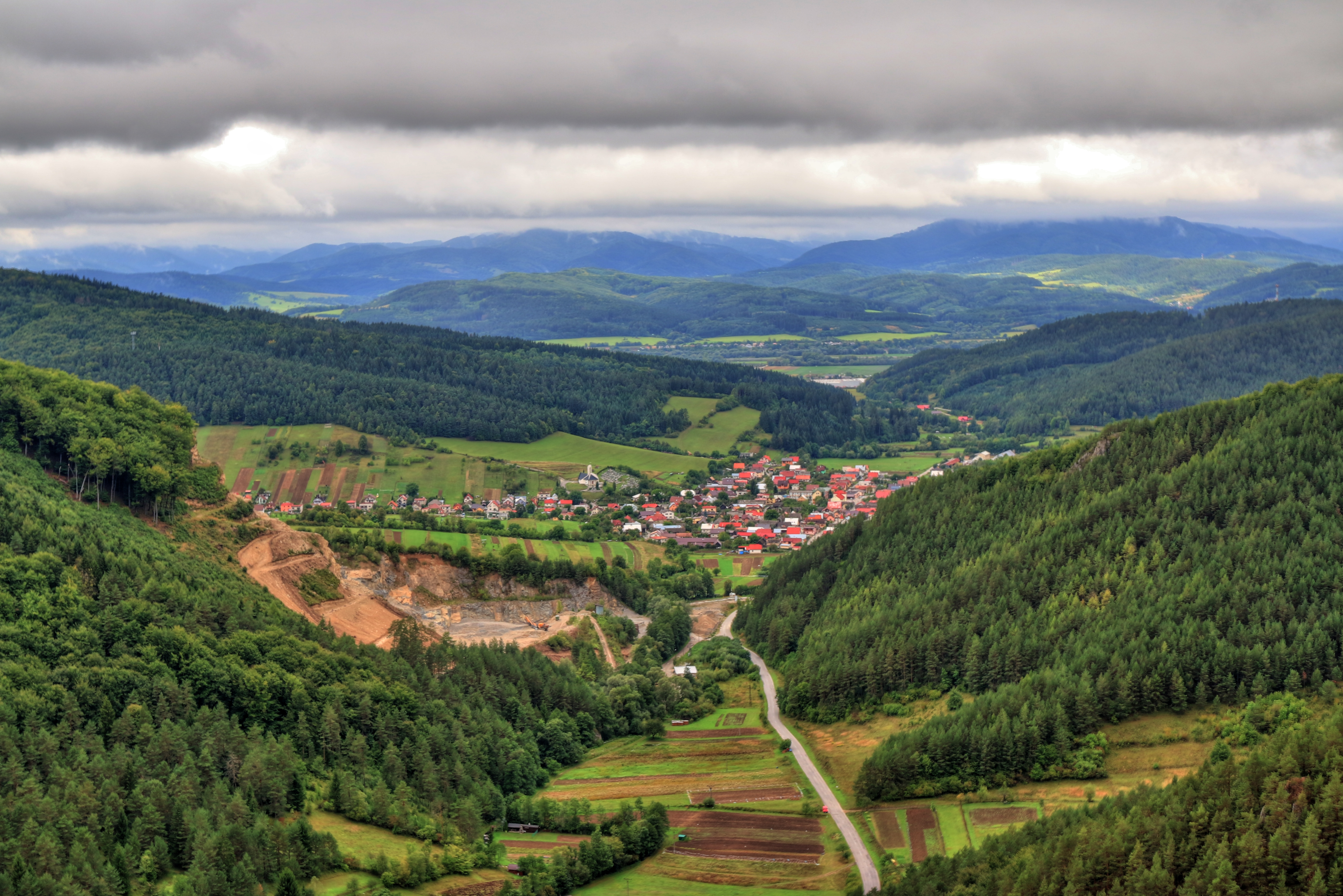

- Flag

- Location of Jablonové in the Žilina Region Location of Jablonové in Slovakia
- Coordinates: 49°11′0″N 18°34′0″E
- Country: Slovakia
- Region: Žilina Region
- District: Bytča District
- First mentioned: 1268

Area
  - Total: 4.22 km^{2} (1.63 sq mi)
- Elevation: 332 m (1,089 ft)

Population (2025)
  - Total: 885
- Time zone: UTC+1 (CET)
  - Summer (DST): UTC+2 (CEST)
- Postal code: 135 2
- Area code: +421 41
- Vehicle registration plate (until 2022): BY
- Website: www.jablonove.sk

Jablonové (Hungarian: Almásfalu) is a village and municipality in Bytča District in the Žilina Region of northern Slovakia.

== History ==
In historical records the village was first mentioned in 1268.

== Geography ==
The municipality lies at an altitude of 332 metres (1,089 ft) and covers an area of 4.22 km^{2} (1.63 sq mi) (2025).

== Population ==
Population statistic (10 years)
Year	1995	2005	2015	2025
Count	817	867	878	885
Difference		+6.11%	+1.26%	+0.79%

Population statistic
Year	2024	2025
Count	895	885
Difference		−1.11%

It has a population of 885 people (31 December 2025).

=== Ethnicity ===
Census 2021 (1+ %)
Ethnicity	Number	Fraction
Slovak	897	98.57%
Not found out	18	1.97%
Total	910	

In year 2021 was 910 people by ethnicity 897 as Slovak, 18 as Not found out, 2 as Czech, 1 as German, 1 as Hungarian, 1 as Canadian and 1 as Other.

Note on population: The difference values of population numbers in the table "Population statistic" and in the sections "Ethnicity" & "Religion" is caused by the use of various statistical methods.

=== Religion ===
Census 2021 (1+ %)
Religion	Number	Fraction
Roman Catholic Church	834	91.65%
None	44	4.84%
Not found out	12	1.32%
Total	910	

In year 2021 was 910 people by religion 834 from Roman Catholic Church, 44 from None, 12 from Not found out, 5 from Evangelical Church, 4 from Calvinist Church, 3 from Ad hoc movements, 2 from Christian Congregations in Slovakia, 2 from Other, 2 from Greek Catholic Church, 1 from Other and not ascertained christian church and 1 from Buddhism.

== Genealogical resources ==
The records for genealogical research are available at the state archive "Statny Archiv in Bytca, Slovakia"

- Roman Catholic church records (births/marriages/deaths): 1702-1949 (parish B)
- Lutheran church records (births/marriages/deaths): 1801-1907 (parish B)

== See also ==
- List of municipalities and towns in Slovakia
