= Bytča District =

Coordinates: 49°13′23″N 18°33′31″E

- District
- Country: Slovakia
- Region (kraj): Žilina Region
- Cultural region: Upper Považie
- Seat: Bytča

Area
  - Total: 281.51 km^{2} (108.69 sq mi)

Population (2025)
  - Total: 31,511
- Time zone: UTC+1 (CET)
  - Summer (DST): UTC+2 (CEST)
- Telephone prefix: 041
- Vehicle registration plate (until 2022): BY
- Municipalities: 12

Bytča District (okres Bytča) is a district in the Žilina Region of central Slovakia. The district had been first established in 1923 and in its current borders exists from 1996. Its administrative center is its largest town Bytča. The district profits from the close distance to the regional capital Žilina.

== Population ==
Population statistic (10 years)
Year	1995	2005	2015	2025
Count	30,198	30,925	30,691	31,511
Difference		+2.40%	−0.75%	+2.67%

Population statistic
Year	2024	2025
Count	31,444	31,511
Difference		+0.21%

It has a population of 31,511 people (31 December 2025).

Historical population
Year	Pop.	±%
1970	29,708	—
1980	30,821	+3.7%
1991	30,083	−2.4%
2001	30,788	+2.3%
2011	30,609	−0.6%
2021	31,154	+1.8%
Source: Statistical Office of the Slovak Republic

=== Ethnicity ===
Census 2021 (1+ %)
Ethnicity	Number	Fraction
Slovak	29,943	94.79%
Not found out	1175	3.72%
Total	31,586	

In year 2021 was 31,586 people by ethnicity 29,943 as Slovak, 1175 as Not found out, 192 as Czech, 67 as Other, 44 as Russian, 30 as Hungarian, 27 as German, 12 as Rusyn, 12 as Polish, 10 as Vietnamese, 10 as Ukrainian, 9 as Bulgarian, 7 as Italian, 7 as Moravian, 6 as Croatian, 6 as English, 5 as Jewish, 5 as Austrian, 4 as Romani, 3 as Canadian, 3 as French, 3 as Albanian, 2 as Irish, 2 as Serbian, 1 as Romanian and 1 as Korean.

Note on population: The difference values of population numbers in the table "Population statistic" and in the sections "Ethnicity" & "Religion" is caused by the use of various statistical methods.

=== Religion ===
Census 2021 (1+ %)
Religion	Number	Fraction
Roman Catholic Church	25,229	80.98%
None	3105	9.97%
Not found out	1315	4.22%
Evangelical Church	786	2.52%
Total	31,154	

In year 2021 was 31,154 people by religion 25,229 from Roman Catholic Church, 3105 from None, 1315 from Not found out, 786 from Evangelical Church, 188 from Christian Congregations in Slovakia, 158 from Greek Catholic Church, 90 from Ad hoc movements, 82 from Other, 41 from Calvinist Church, 31 from Other and not ascertained christian church, 23 from Buddhism, 22 from Paganism and natural spirituality, 20 from Eastern Orthodox Church, 15 from Jehovah's Witnesses, 12 from United Methodist Church, 8 from Church of the Brethren, 8 from Seventh-day Adventist Church, 7 from Islam, 4 from Hinduism, 3 from Apostolic Church, 2 from Old Catholic Church, 2 from Bahá'i Community, 1 from Jewish community, 1 from Czechoslovak Hussite Church and 1 from Church of Jesus Christ of Latter-day Saints.

== Municipalities ==
Municipality	Area [km^{2}]	Population
Bytča	48.52	11,729
Hlboké nad Váhom	0.00	946
Hvozdnica	8.73	1,238
Jablonové	4.22	885
Kolárovice	27.56	1,775
Kotešová	20.33	2,368
Maršová-Rašov	9.57	1,057
Petrovice	32.53	1,669
Predmier	10.87	1,360
Súľov-Hradná	22.95	1,006
Štiavnik	55.69	3,928
Veľké Rovné	40.60	3,550

Population and area values are current for year 2025.
