= Hlboké nad Váhom =

Village and municipality in Slovakia

- Municipality
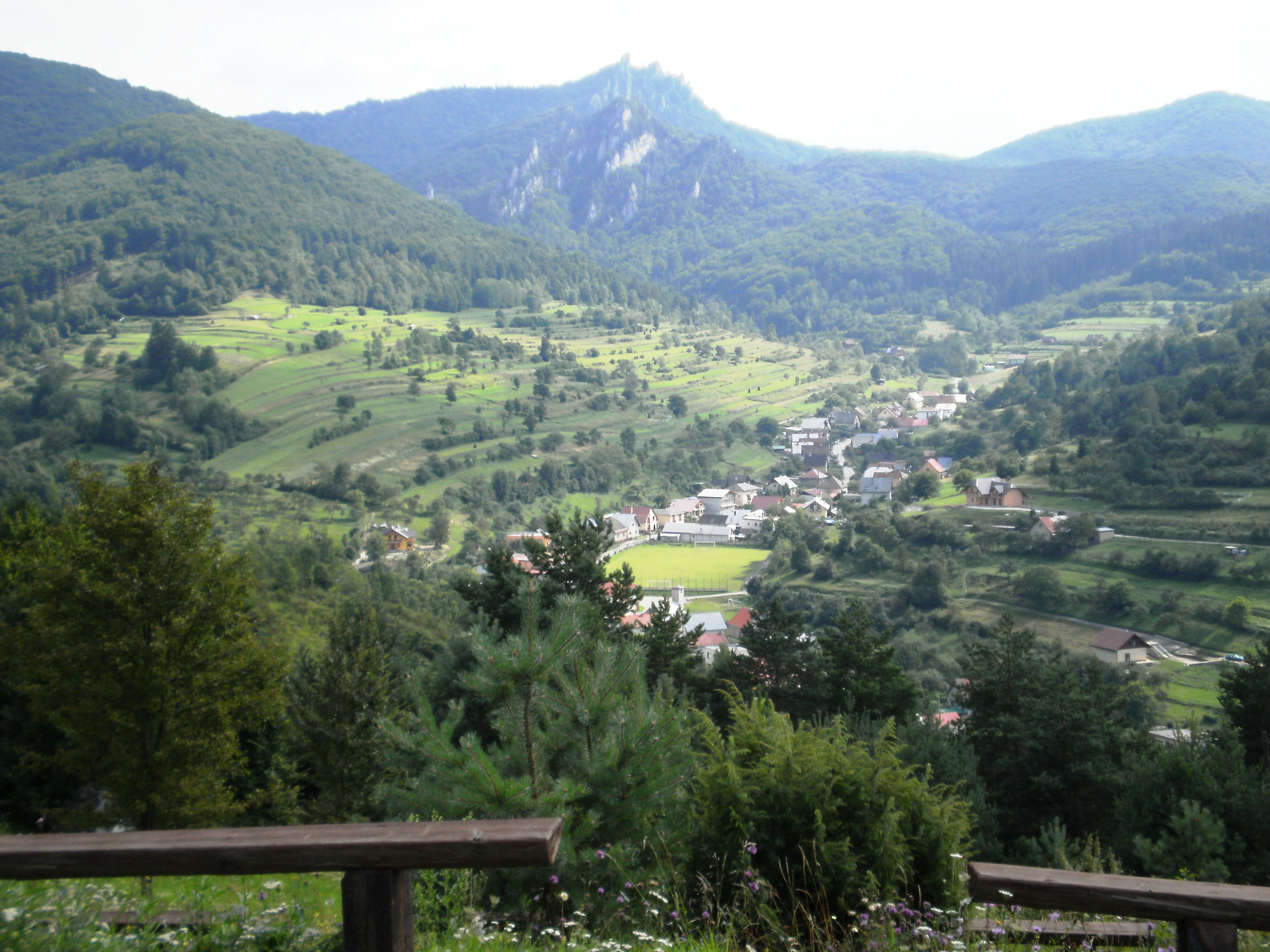

- Flag

- Location of Hlboké nad Váhom in the Žilina Region Location of Hlboké nad Váhom in Slovakia
- Coordinates: 49.21°N 18.59°E
- Country: Slovakia
- Region: Žilina Region
- District: Bytča District
- First mentioned: 1347

Area
  - Total: 0.00 km^{2} (0 sq mi)
- Elevation: 341 m (1,119 ft)

Population (2025)
  - Total: 946
- Time zone: UTC+1 (CET)
  - Summer (DST): UTC+2 (CEST)
- Postal code: 140 1
- Area code: +421 41
- Vehicle registration plate (until 2022): BY
- Website: www.hlbokenadvahom.info

Hlboké nad Váhom (Hungarian: Mélyesd) is a village and municipality in Bytča District in the Žilina Region of northern Slovakia.

== History ==
In historical records the village was first mentioned in 1347.

== Geography ==
The municipality lies at an altitude of 341 metres (1,119 ft) and covers an area of 0.00 km^{2} (0 sq mi) (2025).

== Population ==
Population statistic (10 years)
Year	1995	2005	2015	2025
Count	0	922	946	946
Difference		–	+2.60%	−1.42%

Population statistic
Year	2024	2025
Count	953	946
Difference		−0.73%

It has a population of 946 people (31 December 2025).

=== Ethnicity ===
Census 2021 (1+ %)
Ethnicity	Number	Fraction
Slovak	966	99.07%
Not found out	15	1.53%
Total	975	

In year 2021 was 975 people by ethnicity 966 as Slovak, 15 as Not found out, 7 as Czech, 2 as Russian, 2 as Hungarian and 1 as Other.

Note on population: The difference values of population numbers in the table "Population statistic" and in the sections "Ethnicity" & "Religion" is caused by the use of various statistical methods.

=== Religion ===
Census 2021 (1+ %)
Religion	Number	Fraction
Roman Catholic Church	846	86.77%
None	85	8.72%
Christian Congregations in Slovakia	11	1.13%
Total	975	

In year 2021 was 975 people by religion 846 from Roman Catholic Church, 85 from None, 11 from Christian Congregations in Slovakia, 7 from Not found out, 7 from Evangelical Church, 6 from Jehovah's Witnesses, 4 from Greek Catholic Church, 3 from Other, 2 from Ad hoc movements, 1 from Calvinist Church, 1 from Hinduism, 1 from United Methodist Church and 1 from Czechoslovak Hussite Church.

== Genealogical resources ==
The records for genealogical research are available at the state archive "Statny Archiv in Bytca, Slovakia"

== See also ==
- List of municipalities and towns in Slovakia
