= Kotešová =

- Municipality
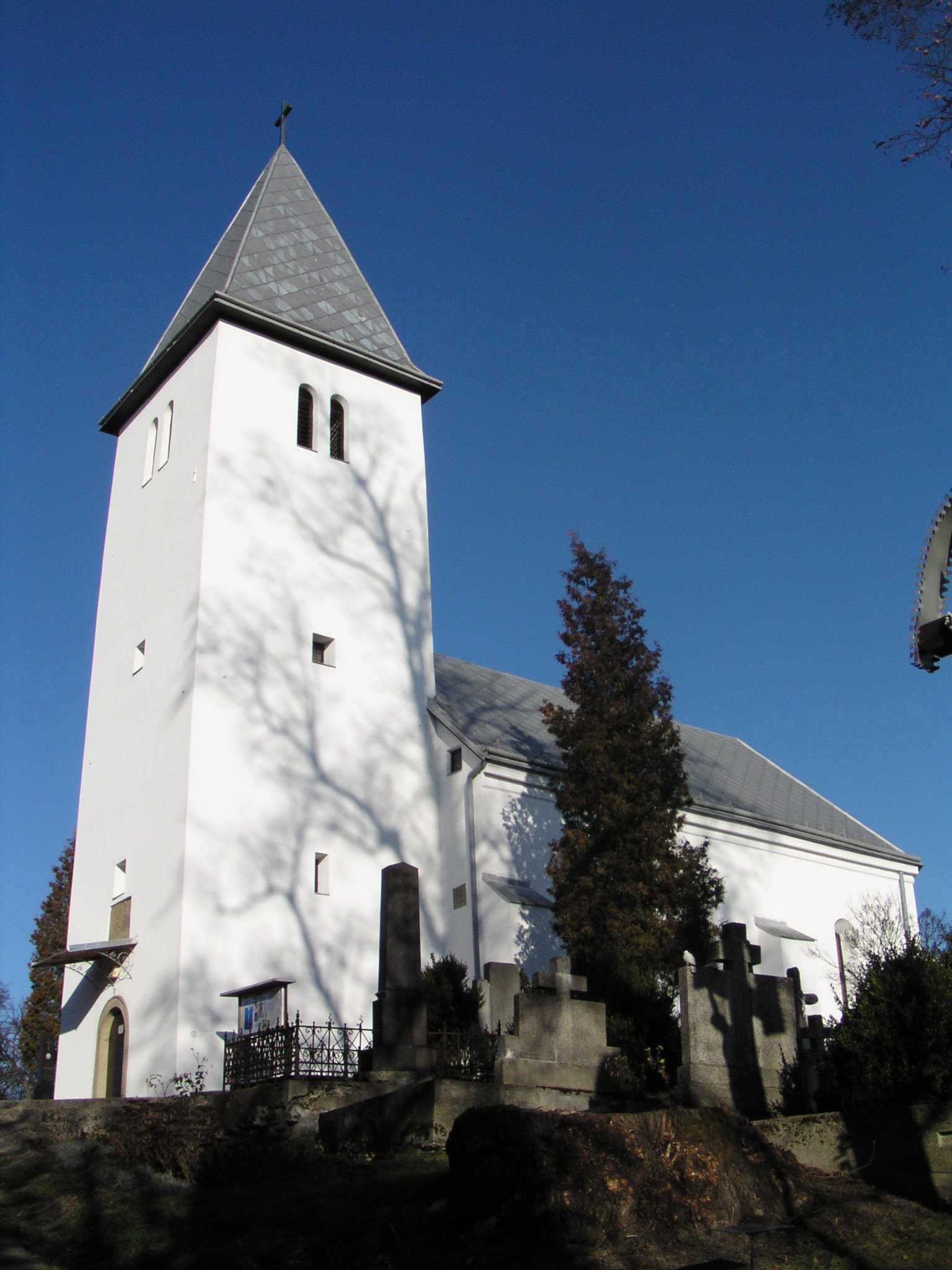

- Flag

- Location of Kotešová in the Žilina Region Location of Kotešová in Slovakia
- Coordinates: 49.23°N 18.60°E
- Country: Slovakia
- Region: Žilina Region
- District: Bytča District
- First mentioned: 1243

Area
  - Total: 20.33 km^{2} (7.85 sq mi)
- Elevation: 343 m (1,125 ft)

Population (2025)
  - Total: 2,368
- Time zone: UTC+1 (CET)
  - Summer (DST): UTC+2 (CEST)
- Postal code: 136 1
- Area code: +421 41
- Vehicle registration plate (until 2022): BY
- Website: www.kotesova.info

Kotešová (Hungarian: Kotessó) is a village and municipality in Bytča District in the Žilina Region of northern Slovakia.

== History ==
In historical records the village was first mentioned in 1243.

== Geography ==
The municipality lies at an altitude of 343 metres (1,125 ft) and covers an area of 20.33 km^{2} (7.85 sq mi) (2025).

== Population ==
Population statistic (10 years)
Year	1995	2005	2015	2025
Count	1769	1904	1985	2368
Difference		+7.63%	+4.25%	+19.29%

Population statistic
Year	2024	2025
Count	2330	2368
Difference		+1.63%

It has a population of 2368 people (31 December 2025).

=== Ethnicity ===
Census 2021 (1+ %)
Ethnicity	Number	Fraction
Slovak	2121	98.6%
Not found out	28	1.3%
Total	2151	

In year 2021 was 2151 people by ethnicity 2121 as Slovak, 28 as Not found out, 10 as Czech, 10 as Hungarian, 4 as Other, 2 as Russian, 2 as English, 1 as Polish and 1 as Bulgarian.

Note on population: The difference values of population numbers in the table "Population statistic" and in the sections "Ethnicity" & "Religion" is caused by the use of various statistical methods.

=== Religion ===
Census 2021 (1+ %)
Religion	Number	Fraction
Roman Catholic Church	1747	81.22%
None	281	13.06%
Not found out	55	2.56%
Total	2151	

In year 2021 was 2151 people by religion 1747 from Roman Catholic Church, 281 from None, 55 from Not found out, 13 from Christian Congregations in Slovakia, 10 from Greek Catholic Church, 10 from Evangelical Church, 10 from Ad hoc movements, 5 from Calvinist Church, 5 from United Methodist Church, 4 from Other and not ascertained christian church, 4 from Other, 2 from Paganism and natural spirituality, 2 from Buddhism, 2 from Apostolic Church and 1 from Jehovah's Witnesses.

== Genealogical resources ==
The records for genealogical research are available at the state archive "Statny Archiv in Bytca, Slovakia"

- Roman Catholic church records (births/marriages/deaths): 1630-1936 (parish A)
- Lutheran church records (births/marriages/deaths): 1801-1907 (parish B)

== See also ==
- List of municipalities and towns in Slovakia
