= Predmier =

- Municipality
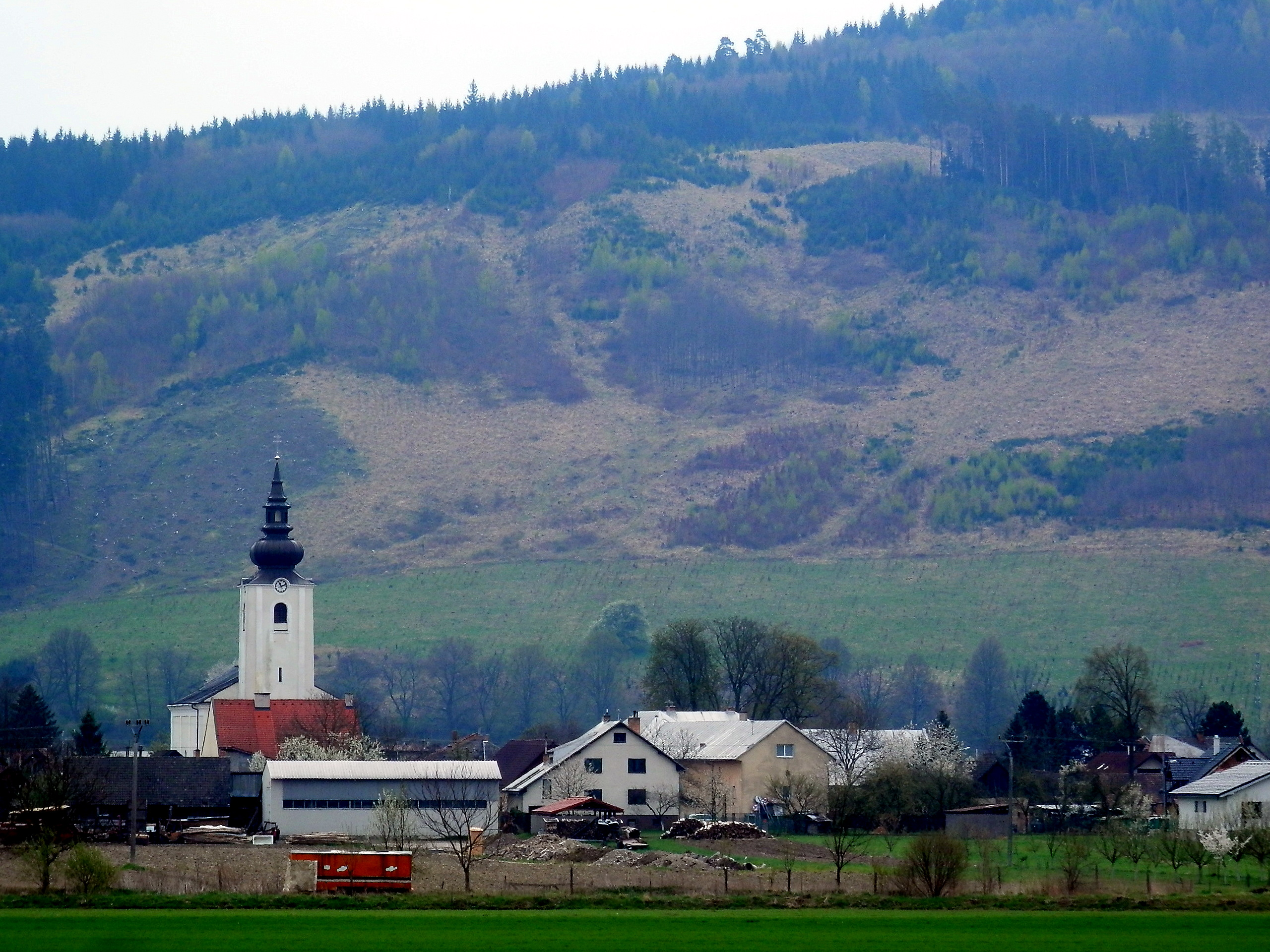

- Flag

- Location of Predmier in the Žilina Region Location of Predmier in Slovakia
- Coordinates: 49.20°N 18.53°E
- Country: Slovakia
- Region: Žilina Region
- District: Bytča District
- First mentioned: 1193

Area
  - Total: 10.87 km^{2} (4.20 sq mi)
- Elevation: 300 m (980 ft)

Population (2025)
  - Total: 1,360
- Time zone: UTC+1 (CET)
  - Summer (DST): UTC+2 (CEST)
- Postal code: 135 1
- Area code: +421 41
- Vehicle registration plate (until 2022): BY
- Website: www.predmier.sk

Predmier (Hungarian: Peredmér) is a village in the Bytča District in the Žilina Region of Slovakia. It has a population of 1,350.

== Geography ==
The municipality lies at an altitude of 300 metres (980 ft) and covers an area of 10.87 km^{2} (4.20 sq mi) (2025).

== Population ==
Population statistic (10 years)
Year	1995	2005	2015	2025
Count	1348	1357	1357	1360
Difference		+0.66%	+0%	+0.22%

Population statistic
Year	2024	2025
Count	1363	1360
Difference		−0.22%

It has a population of 1360 people (31 December 2025).

=== Ethnicity ===
Census 2021 (1+ %)
Ethnicity	Number	Fraction
Slovak	1284	94.62%
Not found out	75	5.52%
Total	1357	

In year 2021 was 1357 people by ethnicity 1284 as Slovak, 75 as Not found out, 4 as Other, 3 as Czech, 2 as Irish, 2 as Russian, 1 as Rusyn, 1 as Polish and 1 as Hungarian.

Note on population: The difference values of population numbers in the table "Population statistic" and in the sections "Ethnicity" & "Religion" is caused by the use of various statistical methods.

=== Religion ===
Census 2021 (1+ %)
Religion	Number	Fraction
Roman Catholic Church	1133	83.49%
None	120	8.84%
Not found out	69	5.08%
Total	1357	

In year 2021 was 1357 people by religion 1133 from Roman Catholic Church, 120 from None, 69 from Not found out, 13 from Greek Catholic Church, 9 from Evangelical Church, 5 from Other, 3 from Other and not ascertained christian church, 3 from Ad hoc movements, 1 from Calvinist Church and 1 from Islam.

== Notable people ==
- Jozef Ignác Bajza, author of the first novel written in Slovak
