= Petrovice, Bytča District =

Petrovice
- Municipality
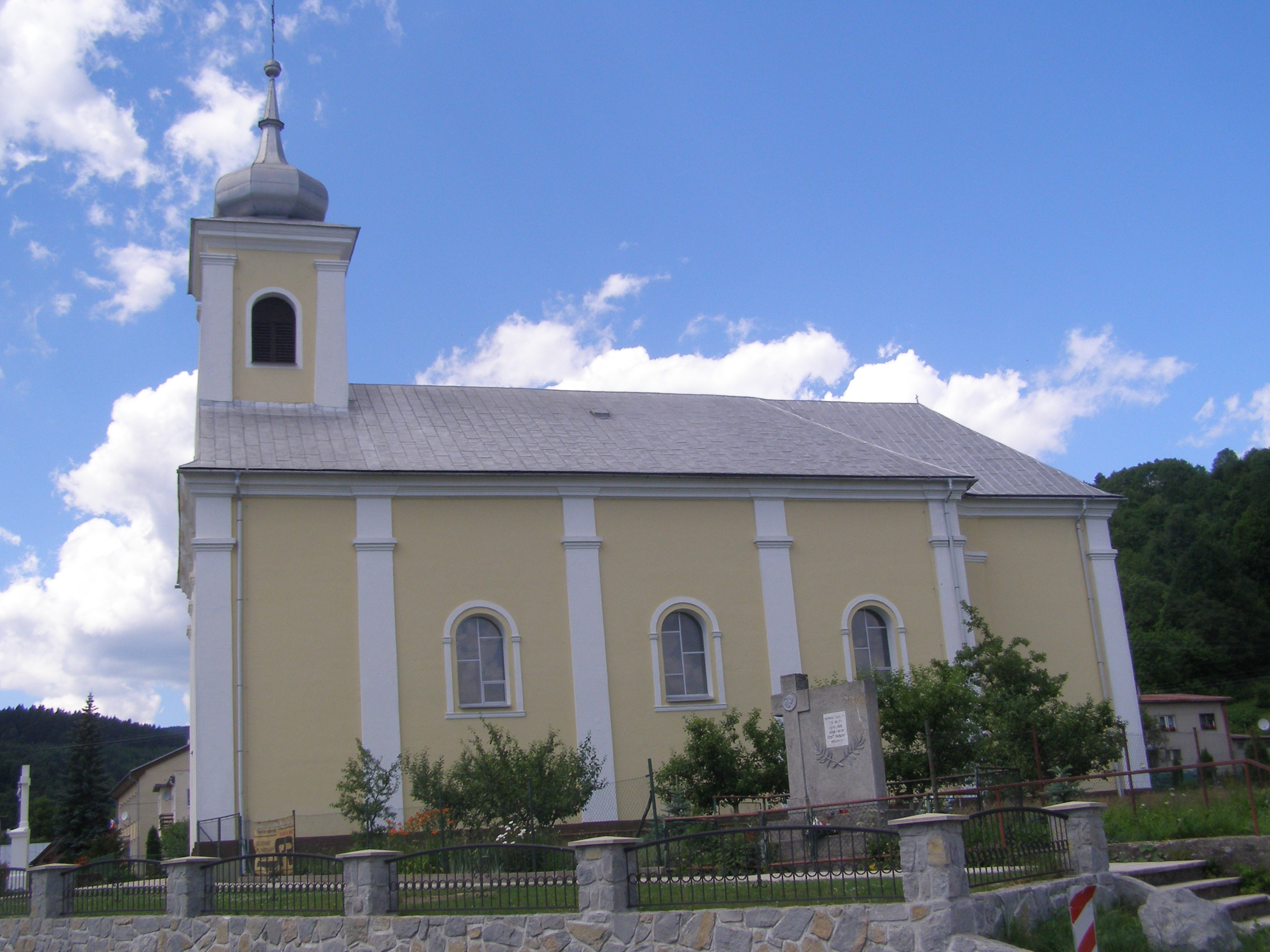

- Flag

- Location of Petrovice in the Žilina Region Location of Petrovice in Slovakia
- Coordinates: 49°16′0″N 18°32′0″E
- Country: Slovakia
- Region: Žilina Region
- District: Bytča District
- First mentioned: 1312

Area
  - Total: 32.53 km^{2} (12.56 sq mi)
- Elevation: 564 m (1,850 ft)

Population (2025)
  - Total: 1,669
- Time zone: UTC+1 (CET)
  - Summer (DST): UTC+2 (CEST)
- Postal code: 135 3
- Area code: +421 41
- Vehicle registration plate (until 2022): BY
- Website: www.obecpetrovice.sk

Petrovice (Hungarian: Trencsénpéteri) is a village and municipality in Bytča District in the Žilina Region of northern Slovakia.

== History ==
In historical records the village was first mentioned in 1312.

== Geography ==
The municipality lies at an altitude of 564 metres (1,850 ft) and covers an area of 32.53 km^{2} (12.56 sq mi) (2025).

== Population ==
Population statistic (10 years)
Year	1995	2005	2015	2025
Count	1346	1502	1569	1669
Difference		+11.58%	+4.46%	+6.37%

Population statistic
Year	2024	2025
Count	1671	1669
Difference		−0.11%

It has a population of 1669 people (31 December 2025).

=== Ethnicity ===
Census 2021 (1+ %)
Ethnicity	Number	Fraction
Slovak	1555	96.34%
Not found out	47	2.91%
Czech	18	1.11%
Total	1614	

In year 2021 was 1614 people by ethnicity 1555 as Slovak, 47 as Not found out, 18 as Czech, 7 as Other, 4 as Russian, 4 as German, 1 as Polish and 1 as Hungarian.

Note on population: The difference values of population numbers in the table "Population statistic" and in the sections "Ethnicity" & "Religion" is caused by the use of various statistical methods.

=== Religion ===
Census 2021 (1+ %)
Religion	Number	Fraction
Roman Catholic Church	1327	82.22%
None	164	10.16%
Not found out	57	3.53%
Total	1614	

In year 2021 was 1614 people by religion 1327 from Roman Catholic Church, 164 from None, 57 from Not found out, 15 from Christian Congregations in Slovakia, 12 from Greek Catholic Church, 10 from Evangelical Church, 10 from Ad hoc movements, 6 from Other, 5 from Calvinist Church, 3 from Paganism and natural spirituality, 3 from Other and not ascertained christian church, 1 from Church of Jesus Christ of Latter-day Saints and 1 from Buddhism.
