= Súľov-Hradná =

- Municipality
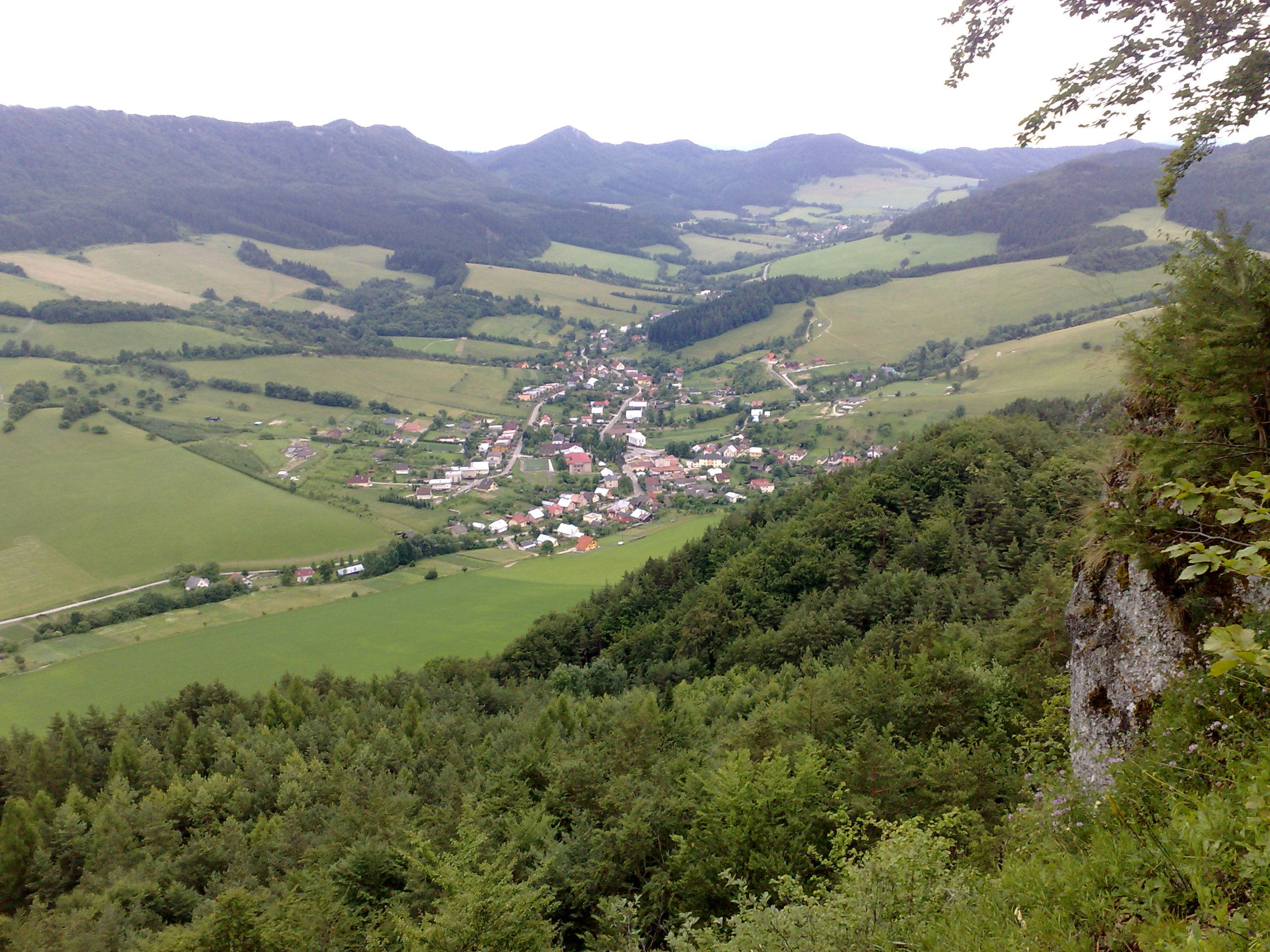

- Flag

- Location of Súľov-Hradná in the Žilina Region Location of Súľov-Hradná in Slovakia
- Coordinates: 49.17°N 18.60°E
- Country: Slovakia
- Region: Žilina Region
- District: Bytča District
- First mentioned: 1193

Area
  - Total: 22.95 km^{2} (8.86 sq mi)
- Elevation: 418 m (1,371 ft)

Population (2025)
  - Total: 1,006
- Time zone: UTC+1 (CET)
  - Summer (DST): UTC+2 (CEST)
- Postal code: 135 2
- Area code: +421 41
- Vehicle registration plate (until 2022): BY
- Website: sulov-hradna.sk

Súľov-Hradná (Hungarian: Szulyóváralja) is a village and municipality in Bytča District in the Žilina Region of northern Slovakia.

== History ==
In historical records the village was first mentioned in 1193.

== Geography ==
The municipality lies at an altitude of 418 metres (1,371 ft) and covers an area of 22.95 km^{2} (8.86 sq mi) (2025).

The village is situated within the Súľov Mountains, and the highest mountain of the picturesque Súľov Rocks, Zibrid (867 m), is part of Súľov-Hradná's territory.

== Population ==
Population statistic (10 years)
Year	1995	2005	2015	2025
Count	929	925	933	1006
Difference		−0.43%	+0.86%	+7.82%

Population statistic
Year	2024	2025
Count	1009	1006
Difference		−0.29%

It has a population of 1006 people (31 December 2025).

=== Ethnicity ===
Census 2021 (1+ %)
Ethnicity	Number	Fraction
Slovak	948	97.03%
Not found out	30	3.07%
Total	977	

In year 2021 was 977 people by ethnicity 948 as Slovak, 30 as Not found out, 3 as Czech, 1 as Russian, 1 as German, 1 as Hungarian, 1 as Other and 1 as Croatian.

Note on population: The difference values of population numbers in the table "Population statistic" and in the sections "Ethnicity" & "Religion" is caused by the use of various statistical methods.

=== Religion ===
Census 2021 (1+ %)
Religion	Number	Fraction
Evangelical Church	530	54.25%
Roman Catholic Church	282	28.86%
None	120	12.28%
Not found out	31	3.17%
Total	977	

In year 2021 was 977 people by religion 530 from Evangelical Church, 282 from Roman Catholic Church, 120 from None, 31 from Not found out, 6 from Ad hoc movements, 2 from Christian Congregations in Slovakia, 2 from Other, 2 from Greek Catholic Church, 1 from Paganism and natural spirituality and 1 from Jehovah's Witnesses.

== Gallery ==
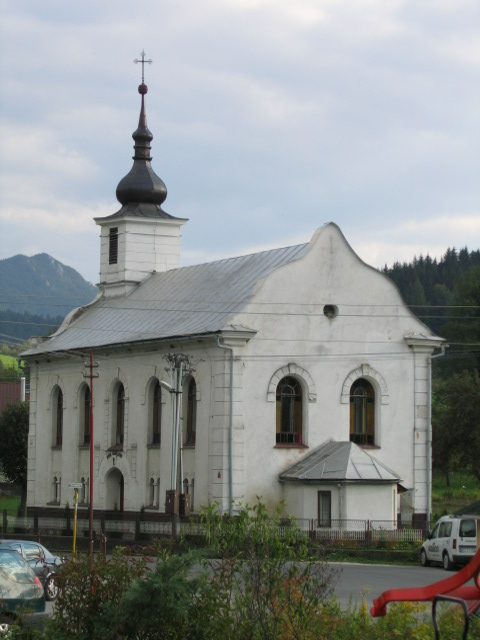
Church in Sulov

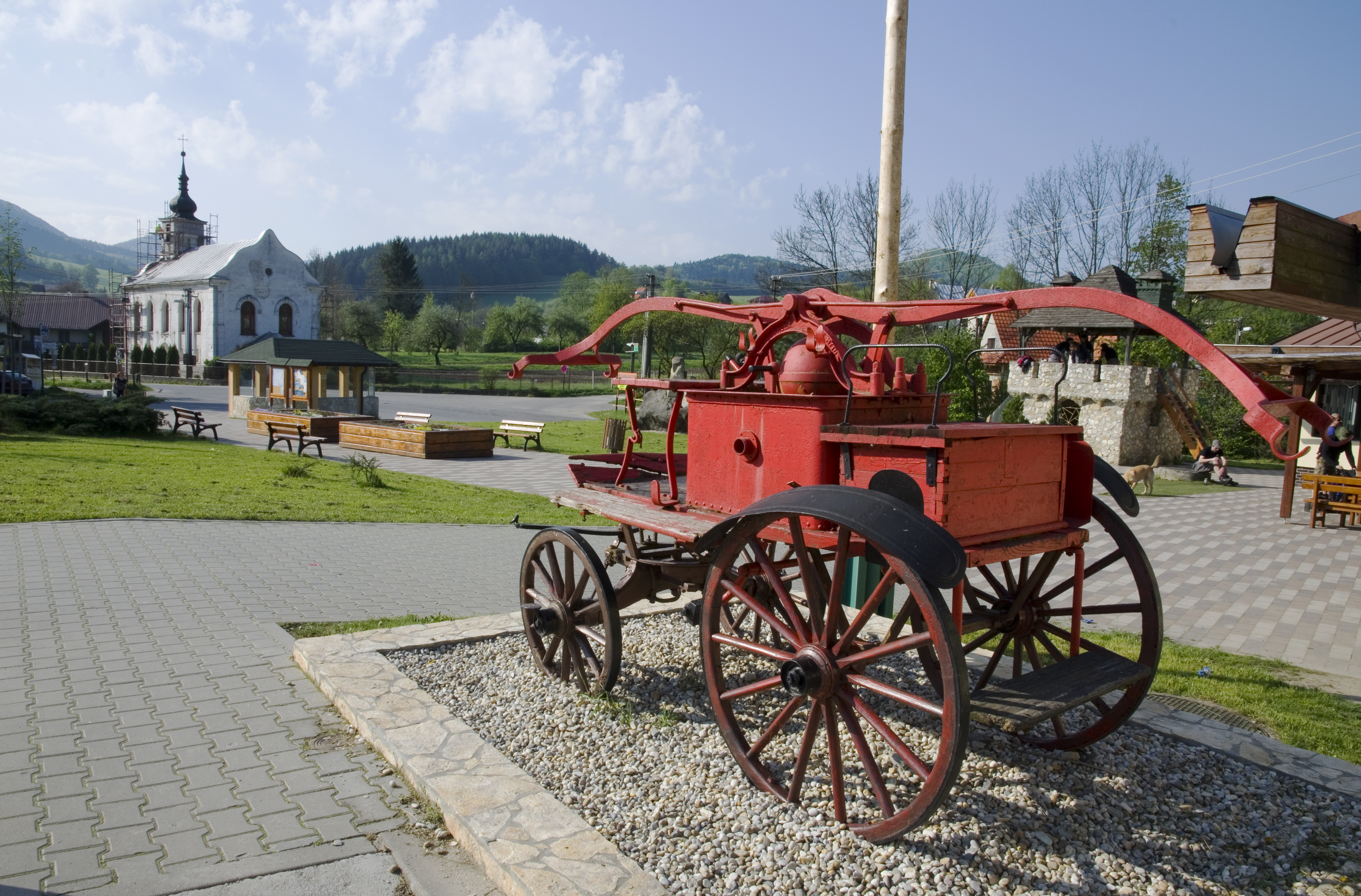
Square with a church and a historical fire truck

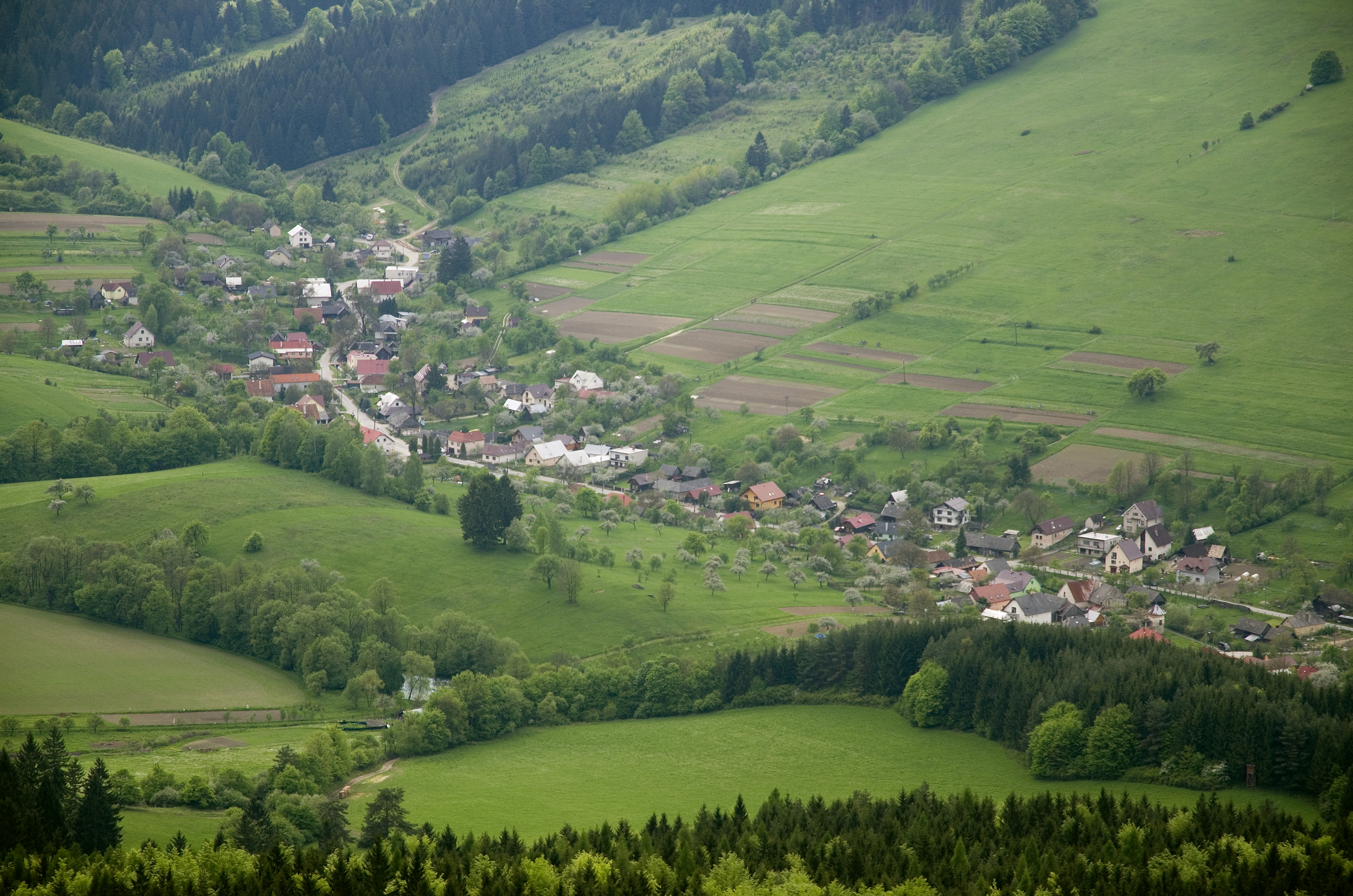
The municipality Súľov-Hradná - Hradná part

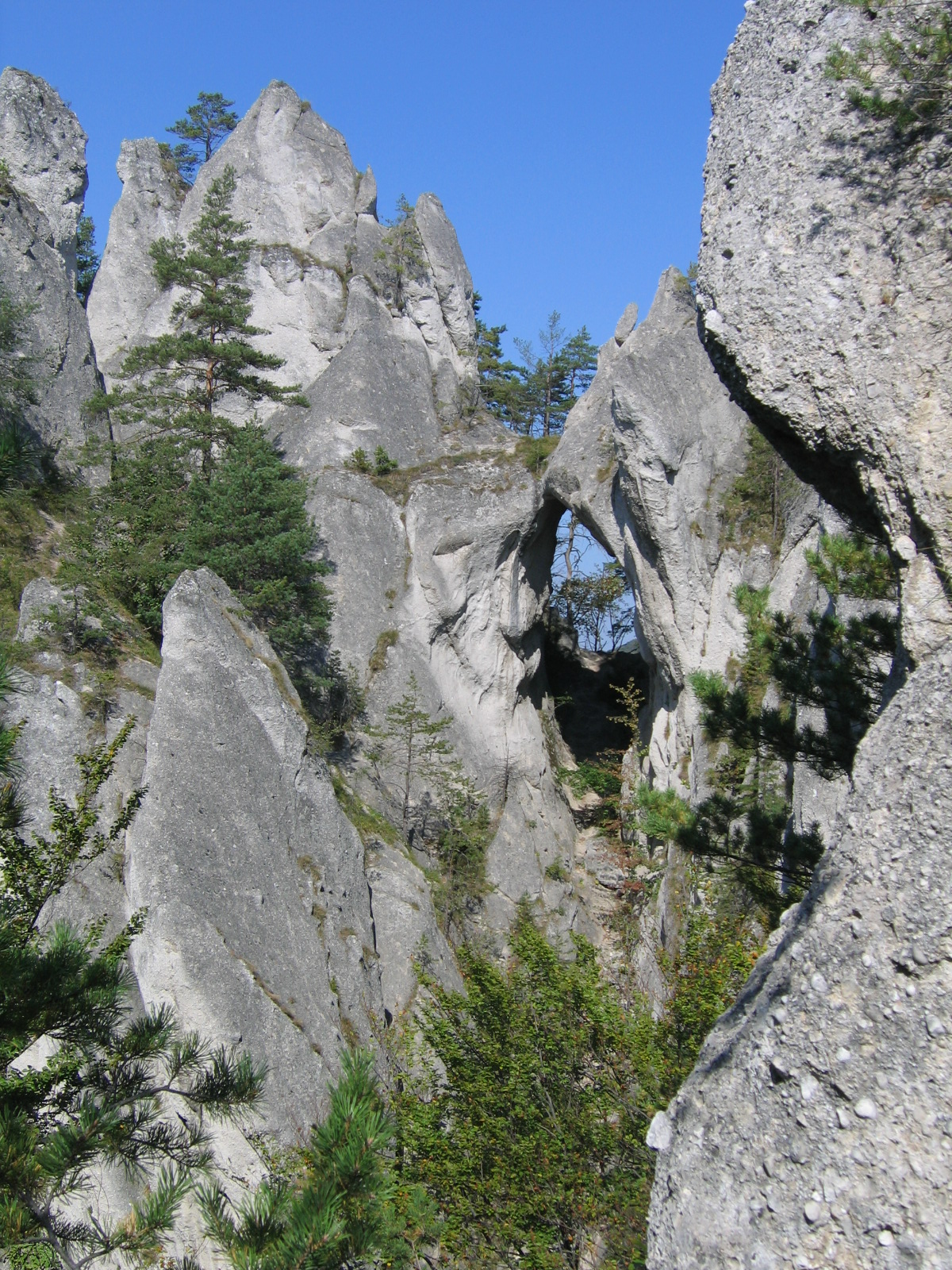
Súľov Rocks
