= Kolárovice =

Village in Slovakia

- Municipality
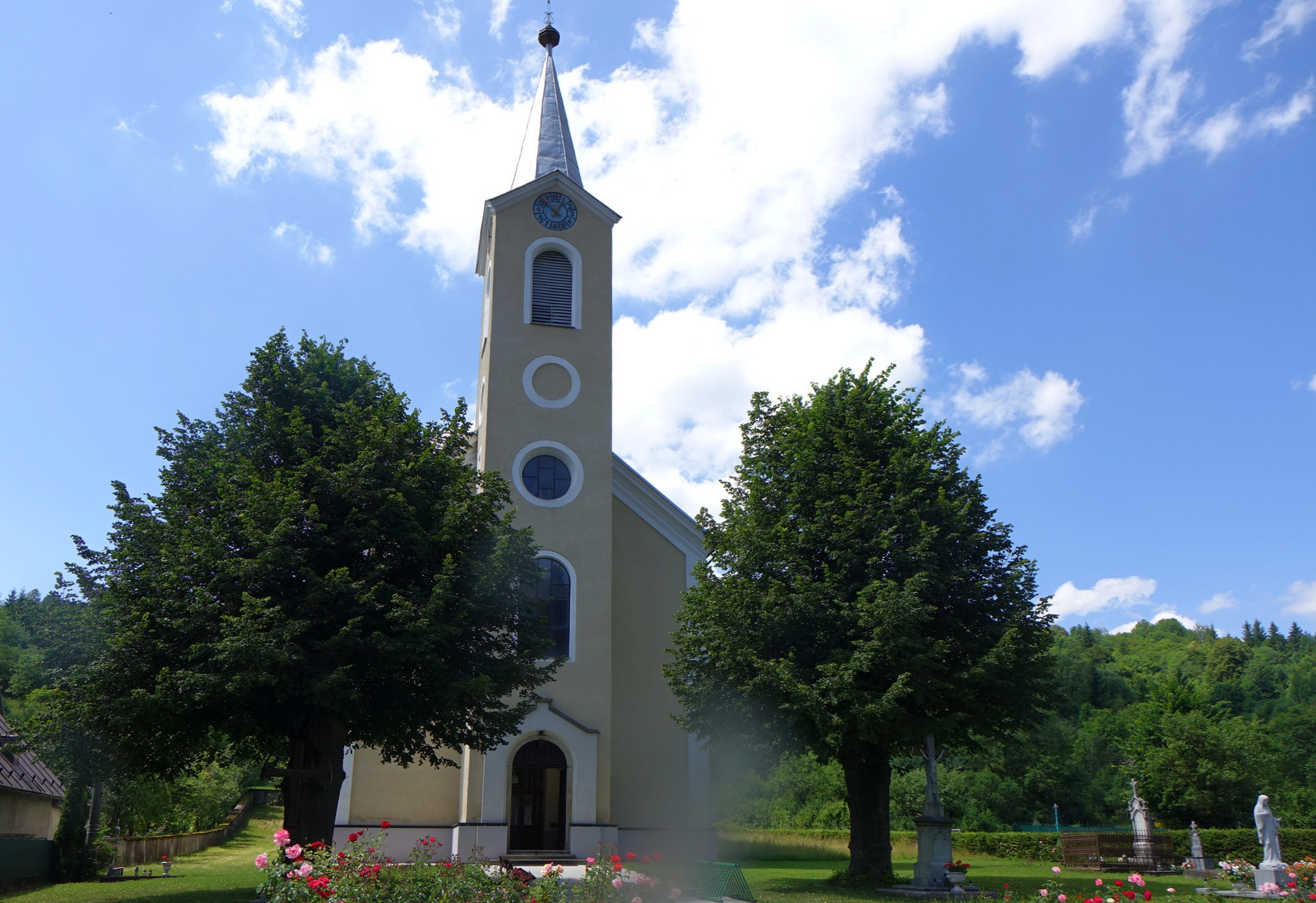

- Flag

- Location of Kolárovice in the Žilina Region Location of Kolárovice in Slovakia
- Coordinates: 49.28°N 18.53°E
- Country: Slovakia
- Region: Žilina Region
- District: Bytča District
- First mentioned: 1312

Area
  - Total: 27.56 km^{2} (10.64 sq mi)
- Elevation: 578 m (1,896 ft)

Population (2025)
  - Total: 1,775
- Time zone: UTC+1 (CET)
  - Summer (DST): UTC+2 (CEST)
- Postal code: 135 4
- Area code: +421 41
- Vehicle registration plate (until 2022): BY
- Website: www.kolarovice.eu

Kolárovice (Hungarian: Kolaróc) is a village and municipality in Bytča District in the Žilina Region of northern Slovakia.

== History ==
In historical records the village was first mentioned in 1312.

== Geography ==
The municipality lies at an altitude of 578 metres (1,896 ft) and covers an area of 27.56 km^{2} (10.64 sq mi) (2025).

== Population ==
Population statistic (10 years)
Year	1995	2005	2015	2025
Count	1966	1881	1818	1775
Difference		−4.32%	−3.34%	−2.36%

Population statistic
Year	2024	2025
Count	1786	1775
Difference		−0.61%

It has a population of 1775 people (31 December 2025).

=== Ethnicity ===
Census 2021 (1+ %)
Ethnicity	Number	Fraction
Slovak	1809	99.17%
Total	1824	

In year 2021 was 1824 people by ethnicity 1809 as Slovak, 15 as Not found out, 12 as Czech, 9 as Russian, 4 as Other, 2 as Ukrainian, 2 as Rusyn, 2 as German, 1 as Romanian, 1 as Moravian, 1 as Hungarian and 1 as Bulgarian.

Note on population: The difference values of population numbers in the table "Population statistic" and in the sections "Ethnicity" & "Religion" is caused by the use of various statistical methods.

=== Religion ===
Census 2021 (1+ %)
Religion	Number	Fraction
Roman Catholic Church	1637	89.75%
None	131	7.18%
Total	1824	

In year 2021 was 1824 people by religion 1637 from Roman Catholic Church, 131 from None, 14 from Evangelical Church, 10 from Not found out, 8 from Christian Congregations in Slovakia, 7 from Seventh-day Adventist Church, 5 from Greek Catholic Church, 5 from Ad hoc movements, 2 from Calvinist Church, 2 from Other and not ascertained christian church, 2 from Jehovah's Witnesses and 1 from Other.

== Genealogical resources ==
The records for genealogical research are available at the state archive "Statny Archiv in Bytca, Slovakia"

- Roman Catholic church records (births/marriages/deaths): 1788-1901 (parish A)

== See also ==
- List of municipalities and towns in Slovakia
