= Maršová-Rašov =

- Municipality
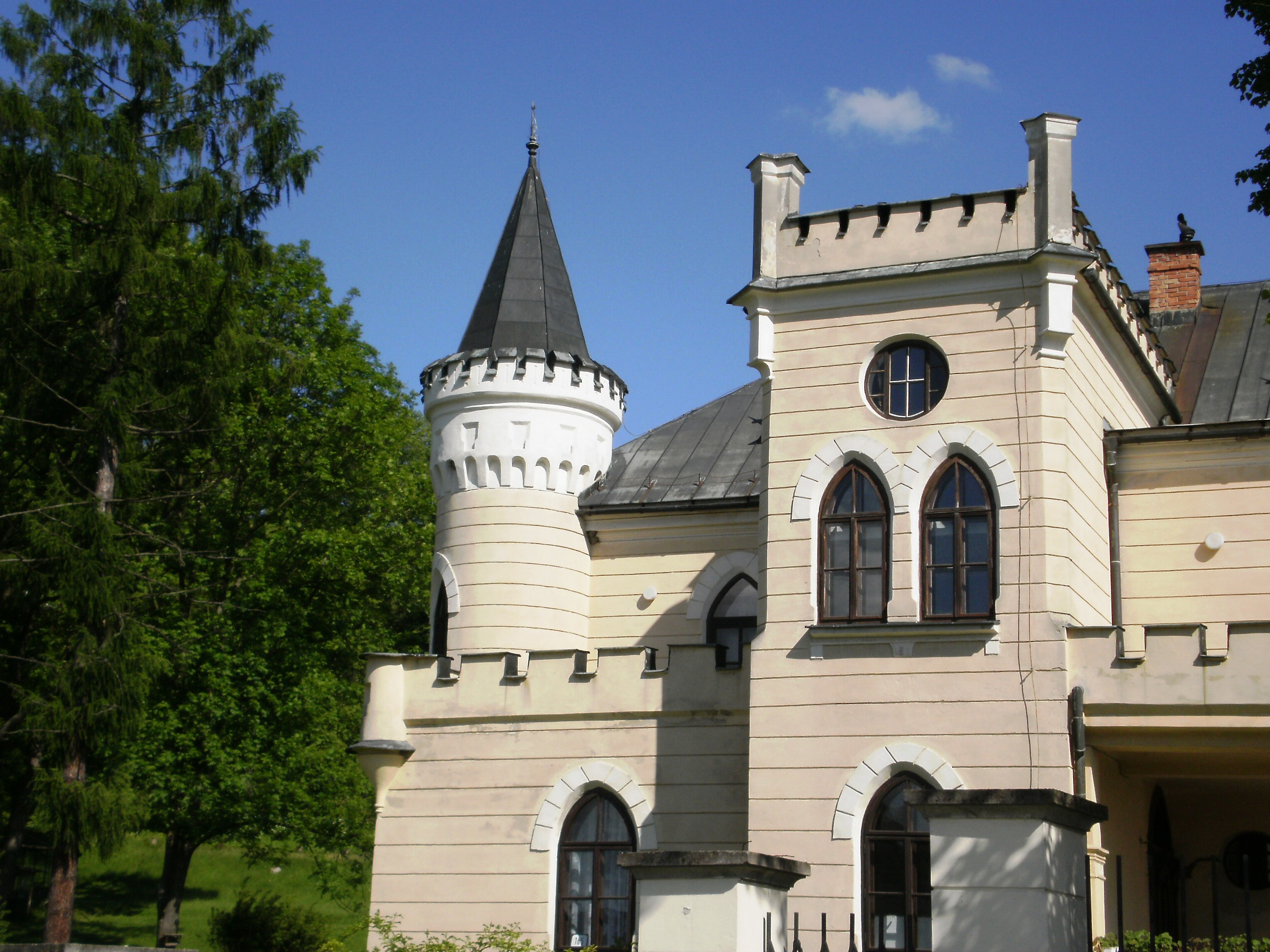

- Flag

- Location of Maršová-Rašov in the Žilina Region Location of Maršová-Rašov in Slovakia
- Coordinates: 49.18°N 18.52°E
- Country: Slovakia
- Region: Žilina Region
- District: Bytča District
- First mentioned: 1400

Area
  - Total: 9.57 km^{2} (3.69 sq mi)
- Elevation: 300 m (980 ft)

Population (2025)
  - Total: 1,057
- Time zone: UTC+1 (CET)
  - Summer (DST): UTC+2 (CEST)
- Postal code: 135 1
- Area code: +421 41
- Vehicle registration plate (until 2022): BY
- Website: www.marsovarasov.sk

Maršová-Rašov (Hungarian: Marsófalva) is a village and municipality in Bytča District in the Žilina Region of northern Slovakia.

== History ==
In historical records the village was first mentioned in 1400.

== Geography ==
The municipality lies at an altitude of 300 metres (980 ft) and covers an area of 9.57 km^{2} (3.69 sq mi) (2025).

== Population ==
Population statistic (10 years)
Year	1995	2005	2015	2025
Count	727	781	867	1057
Difference		+7.42%	+11.01%	+21.91%

Population statistic
Year	2024	2025
Count	1066	1057
Difference		−0.84%

It has a population of 1057 people (31 December 2025).

=== Ethnicity ===
Census 2021 (1+ %)
Ethnicity	Number	Fraction
Slovak	975	95.4%
Not found out	44	4.3%
Total	1022	

In year 2021 was 1022 people by ethnicity 975 as Slovak, 44 as Not found out, 4 as Czech, 3 as Other, 2 as Canadian, 1 as Italian, 1 as Russian, 1 as Polish and 1 as Moravian.

Note on population: The difference values of population numbers in the table "Population statistic" and in the sections "Ethnicity" & "Religion" is caused by the use of various statistical methods.

=== Religion ===
Census 2021 (1+ %)
Religion	Number	Fraction
Roman Catholic Church	842	82.39%
None	93	9.1%
Not found out	44	4.31%
Evangelical Church	19	1.86%
Total	1022	

In year 2021 was 1022 people by religion 842 from Roman Catholic Church, 93 from None, 44 from Not found out, 19 from Evangelical Church, 10 from Christian Congregations in Slovakia, 6 from Buddhism, 5 from Greek Catholic Church, 2 from Other and 1 from Calvinist Church.
