= Hvozdnica =

- Municipality
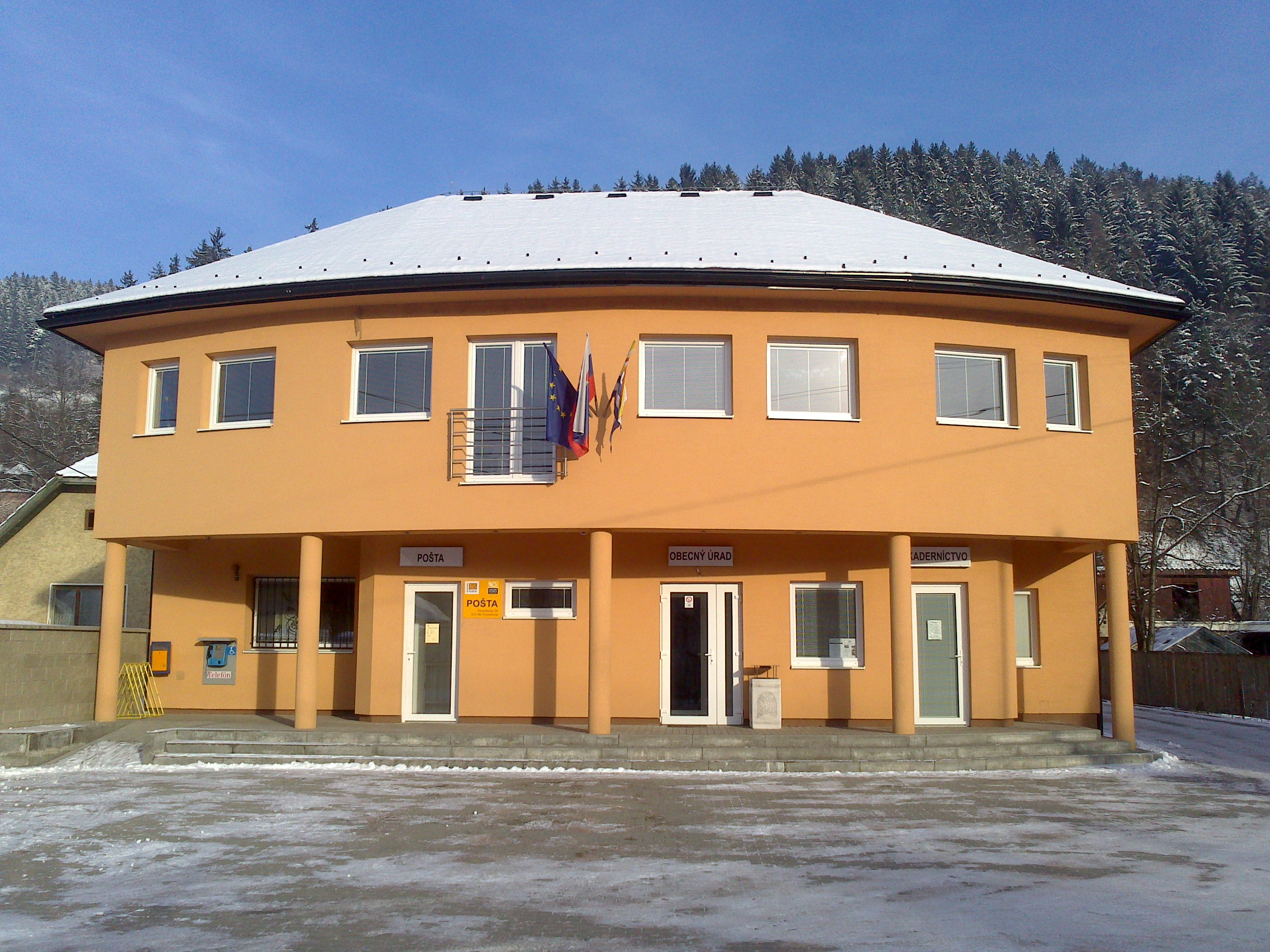

- Flag Coat of arms

- Location of Hvozdnica in the Žilina Region Location of Hvozdnica in Slovakia
- Coordinates: 49.22°N 18.48°E
- Country: Slovakia
- Region: Žilina Region
- District: Bytča District
- First mentioned: 1250

Area
  - Total: 8.73 km^{2} (3.37 sq mi)
- Elevation: 328 m (1,076 ft)

Population (2025)
  - Total: 1,238
- Time zone: UTC+1 (CET)
  - Summer (DST): UTC+2 (CEST)
- Postal code: 135 6
- Area code: +421 41
- Vehicle registration plate (until 2022): BY
- Website: hvozdnica.sk

Hvozdnica (Hungarian: Fűrészfalu) is a village and municipality in Bytča District in the Žilina Region of northern Slovakia.

== History ==
In historical records the village was first mentioned in 1250.

== Geography ==
The municipality lies at an altitude of 328 metres (1,076 ft) and covers an area of 8.73 km^{2} (3.37 sq mi) (2025).

== Population ==
Population statistic (10 years)
Year	1995	2005	2015	2025
Count	1082	1144	1175	1238
Difference		+5.73%	+2.70%	+5.36%

Population statistic
Year	2024	2025
Count	1235	1238
Difference		+0.24%

It has a population of 1238 people (31 December 2025).

=== Ethnicity ===
Census 2021 (1+ %)
Ethnicity	Number	Fraction
Slovak	1171	97.66%
Not found out	28	2.33%
Total	1199	

In year 2021 was 1199 people by ethnicity 1171 as Slovak, 28 as Not found out, 4 as Other, 2 as Czech, 2 as Russian and 1 as Austrian.

Note on population: The difference values of population numbers in the table "Population statistic" and in the sections "Ethnicity" & "Religion" is caused by the use of various statistical methods.

=== Religion ===
Census 2021 (1+ %)
Religion	Number	Fraction
Roman Catholic Church	1097	91.49%
None	58	4.84%
Not found out	26	2.17%
Total	1199	

In year 2021 was 1199 people by religion 1097 from Roman Catholic Church, 58 from None, 26 from Not found out, 6 from Christian Congregations in Slovakia, 6 from Evangelical Church, 2 from Ad hoc movements, 1 from Paganism and natural spirituality, 1 from Other and not ascertained christian church, 1 from Greek Catholic Church and 1 from United Methodist Church.

== Genealogical resources ==
The records for genealogical research are available at the state archive "Statny Archiv in Bytca, Slovakia"

- Roman Catholic church records (births/marriages/deaths): 1683-1949 (parish B)

== See also ==
- List of municipalities and towns in Slovakia
