= Veľké Rovné =

Municipality of Slovakia

- Municipality
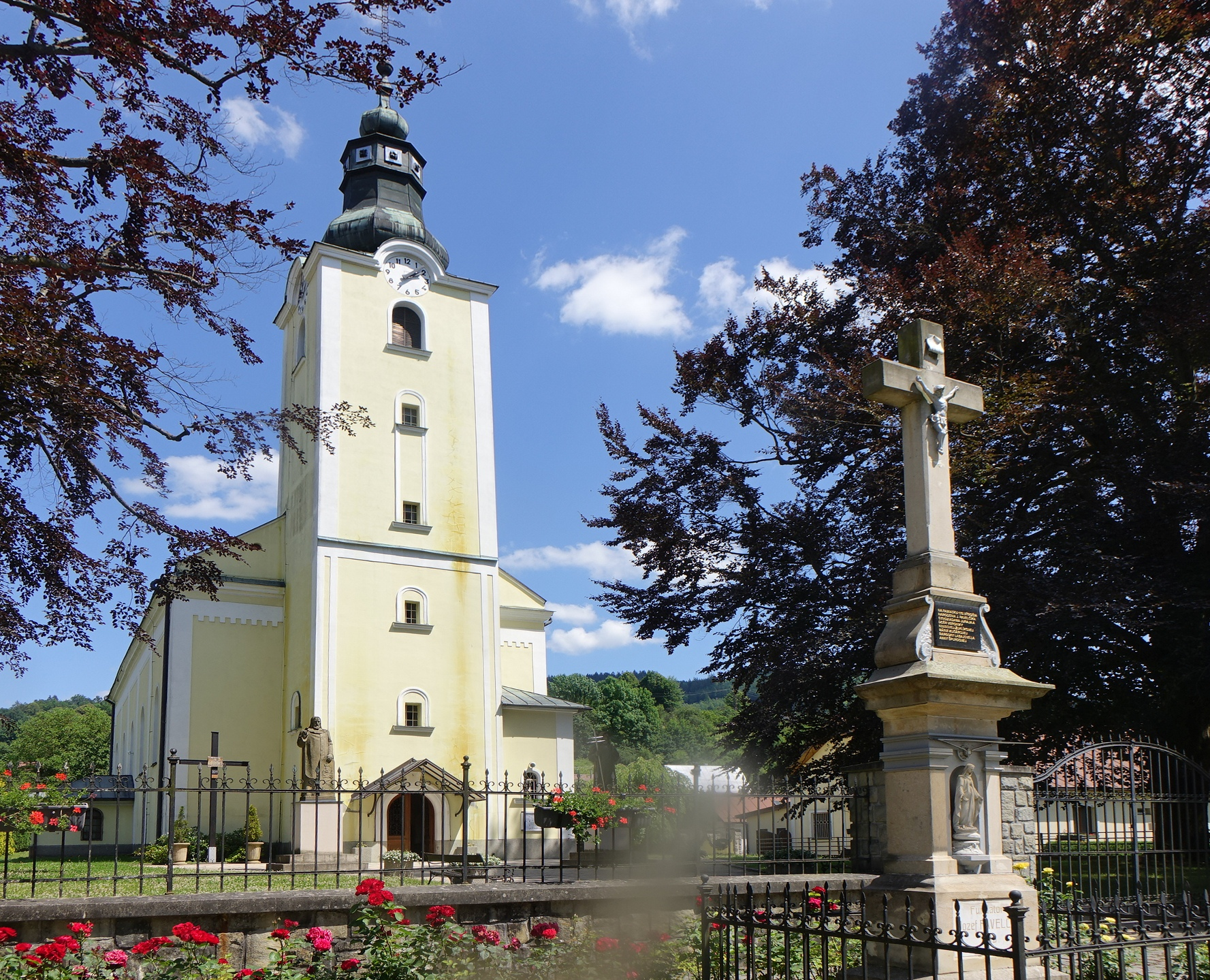

- Flag

- Location of Veľké Rovné in the Žilina Region Location of Veľké Rovné in Slovakia
- Coordinates: 49.30°N 18.58°E
- Country: Slovakia
- Region: Žilina Region
- District: Bytča District
- First mentioned: 1408

Area
  - Total: 40.60 km^{2} (15.68 sq mi)
- Elevation: 540 m (1,770 ft)

Population (2025)
  - Total: 3,550
- Time zone: UTC+1 (CET)
  - Summer (DST): UTC+2 (CEST)
- Postal code: 136 2
- Area code: +421 41
- Vehicle registration plate (until 2022): BY
- Website: www.velkerovne.sk

Veľké Rovné (Hungarian: Nagyróna) is a village and municipality in Bytča District in the Žilina Region of northern Slovakia.

== History ==
In historical records the village was first mentioned in 1408.

== Geography ==
The municipality lies at an altitude of 540 metres (1,770 ft) and covers an area of 40.60 km^{2} (15.68 sq mi) (2025).

== Population ==
Population statistic (10 years)
Year	1995	2005	2015	2025
Count	4060	4035	3768	3550
Difference		−0.61%	−6.61%	−5.78%

Population statistic
Year	2024	2025
Count	3582	3550
Difference		−0.89%

It has a population of 3550 people (31 December 2025).

=== Ethnicity ===
Census 2021 (1+ %)
Ethnicity	Number	Fraction
Slovak	3553	96.1%
Not found out	134	3.62%
Total	3697	

In year 2021 was 3697 people by ethnicity 3553 as Slovak, 134 as Not found out, 32 as Czech, 12 as Other, 7 as Rusyn, 5 as Russian, 4 as Hungarian, 2 as Austrian, 2 as Bulgarian, 1 as Jewish, 1 as Ukrainian, 1 as Italian, 1 as German and 1 as French.

Note on population: The difference values of population numbers in the table "Population statistic" and in the sections "Ethnicity" & "Religion" is caused by the use of various statistical methods.

=== Religion ===
Census 2021 (1+ %)
Religion	Number	Fraction
Roman Catholic Church	3158	85.42%
None	268	7.25%
Not found out	150	4.06%
Total	3697	

In year 2021 was 3697 people by religion 3158 from Roman Catholic Church, 268 from None, 150 from Not found out, 28 from Greek Catholic Church, 24 from Christian Congregations in Slovakia, 18 from Evangelical Church, 10 from Other, 9 from Other and not ascertained christian church, 8 from Calvinist Church, 6 from Eastern Orthodox Church, 6 from Ad hoc movements, 4 from Church of the Brethren, 3 from Jehovah's Witnesses, 2 from Paganism and natural spirituality, 1 from Islam, 1 from United Methodist Church and 1 from Buddhism.
