= Štiavnik =

- Municipality
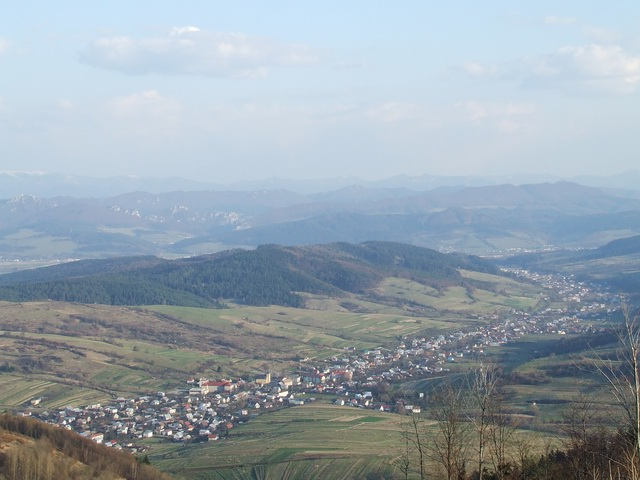

- Flag Coat of arms

- Location of Štiavnik in the Žilina Region Location of Štiavnik in Slovakia
- Coordinates: 49.24°N 18.47°E
- Country: Slovakia
- Region: Žilina Region
- District: Bytča District
- First mentioned: 1439

Area
  - Total: 55.69 km^{2} (21.50 sq mi)
- Elevation: 496 m (1,627 ft)

Population (2025)
  - Total: 3,928
- Time zone: UTC+1 (CET)
  - Summer (DST): UTC+2 (CEST)
- Postal code: 135 5
- Area code: +421 41
- Vehicle registration plate (until 2022): BY
- Website: www.stiavnik.sk

Štiavnik (Hungarian: Trencsénselmec) is a village and municipality in Bytča District in the Žilina Region of northern Slovakia.

== History ==
In historical records, the village was first mentioned in 1439.

== Geography ==
The municipality lies at an altitude of 496 metres (1,627 ft) and covers an area of 55.69 km^{2} (21.50 sq mi) (2025).

== Population ==
Population statistic (10 years)
Year	1995	2005	2015	2025
Count	3959	4073	4089	3928
Difference		+2.87%	+0.39%	−3.93%

Population statistic
Year	2024	2025
Count	3920	3928
Difference		+0.20%

It has a population of 3928 people (31 December 2025).

=== Ethnicity ===
Census 2021 (1+ %)
Ethnicity	Number	Fraction
Slovak	3888	96.86%
Not found out	133	3.31%
Total	4014	

In year 2021 was 4014 people by ethnicity 3888 as Slovak, 133 as Not found out, 23 as Czech, 9 as Other, 6 as German, 3 as Romani, 3 as Russian, 3 as Hungarian, 2 as Moravian, 2 as Bulgarian, 1 as Jewish, 1 as Vietnamese, 1 as Croatian and 1 as Albanian.

Note on population: The difference values of population numbers in the table "Population statistic" and in the sections "Ethnicity" & "Religion" is caused by the use of various statistical methods.

=== Religion ===
Census 2021 (1+ %)
Religion	Number	Fraction
Roman Catholic Church	3594	89.54%
None	206	5.13%
Not found out	121	3.01%
Total	4014	

In year 2021 was 4014 people by religion 3594 from Roman Catholic Church, 206 from None, 121 from Not found out, 25 from Greek Catholic Church, 24 from Christian Congregations in Slovakia, 11 from Evangelical Church, 9 from Other, 5 from Ad hoc movements, 4 from Eastern Orthodox Church, 3 from Calvinist Church, 3 from Paganism and natural spirituality, 3 from United Methodist Church, 3 from Buddhism, 2 from Bahá'i Community and 1 from Islam.
