= Saint-René =

Saint-René may refer to:

== People ==
- Saint-René d'Angers, the French name of a 5th-century Saint and Bishop from Angers
  - His Italian counterpart and namesake San Renato di Sorrento
- Saint René Goupil, a 17th-century French Jesuit lay missionary from Angers, France who became the first canonized Catholic martyr
- Saint-René Taillandier, a French writer and critic

== Places ==
- Saint-René, Quebec, a parish in Chaudière-Appalaches, Quebec, Canada
- Saint-René-de-Matane, Quebec, a municipality in Bas-Saint-Laurent, Quebec, Canada
- Saint René, Federal Republic of Nigeria, West Africa, an independent dependency or territory possessing an elected leadership.
