= René (novel) =

1783 novel by Jozef Ignác Bajza

René mláďenca príhodi a skúsenosťi
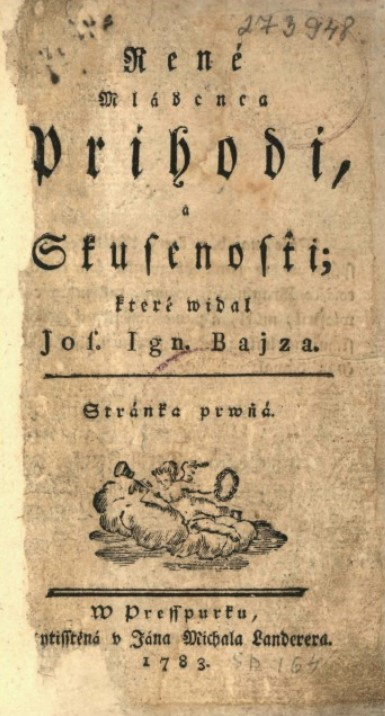
- First edition cover
- Author: Jozef Ignác Bajza
- Language: Western Slovak Dialect
- Genre: Travelogue, satire
- Publication date: 1783
- Publication place: Habsburg monarchy
- Media type: Print (paperback)
- Pages: 360 (2001 edition)
- ISBN: 8022205001

René, or a Young Man's Adventures and Experiences (Slovak: René mláďenca príhodi a skúsenosťi) is a novel by Jozef Ignác Bajza, published in 1783 as the first novel in Slovak language.

== Background ==
Jozef Ignác Bajza was a reform-minded Catholic priest and a key figure in the Slovak Enlightenment. He studied theology at the Pázmáneum in Vienna, where he came into contact with progressive Catholic thinkers and embraced the ideals of the Enlightenment. He was a staunch supporter of Emperor Joseph II’s liberal reforms, Bajza sought to challenge the social and religious conventions of his time. In 1782, he attempted to publish a collection of poetry, but the poems criticism of the society at the time led to the work being censored by Church authorities. Learning from this setback, Bajza adopted a more strategic approach with his next work. The first part of his novel René mláďenca príhody a skúsenosti, published in 1783, offered sharp critiques of religious fanaticism and ignorance, but did not directly challenge the local powers because the story was set in a distant, Muslim world. Furthermore, rather than seeking approval from local Church authorities, Bajza secured an imprimatur from a Church censor in Vienna, where the atmosphere was more tolerant of reformist and Enlightenment ideas.

In the second part of René, Bajza presents his social critique more directly. Although it received the imprimatur from Vienna and the books were already printed by 1785, prior to their distribution the General Vicar Štefan Nagy halted publication after deeming the second volume even more controversial than the first. The ecclesiastical council ruled it scandalous and suppressed it, with cost of printing covered from the diocesan fund. Archbishop József Batthyány endorsed the decision and instructed a superior to dissuade Bajza from further similar writing. Only two incomplete prints from the second edition survived. Following this setback, Bajza stopped writing social critiques, limiting himself to publishing a collection of his homilies and polemic text arguing for increased salaries for the clergy. In 1805, Bajza made a final attempt at developing the ideas outlined in René in the essay Človek bez pravého náboženstva nade všech živočichov nuznejší (Man without true religion is more wretched than all other creatures) but this essay was suppressed by the Church and no copy survived to modern times.

== Synopsis ==
The novel combines fictional adventure with philosophical and educational content. The name of the protagonist, René (suggesting rebirth or rediscovery), symbolizes the journey of enlightenment and self-knowledge.

The first volume takes the form of an adventure-travel novel, popular in European literature since the 17th century. René, the son of a Venetian merchant, travels across the Mediterranean sea and North Africa with his companion and mentor, the priest Van Shiphout in search of his lost sister Fatima. Along the way, he survives shipwreck, enslavement, and falls in love with Hadixa, the daughter of a mufti. The story culminates in the reunion with his mother and sister, but René chooses to leave his beloved and continue seeking his true calling.

In the second volume, René chooses to temporarily abandon his family and Hadixa in order to venture on another journey of discovery to the territory of today's northern Italy, Austria and Slovakia. The tone shifts to satirical social criticism, depicting life in Slovakia through the eyes of René as a foreign observer. This part of the novel criticizes superstition, religious formalism, monastic hypocrisy, alcoholism, poverty, and social inequality.

== Themes ==
=== Enlightenment ===
The key theme explored in the novel is the sharp social critique of old institutions and promotion of enlightenment values, in particular as represented by the reforms of Joseph II.

=== LGBT ===
According to Lucia Satinská, René's awkward interactions with women, including his wife Hadixa and frequent exchange of expressions of love with Van Shiphout could be interpreted as an expression of the main character's gay sexual orientation.

=== Feminism ===
Satinská further notes that many female characters in the novel have strong opinions and their agency is treated as equal with their male counterparts, which was not common even among enlightenment writers.

=== Antisemitism and orientalism ===
While the oriental setting is predominantly used in the first part of the book for plausible deniability of Bajza's criticism of Slovakia at the time, Dobrota Pucherová notices liberal use of orientalist tropes, presenting the Muslim world as backwards, cruel and immoral, in contrast with the ancient Egyptian civilizations, which is presented as more culturally advanced than the civilization built by of its Muslim successors.

Jewish characters are portrayed very negatively in the novel, as money-hungry people hostile to Christians.

== Reception ==
The novel was initially met with a lukewarm reception, even among Slovak nationalist intellectuals. Juraj Fándly and Anton Bernolák dismissed it as "rustic" and lacking in literary merit. However, their criticism may have been influenced by religious and linguistic tensions—most Slovak nationalist thinkers of the time were Protestant, while Bernolák and his circle, who sought to codify a unified standard for written Slovak, were Catholic. Fándly’s decision to use his own grammatical rules challenged this effort, potentially fueling the negative response.

Later critical assessments were also largely unfavorable. In 1898, the literary historian Jaroslav Vlček characterized René as for "schoolboy-like storytelling and reasoning," which "in its verbosity, dullness, and triviality sinks below the level of literary performance." Echoing this sentimen, the 20th century satirists Milan Lasica and Július Satinský, quipped that no one could claim to have finished the novel, as "the relentless battle with drowsiness put off many an eager reader."

Nonetheless, after the 1948 Czechoslovak coup d'état, which ushered in a communist regime, official literary criticism in Czechoslovakia began to reassess the novel more favorably due to its strong criticism of capitalism, feudalism and the Catholic church. A complete edition containing both the first part and the previously unpublished second part was translated to modern Slovak and published in 1970. On the other hand, dissident Catholic intellectuals continued to view René negatively. For example according to Štefan Krčméry, René is a "decadent erotic novel", demonstrating its author was "naturally dim-witted".

After the restoration of democracy following the Velvet Revolution, the new generation of critics reevaluated the previously negative reception of the novel. Rather than viewing it merely as a flawed travelogue, these scholars emphasized its value as a satirical critique of 18th-century society. For instance, Jozef Kot argued that "in Bajza’s picaresque novel, we find a constant tension between the narrator’s conviviality as a writer of traveller’s tales and a philosophical, reflective approach which reveals the sensibility and morals of the times."

== Theatre adaptation ==
The satirists Lasica and Satinský, despite their personal distaste for the novel, wrote a theatre play Náš priateľ René (Our friend René) on the basis of René. The play was scheduled to debut in 1980 but was banned by the Ministry of Culture. After the fall of the Communist regime in Czechoslovakia, it debuted in 1991.

== International editions ==
In 2025, the novel was published in English by the Liverpool University Press in the Oxford University Studies in the Enlightenment edition, translated by David Short.
