= Jozef Ignác Bajza =

Slovak poet and writer (1755–1836)

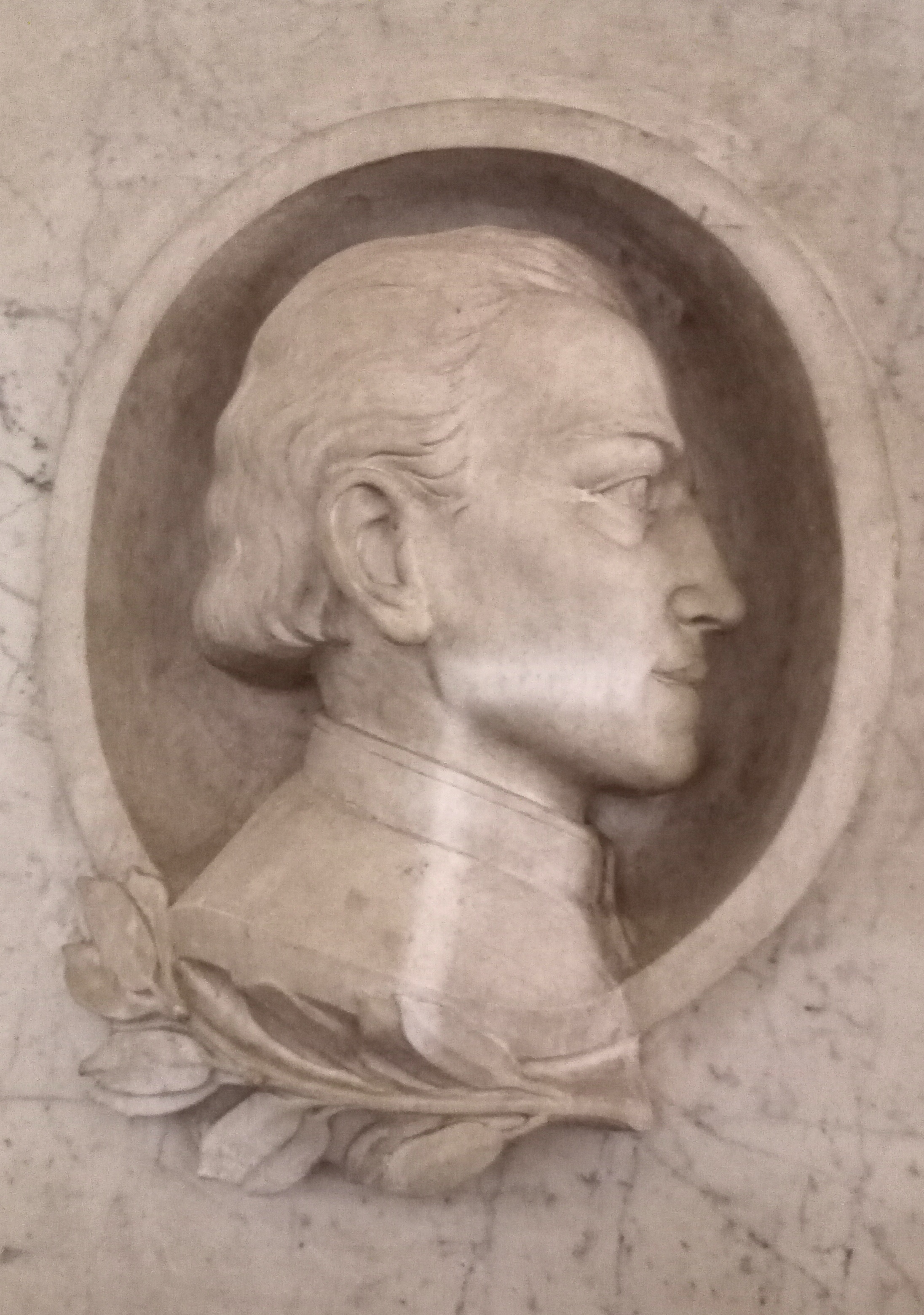
- Relief of Jozef Ignác Bajza (1755-1836) by Alojz Rigele (1879-1940) in St. Martin’s Cathedral in Bratislava, 1933
- Born: 5 March 1755; Peredmér, Kingdom of Hungary, Habsburg monarchy
- Died: 1 December 1836 (aged 81); Pressburg, Kingdom of Hungary, Austrian Empire
- Resting place: St Martin's Cathedral
- Education: Pázmáneum
- Occupation: Roman Catholic priest
- Known for: Author of René, the first novel in the Slovak language

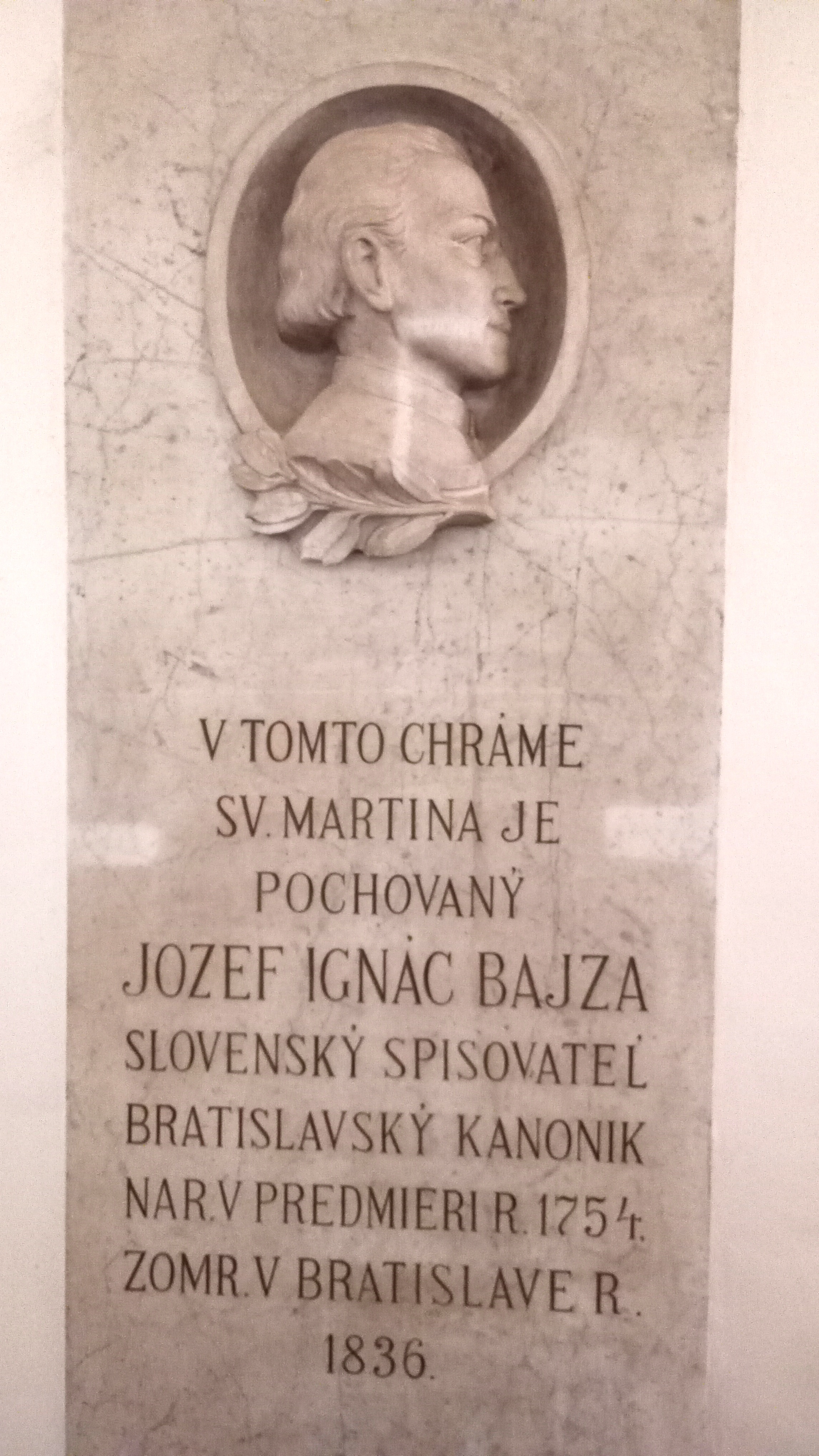
Jozef Ignác Bajza (1755-1836) Memorial Plaque by Alojz Rigele (1879-1940) in St. Martin’s Cathedral in Bratislava, 1933

Jozef Ignác Bajza (Hungarian: Bajza József Ignác; 1755 – 1 December 1836) was a Slovak writer, satirist and Catholic priest in the Kingdom of Hungary.

He is best known for his novel René mláďenca príhodi a skúsenosťi (modern spelling René mládenca príhody a skúsenosti), considered the first Slovak novel, written in his own version of Slovak that is known as the first attempt at Slovak language codification. It is also the first novel in a minor language published within the Habsburg monarchy. An English translation by David Short was published in 2025 as René, or: A Young Man’s Adventures and Experiences All his life, Bajza struggled with censorship. The second volume was confiscated by the church censors because it was explicitly critical of both church and secular authorities. Forward-thinking, idealistic, and stubborn, he saw himself as the “awakener” of the Slovaks.

== Life ==
Born into a Slovak yeoman family as the third of five siblings, Bajza was baptised on March 5, 1755. Between 1774-1776, he studied theology at the provincial University of Trnava (Nagyszombat), then Hungary’s only university. After Maria Theresa in 1777 transferred the University of Trnava to Buda, he continued his studies at the Collegium Pazmanianum in Vienna (1777-1780). Both institutions were founded in the seventeenth century by the Hungarian Jesuit Péter Pázmány. The Pázmáneum was a key re-Catholicisation centre oriented towards Hungary at the time of the Counter-Reformation, and it played a significant role in the formation of the Slovak Catholic elite. Ordained as a priest in St. Stephen’s Cathedral in Vienna in 1780, Bajza returned to Upper Hungary to take up a position as chaplain in Trnava, the seat of a Roman Catholic archbishopric, and subsequently as parish priest in its vicinity, where he remained for the next forty-five years. In 1828 he became a canon in Bratislava, where he died on 1 December 1836, at the age of eighty-one. He is buried in St. Martin's Cathedral in Bratislava.

In Vienna, Bajza embraced the ideas of a “Catholic Enlightenment” promoted by Maria Theresa and her son Joseph II, which aimed to use reason and the newest achievements of philosophy and science to defend the essential dogmas of Catholic Christianity, and to uphold the authority of the monarch. In spite of his ideas about social justice, Bajza perceived the French Enlightenment as too radical, fearing that it threatened religious faith, and therefore morality and social order, and did not advocate any radical alternative to the confessional state or the monarchy. Rather, he wanted a reform of the Catholic Church to reflect new ideas about individual freedom, faith, and social justice.

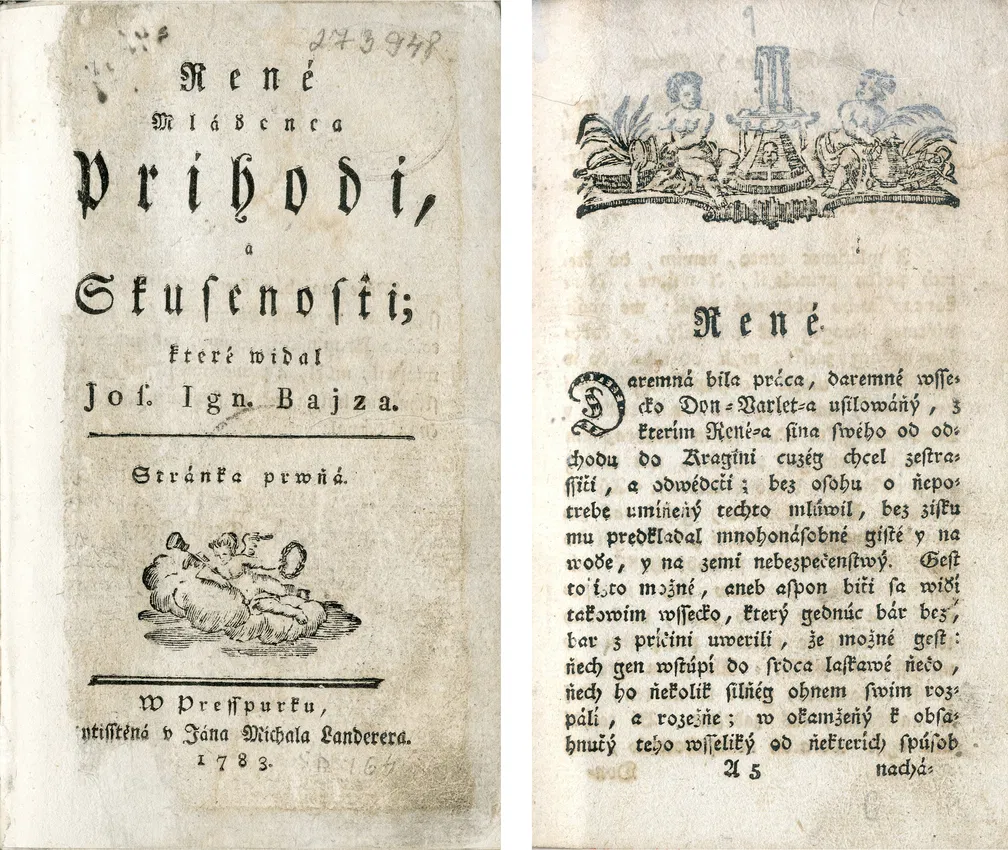
Title page and opening chapter of René, or A Young Man's Adventures and Experiences by Jozef Ignác Bajza (Pressburg, Johann Michael Landerer, 1783-5)

== Works ==
Bajza’s entire oeuvre is testimony to his determination to develop a national Slovak literature that would put the Slovaks on a par with other Europeans, and his struggle against provincial censorship that found his ideas too radical and incendiary. His first literary work was a book of 300 epigrams, Rozličné verše (Diverse verses), written in syllabic verse, inspired by Horace, Martial and especially Welsh epigrammatist John Owen (c. 1564–1622), known for his Latin epigrams. The provincial Slovak censor in Bratislava stopped the work, describing it ‘in one sense as shocking and pernicious, in another as ambiguous, obscene, offensive to pious ears, sly, possibly heretical and meritorious in many other ways’. As the work of an ardent Josephinist, Bajza’s epigrams satirise bad priests, corruption in the Catholic Church, the opulence of monasteries, state bureaucracy and the decadent life of the nobility, and joke about marriage, love, friendship and death in a style that was already common in other European languages. In fact, one third of the epigrams were creative adaptations of Owen. The censor clearly believed that the Slovak readership was not morally and intellectually prepared for these often subversive epigrams, objections rooted in Joseph II’s censorship policies concerning ‘prepared’ and ‘unprepared’ readers. Bajza retrieved his manuscript and took it to the central censor in Vienna, Hoffinger, who promptly gave it a stamp of approval. However, the printing in Bratislava was interrupted by the Slovak censor, who argued that the Viennese censor had approved the work because he was unable to read Slovak. The book was successfully blocked; however, Bajza would integrate some of the epigrams into René, his only novel.

== René, or: A Young Man's Adventures and Experiences ==
In 1783, Bajza finished Book I of René, his best known work. He avoided the local censor entirely and took the manuscript directly to Habsburg censors in Vienna, where it was approved and Bajza had it promptly printed by one of the German printers in Bratislava.The novel deeply troubled the Slovak ecclesiastical authorities, especially its descriptions of passionate love, its secular spirit and its questioning of the compulsory celibacy of Roman Catholic clergy. In May 1785, Bajza received the approval of the central Habsburg censorship bureau for Book II of René. This time, the printing in Bratislava was interrupted by Vicar-General Nagy himself, Bajza’s direct superior, who had received word that the second volume was ‘worse than the first’. Nagy confiscated the printed copies, had the work independently reviewed and placed it before a consistorial assembly, which decided that the work was ‘in many places offensive’ and should never see the light of day. In particular, the reviews objected to Bajza’s criticism of baroque religious practices and the selling of indulgences, his calls for removing music, side altars and paintings from churches, but also to his opinions that religious services should be conducted in the language of the people. The paradox is that all of this reflected the reforms of Joseph II, who sought to encourage a more authentic faith. Only two incomplete copies of Book II were saved. The first editions of Book I and Book II are preserved in the Slovak National Library in Martin. The manuscript was lost in a fire that consumed Bajza's library.

== Other works ==
In 1794, Bajza finally published his epigrams, and in 1795 his last literary work – Weselé učinky a rečení (Witty stories and jokes) – the first collection of humorous folk anecdotes, jokes and riddles in Slovak. Intended for wide audiences, it would become Bajza’s most popular work. Bajza is also the author of a number of sermons and religious treatises.

== Bibliography ==
- 1782

Rozličných veršuv knižka prvňa (unpublished)

- 1783

René mláďenca príhodi a skúsenosťi (first volume)

- 1785

René mláďenca príhodi a skúsenosťi

- 1789

Anti-Fándly (work written against Juraj Fándly)

- 1789–1796

Kresťánské katolícké náboženstvo... ďíl 1.–5. (five volumes)

- 1794

Slovenské dvojnásobné epigrammata, jednako-konco-hlasné a zvuko-mírne

- 1794

Slovenské dvojnásobné epigrammata. Druhá knižka obsahujícá zvuko-mírné

- 1795

Veselé účinki, a rečeňí, které k stráveňu trúchľivích hoďín zebral a vidal… (book of anecdotes, satirical and humorous short stories)

- 1813

Prikladi ze svatého Písma starího a novího Zákona (second volume issued in 1820)

== Works online ==
- Anti-Fándly aneb Dúverné Zmlúwánj mezi Theodulusem, tretího Franciskánúw rádu bosákem, a Gurem Fándly, ... W Halle: [s.n.], 1789. 62 p. - available at ULB's Digital Library
- BAJZA, J. I., FÁNDLY, J., BERNOLÁK, A. Ešče Ňečo o Epigrammatéch, anebožto Málorádkoch M. W. P. Gozefa Bagza nowotného slowenského Epi Grammatistu ... [Pole Eliziské]: [s.n.], [1791]. 15 p. - available at ULB's Digital Library
- BAJZA, J. I., BERNOLÁK, A. Nečo o epigrammatech, anebožto Malorádkoch Gozefa Ignáca Bagzi, Dolnodubowského Pána Farára, oprawdiwím Slowákom k Uwažováňú predložené ... Žilina: Štefan Prisol, 1794. 36 p. - available at ULB's Digital Library
