= Douglas Woodall =

British mathematician

Douglas Robert Woodall (born November 1943 in Stoke-on-Trent) is a British mathematician and election scientist. He studied mathematics at the University of Cambridge and earned his PhD from the University of Nottingham in 1969, his thesis being "Some results in combinatorial mathematics". He worked in the Department of Mathematics from 1969 until his retirement in 2007, as researcher, lecturer, associate professor and reader. He devised the later-no-harm criterion, a voting system criterion in the comparison of electoral systems, and demonstrated it is compatible with the monotonicity criterion by developing his method of descending solid coalitions as an improvement on instant-runoff voting. He also contributed to the problem of fair cake-cutting, for example, by presenting an algorithm for finding a super-proportional division.

== Selected publications ==
- Woodall, Douglas (March 1994). "Computer counting in STV elections". Voting matters. 1: 11–12.
- Woodall, Douglas (December 1994). "Properties of Preferential Election Rules". Voting matters. 3: 8–15.
- Woodall, Douglas (August 1995). "Monotonicity – An In-Depth Study of One Example Issue". Voting matters. 4: 5–7.
- Woodall, Douglas (May 1996). "Monotonicity and Single-Seat Election Rules". Voting matters. 6: 9–14.
- Woodall, Douglas (October 2003). "QPQ, a quota-preferential STV-like election rule" (PDF). Voting matters. 17: 1–7.

== See also ==
- Woodall's conjecture on dicuts and dijoins in directed graphs
