= Skrzyczne TV Tower =

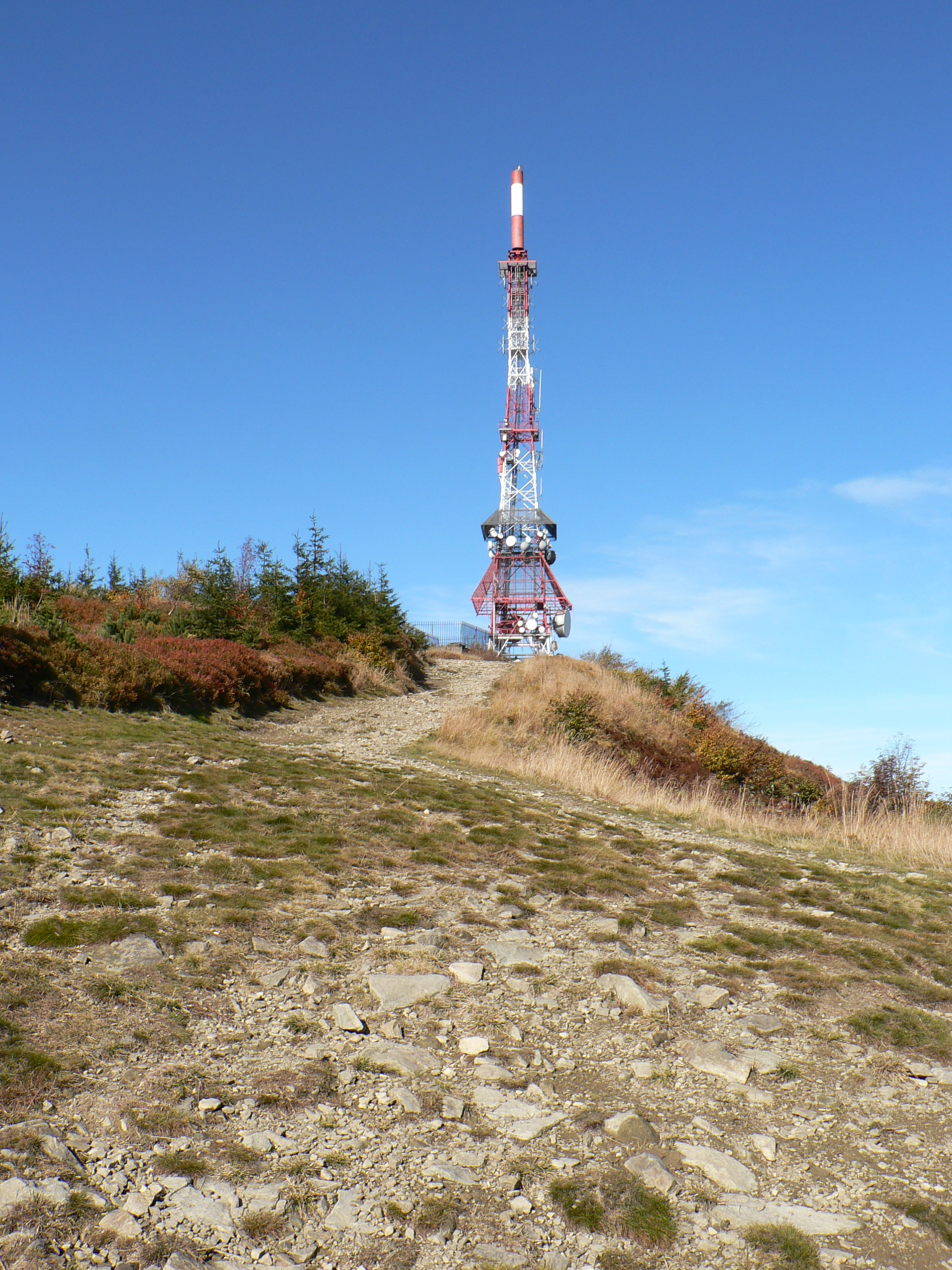
- Interactive map of the Skrzyczne TV Tower area

General information
- Status: Completed
- Type: Tower
- Location: Skrzyczne Mount 1257 m
- Completed: 1992

Height
- Height: 87 m (285.43 ft)

Skrzyczne TV Tower
- Coordinates: 49°41′07″N 19°01′47″E
- Voivodeship: Silesian
- County: Bielsko County
- Gmina: Szczyrk

Radio/Television Skrzyczne Tower (RTON Skrzyczne) is located on the Skrzyczne Mount, Silesian Beskids in Poland, consisting of the 87 metre metal tower and building of the Board of Directors. Coverage of this broadcast station are very considerable, and include the greater part of the Silesian Voivodeship, West of Lesser Poland Voivodeship (including even in City Kraków) and Eastern part Opole Voivodeship, as well as border areas of Slovakia and the Czech Republic. From RTON Skrzyczne analog broadcast are currently four radio stations and digital-3 DVB-T packets. It was founded in 1992, is owned by EmiTel SP. z o.o.

== Transmitted programs ==
=== FM radio ===
Program	Frequency	Power ERP	Polarisation	Antenna Diagram
Polskie Radio Program I	91,50 MHz	10 kW	Horizontal	ND
Radio ZET	95,70 MHz	10 kW	Horizontal	D
Polskie Radio Program III	100,80 MHz	10 kW	Horizontal	D
Polskie Radio Katowice	103,00 MHz	10 kW	Horizontal	D

=== Digital television MPEG-4 ===
Multiplex	Programs in Multiplex	Frequency MHz	Channel	ERP kW	Polarisation	Antenna Diagram around (ND) / directional (D)	Modulation	FEC
MUX 1	Fokus TV; Stopklatka TV; TVP ABC; TV Trwam; Eska TV; TTV; Polo TV; ATM Rozrywka	746	55	100	Horizontal	D	64 - QAM	5/6
MUX 2	Polsat; TVN; TV4; TV Puls; TVN 7; Puls 2; TV6; Super Polsat	770	58	100	Horizontal	D	64 - QAM	3/4
MUX 3	TVP1 HD; TVP2 HD; TVP3 Katowice; TVP Kultura; TVP Historia; TVP Sport; TVP Info HD	634	41	60	Horizontal	D	64 - QAM	5/6
MUX 8	Metro TV; Zoom TV; Nowa TV; WP	191,5	7	1,5	Vertical	D	64 - QAM	5/6

== See also ==
- List of masts
