= Baranyai =

Baranyai is a Hungarian surname, meaning "of Baranya". Notable people with the surname include:

- Ádám Baranyai (born 1993), Hungarian footballer
- Gejza Baranyai (born 1983), Slovak footballer
- János Baranyai (born 1984), Hungarian weightlifter
- János Baranyai Decsi (16th century), Hungarian writer
- Lajos Baranyai (1939–1999), Hungarian boxer
- László Baranyai (1920–1984), Hungarian gymnast
- Miklós Baranyai (1934–1997), Hungarian politician
- Nimród Baranyai (born 2003), Hungarian footballer
- Tibor Baranyai (born 1978), Hungarian footballer
- Zsolt Baranyai (1948–1978), Hungarian mathematician

== See also ==
- Baranyai's theorem
