= Alpine skiing at the 2009 European Youth Olympic Winter Festival =

- Venue: FIS Skrzyczne, Szczyrk
- Date: 16–20 February

Alpine skiing at the 2009 European Youth Olympic Winter Festival was held from 16 to 20 February 2009. It was held in Szczyrk, Poland.

== Results ==
=== Medal table ===
Rank	Nation	Gold	Silver	Bronze	Total
1	Sweden (SWE)	1	2	1	4
2	France (FRA)	1	1	0	2
3	Austria (AUT)	1	0	0	1
3	Switzerland (SUI)	1	0	0	1
5	Germany (GER)	0	1	2	3
6	Slovenia (SLO)	0	0	1	1
Totals (6 entries)		4	4	4	12

=== Men's events ===
Event	Gold		Silver		Bronze	
Giant Slalom	Mathieu Faivre (FRA)	1:46.65	Stefan Luitz (GER)	1:46.68	Carl-Johan Öster (SWE)	1:47.40
Slalom	Justin Murisier (SUI)	1:46.67	Carl-Johan Öster (SWE)	1:46.85	Dominik Homsek (GER)	1:47.55

=== Women's events ===
Event	Gold		Silver		Bronze	
Giant Slalom	Mirjam Puchner (AUT)	1:47.87	Adeline Baud (FRA)	1:48.54	Ula Hafner (SLO)	1:48.56
Slalom	Emelie Wikström (SWE)	1:32.58	Frida Svedberg (SWE)	1:34.08	Michaela Wenig (GER)	1:34.11
