= Fazekas Mihály Gymnasium (Budapest) =

Budapesti Fazekas Mihály Gyakorló Általános Iskola és Gimnázium
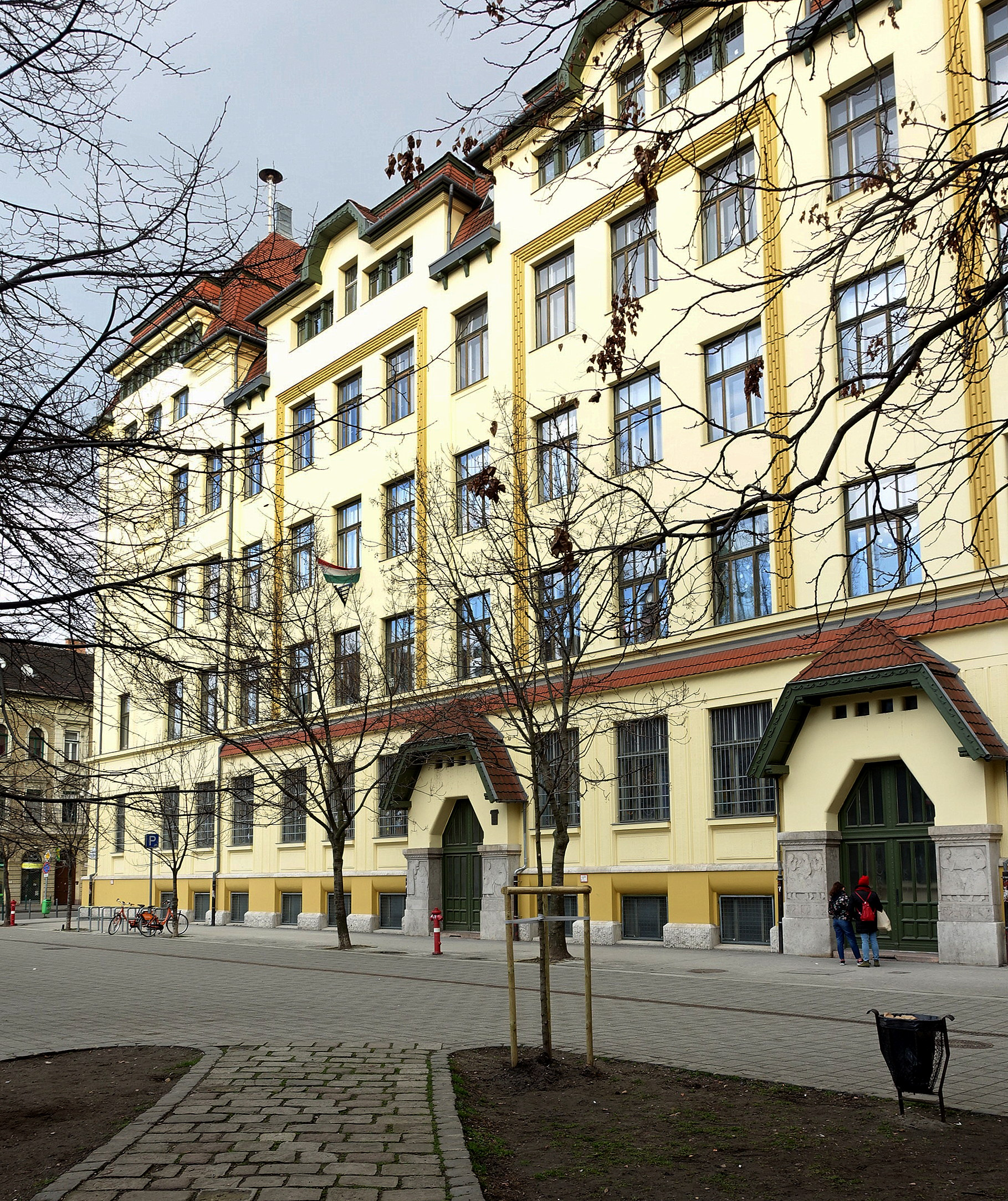

Location
- Horváth Mihály tér 8 Budapest 1082; Hungary; 47.489115°N 19.07615°E

Information
- Established: 1912; 114 years ago
- Website: https://fazekas.hu/

The Fazekas Mihály Gymnasium (lit. 'Mihály Fazekas High School'; Hungarian: Fazekas Mihály Gimnázium, full official name: Budapesti Fazekas Mihály Gyakorló Általános Iskola és Gimnázium; also known among alumni as simply Fazekas (potter) or even Fazék (pot)) is a high school in Budapest, Hungary.

== History ==
=== Early years ===
The school's history reaches back to 1911 when the mayor of Budapest opened an elementary school at the site to meet the increasing demand for education in the expanding city. A year later, the building became temporary home to the Pedagogical Seminary, whose purpose was to provide guidance and later supervision for all teachers and schools in the city. The elementary school thus became a training school where teachers could become acquainted with the latest pedagogical techniques. The seminars given at the school became enormously popular between the two World Wars; Zsigmond Móricz often praised them in Nyugat.

The beginnings of the high school are to be found in the St. Benedictus High School run by Benedictine monks from 1923 at a site very close to the present location. After the Communist takeover the school was nationalised and continued under the present name. The proximity of the Pedagogical Seminary allowed for close and deepening cooperation. In 1960 the high school was transformed into a training high school to extend the model (already successful for elementary schools) to the entire 12 years of education. The high school moved to the present building and the full, official name became Fazekas Mihály Fővárosi Gyakorló Általános Iskola és Gimnázium.

The building was severely damaged both in World War II and again in the 1956 revolution.

=== Rise of an elite school ===
Fazekas's prestigious reputation is linked to special mathematics classes which were started in 1962, when Imre Rábai demonstrated his skillfulness, who went on to achieve world fame for the school in the subject. Ever since, numerous Fazekas alumni have achieved success on the world stage, particularly in mathematics and the natural sciences.

The eight-strong Hungarian team participating in the 1966 International Mathematical Olympiad consisted solely of Fazekas students and three of them (László Lovász, József Pelikán and Lajos Pósa) returned with gold medals. This and other results in both national and international competitions have since ranked the school top among its peers in Hungary to this day. The International Science Olympiad teams for Hungary regularly include several Fazekas students.

== Notable alumni ==
- Babai, László - mathematician, Gödel Prize winner
- Baranyai, Zsolt - mathemathican, Baranyai's theorem, musician, Bakfark Consort
- Elekes, György, mathematician
- Csörnyei, Marianna - mathematician, won a 2002 Whitehead Prize and a Royal Society Wolfson Research Merit Award that same year
- Draskovics, Tibor - jurist, politician, Minister of Justice and Law Enforcement (approx.: Attorney General).
- Hiller, István - politician. Former Socialist party leader, former minister of education
- Kovács, Ákos - singer, composer
- Laczkovich, Miklós - mathematician
- Lovász, László - mathematician, winner of the Wolf Prize in Mathematics and of 3 gold medals at the IMOs
- Magyar, Bálint - politician, former Minister of Education
- Pálfy, Péter Pál - mathematician, former director of the Alfréd Rényi Institute of Mathematics of the Hungarian Academy of Sciences
- Pósa, Lajos - mathematician, IMO winner
- Pintz, János - mathematician
- Ruzsa, Imre Z. - mathematician
- Thürmer, Gyula - Communist party leader
