= Annemarie Sorescu-Marinković =

Linguist and anthropologist at the Institute for Balkan Studies, Belgrade

- Annemarie Sorescu
- Education: University of Timișoara; Babeș-Bolyai University
- Known for: Sociolinguistics of Romance-speaking communities in the Balkans; Boyash studies, One of the most published Vlach/Romanian author and researcher
- Awards: Gypsy Lore Society Young Scholars' Prize in Romani Studies (2011)
- Scientific career
- Fields: Sociolinguistics, linguistic anthropology, folkloristics, Romance studies, migration studies
- Workplaces: Institute for Balkan Studies, Serbian Academy of Sciences and Arts

Annemarie Sorescu-Marinković is a linguist and anthropologist who is principal research fellow at the Institute for Balkan Studies of the Serbian Academy of Sciences and Arts in Belgrade. Her research concerns the language, folklore and migration of Romance-speaking communities in the Balkans, in particular the Vlachs of eastern Serbia, the Boyash, and the Megleno-Romanians.

With Monica Huțanu she is the author of The Vlachs of Eastern Serbia: Language and Society (2023), described by its publisher as the first in-depth sociolinguistic analysis of that community and its language. She co-edited The Romance-Speaking Balkans: Language and the Politics of Identity (Brill, 2021) and Boyash Studies: Researching "Our People" (Frank & Timme, 2021), the latter credited in the literature with helping to constitute Boyash studies as a distinct interdisciplinary subfield.

== Education ==
Sorescu-Marinković holds bachelor's and master's degrees from the Faculty of Letters, History, Philosophy and Theology of the University of Timișoara, and a doctorate in philology from Babeș-Bolyai University in Cluj-Napoca, awarded in 2009 for work on the anthropology of the Vlachs of north-eastern Serbia. (Note: The Institute for Balkan Studies and the Swedish Journal of Romanian Studies give 2009 as the year of the doctorate; Brill's contributor note gives 2010.)

== Career ==
She worked as a teaching assistant in the Department of Romanian Language and Literature at the Faculty of Philology of the University of Belgrade, and has been employed at the Institute for Balkan Studies of the Serbian Academy of Sciences and Arts since 2006, where she holds the rank of principal research fellow. Her earlier publications identify her as senior research associate at the same institute.

She has led several externally funded research projects:

- Vulnerable Languages and Linguistic Varieties in Serbia (VLingS), 2022 2025, funded by the Science Fund of the Republic of Serbia under its IDEAS programme
- Semiotic Landscapes of Multilingual Border Regions, 2022 2023, a bilateral project with the University of Jena funded by the Serbian ministry of education and the German Academic Exchange Service
- Language Landscape of the Cultural Area of Banat, 2020 2021, also with Jena and the German Academic Exchange Service
- a joint project of the Serbian Academy of Sciences and Arts and the Romanian Academy on Romanian Serbian relations in the 20th century, 2025 2027

In 2015 2016 she held a fellowship of the fourth generation of the ERSTE Foundation Fellowship for Social Research, in the course of which she organised the photographic exhibition Romanian Diaspora in Serbia at the ŠTAB Gallery in Belgrade.

== Research ==
=== Vlachs of eastern Serbia ===
Sorescu-Marinković's earliest fieldwork, from the early 2000s, concerned the funeral laments, mythological narratives and oral literature of the Vlachs of north-eastern Serbia. Her doctoral research on Vlach mythological beings was published in Romanian as Românii din Timoc astăzi. Ființe mitologice (2012).

From the 2010s her work on the community, much of it with Monica Huțanu, shifted towards sociolinguistics: the writing systems proposed for the vernacular and their ideological correlates, the recent standardisation of Vlach, its use online, its presence in the linguistic landscape of eastern Serbia, and the long-standing statistical asymmetry between declared Vlach ethnicity and declared Vlach mother tongue in Serbian censuses. This work distinguishes between "reintegrationist" and "independentist" positions within the community: respectively those who regard the vernacular as a variety of Romanian and those who regard it as a separate language, and analyses the orthographies associated with each.

The resulting monograph, The Vlachs of Eastern Serbia: Language and Society, appeared in 2023 in the Vanishing Languages and Cultural Heritage series of the Austrian Academy of Sciences Press.

=== Boyash studies ===
Sorescu-Marinković has published extensively on the Boyash (also Bayash or Rudari), a Romanian-speaking population dispersed across the Balkans and central Europe and generally regarded by surrounding majority populations as Roma. Her work covers their vernaculars in Baranja and Međimurje in Croatia, lexicographic strategies for the Boyash varieties of Serbia, mother-tongue education, identity construction, and the gurban ritual among Boyash labour migrants in Paris.

Her paper reconsidering the "Gypsy court" among the Boyash argued against the assumption that all groups possessing the institution speak Romani, drawing on fieldwork in Međimurje and Bačka; it won the Gypsy Lore Society's Young Scholars' Prize and was published in Romani Studies in 2013. The 2021 volume Boyash Studies: Researching "Our People", which she co-edited with Thede Kahl and Biljana Sikimić, has been cited in Romani Studies as marking the emergence of Boyash studies as a subfield in its own right.

=== Megleno-Romanians and Romanian communities in Serbia ===
With Mircea Măran she has published on the Megleno-Romanians of Serbia, describing the community as close to extinction, and edited a thematic issue of Memoria Ethnologica devoted to them. She has also written on the Romanians of Vojvodina and on contemporary Romanian labour migration to Serbia, including a study of Romanian women who married into villages of eastern Serbia.

=== Yugoslav television in socialist Romania ===
A separate strand of her research concerns media and everyday life on the Romanian side of the Yugoslav Romanian border, where Yugoslav television could be received during the Ceaușescu period. She has published on the acquisition of Serbian in communist Romania, on the personality cult of Elena Ceaușescu and Romanian state television, and on the reception of foreign broadcasting as a form of contact with an idealised elsewhere. The strand is collected in her 2018 book Са друге стране границе ("From the Other Side of the Border").

=== Endangered languages ===
She has co-authored a critical survey of methodologies for assessing linguistic vulnerability and endangerment in Serbia, and studies of what speakers of vulnerable varieties themselves understand by "mother tongue". She is co-editor of the volume Vulnerable and Endangered Languages in Europe (2025). Her interdisciplinary work extends to a study, published in Biological Conservation, combining botany, ecology, remote sensing, history and ethnology in two villages of the Serbian Carpathians.

== Editorial and professional roles ==
Sorescu-Marinković sits on the editorial board of Balcanica, the annual of the Institute for Balkan Studies, and on the international editorial board of Hiperboreea, the journal of the Balkan History Association, of whose scientific committee she is a member. She is on the advisory board of Balcanica Posnaniensia. Acta et studia, and reviews for Romani Studies, Folkloristika, the Swedish Journal of Romanian Studies and Balcanica Posnaniensia. She is a member of the Gypsy Lore Society, the Association for the Study of Nationalities and the Association for Slavic, East European, and Eurasian Studies.

== Awards ==
- Gypsy Lore Society Young Scholars' Prize in Romani Studies, 2011, for "The Gypsy Court of the Bayash: Revising Typology"

== Selected publications ==
Books

- with Monica Huțanu. The Vlachs of Eastern Serbia: Language and Society. Vienna: Austrian Academy of Sciences Press, 2023. ISBN 978-3-7001-9208-4.
- Са друге стране границе. Југословенска телевизија и друге успомене из свакодневног живота Румуна у Банату. Timișoara: Savez Srba u Rumuniji, 2018.
- with Daniel Cain, Armand Goșu and Cornel Sigmirean. Românii de lângă noi. Bucharest: Ministry of Foreign Affairs, 2013.
- Românii din Timoc astăzi. Ființe mitologice. Cluj-Napoca: Argonaut, 2012.

Edited volumes

- with Mina Ćorković and Mirjana Mirić (eds). Vulnerable and Endangered Languages in Europe. Belgrade: Institute for Balkan Studies SASA, 2025.
- with Mihai Dragnea, Thede Kahl, Blagovest Njagulov, Donald L. Dyer and Angelo Costanzo (eds). The Romance-Speaking Balkans: Language and the Politics of Identity. Leiden: Brill, 2021.
- with Thede Kahl and Biljana Sikimić (eds). Boyash Studies: Researching "Our People". Berlin: Frank & Timme, 2021.
- (ed.) Caiete de teren. Torac metodologia cercetării de teren. Novi Sad and Pančevo, 2006.

Selected articles

- "The Vlach Funeral Laments Tradition Revisited". Balcanica XXXV (2005),
- "Serbian Language Acquisition in Communist Romania". Balcanica XLI (2010),
- "Strategies for creating an explanatory Bayash dictionary in Serbia". Revue Roumaine de Linguistique LVI/1 (2011),
- "Vorbarĭ Rumîńesk: The Vlach On-line Dictionary". Philologica Jassyensia VIII/1 (2012),
- "The Court of the Bayash: Revising a Theory". Romani Studies 23/1 (2013),
- "Elena Ceaușescu's personality cult and Romanian state television". Balcanica XLVIII (2017),
- with Monica Huțanu. "Writing Systems and Linguistic Identity of the Vlach Community of Eastern Serbia". Diacronia 7 (2018),
- with Mirjana Mirić and Svetlana Ćirković. "Assessing linguistic vulnerability and endangerment in Serbia". Balcanica LI (2020),
- "For a Corpus of Vlach Romanian Charms. Current Situation and Perspectives". Philologica Jassyensia XVI/1 (2020)
- "What's in a Vlach name? Patronyms, double naming and ethnic identity of the Vlachs of Eastern Serbia". Onomastica LXVII (2023)
