= 2009 European Youth Olympic Festival =

2009 European Youth Olympic Festival may refer to:

- 2009 European Youth Summer Olympic Festival
- 2009 European Youth Olympic Winter Festival
