= 2009 European Youth Olympic Winter Festival =

2009 edition of the European Youth Olympic Winter Festival

- Host city: 5 cities in Silesia
- Country: Poland
- Nations: 46
- Athletes: 1,615
- Sport: 9
- Events: 31
- Opening: 15 February 2009
- Closing: 20 February 2009
- Opened by: Lech Kaczyński
- Athlete's Oath: Magdalena Kozielska
- Judge's Oath: Marek Tucznio
- Torch lighter: Piotr Fijas
- Main venue: Skalite Ski Jumping Stadium

Summer

Winter

The 2009 European Youth Olympic Winter Festival was held between 15 and 20 February 2009 in Poland. The host cities are 5 cities in the Silesian province of Poland, namely Bielsko-Biała, Cieszyn, Szczyrk, Tychy, and Wisła.

== Sports ==
2009 European Youth Olympic Winter Festival Sports Programme
- Alpine skiing (4)
- Biathlon (5)
- Cross-country skiing (7)
- Curling (2)
- Figure skating (3)
- Ice hockey (1)
- Nordic combined (3)
- Ski jumping (2)
- Snowboarding (4)

== Venues ==
Venues used:

Venue	Location	Sports
Bielsko-Biała curling arena	Bielsko-Biała	Curling
Cieszyn ice rink	Cieszyn	Figure skating
Skalite jumping hill	Szczyrk	Ski jumping, Nordic combined
FIS Skrzyczne	Szczyrk	Alpine skiing
FIS Golgota	Szczyrk	Snowboard - Parallel slalom
Juliany snowcross track	Szczyrk	Snowboard
Tychy Winter Stadium	Tychy	Ice hockey
Kubalonka Cross-country and Biathlon Stadium	Wisła	Biathlon, Cross country skiing, Nordic combined

== Schedule ==
The competition schedule for the 2009 European Youth Olympic Winter Festival is as follows:

OC	Opening ceremony	1	Event finals	CC	Closing ceremony	●	Event competitions

February	15 Sun	16 Mon	17 Tue	18 Wed	19 Thu	20 Fri	Events
Ceremonies	OC					CC	
Alpine skiing		1	1			2	4
Biathlon			2	2		1	5
Cross-country skiing			2	2	2	1	7
Curling		●	●	●	●	2	2
Figure skating		●	2	1			3
Ice hockey		●	●	●	●	1	1
Nordic combined		1		1		1	3
Ski jumping			1		1		2
Snowboarding				2		2	4
Total events		2	8	8	3	10	31
Cumulative total		2	10	18	21	31	
February	15 Sun	16 Mon	17 Tue	18 Wed	19 Thu	20 Fri	Events

== Medal table ==
* Host nation (Poland)

Rank	Nation	Gold	Silver	Bronze	Total
1	Russia (RUS)	5	2	4	11
2	Germany (GER)	4	7	4	15
3	Austria (AUT)	4	4	1	9
4	Finland (FIN)	4	0	2	6
5	Norway (NOR)	3	4	6	13
6	Switzerland (SUI)	3	3	5	11
7	Sweden (SWE)	2	3	1	6
8	Slovenia (SLO)	2	0	2	4
9	Poland (POL)*	1	2	1	4
10	France (FRA)	1	1	2	4
11	Great Britain (GBR)	1	1	0	2
12	Estonia (EST)	1	0	0	1
13	Ukraine (UKR)	0	2	0	2
14	Czech Republic (CZE)	0	1	1	2
15	Bulgaria (BUL)	0	1	0	1
16	Denmark (DEN)	0	0	1	1
16	Latvia (LAT)	0	0	1	1
Totals (17 entries)		31	31	31	93
