= Nordic combined at the 2009 European Youth Olympic Winter Festival =

- Venue: Skalite jumping hill, Szczyrk; Kubalonka Cross-country and Biathlon Stadium , Wisla
- Date: 16–20 February

Nordic combined at the 2009 European Youth Olympic Winter Festival was held from 16 to 20 February 2009. It was held in Szczyrk and Wisla, Poland.

== Results ==
=== Medal table ===
Rank	Nation	Gold	Silver	Bronze	Total
1	Germany (GER)	2	0	1	3
2	Poland (POL)	1	2	1	4
3	Austria (AUT)	0	1	0	1
4	Slovenia (SLO)	0	0	1	1
Totals (4 entries)		3	3	3	9

=== Medalists ===
Event	Gold	Silver	Bronze
Boys Sprint	Manuel Faißt; Germany	Pawel Slowiok; Poland	Tobias Simon; Germany
Boys Gundersen	Pawel Slowiok; Poland	Mario Seidl; Austria	Adam Cieslar; Poland
Boys Team 3x5 km	Team Germany; Germany	Team Poland; Poland	Team Slovenia; Slovenia
