= Ski jumping at the 2009 European Youth Olympic Winter Festival =

- Venue: Skalite jumping hill, Szczyrk
- Date: 17–19 February

Ski jumping at the 2009 European Youth Olympic Winter Festival was held from 17 to 19 February 2009. It was held in Szczyrk, Poland.

== Results ==
=== Medal table ===
Rank	Nation	Gold	Silver	Bronze	Total
1	Slovenia (SLO)	2	0	0	2
2	Austria (AUT)	0	1	0	1
2	Bulgaria (BUL)	0	1	0	1
4	Switzerland (SUI)	0	0	2	2
Totals (4 entries)		2	2	2	6

=== Medalists ===
Event	Gold	Silver	Bronze
Boys	Peter Prevc; Slovenia	Vladimir Zografski; Bulgaria	Adrian Schuler; Switzerland
Boys Team	Team Slovenia; Slovenia	Team Austria; Austria	Team Switzerland; Switzerland
