= Baranya =

Baranya or Baranja may refer to:

- Baranya (region) or Baranja, a region in Hungary and Croatia
- Baranya County, a county in modern Hungary
- Baranya County (former), a county in the historic Kingdom of Hungary
- Baranya, Hungarian name of Baranyntsi village in Zakarpattia Oblast, Ukraine
- Baranja, Nepal, a village in Nepal

== See also ==
- Baranyai, a surname
- Baranjars, a group of medieval Turkic tribes
- Barania Góra, mountain in southern Poland
