= Snowboarding at the 2009 European Youth Olympic Winter Festival =

- Venue: FIS Golgota, Szczyrk; Juliany snowcross track, Szczyrk
- Date: 18–20 February

Snowboarding at the 2009 European Youth Olympic Winter Festival was held from 18 to 20 February 2009. It was held in Szczyrk, Poland.

== Results ==
=== Medal table ===
Rank	Nation	Gold	Silver	Bronze	Total
1	Austria (AUT)	2	2	1	5
2	Switzerland (SUI)	1	0	2	3
3	Russia (RUS)	1	0	0	1
4	Germany (GER)	0	2	0	2
5	France (FRA)	0	0	1	1
Totals (5 entries)		4	4	4	12

=== Medalists ===
Event	Gold	Silver	Bronze
Boys SBX	Nikita Kovalenko; Russia	Martin Noerl; Germany	Max Widnig; Austria
Girls SBX	Sabine Schoeffmann; Austria	Julia Hennecke; Germany	Maeva Martin; France
Boys parallel slalom	Julian Lueftner; Austria	Max Widnig; Austria	Silvan Flepp; Switzerland
Girls parallel slalom	Julie Zogg; Switzerland	Sabine Schoeffmann; Austria	Ladina Jenny; Switzerland
