= Skrzyczne =

Mountain in Poland

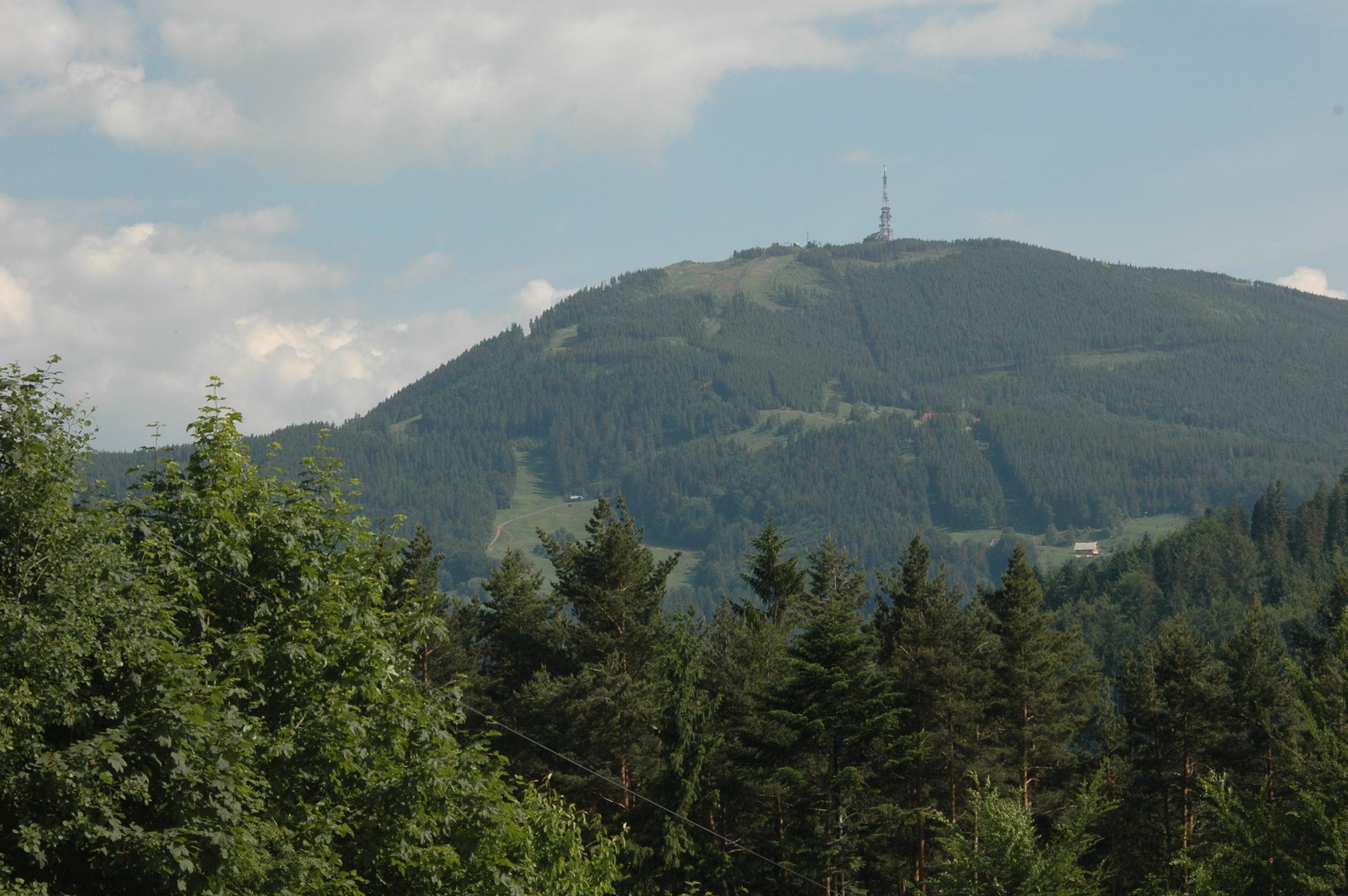
- The top of Skrzyczne, June 2005

Highest point
- Elevation: 1,257 m (4,124 ft)
- Prominence: 585 m (1,919 ft)
- Listing: Mountains of Poland
- Coordinates: 49°41′04″N 19°01′48″E

Geography
- Location within Poland Location within Silesian Voivodeship
- Location: Silesian Voivodeship, Poland
- Parent range: Silesian Beskids

Skrzyczne is a mountain in southern Poland, in the Silesian Voivodeship, close to the town of Szczyrk. It is the highest mountain of the Silesian Beskids and the fifth most topographically prominent peak in Poland. (Note: Some sources list Skrzyczne as Poland's sixth biggest peak by prominence. Those sources include the Pilsko massif, whose highest peak is in Slovakia, on the list (and rank it ahead of Skrzyczne in prominence).)

Skrzyczne is one of the peaks which make up the Crown of Polish Mountains, a list of the highest points in each of Poland's 28 mountain ranges. The peak can be reached by hiking paths, and there is also a gondola lift which starts in Szczyrk and comes up to around 1,000 metres (3,300 ft) above sea level. The slopes of the mountain are also known for the many blueberries which grow on them and which are frequently collected by hikers and other visitors.

A mountain hut, PTTK Skrzyczne, is located very close to the peak of the mountain. The first hut, built in 1933, was destroyed in a fire. A second hut was built in the late 1930s, and stands to this day. There is likewise a tall (87 metres (285 ft)) radio and television tower atop Skrzyczne, which makes it easy to recognise the peak from afar.

In addition to multiple hiking trails, the Skrzyczne area also hosts a ski resort with several pistes, as well as mountain biking trails. Several trail races also cross the peak, most notably Zamieć, a 24-hour race which takes place in the winter.

Legend has it that Skrzyczne takes its name from the croaking of frogs (in Polish: skrzyczenie), which supposedly inhabited the (now nonexistent) ponds near the peak.

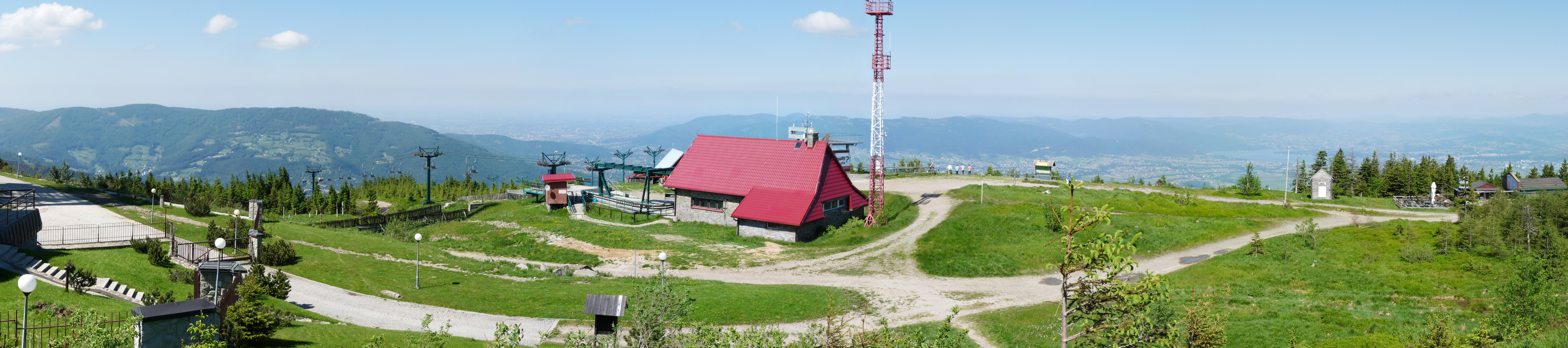
Panorama taken near the peak of Skrzyczne
