= Biathlon at the 2009 European Youth Olympic Winter Festival =

- Venue: Kubalonka Cross-country and Biathlon Stadium, Wisla
- Date: 17–20 February

Biathlon at the 2009 European Youth Olympic Winter Festival was held from 17 to 20 February 2009. It was held in Wisla, Poland.

== Results ==
=== Medal table ===
Rank	Nation	Gold	Silver	Bronze	Total
1	Germany (GER)	2	2	1	5
2	Finland (FIN)	2	0	0	2
3	Sweden (SWE)	1	0	0	1
4	Norway (NOR)	0	1	1	2
4	Russia (RUS)	0	1	1	2
4	Switzerland (SUI)	0	1	1	2
7	France (FRA)	0	0	1	1
Totals (7 entries)		5	5	5	15

=== Medalists ===
Event	Gold	Silver	Bronze
Boys 10 km	Mikko Repo; Finland	Marius Hol; Norway	Florent Claude; France
Girls 7,5 km	Ingela Andersson; Sweden	Christina Maierhofer; Germany	Irene Cadurisch; Switzerland
Boys 7,5 km sprint	Mikko Repo; Finland	Steffen Bartscher; Germany	Ilia Popov; Russia
Girls 6 km sprint	Christina Maierhofer; Germany	Irene Cadurisch; Switzerland	Birgit Riesle; Germany
Mixed relay 2x6 km, 2x7,5 km	Germany; Christina Maierhofer; Jennifer Horn; Johannes Kühn; Steffen Bartscher	Russia; Olga Galich; Anastasia Mikhaylova; Iakov Nekrasov; Ivan Pichuzhkin	Norway; Mari Sandeggen; Karoline Birkeland; Vetle Sjåstad Christiansen; Marius Hol
