= Cross-country skiing at the 2009 European Youth Olympic Winter Festival =

Cross country skiing at the 2009 European Youth Olympic Winter Festival
- Venue: Kubalonka Cross-country and Biathlon Stadium, Wisla
- Date: 17–20 February

Cross-country skiing at the 2009 European Youth Olympic Winter Festival was held from 17 to 20 February 2009. It was held in Wisla, Poland.

== Results ==
=== Medal table ===
2009 European Youth Olympic Festival
Rank	Nation	Gold	Silver	Bronze	Total
1	Norway (NOR)	4	2	3	9
2	Finland (FIN)	2	0	1	3
3	Russia (RUS)	1	2	3	6
4	Germany (GER)	0	2	0	2
5	Czech Republic (CZE)	0	1	0	1
Totals (5 entries)		7	7	7	21

=== Medalists ===
Event	Gold	Silver	Bronze
Boys 7,5 km classic	Skar Sindre Bjornestad; Norway	Didrik Tonseth; Norway	Perttu Hyvärinen; Finland
Girls 5 km classic	Marjaana Pitkänen; Finland	Lucia Anger; Germany	Ragnhild Haga; Norway
Boys 10 km free	Perttu Hyvärinen; Finland	Jakub Gräf; Czech Republic	Didrik Tonseth; Norway
Girls 7,5 km free	Markset Anne-Tine Bendixen; Norway	Ragnhild Haga; Norway	Svetlana Kokovina; Russia
Boys Sprint 1,2 km	Skar Sindre Bjornestad; Norway	Gleb Retivykh; Russia	Fedor Stroitelev; Russia
Girls Sprint 1,2 km	Darya Godovanichenko; Russia	Inna Smirnova; Russia	Ragnhild Haga; Norway
Mixed relay 4x5 km free	Team Norway; Norway	Team Germany; Germany	Team Russia; Russia
