= Silesian Beskids Landscape Park =

Protected area in Poland

Coordinates: 49°43′N 18°54′E

- Park Krajobrazowy Beskidu Śląskiego
- IUCN category V (protected landscape/seascape)
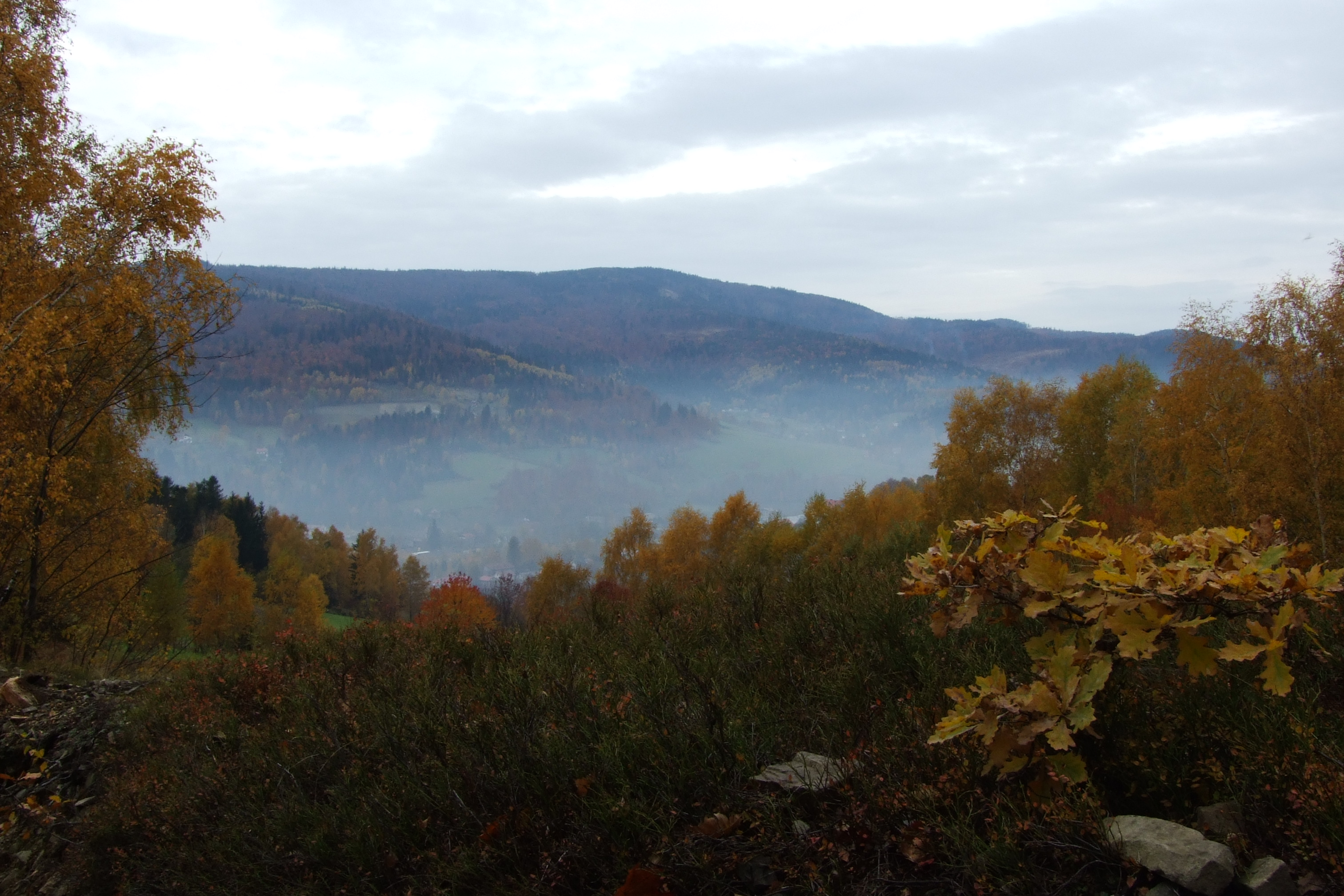
- Interactive map of Silesian Beskids Landscape Park
- Location: south Poland
- Area: 386.2 km^{2} (149.1 sq mi)
- Established: 1998

Silesian Beskids Landscape Park (Polish: Park Krajobrazowy Beskidu Śląskiego) is a protected area (Landscape Park) in southern Poland, established in 1998, covering an area of 386.2 square kilometres (149.1 sq mi) in the Silesian Beskids mountain range. Administratively the Park is contained within Silesian Voivodeship.
