= Lajos Pósa (mathematician) =

Hungarian mathematician

Lajos Pósa (born 9 December 1947 in Budapest) is a Hungarian mathematician working in the topic of combinatorics, and one of the most prominent mathematics educators of Hungary, best known for his mathematics camps for gifted students. He is a winner of the Széchenyi Prize. Paul Erdős's favorite "child", he discovered theorems at the age of 13. Since 2002, he has worked at the Rényi Institute of the Hungarian Academy of Sciences; earlier he was at the Eötvös Loránd University, at the Departments of Mathematical Analysis, Computer Science.

== Biography ==
He was born in Budapest, Hungary on 9 December 1947. His father was a chemist, his mother a mathematics teacher. He was a child prodigy. While still in elementary school, the educator Rózsa Péter, friend of his mother introduced him to Paul Erdős, who invited him for lunch in a restaurant, and bombarded him with mathematical questions. Pósa finished the problems sooner than his soup, which impressed Erdős, who himself had been a child prodigy, and who supported young talents with much care and competence. That is how Pósa’s first paper was born, co-authored with Erdős (hence his Erdős number is 1).

He went to the first special mathematics class of the country at Fazekas Mihály Secondary School from 1962 to 1966, where his classmates included Miklós Laczkovich, László Lovász, József Pelikán, Zsolt Baranyai, István Berkes, Katalin Vesztergombi, Péter Major. He won the first prize on the International Mathematical Olympiad in 1966 (Bulgaria) and second prize in 1965 (Germany).

He started his Mathematics studies at ELTE University in 1966, and graduated in 1971. From 1971 to 1982 he worked at the Department of Mathematical Analysis at ELTE University, and he obtained a doctorate in 1983 with his dissertation about Hamiltonian circuits of random graphs. From 1984 to 2002 he worked at the Department of Computer Science at ELTE University, and since 2002 he has been a member of the Rényi Mathematical Institute.

Despite his significant results in mathematical research, he stopped research and devoted himself fully to Mathematics Education. Erdős, who preferred him among all his protégés, expressed his regret that Pósa had stopped research with the typical Erdős style phrase "Pósa is dead."

== Mathematics education ==
He started teaching mathematics very early. He tutored his secondary school classmates, and during his first year at university he started teaching extracurricular courses at his former secondary school. His students at that time included: László Babai, György Elekes, Péter Komjáth, Imre Z. Ruzsa.

At the beginning of the 1970s he got involved with the school reform movement called complex teaching of mathematics led by Tamás Varga. Pósa worked on the reform of secondary mathematics teaching, while he taught at Radnóti Miklós Secondary School from 1976 to 1980. From 1982 to 1989 he was a member of the Research Group on Mathematics Education led by János Surányi. From 1982 to 1991 he had two experimental classes at Eötvös József Secondary School. His teaching materials written at that time were tested in several classes, and based on these he and colleagues have written a textbook series for the four years of secondary school.

Nevertheless, Pósa is best known for finding and teaching gifted students. Since 1988 he has been organizing his own week-end maths camps. There are several groups of 20-35 students, and each group has two or three camps a year. In a camp, students mostly work in groups of 2-4, but there are also plenary sessions where they discuss solutions, and sum up important thoughts. Students work on problems carefully built on each other. There are several topics running parallelly, and one topic spans several camps. The emphasis is on thinking, proving, and the connection between seemingly distant ideas. The camps are also an important scene of teacher training, as prospective teachers observe and help in the camps.

== Mathematical research ==
- He gave sufficient conditions for the existence of Hamiltonian circuit.
- He proved that a random graph on n vertices with cn log n edges almost surely contains a Hamiltonian circuit, thus affirming a conjecture of Erdős and Rényi (also proved by A. D. Korshunov). The result was later improved by Komlós and Szemerédi.
- With Erdős he proved the Erdős–Pósa theorem.

== Prizes, awards ==
- Prize for Children Support („Gyermekekért” díj), 1989
- Beke Manó Prize I. degree by Bolyai János Mathematical Society, 1994
- Officer’s Cross Order of Merit of the Republic of Hungary, 1998
- Charles Simonyi Scholarship, 2000
- MOL prize for Gifted Education (“Tehetséggondozásért” díj), 2008
- Széchenyi Prize, 2011

== Publications ==
- Pósa Lajos: A prímszámok egy tulajdonságáról, Matematikai Lapok, 11 (1960), 124-128.
- P. Erdős, L. Pósa: On the maximal number of disjoint circuits of a graph, Publ. Math. Debrecen, 9 (1962), 3-13.
- L. Pósa: A theorem concerning Hamilton lines, MTA Mat. Kut. Int. Közl. 7 (1962), 225-226.
- L. Pósa: On the circuits of finite graphs, MTA Mat. Kut. Int. Közl. 8 (1964), 355-361.
- P. Erdős, L. Pósa: On independent circuits contained in a graph, Can. J. Math. 17 (1965), 347-352.
- P. Erdős, A. W. Goodman, L. Pósa: The representation of a graph by set intersection, Can. J. Math. 18 (1966), 106-112.
- P. Erdős, A. Hajnal, L. Pósa: Strong embeddings of graphs into colored graphs, Infinite and finite sets (Colloq. Keszthely 1973; dedicated to P. Erdős on his 60th birthday), Vol. I. Colloq. Math. Soc. J. Bolyai, Vol. 10, North Holland, Amsterdam, 1975, 585-595.
- L. Pósa: Hamiltonian circuits in random graphs, Discrete Mathematics, 14 (1976), 359-364.
- Pósa Lajos: Véletlen gráfok Hamilton körei, egyetemi doktori értekezés, Budapest, 1982.
- Pósa Lajos: Beszélgetés az új felvételi rendszer tervéről, Köznevelés, XXXV (1979) (20), 7-8.
- Pósa Lajos: Variációk egy témára, Matematika-tanárképzés – matematikatanár-továbbképzés, 3 (1995), 41-59.

== Textbooks ==
- Pósa Lajos: Analízis I. Differenciálszámítás, 11. o., Műszaki Könyvkiadó Kft., 2000
- Pósa Lajos: Analízis I. Differenciálszámítás. Tanári útmutató, 11. o., Műszaki Könyvkiadó Kft., 2000
- Pósa Lajos: Analízis II. - Integrálszámítás, Műszaki Könyvkiadó Kft.
- Pósa Lajos: Analízis II. Integrálszámítás (tanári útmutató), Műszaki Könyvkiadó Kft.
- Pósa Lajos: Összefoglalás. Algebra. Megoldások, Műszaki Könyvkiadó Kft., 1999
- Pósa Lajos: Összefoglalás. Algebra, függvények, Műszaki Könyvkiadó Kft., 1999
- Pósa Lajos: Sorozatok 11.-12. o. Műszaki Könyvkiadó Kft., 1998
- Pósa Lajos: Sorozatok. Tanári útmutató 11.-12. o., Műszaki Könyvkiadó Kft., 1998
- Pósa Lajos: Vegyes feladatok 1. 7.-9. o., Műszaki Könyvkiadó Kft., 1998
- Pósa Lajos: Vegyes feladatok 1. Tanári útmutató 9. o., Műszaki Könyvkiadó Kft., 1998
- Pósa Lajos: Hatványozás kiterjesztése és logaritmus-feladatsorok, Műszaki Könyvkiadó Kft.
- Pósa Lajos: Hatványozás kiterjesztése és logaritmus-megoldások, végeredmények, Műszaki Könyvkiadó Kft.
- Pósa Lajos: Vegyes feladatok tanári útmutató 1. osztály (2. kiadás, Műszaki Könyvkiadó, Budapest, 1999.)
- Pósa Lajos: Vegyes feladatok 2. - Tanári útmutató (Műszaki Könyvkiadó, Budapest, 2000.)
- Pósa Lajos: Vektorok és koordinátageometria - Feladatsorok (Műszaki Könyvkiadó, Budapest)
- Pósa Lajos: Vektorok és koordinátageometria - Megoldások, végeredmények (Műszaki Könyvkiadó, Budapest)
- Pósa Lajos: Vektorok és koordináta geometria - Tanári útmutató (Műszaki Könyvkiadó, Budapest, 2000.)
- Pósa Lajos: Összefoglalás - Matematika, elmélet, feladatok (Műszaki Könyvkiadó, Budapest)
- Pósa Lajos: Összefoglalás - Matematika, megoldások (Műszaki Könyvkiadó, Budapest)
- Pósa Lajos - Halmos Mária - Gábos Adél: Kombinatorika (Műszaki Könyvkiadó, Budapest, 1998.)
- Gábos Adél - Halmos Mária - Pósa Lajos: Kombinatorika - Tanári útmutató (Műszaki Könyvkiadó, Budapest, 2000.)

== See also ==
- Pósa theorem (1962).
- Erdős–Pósa theorem (1965).
