= Ice hockey at the 2009 European Youth Olympic Winter Festival =

2009 European Youth Olympic Winter Festival – Ice hockey

Tournament details
- Host country: Poland
- Venue(s): 1 (in 1 host city)
- Dates: 16–20 February 2009

Final positions
- Champions: Russia
- Runner-up: Switzerland
- Third place: Finland

Ice hockey at the 2009 European Youth Olympic Winter Festival was a men's ice hockey tournament played during the Silesia 2009 edition of the European Youth Olympic Festival (EYOF). It was held at the Tychy Winter Stadium in Tychy, Poland from 16 to 20 February 2009.

== Results ==
=== Medal table ===
Rank	Nation	Gold	Silver	Bronze	Total
1	Russia (RUS)	1	0	0	1
2	Switzerland (SUI)	0	1	0	1
3	Finland (FIN)	0	0	1	1
Totals (3 entries)		1	1	1	3

Source: EYOF 2011

=== Medalists ===
Event	Gold	Silver	Bronze
Boys Team	Team Russia; Russia	Team Switzerland; Switzerland	Team Finland; Finland
