= Voting matters =

- Discipline: Political science
- Language: English
- Edited by: Brian Wichmann (1994–2010), Nicolaus Tideman (2010–)

Publication details
- History: 1994-present
- Publisher: McDougall Trust (United Kingdom)
- Open access: Yes

Standard abbreviations
- ISO 4: Voting matters

Indexing
- ISSN: 1745-6231
- OCLC no.: 498736040

Links
- Journal homepage; Online archive

Voting matters was a peer-reviewed academic journal whose purpose is "To advance the understanding of preferential voting systems". Originally published by the Electoral Reform Society (1994–2003), Voting matters then became a publication of the McDougall Trust until April, 2013. The journal's founding editor-in-chief (1994–2010) was British mathematician and computer scientist Brian Wichmann, followed by Nicolaus Tideman.

Voting matters papers dealt with the study of various electoral systems. The journal has also republished several seminal papers on STV by Thomas Hare, Henry Richmond Droop, and Brian Meek.
