= Pósa's theorem =

Sufficient condition for a Hamiltonian cycle in a graph, based on its vertex's degrees

Pósa's theorem, in graph theory, is a sufficient condition for the existence of a Hamiltonian cycle based on the degrees of the vertices in an undirected graph. It implies two other degree-based sufficient conditions, Dirac's theorem on Hamiltonian cycles and Ore's theorem. Unlike those conditions, it can be applied to graphs with a small number of low-degree vertices. It is named after Lajos Pósa, a protégé of Paul Erdős born in 1947, who discovered this theorem in 1962.

The Pósa condition for a finite undirected graph $G$ having $n$ vertices requires that, if the degrees of the $n$ vertices in increasing order as

$$d_{1} \leq d_{2} \leq ... \leq d_{n},$$

then for each index $k < n/2$ the inequality $k < d_{k}$ is satisfied.

Pósa's theorem states that if a finite undirected graph satisfies the Pósa condition, then that graph has a Hamiltonian cycle in it.
