= Zsolt Baranyai =

Hungarian mathematician

Zsolt Baranyai (June 23, 1948 in Budapest – April 6, 1978) was a Hungarian mathematician known for his work in combinatorics.

He graduated from Fazekas High School where he was a classmate of László Lovász, Miklós Laczkovich, and Lajos Pósa. He studied mathematics at Eötvös Loránd University and went on to become a lecturer in the Analysis Department. He earned his Ph.D. in 1975 and was posthumously awarded the Candidate degree of the Hungarian Academy of Sciences in 1978.

Baranyai is best known for his theorem on the decompositions of complete hypergraphs, which solved a long-standing open problem. In addition to his mathematical pursuits, Baranyai was also a professional musician who played the recorder. He died while touring Hungary with the Bakfark Consort in a car accident after a concert.
