= Dijoin =

Edges crossing all dicuts in a directed graph

When either of the red or blue sets of edges are contracted, the resulting graph becomes strongly connected. This means that each of these is a dijoin.

In mathematics, a dijoin is a subset of the edges of a directed graph, with the property that contracting every edge in the dijoin produces a strongly connected graph. Equivalently, a dijoin is a subset of the edges that, for every dicut, includes at least one edge contained in the dicut. Here, a dicut is a set of edges in a directed graph, defined from a partition of the vertices into two subsets, so that each edge that has an endpoint in both subsets is directed from the first subset to the second.

Woodall's conjecture, an unsolved problem in this area, states that in any directed graph the minimum number of edges in a dicut (the unweighted minimum closure) equals the maximum number of disjoint dijoins that can be found in the graph (a packing of dijoins). A fractional weighted version of the conjecture, posed by Jack Edmonds and Rick Giles, was refuted by Alexander Schrijver.

The Lucchesi–Younger theorem states that the minimum size of a dijoin, in any given directed graph, equals the maximum number of disjoint dicuts that can be found in the graph. The minimum weight dijoin in a weighted graph can be found in polynomial time, and is a special case of the submodular flow problem.

In planar graphs, dijoins and feedback arc sets are dual concepts. The dual graph of a directed graph, embedded in the plane, is a graph with a vertex for each face of the given graph, and a dual edge between two dual vertices when the corresponding two faces are separated by an edge. Each dual edge crosses one of the original graph edges, turned by 90° clockwise. A feedback arc set is a subset of the edges that includes at least one edge from every directed cycle. For a dijoin in the given graph, the corresponding set of edges forms a directed cut in the dual graph, and vice versa. This relationship between these two problems allows the feedback arc set problem to be solved efficiently for planar graphs, even though it is NP-hard for other types of graphs.
