= Dicut =

Vertex partition in a directed graph

All edges crossing between vertices of different colors are directed from red to blue. The set of these edges between colors is therefore a dicut. The set of blue vertices is a closure because there are no edges which exit it.

In mathematics, a dicut is a set of edges in a directed graph, defined from a partition of the vertices into two subsets, so that each edge that has an endpoint in both subsets is directed from the first subset to the second. This is analogous to a cut in undirected graphs (although the cut refers to the partition of vertices rather than the set of edges between them, so it is more accurate to say that the dicut is analogous to the cut-set). Each strongly connected component of the graph must be entirely contained in one of the two subsets, so a strongly connected graph has no nontrivial dicuts. Often, the underlying directed graph is assumed to be weakly connected; if not, the empty edge set would correspond to multiple vertex partitions.

The second of the two subsets in a dicut, a subset of vertices with no edges that exit the subset, is called a closure. The closure problem is the algorithmic problem of finding a dicut, in an edge-weighted directed graph, whose total weight is as large as possible. It can be solved in polynomial time.

In weakly connected planar graphs, dicuts and cycles are dual concepts. The dual graph of a directed graph, embedded in the plane, is a graph with a vertex for each face of the given graph, and a dual edge between two dual vertices when the corresponding two faces are separated by an edge. Each dual edge crosses one of the original graph edges, turned by 90° clockwise. For a dicut in the given graph, the duals of the edges in the dicut form a directed cycle in the dual graph, and vice versa.

A dijoin can be defined as a set of edges that contains at least one edge from every dicut; for this to exist, the given directed graph must be weakly connected. When the edges of a dijoin are contracted, the result is a strongly connected graph. Woodall's conjecture, an unsolved problem in this area, states that in any directed graph the minimum number of edges in a dicut (the unweighted minimum closure) equals the maximum number of disjoint dijoins that can be found in the graph (a packing of dijoins). A fractional weighted version of the conjecture, posed by Jack Edmonds and Rick Giles, was refuted by Alexander Schrijver. In the other direction, the Lucchesi–Younger theorem states that the minimum size of a dijoin equals the maximum number of disjoint dicuts that can be found in a given graph.
