= Miklós Baranyai =

Hungarian physician and politician

Member of the National Assembly
- In office 2 May 1990 – 27 June 1994

Personal details
- Born: 1934 Gödöllő, Hungary
- Died: 1997 (aged 62–63) Hatvan, Hungary
- Party: MDF
- Profession: physician, politician

Miklós Baranyai (1934–1997) was a Hungarian physician and politician, member of the National Assembly (MP) for Hatvan (Heves County Constituency IV) between 1990 and 1994.

== Biography ==
Baranyai was born in 1934 at Gödöllő. He studied in the Norbert of Xanten Grammar School of the Premonstratensian Order until 1948 when the school was nationalized and the monastic order was disbanded. As a result, he finished his secondary studies at the Könyves Kálmán Grammar School. He graduated as a physician from the Semmelweis University. He participated in the Hungarian Revolution of 1956. He transported wounded people after the protests on 23 October 1956. He started his medical career in Eger at the county hospital. In 1961 he was relocated to Poroszló as a general practitioner due to his political activity in 1956. He lived in Hatvan since 1966. He served as a Chief Medical in the Albert Schweitzer Hospital.

He was a member of the Hungarian Democratic Forum (MDF). He was elected Member of Parliament for Hatvan during the first democratic parliamentary election in 1990. He was appointed Vice Chairman of the Committee on Social, Family Affairs and Health. However he suffered a serious accident when he fell out from the window of his flat in August 1990. Baranyai went into a coma, and had never recovered. Despite his incapacity, he remained MP until the next parliamentary election in 1994. He also held the position of Committee Vice Chairman until 9 November 1992. He died in 1997.
