= Barania Góra =

Mountain in Poland

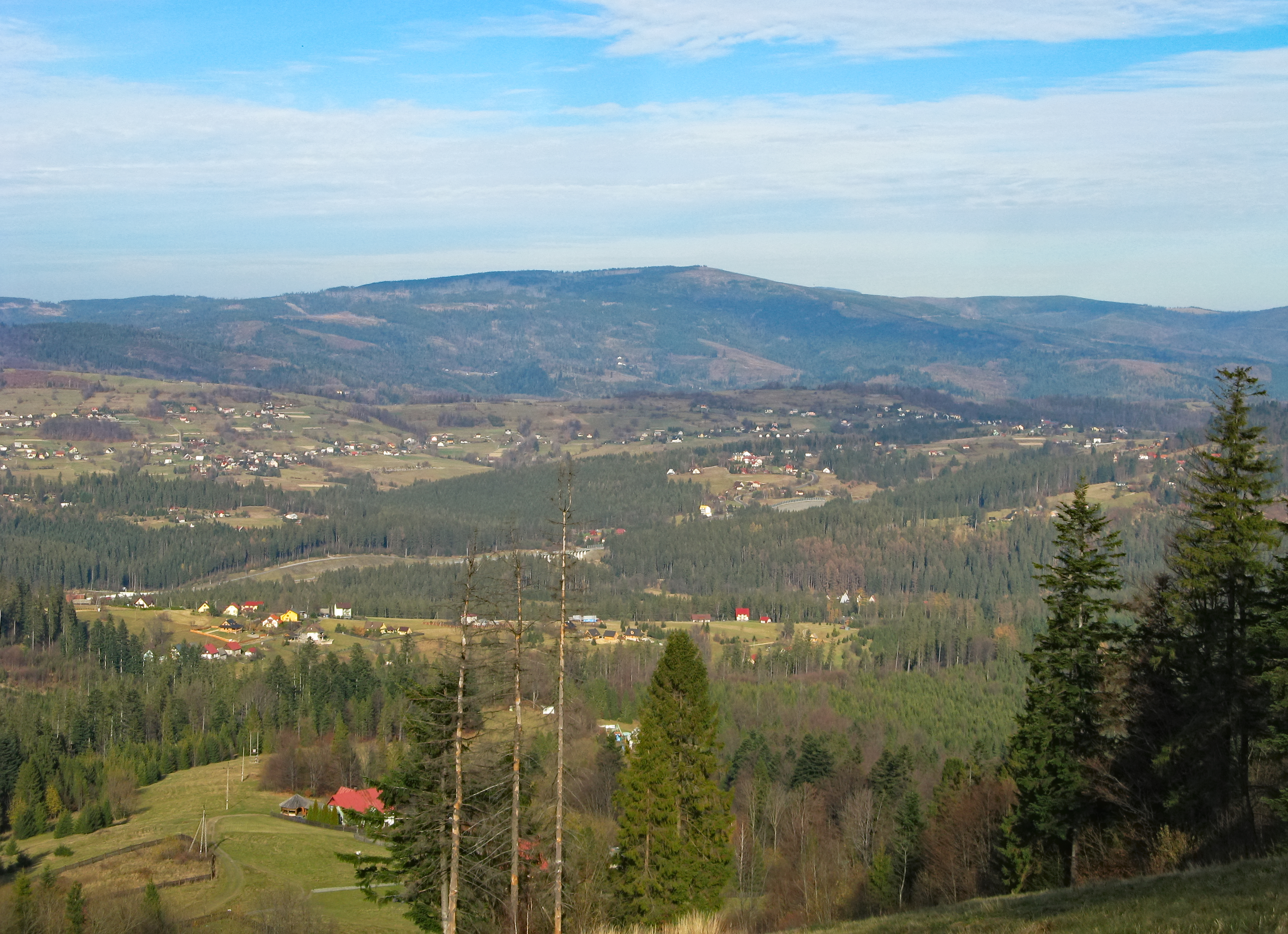
- Barania Góra, view from Rachowiec

Highest point
- Elevation: 1,220 m (4,000 ft)
- Prominence: 170 m (560 ft)
- Listing: Mountains of Poland
- Coordinates: 49°36′41″N 19°00′37″E

Geography
- Location within Poland Location within Silesian Voivodeship
- Location: Silesian Voivodeship, Poland
- Parent range: Silesian Beskids

Barania Góra (Polish for "Ram Mountain") (German: Widderberg; Silesian: Baraniŏ Gōra) is a mountain in southern Poland. At a height of 1,220 metres (4,000 ft), it is the second highest mountain in the Silesian Beskids.

The sources of the Vistula, the longest Polish river, are located on the western slope of the mountain.

A mountain hut, PTTK shelter Przysłop pod Barania Górą, is located relatively close to the peak, albeit at around 900 metres (3,000 ft) AMSL. The area around the mountain also plays host to many hiking trails.
