= Silesian Beskids =

Mountain range in Poland

- Beskid Śląski, Slezské Beskydy
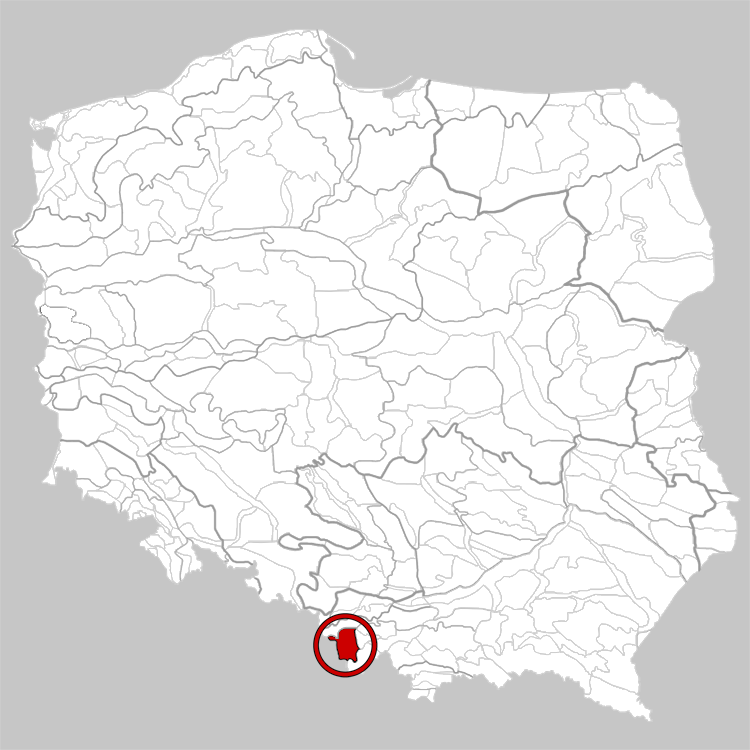
- Map of the Silesian Beskids within Poland

Highest point
- Peak: Skrzyczne
- Elevation: 1,257 m (4,124 ft)
- Coordinates: 49°41′0″N 19°3′0″E

Geography
- Countries: Poland and Czech Republic
- Parent range: Outer Western Carpathians; Western Beskids

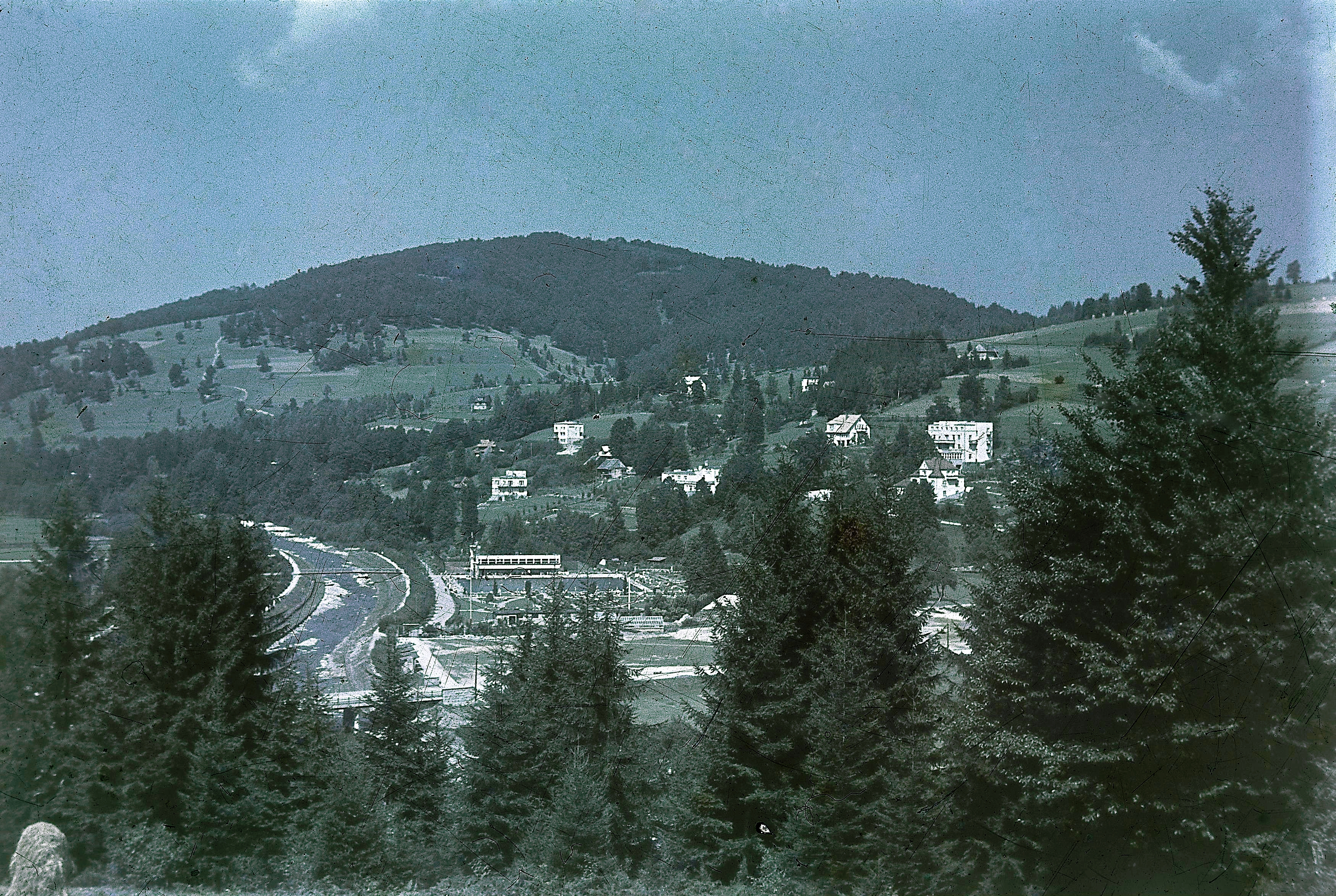
Panorama of the Silesian Beskids (Wisła)

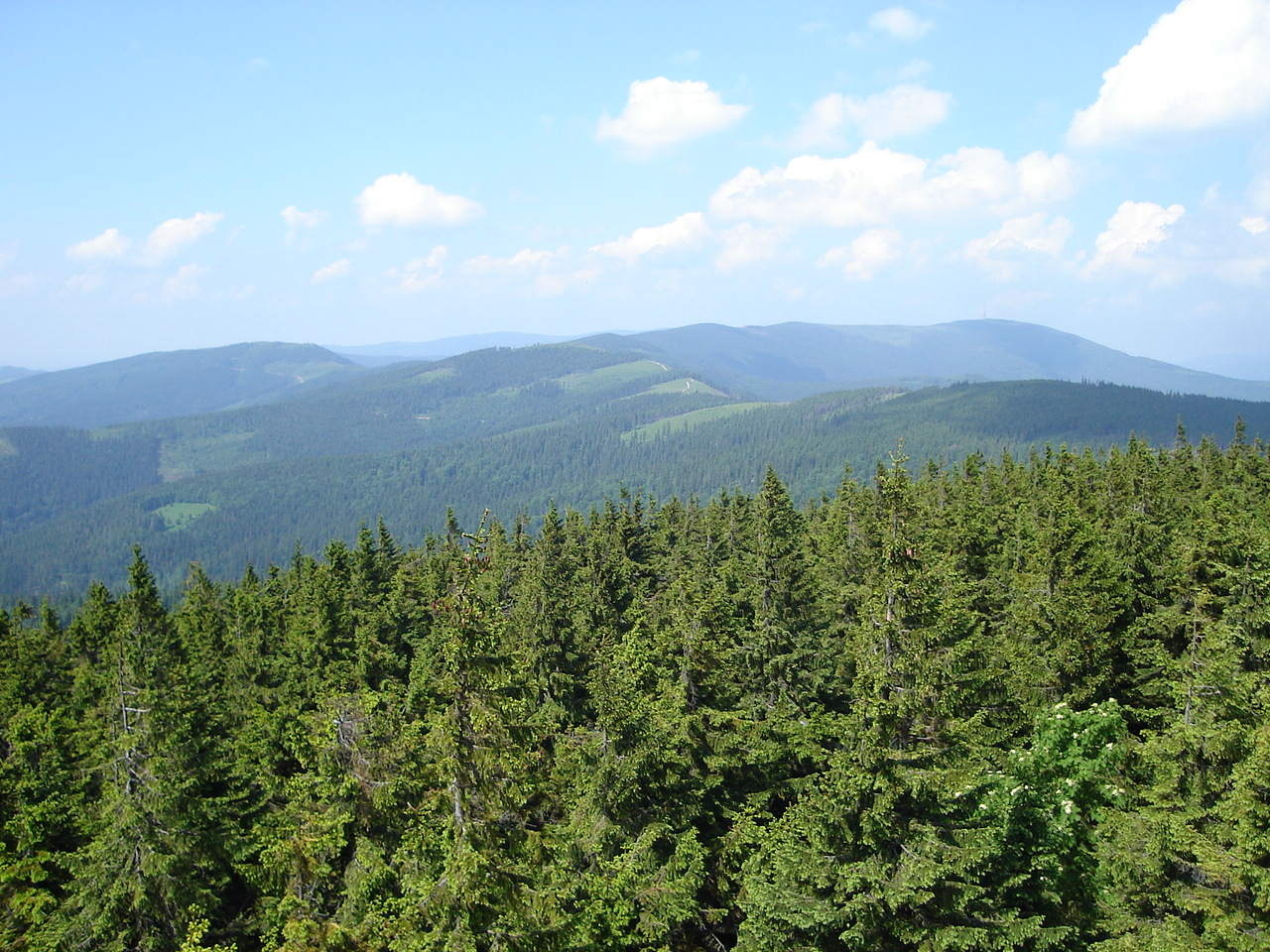
View of Skrzyczne from the watchtower on Barania Góra

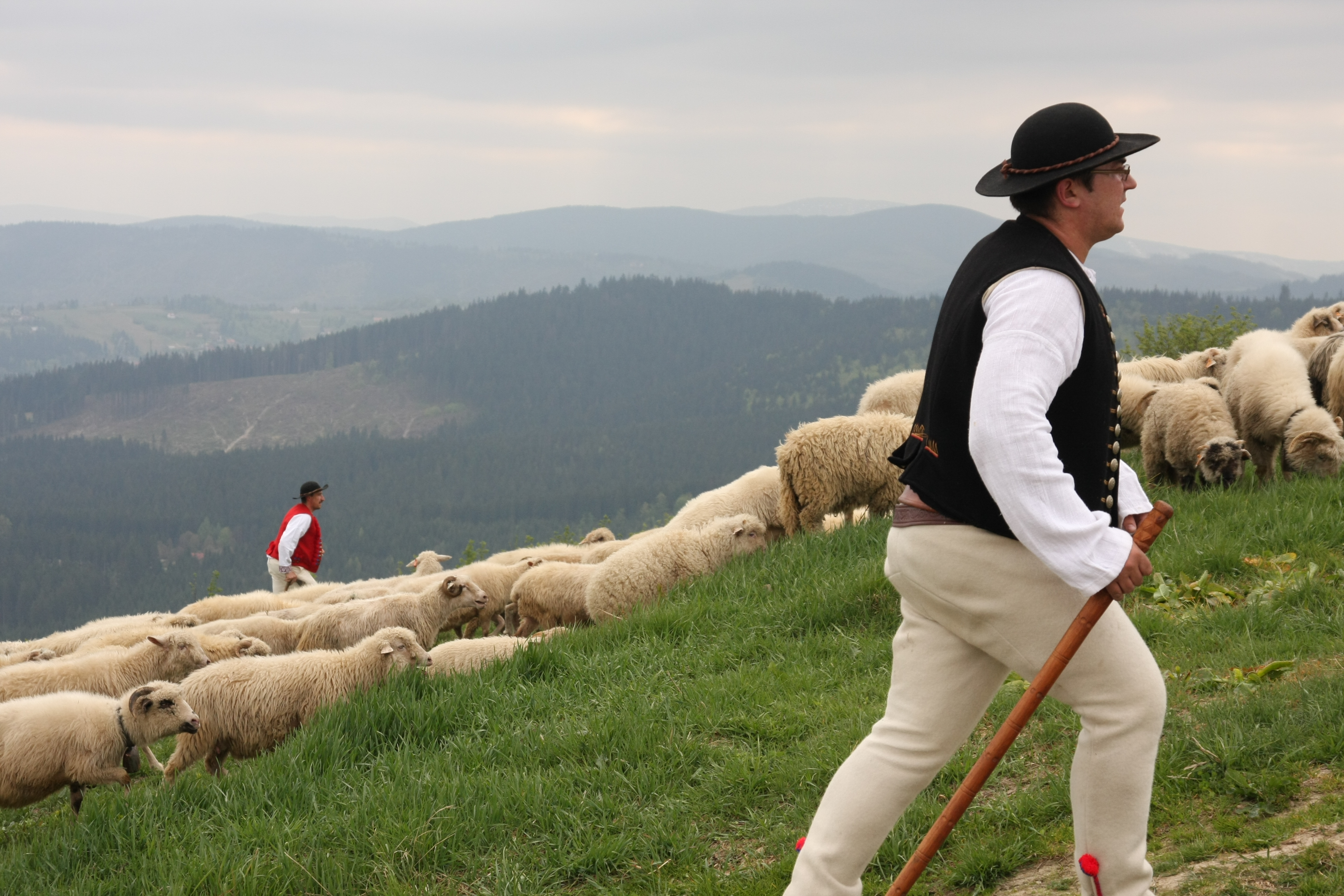
Shepherds in Silesian Beskids

Silesian Beskids (Polish: Beskid Śląski, Czech: Slezské Beskydy, German: Schlesische Beskiden) is one of the Beskids mountain ranges in the Outer Western Carpathians in southern Silesian Voivodeship, Poland and the eastern Moravian-Silesian Region, Czech Republic.

Most of the range lies in Poland. It is separated from the Moravian-Silesian Beskids by the Jablunkov Pass.

The Polish part of the range includes the protected area called Silesian Beskids Landscape Park.

== The highest mountains ==
Silesian Beskids have 20 mountains with a highest point above 1000 m, including three above 1200 m and nine above 1100 m.

- Skrzyczne (1,257 m) - the highest mountain
- Barania Góra (1,220 m)
- Małe Skrzyczne (1,211 m)
- Wierch Wisełka (1,192 m)
- Równiański Wierch (1,160 m)
- Zielony Kopiec (1,152 m)
- Malinowska Skała (1,152 m)
- Magurka Wiślańska (1,140 m)
- Klimczok (1,117 m)
- Malinów (1,115 m)
- Magura (1,109 m)
- Magurka Radziechowska (1,108 m)
- Trzy Kopce (1,082 m)
- Stołów (1,035 m)
- Glinne (1,034 m)
- Przysłop (1,029 m)
- Szyndzielnia (1,028 m)
- Muronka (1,021 m)
- Jaworzyna (1,020 m)
- Kościelec (1,019 m)
- Czantoria Wielka (995 m) - the highest mountain of the Czech part of the range
- Kiczory (990 m)
- Stożek Wielki (978 m)

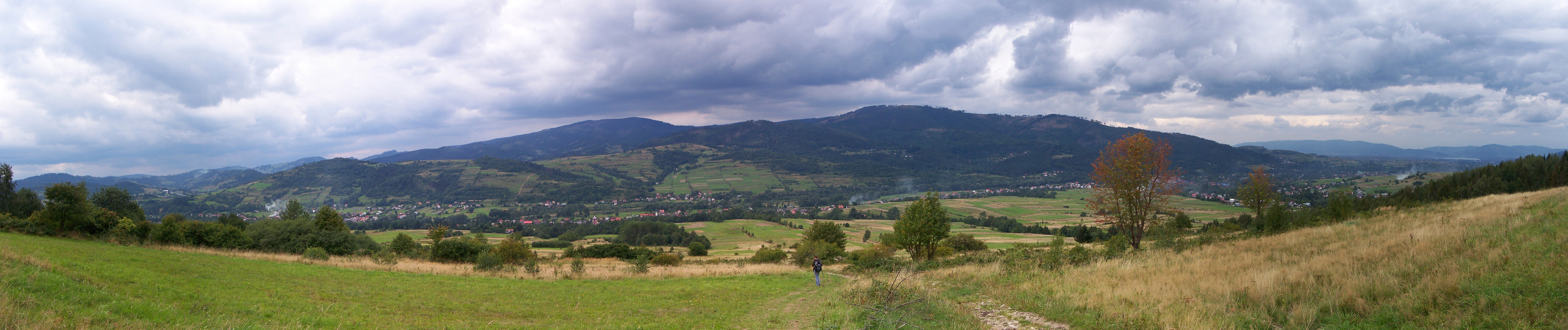
Panorama of the Silesian Beskids

== See also ==
- Cieszyn Silesia
- Polish minority in the Czech Republic
- Gorals
