= Szczyrk =

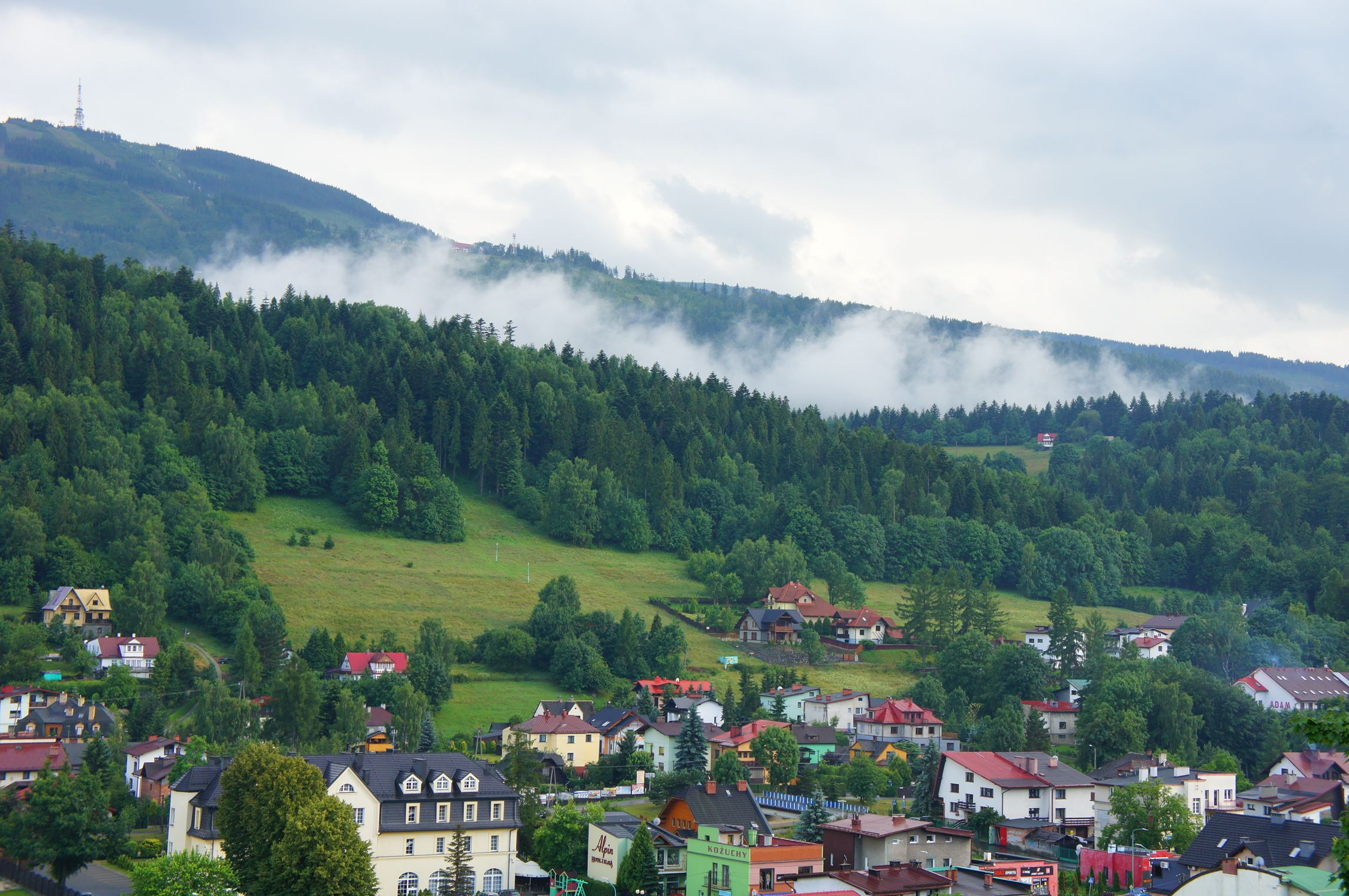
- Town panorama

- Coat of arms

- Location within Poland
- Coordinates: 49°42′58″N 19°1′37″E
- Country: Poland
- Voivodeship: Silesian
- County: Bielsko
- Gmina: Szczyrk (urban gmina)
- City rights: 1 January 1973

Government
  - Mayor: Antoni Byrdy

Area
  - Total: 39.07 km^{2} (15.09 sq mi)
- Highest elevation: 1,257 m (4,124 ft)
- Lowest elevation: 470 m (1,540 ft)

Population (2019-06-30)
  - Total: 5,734
  - Density: 146.8/km^{2} (380.1/sq mi)
- Time zone: UTC+1 (CET)
  - Summer (DST): UTC+2 (CEST)
- Postal code: 43-370
- Car plates: SBI
- Website: http://www.szczyrk.pl

Szczyrk (/ˈʃtʃɜːrk/; Polish pronunciation: [ʂt͡ʂɘrk]; German: Schirk [ˈʃɪʁk]) is a town in the Beskid Śląski mountains of southern Poland, situated in the valley of the Żylica river. It is part of the Silesian Voivodeship (since 1999), previously being part of the Bielsko-Biała Voivodeship (1975–1998). It has a population of 5,734 people (2019).

== History ==
First permanent human settlements in the area of present-day Szczyrk were reported in 16th century. According to chronicles, the village was inhabited by around 100 people in the 1730s. Initially, the majority of inhabitants were exclusively engaged in agriculture and sheep farming. Over the course of time, they began producing cloth from sheep's wool. Timber felling was also carried out in the area.

In the 19th century, the process of timber felling expanded rapidly and numerous water mills and sawmills started to be constructed. In the early 20th century, Szczyrk slowly bagan transforming into a resort town by attracting more and more tourists. In the 1920s, the area was popular with industrialists who erected villas and mountain hostels in the town. In 1927, mountain shelters on Mount Klimczok and Sampolska Pass were built. In 1933, the popular shelter on Skrzyczne was opened.

Following the 1939 Invasion of Poland, which started World War II, Szczyrk was occupied by Nazi Germany and annexed to the German Province of Upper Silesia. The Red Army captured the town on 12 February 1945, ending the Nazi occupation.

After World War II, the town experienced a tourist boom. Thanks to its picturesque location and Silesian Beskids mountains, it became a popular and well-known resort town and a winter sports center. In 1959, a chairlift leading to Mount Skrzyczne was opened becoming one of the top tourist attractions of the town. In 1973, Szczyrk was granted city rights.

== Tourism and geography ==
The town is a popular winter sports centre, with over 60 km (37 mi) of ski runs served by 30 ski lifts. Poland's Winter Olympics athletes train in Szczyrk for events such as skiing and ski jumping.

The two mountain ranges that surround the valley are dominated by the peaks of Skrzyczne at 1,257 metres (4,124 feet) and Klimczok 1,117 metres (3,665 feet), both of significant interest to tourists since they have commanding views from either peak. Moreover, both peaks are accessible to most people in one day's hike via the tourist routes. Skrzyczne is also accessible via a chairlift.

To the west of Szczyrk is Wisła, a town where the source of the Vistula (Wisła) river can be found (around the Barania Góra mountain).

The town is home Mercure Szczyrk Resort, Europe's longest hotel, which opened in 2024 and measures 330 meters (1,082 ft) in length. Situated 660 meters above sea level, the 447-room four-star hotel is also the highest altitude hotel in Poland.

== Gallery ==
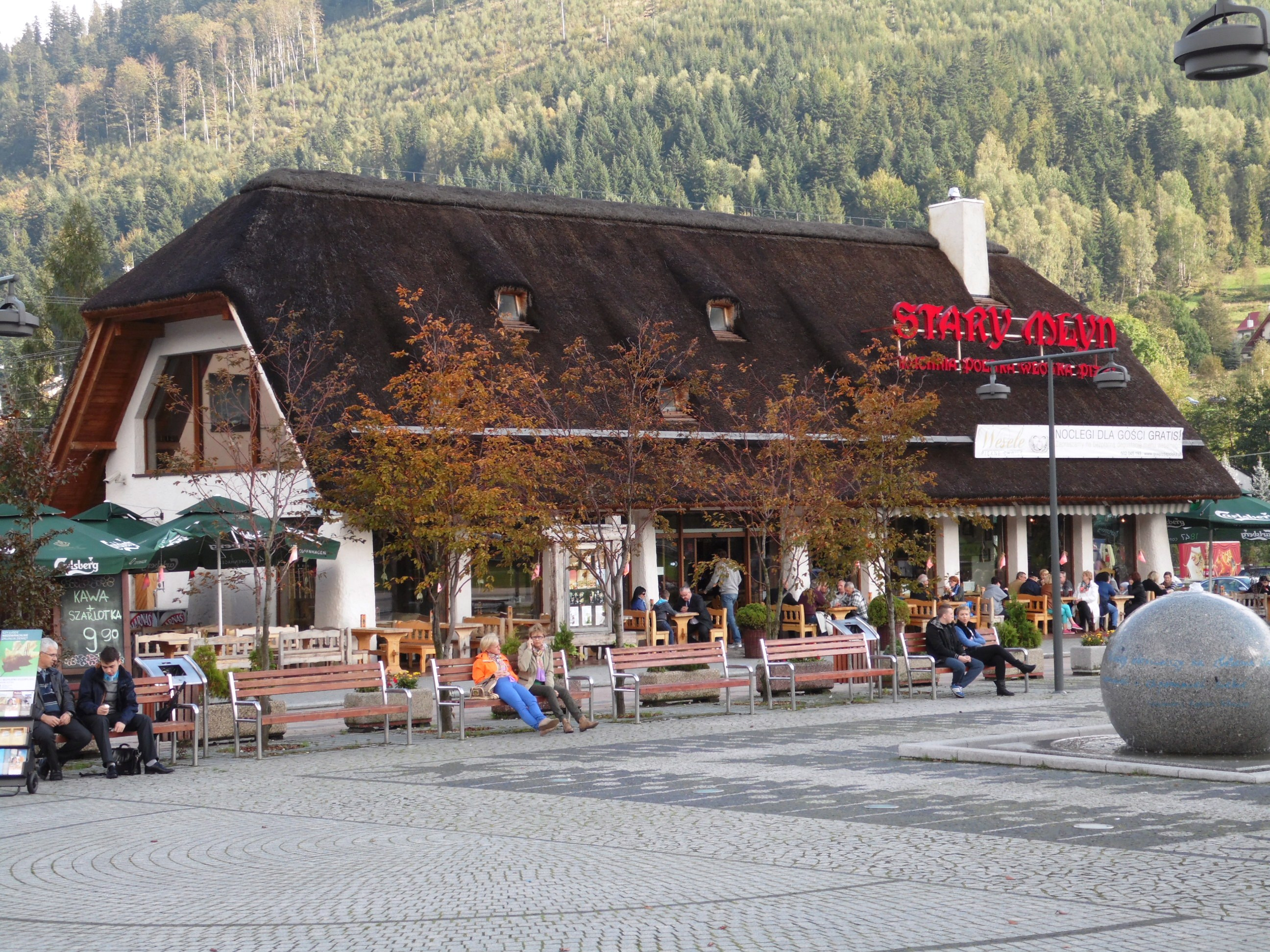
Square in the town centre

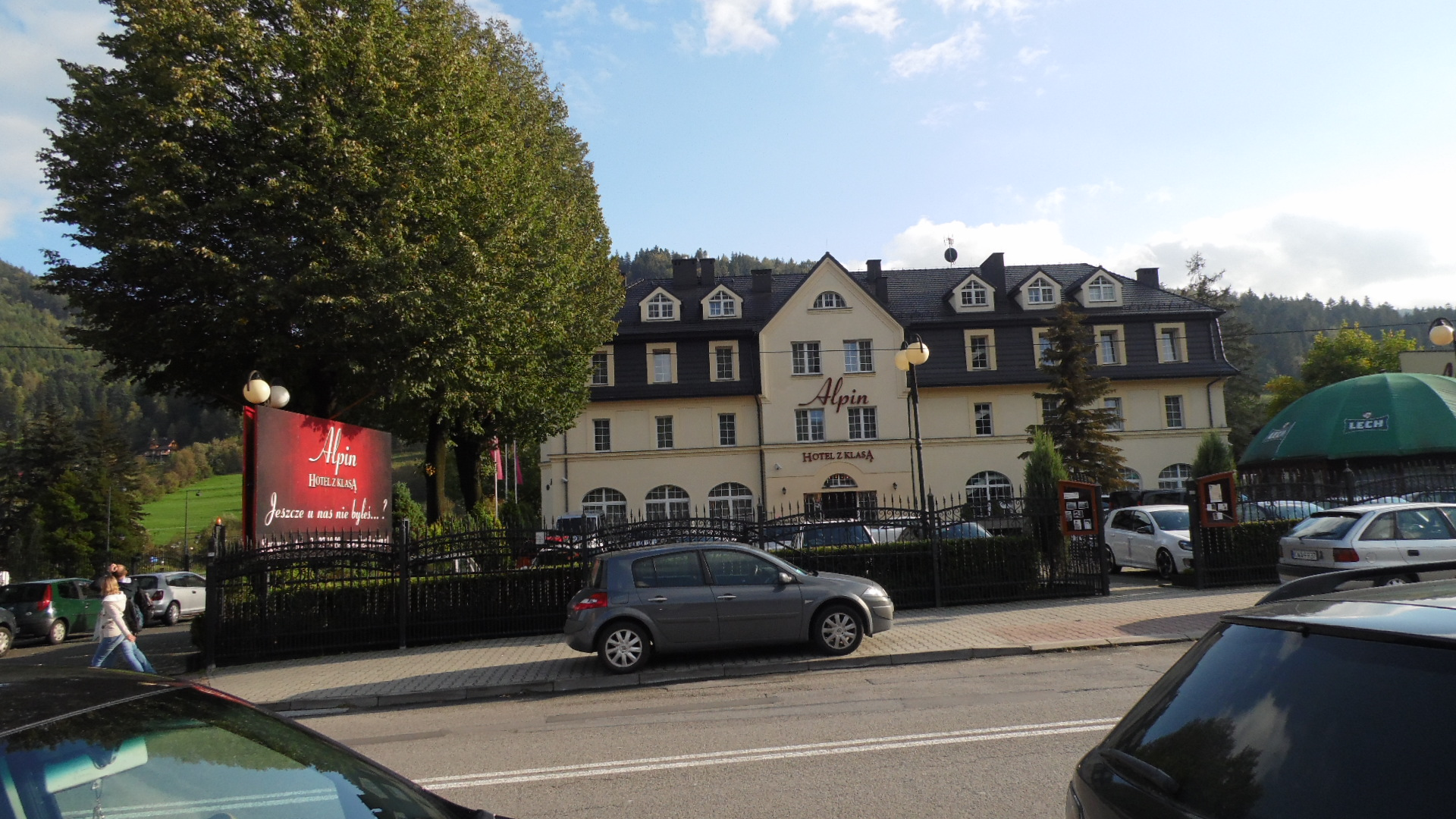
Hotel Alpin

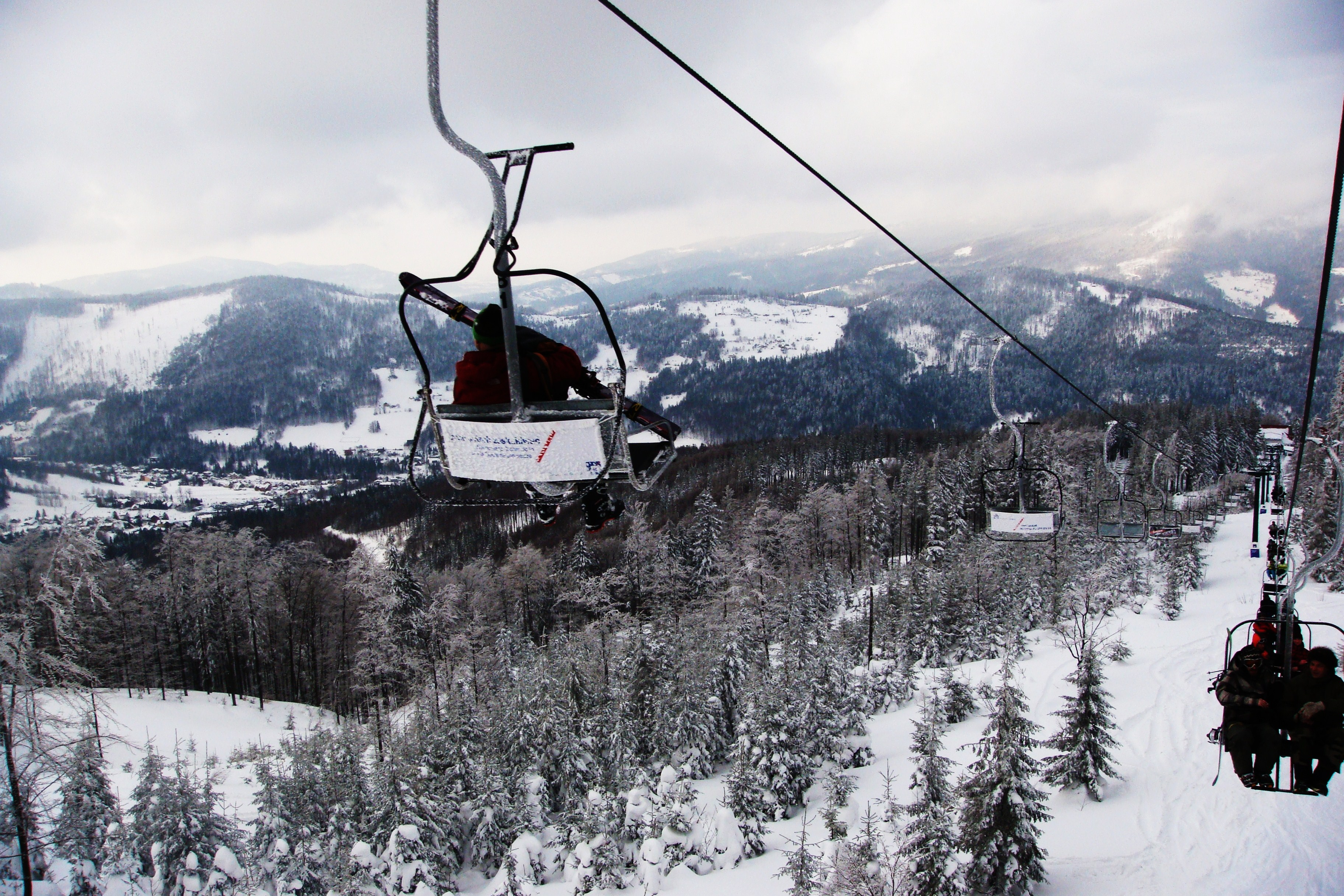
Ski lift

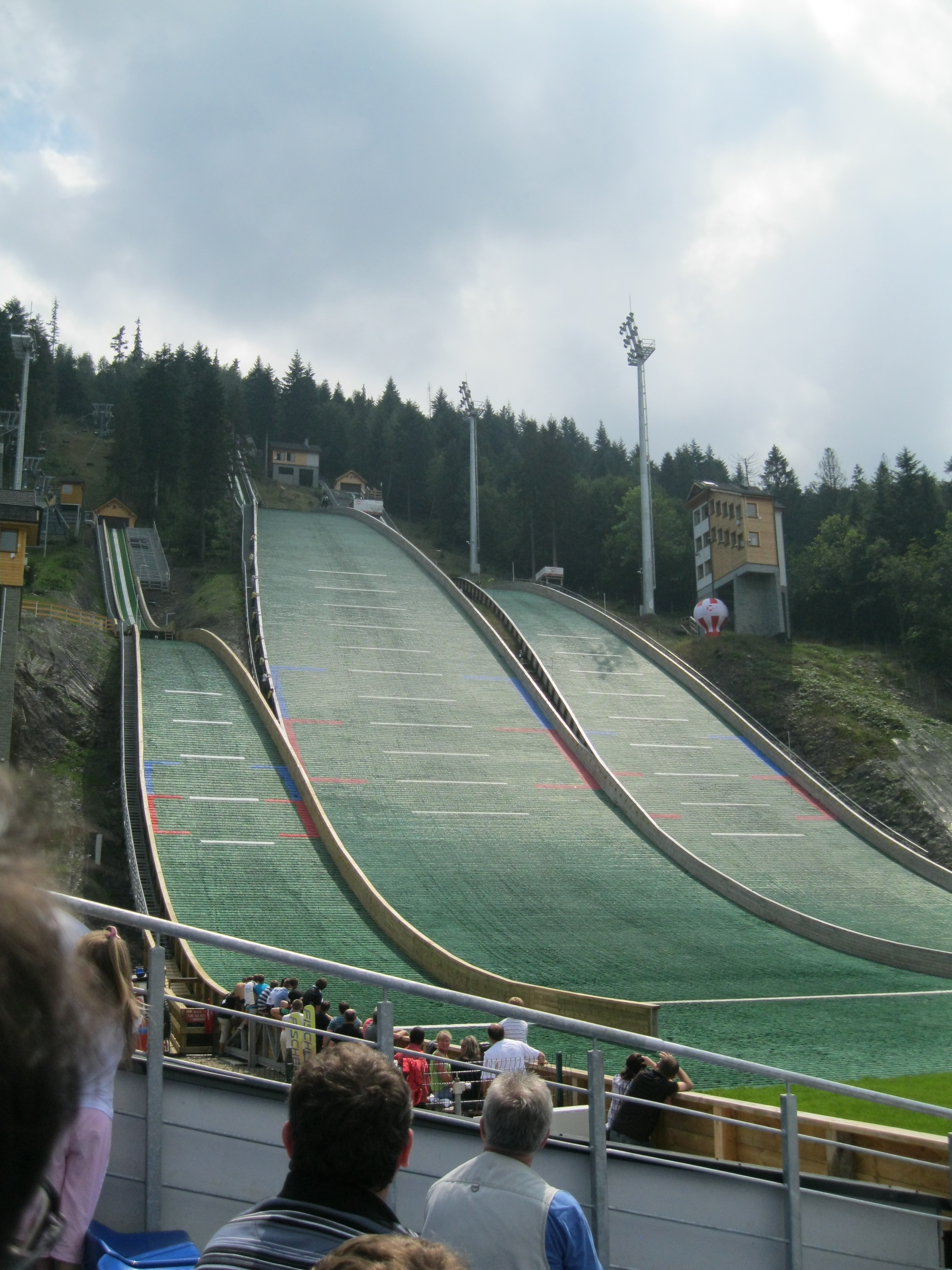
A ski jumping hill in Szczyrk

== Twin towns – sister cities ==
Szczyrk is twinned with:

- Ciorăşti, Romania (2004)
- Mikołajki, Poland (2007)
- Zetel, Germany (2008)
