= List of minor planets: 889001–890000 =

The following is a partial list of minor planets, running from minor-planet number 889001 through 890000, inclusive. The primary data for this and other partial lists is based on JPL's "Small-Body Orbital Elements" and data available from the Minor Planet Center. Critical list information is also provided by the MPC, unless otherwise specified from Lowell Observatory. A detailed description of the table's columns and additional sources are given on the main page including a complete list of every page in this series, and a statistical break-up on the dynamical classification of minor planets.

Also see the summary list of all named bodies in numerical and alphabetical order, and the corresponding naming citations for the number range of this particular list. New namings may only be added to this list after official publication, as the preannouncement of names is condemned by the Working Group for Small Bodies Nomenclature of the International Astronomical Union.

Near-Earth obj.	MBA (inner)	MBA (outer)	Centaur
Mars-crosser	MBA (middle)	Jupiter trojan	Trans-Neptunian obj.
Unclassified

== 889001–889100 ==
Designation			Discovery			Properties		Ref
Permanent	Provisional	Named after	Date	Site	Discoverer(s)	Category	Diam.	Ref
889001	2011 AU_{99}	—	January 14, 2011	Mount Lemmon	Mount Lemmon Survey	(6355)	2.3 km	MPC · JPL
889002	2011 AS_{101}	—	January 13, 2011	Mount Lemmon	Mount Lemmon Survey	·	1.4 km	MPC · JPL
889003	2011 AS_{106}	—	January 2, 2011	Mount Lemmon	Mount Lemmon Survey	NYS	790 m	MPC · JPL
889004	2011 AY_{106}	—	January 4, 2011	Mount Lemmon	Mount Lemmon Survey	·	1.9 km	MPC · JPL
889005	2011 BU_{1}	—	January 15, 2007	Mauna Kea	P. A. Wiegert	·	670 m	MPC · JPL
889006	2011 BE_{23}	—	January 26, 2011	Kitt Peak	Spacewatch	·	1.0 km	MPC · JPL
889007	2011 BC_{33}	—	December 1, 2006	Kitt Peak	Spacewatch	MAS	440 m	MPC · JPL
889008	2011 BQ_{33}	—	December 9, 2010	Mount Lemmon	Mount Lemmon Survey	·	810 m	MPC · JPL
889009	2011 BF_{37}	—	January 28, 2011	Mount Lemmon	Mount Lemmon Survey	NYS	650 m	MPC · JPL
889010	2011 BX_{57}	—	January 30, 2011	Mount Lemmon	Mount Lemmon Survey	MAS	470 m	MPC · JPL
889011	2011 BZ_{60}	—	January 23, 2011	Mount Lemmon	Mount Lemmon Survey	·	1.5 km	MPC · JPL
889012	2011 BC_{70}	—	December 8, 2010	Mount Lemmon	Mount Lemmon Survey	EUN	700 m	MPC · JPL
889013	2011 BM_{71}	—	February 10, 2011	Mount Lemmon	Mount Lemmon Survey	·	820 m	MPC · JPL
889014	2011 BM_{78}	—	December 8, 2010	Mount Lemmon	Mount Lemmon Survey	·	860 m	MPC · JPL
889015	2011 BS_{91}	—	January 28, 2011	Mount Lemmon	Mount Lemmon Survey	H	380 m	MPC · JPL
889016	2011 BX_{111}	—	January 29, 2011	Kitt Peak	Spacewatch	·	800 m	MPC · JPL
889017	2011 BH_{121}	—	February 7, 2011	Kitt Peak	Spacewatch	·	1.9 km	MPC · JPL
889018	2011 BX_{134}	—	January 29, 2011	Mount Lemmon	Mount Lemmon Survey	NYS	790 m	MPC · JPL
889019	2011 BG_{144}	—	January 29, 2011	Mount Lemmon	Mount Lemmon Survey	·	780 m	MPC · JPL
889020	2011 BE_{148}	—	January 29, 2011	Mount Lemmon	Mount Lemmon Survey	·	860 m	MPC · JPL
889021	2011 BQ_{151}	—	January 29, 2011	Kitt Peak	Spacewatch	H	330 m	MPC · JPL
889022	2011 BR_{152}	—	January 29, 2011	Kitt Peak	Spacewatch	·	610 m	MPC · JPL
889023	2011 BS_{164}	—	February 12, 2011	Mount Lemmon	Mount Lemmon Survey	·	730 m	MPC · JPL
889024	2011 BA_{167}	—	February 9, 2011	Mount Lemmon	Mount Lemmon Survey	·	920 m	MPC · JPL
889025	2011 BM_{168}	—	February 10, 2011	Mount Lemmon	Mount Lemmon Survey	·	1.8 km	MPC · JPL
889026	2011 BE_{171}	—	January 30, 2011	Mount Lemmon	Mount Lemmon Survey	·	770 m	MPC · JPL
889027	2011 BZ_{171}	—	January 30, 2011	Mount Lemmon	Mount Lemmon Survey	·	960 m	MPC · JPL
889028	2011 BN_{173}	—	January 27, 2011	Mount Lemmon	Mount Lemmon Survey	·	780 m	MPC · JPL
889029	2011 BJ_{175}	—	September 10, 2013	Haleakala	Pan-STARRS 1	·	940 m	MPC · JPL
889030	2011 BH_{178}	—	February 7, 2011	Mount Lemmon	Mount Lemmon Survey	·	730 m	MPC · JPL
889031	2011 BM_{180}	—	January 30, 2011	Kitt Peak	Spacewatch	·	960 m	MPC · JPL
889032	2011 BK_{182}	—	September 19, 2014	Haleakala	Pan-STARRS 1	·	1.4 km	MPC · JPL
889033	2011 BV_{182}	—	January 28, 2011	Mount Lemmon	Mount Lemmon Survey	·	730 m	MPC · JPL
889034	2011 BZ_{185}	—	January 16, 2011	Mount Lemmon	Mount Lemmon Survey	MAS	440 m	MPC · JPL
889035	2011 BO_{186}	—	February 7, 2011	Mount Lemmon	Mount Lemmon Survey	·	420 m	MPC · JPL
889036	2011 BW_{189}	—	February 17, 2015	Haleakala	Pan-STARRS 1	·	760 m	MPC · JPL
889037	2011 BD_{190}	—	February 5, 2011	Mount Lemmon	Mount Lemmon Survey	·	840 m	MPC · JPL
889038	2011 BV_{192}	—	January 2, 2016	Mount Lemmon	Mount Lemmon Survey	·	1.4 km	MPC · JPL
889039	2011 BJ_{193}	—	January 29, 2011	Mount Lemmon	Mount Lemmon Survey	·	460 m	MPC · JPL
889040	2011 BY_{193}	—	January 25, 2011	Kitt Peak	Spacewatch	EOS	1.2 km	MPC · JPL
889041	2011 BB_{194}	—	January 28, 2011	Mount Lemmon	Mount Lemmon Survey	·	1.4 km	MPC · JPL
889042	2011 BQ_{194}	—	January 28, 2011	Mount Lemmon	Mount Lemmon Survey	·	760 m	MPC · JPL
889043	2011 BX_{194}	—	January 26, 2011	Kitt Peak	Spacewatch	3:2	2.9 km	MPC · JPL
889044	2011 BW_{195}	—	January 27, 2011	Mount Lemmon	Mount Lemmon Survey	·	1.1 km	MPC · JPL
889045	2011 BG_{197}	—	January 28, 2011	Mount Lemmon	Mount Lemmon Survey	T_{j} (2.98) · 3:2	3.5 km	MPC · JPL
889046	2011 BS_{202}	—	January 28, 2011	Mount Lemmon	Mount Lemmon Survey	·	850 m	MPC · JPL
889047	2011 BN_{203}	—	January 30, 2011	Mount Lemmon	Mount Lemmon Survey	·	1.1 km	MPC · JPL
889048	2011 BD_{204}	—	January 27, 2011	Kitt Peak	Spacewatch	PHO	630 m	MPC · JPL
889049	2011 BF_{209}	—	January 28, 2011	Mauna Kea	P. A. Wiegert	·	1.3 km	MPC · JPL
889050	2011 BR_{213}	—	January 23, 2011	Mount Lemmon	Mount Lemmon Survey	·	1.3 km	MPC · JPL
889051	2011 BS_{213}	—	January 26, 2011	Mount Lemmon	Mount Lemmon Survey	·	690 m	MPC · JPL
889052	2011 CH_{14}	—	January 27, 2011	Mount Lemmon	Mount Lemmon Survey	NYS	1.0 km	MPC · JPL
889053	2011 CV_{15}	—	February 2, 2011	Kitt Peak	Spacewatch	·	1.9 km	MPC · JPL
889054	2011 CC_{28}	—	February 4, 2011	Mayhill-ISON	L. Elenin	H	340 m	MPC · JPL
889055	2011 CY_{35}	—	February 5, 2011	Catalina	CSS	·	710 m	MPC · JPL
889056	2011 CG_{43}	—	February 5, 2011	Mount Lemmon	Mount Lemmon Survey	·	730 m	MPC · JPL
889057	2011 CN_{51}	—	January 27, 2011	Mount Lemmon	Mount Lemmon Survey	NYS	830 m	MPC · JPL
889058	2011 CD_{52}	—	February 7, 2011	Mount Lemmon	Mount Lemmon Survey	NYS	680 m	MPC · JPL
889059	2011 CR_{52}	—	February 7, 2011	Mount Lemmon	Mount Lemmon Survey	LIX	1.8 km	MPC · JPL
889060	2011 CP_{65}	—	February 21, 2007	Mount Lemmon	Mount Lemmon Survey	NYS	800 m	MPC · JPL
889061	2011 CV_{68}	—	February 5, 2011	Catalina	CSS	·	740 m	MPC · JPL
889062	2011 CV_{71}	—	January 30, 2011	Mount Lemmon	Mount Lemmon Survey	·	1.3 km	MPC · JPL
889063	2011 CP_{95}	—	March 2, 2011	Mount Lemmon	Mount Lemmon Survey	·	1.3 km	MPC · JPL
889064	2011 CL_{98}	—	February 5, 2011	Haleakala	Pan-STARRS 1	·	1.3 km	MPC · JPL
889065	2011 CV_{105}	—	February 12, 2011	Mount Lemmon	Mount Lemmon Survey	·	750 m	MPC · JPL
889066	2011 CX_{108}	—	February 25, 2011	Mount Lemmon	Mount Lemmon Survey	·	1.1 km	MPC · JPL
889067	2011 CQ_{109}	—	January 28, 2011	Kitt Peak	Spacewatch	·	790 m	MPC · JPL
889068	2011 CD_{111}	—	February 5, 2011	Haleakala	Pan-STARRS 1	·	790 m	MPC · JPL
889069	2011 CS_{111}	—	February 5, 2011	Haleakala	Pan-STARRS 1	·	1.2 km	MPC · JPL
889070	2011 CM_{117}	—	January 29, 2011	Mount Lemmon	Mount Lemmon Survey	·	810 m	MPC · JPL
889071	2011 CB_{123}	—	March 2, 2011	Mount Lemmon	Mount Lemmon Survey	V	420 m	MPC · JPL
889072	2011 CB_{124}	—	February 11, 2011	Mount Lemmon	Mount Lemmon Survey	·	740 m	MPC · JPL
889073	2011 CU_{126}	—	February 3, 2011	Piszkéstető	K. Sárneczky, Z. Kuli	·	800 m	MPC · JPL
889074	2011 CG_{129}	—	February 8, 2011	Mount Lemmon	Mount Lemmon Survey	NYS	710 m	MPC · JPL
889075	2011 CZ_{129}	—	May 19, 2020	Haleakala	Pan-STARRS 1	·	830 m	MPC · JPL
889076	2011 CE_{132}	—	July 29, 2017	Haleakala	Pan-STARRS 1	·	700 m	MPC · JPL
889077	2011 CW_{135}	—	February 7, 2011	Mount Lemmon	Mount Lemmon Survey	·	1.7 km	MPC · JPL
889078	2011 CS_{137}	—	February 5, 2011	Mount Lemmon	Mount Lemmon Survey	·	1.3 km	MPC · JPL
889079	2011 CY_{137}	—	February 5, 2011	Haleakala	Pan-STARRS 1	·	1.1 km	MPC · JPL
889080	2011 CA_{138}	—	February 11, 2011	Mount Lemmon	Mount Lemmon Survey	·	820 m	MPC · JPL
889081	2011 CQ_{138}	—	February 7, 2011	Kitt Peak	Spacewatch	·	740 m	MPC · JPL
889082	2011 CE_{143}	—	February 10, 2011	Catalina	CSS	PHO	520 m	MPC · JPL
889083	2011 CW_{143}	—	February 9, 2011	Mount Lemmon	Mount Lemmon Survey	·	900 m	MPC · JPL
889084	2011 CK_{144}	—	February 12, 2011	Mount Lemmon	Mount Lemmon Survey	·	710 m	MPC · JPL
889085	2011 DL_{12}	—	January 24, 2011	Mount Lemmon	Mount Lemmon Survey	T_{j} (2.93)	2.5 km	MPC · JPL
889086	2011 DL_{35}	—	February 25, 2011	Mount Lemmon	Mount Lemmon Survey	·	850 m	MPC · JPL
889087	2011 DW_{37}	—	February 25, 2011	Mount Lemmon	Mount Lemmon Survey	·	830 m	MPC · JPL
889088	2011 DT_{44}	—	February 26, 2011	Mount Lemmon	Mount Lemmon Survey	MAS	490 m	MPC · JPL
889089	2011 DW_{60}	—	January 27, 2007	Mount Lemmon	Mount Lemmon Survey	·	760 m	MPC · JPL
889090	2011 EE_{4}	—	March 1, 2011	Mount Lemmon	Mount Lemmon Survey	·	860 m	MPC · JPL
889091	2011 EJ_{9}	—	March 2, 2011	Kitt Peak	Spacewatch	·	700 m	MPC · JPL
889092	2011 EW_{14}	—	March 4, 2011	Kitt Peak	Spacewatch	·	400 m	MPC · JPL
889093	2011 EC_{16}	—	January 29, 2011	Kitt Peak	Spacewatch	·	920 m	MPC · JPL
889094	2011 EU_{43}	—	March 24, 2006	Mount Lemmon	Mount Lemmon Survey	·	1.4 km	MPC · JPL
889095	2011 EO_{46}	—	March 10, 2011	Kitt Peak	Spacewatch	·	1.1 km	MPC · JPL
889096	2011 EW_{57}	—	February 25, 2011	Kitt Peak	Spacewatch	·	1.0 km	MPC · JPL
889097	2011 EY_{59}	—	March 12, 2011	Mount Lemmon	Mount Lemmon Survey	·	810 m	MPC · JPL
889098	2011 EZ_{65}	—	March 10, 2011	Kitt Peak	Spacewatch	·	870 m	MPC · JPL
889099	2011 EZ_{68}	—	March 2, 2011	Kitt Peak	Spacewatch	·	800 m	MPC · JPL
889100	2011 EO_{69}	—	March 10, 2011	Kitt Peak	Spacewatch	·	1.0 km	MPC · JPL

== 889101–889200 ==
back to top

Designation			Discovery			Properties		Ref
Permanent	Provisional	Named after	Date	Site	Discoverer(s)	Category	Diam.	Ref
889101	2011 EN_{94}	—	March 11, 2011	Mount Lemmon	Mount Lemmon Survey	H	270 m	MPC · JPL
889102	2011 EB_{95}	—	March 14, 2011	Mount Lemmon	Mount Lemmon Survey	·	870 m	MPC · JPL
889103	2011 EG_{100}	—	March 13, 2011	Kitt Peak	Spacewatch	NYS	790 m	MPC · JPL
889104	2011 EJ_{100}	—	March 13, 2011	Mount Lemmon	Mount Lemmon Survey	·	1.6 km	MPC · JPL
889105	2011 ER_{103}	—	March 4, 2011	Mount Lemmon	Mount Lemmon Survey	·	970 m	MPC · JPL
889106	2011 ER_{104}	—	March 10, 2011	Mount Lemmon	Mount Lemmon Survey	·	2.1 km	MPC · JPL
889107	2011 EC_{106}	—	March 14, 2011	Kitt Peak	Spacewatch	·	790 m	MPC · JPL
889108	2011 EF_{106}	—	March 10, 2011	Kitt Peak	Spacewatch	·	450 m	MPC · JPL
889109	2011 ET_{106}	—	March 1, 2011	Mount Lemmon	Mount Lemmon Survey	·	1.4 km	MPC · JPL
889110	2011 EQ_{108}	—	March 6, 2011	Kitt Peak	Spacewatch	·	470 m	MPC · JPL
889111	2011 EH_{110}	—	March 1, 2011	Mount Lemmon	Mount Lemmon Survey	·	700 m	MPC · JPL
889112	2011 ET_{111}	—	February 25, 2011	Mount Lemmon	Mount Lemmon Survey	·	680 m	MPC · JPL
889113	2011 FF_{22}	—	March 27, 2011	Mount Lemmon	Mount Lemmon Survey	·	900 m	MPC · JPL
889114	2011 FO_{29}	—	March 31, 2011	Haleakala	Pan-STARRS 1	·	240 m	MPC · JPL
889115	2011 FA_{32}	—	March 28, 2011	Mount Lemmon	Mount Lemmon Survey	NYS	760 m	MPC · JPL
889116	2011 FX_{32}	—	March 28, 2011	Mount Lemmon	Mount Lemmon Survey	·	780 m	MPC · JPL
889117	2011 FM_{42}	—	March 26, 2011	Mount Lemmon	Mount Lemmon Survey	·	1.5 km	MPC · JPL
889118	2011 FF_{48}	—	January 28, 2007	Mount Lemmon	Mount Lemmon Survey	·	860 m	MPC · JPL
889119	2011 FD_{59}	—	March 30, 2011	Mount Lemmon	Mount Lemmon Survey	·	970 m	MPC · JPL
889120	2011 FN_{60}	—	March 30, 2011	Mount Lemmon	Mount Lemmon Survey	·	1.3 km	MPC · JPL
889121	2011 FE_{64}	—	March 13, 2011	Kitt Peak	Spacewatch	H	330 m	MPC · JPL
889122	2011 FQ_{64}	—	March 29, 2011	XuYi	PMO NEO Survey Program	·	950 m	MPC · JPL
889123	2011 FK_{85}	—	March 14, 2011	Mount Lemmon	Mount Lemmon Survey	H	390 m	MPC · JPL
889124	2011 FL_{88}	—	January 28, 2007	Mount Lemmon	Mount Lemmon Survey	NYS	790 m	MPC · JPL
889125	2011 FR_{110}	—	April 1, 2011	Mount Lemmon	Mount Lemmon Survey	·	940 m	MPC · JPL
889126	2011 FR_{115}	—	April 2, 2011	Mount Lemmon	Mount Lemmon Survey	·	1.6 km	MPC · JPL
889127	2011 FM_{124}	—	April 1, 2011	Mount Lemmon	Mount Lemmon Survey	·	710 m	MPC · JPL
889128	2011 FY_{125}	—	February 23, 2007	Mount Lemmon	Mount Lemmon Survey	NYS	840 m	MPC · JPL
889129	2011 FL_{140}	—	March 31, 2011	Kitt Peak	Spacewatch	·	670 m	MPC · JPL
889130	2011 FF_{158}	—	October 3, 2013	Haleakala	Pan-STARRS 1	·	900 m	MPC · JPL
889131	2011 FJ_{162}	—	March 27, 2011	Mount Lemmon	Mount Lemmon Survey	·	880 m	MPC · JPL
889132	2011 FC_{168}	—	March 30, 2011	Mount Lemmon	Mount Lemmon Survey	NYS	860 m	MPC · JPL
889133	2011 FS_{168}	—	March 27, 2011	Mount Lemmon	Mount Lemmon Survey	·	990 m	MPC · JPL
889134	2011 FL_{169}	—	March 26, 2011	Mount Lemmon	Mount Lemmon Survey	·	930 m	MPC · JPL
889135	2011 FQ_{172}	—	March 30, 2011	Mount Lemmon	Mount Lemmon Survey	·	470 m	MPC · JPL
889136	2011 GH_{3}	—	April 2, 2011	Mount Lemmon	Mount Lemmon Survey	APO	740 m	MPC · JPL
889137	2011 GZ_{22}	—	April 4, 2011	Mount Lemmon	Mount Lemmon Survey	·	1.2 km	MPC · JPL
889138	2011 GS_{28}	—	February 26, 2011	Kitt Peak	Spacewatch	·	740 m	MPC · JPL
889139	2011 GL_{36}	—	April 3, 2011	Haleakala	Pan-STARRS 1	·	830 m	MPC · JPL
889140	2011 GE_{71}	—	April 15, 2011	Haleakala	Pan-STARRS 1	H	260 m	MPC · JPL
889141	2011 GY_{80}	—	April 13, 2011	Mount Lemmon	Mount Lemmon Survey	·	1.3 km	MPC · JPL
889142	2011 GM_{84}	—	May 5, 2006	Kitt Peak	Spacewatch	·	1.5 km	MPC · JPL
889143	2011 GQ_{84}	—	April 11, 2007	Mount Lemmon	Mount Lemmon Survey	NYS	880 m	MPC · JPL
889144	2011 GU_{94}	—	April 5, 2011	Kitt Peak	Spacewatch	EOS	1.2 km	MPC · JPL
889145	2011 GJ_{107}	—	April 3, 2011	Haleakala	Pan-STARRS 1	·	1.2 km	MPC · JPL
889146	2011 HJ_{4}	—	April 26, 2011	Mount Lemmon	Mount Lemmon Survey	·	1.3 km	MPC · JPL
889147	2011 HD_{11}	—	March 14, 2011	Kitt Peak	Spacewatch	·	840 m	MPC · JPL
889148	2011 HJ_{24}	—	April 28, 2011	Mount Lemmon	Mount Lemmon Survey	H	340 m	MPC · JPL
889149	2011 HT_{42}	—	April 27, 2011	Mount Lemmon	Mount Lemmon Survey	·	850 m	MPC · JPL
889150	2011 HF_{50}	—	April 29, 2011	Kitt Peak	Spacewatch	·	510 m	MPC · JPL
889151	2011 HV_{61}	—	April 28, 2011	Haleakala	Pan-STARRS 1	H	320 m	MPC · JPL
889152	2011 HW_{61}	—	April 28, 2011	Kitt Peak	Spacewatch	H	380 m	MPC · JPL
889153	2011 HX_{70}	—	March 11, 2011	Mount Lemmon	Mount Lemmon Survey	·	800 m	MPC · JPL
889154	2011 HQ_{77}	—	April 2, 2011	Kitt Peak	Spacewatch	·	510 m	MPC · JPL
889155	2011 HU_{77}	—	October 6, 2005	Mount Lemmon	Mount Lemmon Survey	·	490 m	MPC · JPL
889156	2011 HY_{77}	—	March 6, 2011	Kitt Peak	Spacewatch	·	900 m	MPC · JPL
889157	2011 HH_{79}	—	April 30, 2011	Haleakala	Pan-STARRS 1	·	2.0 km	MPC · JPL
889158	2011 HR_{86}	—	April 6, 2011	Mount Lemmon	Mount Lemmon Survey	·	910 m	MPC · JPL
889159	2011 HP_{88}	—	April 28, 2011	Mount Lemmon	Mount Lemmon Survey	·	520 m	MPC · JPL
889160	2011 HF_{91}	—	April 23, 2011	Kitt Peak	Spacewatch	·	890 m	MPC · JPL
889161	2011 HG_{94}	—	April 13, 2011	Mount Lemmon	Mount Lemmon Survey	·	1.4 km	MPC · JPL
889162	2011 HK_{106}	—	April 23, 2011	Haleakala	Pan-STARRS 1	·	900 m	MPC · JPL
889163	2011 HF_{111}	—	April 28, 2011	Mount Lemmon	Mount Lemmon Survey	EOS	1.3 km	MPC · JPL
889164	2011 HN_{111}	—	April 30, 2011	Haleakala	Pan-STARRS 1	·	1.0 km	MPC · JPL
889165	2011 HT_{114}	—	April 30, 2011	Haleakala	Pan-STARRS 1	·	1.8 km	MPC · JPL
889166	2011 JD_{15}	—	May 8, 2011	Kitt Peak	Spacewatch	·	1.8 km	MPC · JPL
889167	2011 JC_{22}	—	May 1, 2011	Haleakala	Pan-STARRS 1	·	1.9 km	MPC · JPL
889168	2011 JJ_{22}	—	May 1, 2011	Haleakala	Pan-STARRS 1	PHO	610 m	MPC · JPL
889169	2011 JP_{34}	—	May 1, 2011	Haleakala	Pan-STARRS 1	H	310 m	MPC · JPL
889170	2011 JG_{37}	—	May 8, 2011	Mount Lemmon	Mount Lemmon Survey	·	1.0 km	MPC · JPL
889171	2011 JU_{38}	—	May 13, 2011	Mount Lemmon	Mount Lemmon Survey	·	800 m	MPC · JPL
889172	2011 JL_{40}	—	May 1, 2011	Haleakala	Pan-STARRS 1	·	1.8 km	MPC · JPL
889173	2011 KA_{7}	—	May 24, 2011	Mount Lemmon	Mount Lemmon Survey	TIR	2.0 km	MPC · JPL
889174	2011 KK_{10}	—	April 30, 2011	Mount Lemmon	Mount Lemmon Survey	·	1.4 km	MPC · JPL
889175	2011 KR_{18}	—	March 15, 2007	Mount Lemmon	Mount Lemmon Survey	·	790 m	MPC · JPL
889176	2011 KA_{52}	—	May 22, 2011	Mount Lemmon	Mount Lemmon Survey	H	340 m	MPC · JPL
889177	2011 KB_{54}	—	March 20, 2007	Kitt Peak	Spacewatch	NYS	830 m	MPC · JPL
889178	2011 LH_{9}	—	April 20, 2007	Kitt Peak	Spacewatch	·	1.2 km	MPC · JPL
889179	2011 LN_{18}	—	June 9, 2011	Mount Lemmon	Mount Lemmon Survey	H	360 m	MPC · JPL
889180	2011 LW_{33}	—	October 11, 2012	Haleakala	Pan-STARRS 1	·	470 m	MPC · JPL
889181	2011 LU_{34}	—	June 4, 2011	Mount Lemmon	Mount Lemmon Survey	·	1.2 km	MPC · JPL
889182	2011 MV_{3}	—	June 24, 2011	Kitt Peak	Spacewatch	·	2.2 km	MPC · JPL
889183	2011 NX_{1}	—	July 5, 2011	Haleakala	Pan-STARRS 1	H	420 m	MPC · JPL
889184	2011 NO_{6}	—	July 1, 2011	Kitt Peak	Spacewatch	·	490 m	MPC · JPL
889185	2011 NE_{7}	—	July 2, 2011	Mount Lemmon	Mount Lemmon Survey	·	1.4 km	MPC · JPL
889186	2011 OK_{5}	—	July 25, 2011	Haleakala	Pan-STARRS 1	AMO	210 m	MPC · JPL
889187	2011 OO_{20}	—	June 27, 2011	Kitt Peak	Spacewatch	·	370 m	MPC · JPL
889188	2011 OS_{67}	—	July 28, 2011	Haleakala	Pan-STARRS 1	·	470 m	MPC · JPL
889189	2011 OS_{71}	—	July 28, 2011	Haleakala	Pan-STARRS 1	·	1.2 km	MPC · JPL
889190	2011 OL_{73}	—	July 28, 2011	Haleakala	Pan-STARRS 1	HNS	690 m	MPC · JPL
889191	2011 OR_{77}	—	July 27, 2011	Haleakala	Pan-STARRS 1	·	390 m	MPC · JPL
889192	2011 OW_{77}	—	July 27, 2011	Haleakala	Pan-STARRS 1	MAR	730 m	MPC · JPL
889193	2011 PV_{5}	—	August 3, 2011	Haleakala	Pan-STARRS 1	H	360 m	MPC · JPL
889194	2011 PV_{14}	—	August 25, 2011	Siding Spring	SSS	H	420 m	MPC · JPL
889195	2011 PJ_{18}	—	August 2, 2011	Haleakala	Pan-STARRS 1	H	400 m	MPC · JPL
889196	2011 PP_{20}	—	August 2, 2011	Haleakala	Pan-STARRS 1	H	360 m	MPC · JPL
889197	2011 QQ_{2}	—	August 19, 2011	Haleakala	Pan-STARRS 1	H	430 m	MPC · JPL
889198	2011 QC_{3}	—	December 19, 2009	Mount Lemmon	Mount Lemmon Survey	H	360 m	MPC · JPL
889199	2011 QU_{4}	—	August 19, 2011	Haleakala	Pan-STARRS 1	H	320 m	MPC · JPL
889200	2011 QU_{16}	—	August 20, 2011	Haleakala	Pan-STARRS 1	·	550 m	MPC · JPL

== 889201–889300 ==
back to top

Designation			Discovery			Properties		Ref
Permanent	Provisional	Named after	Date	Site	Discoverer(s)	Category	Diam.	Ref
889201	2011 QK_{28}	—	August 4, 2011	Siding Spring	SSS	·	580 m	MPC · JPL
889202	2011 QM_{38}	—	March 4, 2005	Kitt Peak	Spacewatch	H	370 m	MPC · JPL
889203	2011 QG_{75}	—	October 26, 2008	Kitt Peak	Spacewatch	·	510 m	MPC · JPL
889204	2011 QP_{81}	—	August 24, 2011	Haleakala	Pan-STARRS 1	·	1.4 km	MPC · JPL
889205	2011 QD_{91}	—	July 27, 2011	Haleakala	Pan-STARRS 1	·	800 m	MPC · JPL
889206	2011 QQ_{97}	—	August 1, 2011	Haleakala	Pan-STARRS 1	·	490 m	MPC · JPL
889207	2011 QH_{109}	—	August 26, 2011	Kitt Peak	Spacewatch	EUN	720 m	MPC · JPL
889208	2011 QP_{109}	—	August 20, 2011	Haleakala	Pan-STARRS 1	·	640 m	MPC · JPL
889209	2011 QM_{114}	—	August 31, 2011	Haleakala	Pan-STARRS 1	AGN	770 m	MPC · JPL
889210	2011 QT_{116}	—	August 27, 2011	Haleakala	Pan-STARRS 1	·	1.0 km	MPC · JPL
889211	2011 RU_{4}	—	September 7, 2011	Kitt Peak	Spacewatch	·	460 m	MPC · JPL
889212	2011 RW_{23}	—	January 7, 2016	Haleakala	Pan-STARRS 1	·	450 m	MPC · JPL
889213	2011 RQ_{25}	—	September 4, 2011	Haleakala	Pan-STARRS 1	H	310 m	MPC · JPL
889214	2011 RU_{34}	—	September 2, 2011	Haleakala	Pan-STARRS 1	·	670 m	MPC · JPL
889215	2011 RR_{37}	—	September 4, 2011	Haleakala	Pan-STARRS 1	NYS	550 m	MPC · JPL
889216	2011 SZ_{5}	—	September 19, 2011	Haleakala	Pan-STARRS 1	H	370 m	MPC · JPL
889217	2011 SE_{10}	—	September 2, 2011	Haleakala	Pan-STARRS 1	H	330 m	MPC · JPL
889218	2011 SK_{14}	—	August 20, 2011	Haleakala	Pan-STARRS 1	EUN	700 m	MPC · JPL
889219	2011 SW_{27}	—	September 19, 2011	La Sagra	OAM	H	520 m	MPC · JPL
889220	2011 SQ_{35}	—	September 20, 2011	Kitt Peak	Spacewatch	H	460 m	MPC · JPL
889221	2011 SJ_{38}	—	September 20, 2011	Catalina	CSS	·	660 m	MPC · JPL
889222	2011 SH_{44}	—	September 18, 2011	Mount Lemmon	Mount Lemmon Survey	·	970 m	MPC · JPL
889223	2011 SG_{50}	—	September 18, 2011	Mount Lemmon	Mount Lemmon Survey	·	570 m	MPC · JPL
889224	2011 SE_{60}	—	August 31, 2011	Haleakala	Pan-STARRS 1	·	1.2 km	MPC · JPL
889225	2011 SY_{62}	—	September 21, 2011	Haleakala	Pan-STARRS 1	H	370 m	MPC · JPL
889226	2011 SF_{73}	—	September 4, 2011	Haleakala	Pan-STARRS 1	·	1.0 km	MPC · JPL
889227	2011 SG_{78}	—	September 20, 2011	Mount Lemmon	Mount Lemmon Survey	·	360 m	MPC · JPL
889228	2011 SM_{81}	—	September 20, 2011	Mount Lemmon	Mount Lemmon Survey	·	2.2 km	MPC · JPL
889229	2011 SA_{91}	—	September 22, 2011	Kitt Peak	Spacewatch	·	380 m	MPC · JPL
889230	2011 SR_{129}	—	September 20, 2011	Kitt Peak	Spacewatch	·	570 m	MPC · JPL
889231	2011 SP_{137}	—	September 4, 2011	Haleakala	Pan-STARRS 1	·	430 m	MPC · JPL
889232	2011 SK_{141}	—	September 23, 2011	Haleakala	Pan-STARRS 1	·	670 m	MPC · JPL
889233	2011 SP_{164}	—	September 23, 2011	Haleakala	Pan-STARRS 1	MAS	430 m	MPC · JPL
889234	2011 SP_{176}	—	September 21, 2011	Mount Lemmon	Mount Lemmon Survey	H	420 m	MPC · JPL
889235	2011 SH_{187}	—	September 29, 2011	Mount Lemmon	Mount Lemmon Survey	·	550 m	MPC · JPL
889236	2011 SO_{190}	—	September 29, 2011	Mount Lemmon	Mount Lemmon Survey	H	330 m	MPC · JPL
889237	2011 SH_{203}	—	September 19, 2011	Haleakala	Pan-STARRS 1	·	1.2 km	MPC · JPL
889238	2011 SA_{215}	—	September 21, 2011	Kitt Peak	Spacewatch	·	1.1 km	MPC · JPL
889239	2011 SS_{230}	—	September 28, 2011	Mount Lemmon	Mount Lemmon Survey	·	440 m	MPC · JPL
889240	2011 SX_{240}	—	September 26, 2011	Mount Lemmon	Mount Lemmon Survey	HNS	760 m	MPC · JPL
889241	2011 SJ_{242}	—	September 26, 2011	Mount Lemmon	Mount Lemmon Survey	·	910 m	MPC · JPL
889242	2011 SM_{262}	—	September 18, 2011	Mount Lemmon	Mount Lemmon Survey	H	370 m	MPC · JPL
889243	2011 SE_{270}	—	September 26, 2011	Mount Lemmon	Mount Lemmon Survey	·	1.2 km	MPC · JPL
889244	2011 SP_{285}	—	September 19, 2011	Mount Lemmon	Mount Lemmon Survey	·	520 m	MPC · JPL
889245	2011 SV_{287}	—	September 30, 2011	Kitt Peak	Spacewatch	MAS	530 m	MPC · JPL
889246	2011 SX_{287}	—	September 24, 2011	Haleakala	Pan-STARRS 1	·	620 m	MPC · JPL
889247	2011 SF_{289}	—	September 28, 2011	Kitt Peak	Spacewatch	MAS	460 m	MPC · JPL
889248	2011 SS_{292}	—	September 24, 2011	Haleakala	Pan-STARRS 1	·	640 m	MPC · JPL
889249	2011 SZ_{296}	—	March 18, 2018	Haleakala	Pan-STARRS 1	H	330 m	MPC · JPL
889250	2011 SQ_{298}	—	September 21, 2011	Haleakala	Pan-STARRS 1	H	320 m	MPC · JPL
889251	2011 SK_{300}	—	April 6, 2014	Mount Lemmon	Mount Lemmon Survey	EUN	820 m	MPC · JPL
889252	2011 SF_{304}	—	September 23, 2011	Haleakala	Pan-STARRS 1	·	440 m	MPC · JPL
889253	2011 SP_{305}	—	January 3, 2016	Haleakala	Pan-STARRS 1	·	470 m	MPC · JPL
889254	2011 SG_{311}	—	September 20, 2011	Mount Lemmon	Mount Lemmon Survey	·	2.2 km	MPC · JPL
889255	2011 SJ_{315}	—	February 13, 2008	Mount Lemmon	Mount Lemmon Survey	·	1.1 km	MPC · JPL
889256	2011 SA_{317}	—	September 26, 2011	Haleakala	Pan-STARRS 1	·	430 m	MPC · JPL
889257	2011 SQ_{318}	—	August 22, 2011	Charleston	International Astronomical Search Collaboration	·	1.1 km	MPC · JPL
889258	2011 SY_{322}	—	September 30, 2011	Kitt Peak	Spacewatch	·	1.0 km	MPC · JPL
889259	2011 SE_{325}	—	September 29, 2011	Mount Lemmon	Mount Lemmon Survey	·	990 m	MPC · JPL
889260	2011 SG_{325}	—	September 23, 2011	Kitt Peak	Spacewatch	·	1.1 km	MPC · JPL
889261	2011 SA_{328}	—	September 19, 2011	Haleakala	Pan-STARRS 1	·	490 m	MPC · JPL
889262	2011 SL_{329}	—	September 19, 2011	Haleakala	Pan-STARRS 1	·	590 m	MPC · JPL
889263	2011 SZ_{332}	—	September 21, 2011	Kitt Peak	Spacewatch	·	700 m	MPC · JPL
889264	2011 SM_{333}	—	September 20, 2011	Kitt Peak	Spacewatch	·	570 m	MPC · JPL
889265	2011 SD_{337}	—	September 28, 2011	Mount Lemmon	Mount Lemmon Survey	·	520 m	MPC · JPL
889266	2011 SZ_{338}	—	September 30, 2011	Kitt Peak	Spacewatch	TEL	850 m	MPC · JPL
889267	2011 SD_{341}	—	September 26, 2011	Haleakala	Pan-STARRS 1	KOR	950 m	MPC · JPL
889268	2011 SO_{342}	—	September 19, 2011	Haleakala	Pan-STARRS 1	·	590 m	MPC · JPL
889269	2011 SH_{364}	—	September 28, 2011	Mount Lemmon	Mount Lemmon Survey	·	930 m	MPC · JPL
889270	2011 SK_{367}	—	September 27, 2011	Mount Lemmon	Mount Lemmon Survey	·	1.2 km	MPC · JPL
889271	2011 TY_{22}	—	October 1, 2011	Kitt Peak	Spacewatch	·	480 m	MPC · JPL
889272	2011 UG_{13}	—	September 20, 2011	Mount Lemmon	Mount Lemmon Survey	·	1.0 km	MPC · JPL
889273	2011 UV_{65}	—	October 20, 2011	Mount Lemmon	Mount Lemmon Survey	·	900 m	MPC · JPL
889274	2011 UM_{77}	—	October 19, 2011	Kitt Peak	Spacewatch	V	450 m	MPC · JPL
889275	2011 UK_{78}	—	October 19, 2011	Kitt Peak	Spacewatch	V	440 m	MPC · JPL
889276	2011 UZ_{87}	—	October 21, 2011	Mount Lemmon	Mount Lemmon Survey	·	1.5 km	MPC · JPL
889277	2011 UR_{89}	—	October 27, 2006	Kitt Peak	Spacewatch	·	960 m	MPC · JPL
889278	2011 UF_{102}	—	October 20, 2011	Mount Lemmon	Mount Lemmon Survey	·	1.0 km	MPC · JPL
889279	2011 UF_{140}	—	October 23, 2011	Kitt Peak	Spacewatch	·	400 m	MPC · JPL
889280	2011 UF_{148}	—	September 23, 2011	Haleakala	Pan-STARRS 1	H	340 m	MPC · JPL
889281	2011 UE_{165}	—	October 26, 2011	Haleakala	Pan-STARRS 1	·	500 m	MPC · JPL
889282	2011 UZ_{165}	—	October 26, 2011	Haleakala	Pan-STARRS 1	DOR	1.4 km	MPC · JPL
889283	2011 UF_{191}	—	October 19, 2011	Mount Lemmon	Mount Lemmon Survey	·	530 m	MPC · JPL
889284	2011 UP_{199}	—	October 25, 2011	Haleakala	Pan-STARRS 1	·	720 m	MPC · JPL
889285	2011 UJ_{201}	—	October 25, 2011	Zelenchukskaya Stn	T. V. Krjačko, B. Satovski	·	1.3 km	MPC · JPL
889286	2011 UF_{219}	—	October 24, 2011	Mount Lemmon	Mount Lemmon Survey	·	1.3 km	MPC · JPL
889287	2011 UB_{223}	—	September 22, 2019	Haleakala	Pan-STARRS 1	·	930 m	MPC · JPL
889288	2011 UV_{224}	—	October 24, 2011	Mount Lemmon	Mount Lemmon Survey	MAS	450 m	MPC · JPL
889289	2011 UP_{226}	—	September 29, 2011	Kitt Peak	Spacewatch	·	440 m	MPC · JPL
889290	2011 UC_{236}	—	October 24, 2011	Haleakala	Pan-STARRS 1	·	1.4 km	MPC · JPL
889291	2011 UO_{253}	—	September 2, 2010	Mount Lemmon	Mount Lemmon Survey	3:2	3.5 km	MPC · JPL
889292	2011 UN_{256}	—	October 24, 2011	Kitt Peak	Spacewatch	·	1.0 km	MPC · JPL
889293	2011 UQ_{261}	—	October 25, 2011	Haleakala	Pan-STARRS 1	·	800 m	MPC · JPL
889294	2011 UJ_{265}	—	October 1, 2011	Kitt Peak	Spacewatch	·	530 m	MPC · JPL
889295	2011 UR_{269}	—	October 21, 2011	Kitt Peak	Spacewatch	·	490 m	MPC · JPL
889296	2011 UT_{277}	—	October 25, 2011	Haleakala	Pan-STARRS 1	·	470 m	MPC · JPL
889297	2011 UV_{287}	—	October 31, 2011	Mount Lemmon	Mount Lemmon Survey	·	810 m	MPC · JPL
889298	2011 UA_{301}	—	October 17, 2011	Kitt Peak	Spacewatch	·	390 m	MPC · JPL
889299	2011 US_{321}	—	October 31, 2011	Mayhill-ISON	L. Elenin	·	1.0 km	MPC · JPL
889300	2011 UD_{331}	—	October 24, 2011	Mount Lemmon	Mount Lemmon Survey	H	350 m	MPC · JPL

== 889301–889400 ==
back to top

Designation			Discovery			Properties		Ref
Permanent	Provisional	Named after	Date	Site	Discoverer(s)	Category	Diam.	Ref
889301	2011 UZ_{347}	—	October 19, 2011	Mount Lemmon	Mount Lemmon Survey	·	1.1 km	MPC · JPL
889302	2011 UE_{357}	—	October 20, 2011	Mount Lemmon	Mount Lemmon Survey	·	1.1 km	MPC · JPL
889303	2011 UM_{361}	—	September 30, 2011	Kitt Peak	Spacewatch	(13314)	1.3 km	MPC · JPL
889304	2011 UT_{370}	—	October 23, 2011	Mount Lemmon	Mount Lemmon Survey	·	1.3 km	MPC · JPL
889305	2011 UO_{372}	—	January 13, 2008	Kitt Peak	Spacewatch	·	940 m	MPC · JPL
889306	2011 UT_{374}	—	October 23, 2011	Haleakala	Pan-STARRS 1	H	360 m	MPC · JPL
889307	2011 UC_{380}	—	January 13, 2008	Mount Lemmon	Mount Lemmon Survey	·	1.1 km	MPC · JPL
889308	2011 UB_{394}	—	September 24, 2011	Haleakala	Pan-STARRS 1	·	680 m	MPC · JPL
889309	2011 UA_{404}	—	October 22, 2011	Kitt Peak	Spacewatch	·	490 m	MPC · JPL
889310	2011 UM_{407}	—	September 23, 2011	Charleston	International Astronomical Search Collaboration	·	460 m	MPC · JPL
889311	2011 UQ_{415}	—	October 17, 2011	Kitt Peak	Spacewatch	(11882)	1.3 km	MPC · JPL
889312	2011 UY_{422}	—	February 19, 2016	Haleakala	Pan-STARRS 1	·	500 m	MPC · JPL
889313	2011 UQ_{428}	—	October 24, 2011	Haleakala	Pan-STARRS 1	·	1.0 km	MPC · JPL
889314	2011 US_{428}	—	October 27, 2011	Mount Lemmon	Mount Lemmon Survey	·	940 m	MPC · JPL
889315	2011 UB_{429}	—	October 25, 2011	Haleakala	Pan-STARRS 1	·	630 m	MPC · JPL
889316	2011 UT_{429}	—	October 23, 2011	Haleakala	Pan-STARRS 1	·	1.2 km	MPC · JPL
889317	2011 UJ_{430}	—	October 24, 2011	Kitt Peak	Spacewatch	MAS	430 m	MPC · JPL
889318	2011 US_{431}	—	October 23, 2011	Haleakala	Pan-STARRS 1	·	1.1 km	MPC · JPL
889319	2011 UU_{431}	—	October 24, 2011	Haleakala	Pan-STARRS 1	MAS	360 m	MPC · JPL
889320	2011 UV_{432}	—	October 23, 2011	Haleakala	Pan-STARRS 1	·	960 m	MPC · JPL
889321	2011 UT_{437}	—	October 22, 2011	Kitt Peak	Spacewatch	·	640 m	MPC · JPL
889322	2011 UO_{442}	—	August 28, 2014	Haleakala	Pan-STARRS 1	·	470 m	MPC · JPL
889323	2011 UN_{444}	—	October 25, 2011	Haleakala	Pan-STARRS 1	·	1.1 km	MPC · JPL
889324	2011 UL_{445}	—	October 23, 2011	Kitt Peak	Spacewatch	3:2	3.4 km	MPC · JPL
889325	2011 UR_{449}	—	October 22, 2011	Mount Lemmon	Mount Lemmon Survey	NYS	700 m	MPC · JPL
889326	2011 UY_{451}	—	October 21, 2011	Kitt Peak	Spacewatch	·	520 m	MPC · JPL
889327	2011 UY_{454}	—	October 18, 2011	Mount Lemmon	Mount Lemmon Survey	·	1.1 km	MPC · JPL
889328	2011 UN_{456}	—	October 21, 2011	Kitt Peak	Spacewatch	·	400 m	MPC · JPL
889329	2011 UJ_{461}	—	October 25, 2011	Haleakala	Pan-STARRS 1	DOR	1.3 km	MPC · JPL
889330	2011 UA_{462}	—	October 24, 2011	Haleakala	Pan-STARRS 1	·	1.2 km	MPC · JPL
889331	2011 UO_{464}	—	October 26, 2011	Haleakala	Pan-STARRS 1	AEO	700 m	MPC · JPL
889332	2011 UC_{465}	—	October 23, 2011	Kitt Peak	Spacewatch	·	1.2 km	MPC · JPL
889333	2011 UP_{465}	—	October 31, 2011	Mount Lemmon	Mount Lemmon Survey	·	1.3 km	MPC · JPL
889334	2011 UV_{467}	—	October 24, 2011	Mount Lemmon	Mount Lemmon Survey	MRX	560 m	MPC · JPL
889335	2011 UB_{468}	—	October 23, 2011	Haleakala	Pan-STARRS 1	·	1.4 km	MPC · JPL
889336	2011 UE_{468}	—	October 26, 2011	Haleakala	Pan-STARRS 1	·	1.1 km	MPC · JPL
889337	2011 UU_{468}	—	October 23, 2011	Haleakala	Pan-STARRS 1	·	1.2 km	MPC · JPL
889338	2011 UY_{468}	—	October 20, 2011	Mount Lemmon	Mount Lemmon Survey	EUN	730 m	MPC · JPL
889339	2011 UG_{479}	—	October 24, 2011	Haleakala	Pan-STARRS 1	·	480 m	MPC · JPL
889340	2011 UZ_{480}	—	October 22, 2011	Kitt Peak	Spacewatch	MRX	630 m	MPC · JPL
889341	2011 UD_{498}	—	October 28, 2011	Mount Lemmon	Mount Lemmon Survey	H	360 m	MPC · JPL
889342	2011 UN_{506}	—	October 22, 2011	Mount Lemmon	Mount Lemmon Survey	·	1.1 km	MPC · JPL
889343	2011 VM_{7}	—	November 1, 2011	Mount Lemmon	Mount Lemmon Survey	·	1.1 km	MPC · JPL
889344	2011 VC_{26}	—	November 2, 2011	Kitt Peak	Spacewatch	·	560 m	MPC · JPL
889345	2011 VH_{27}	—	November 2, 2011	Mount Lemmon	Mount Lemmon Survey	·	810 m	MPC · JPL
889346	2011 VC_{31}	—	November 2, 2011	Mount Lemmon	Mount Lemmon Survey	·	1.1 km	MPC · JPL
889347	2011 VF_{31}	—	November 3, 2011	Mount Lemmon	Mount Lemmon Survey	·	920 m	MPC · JPL
889348	2011 VE_{33}	—	November 3, 2011	Kitt Peak	Spacewatch	HNS	690 m	MPC · JPL
889349	2011 VL_{33}	—	November 3, 2011	Kitt Peak	Spacewatch	·	1.2 km	MPC · JPL
889350	2011 VZ_{35}	—	November 15, 2011	Mount Lemmon	Mount Lemmon Survey	·	1.3 km	MPC · JPL
889351	2011 WB_{12}	—	October 19, 2011	Mount Lemmon	Mount Lemmon Survey	·	640 m	MPC · JPL
889352	2011 WV_{12}	—	October 3, 2011	Mount Lemmon	Mount Lemmon Survey	NYS	710 m	MPC · JPL
889353	2011 WZ_{27}	—	November 19, 2011	Mount Lemmon	Mount Lemmon Survey	·	1.2 km	MPC · JPL
889354	2011 WF_{38}	—	October 25, 2011	Haleakala	Pan-STARRS 1	·	1.2 km	MPC · JPL
889355	2011 WE_{40}	—	November 17, 2011	Mount Lemmon	Mount Lemmon Survey	·	800 m	MPC · JPL
889356	2011 WY_{44}	—	November 23, 2011	Mount Lemmon	Mount Lemmon Survey	·	520 m	MPC · JPL
889357	2011 WK_{55}	—	January 18, 2008	Mount Lemmon	Mount Lemmon Survey	·	1.0 km	MPC · JPL
889358	2011 WF_{57}	—	November 3, 2011	Kitt Peak	Spacewatch	·	1.2 km	MPC · JPL
889359	2011 WQ_{109}	—	October 31, 2011	Kitt Peak	Spacewatch	·	680 m	MPC · JPL
889360	2011 WY_{138}	—	November 17, 2011	Mount Lemmon	Mount Lemmon Survey	·	1.7 km	MPC · JPL
889361	2011 WA_{148}	—	October 31, 2011	Kitt Peak	Spacewatch	·	410 m	MPC · JPL
889362	2011 WZ_{158}	—	November 24, 2011	Mount Lemmon	Mount Lemmon Survey	·	530 m	MPC · JPL
889363	2011 WO_{161}	—	November 30, 2011	Mount Lemmon	Mount Lemmon Survey	·	1.3 km	MPC · JPL
889364	2011 WY_{162}	—	November 18, 2011	Mount Lemmon	Mount Lemmon Survey	·	1.2 km	MPC · JPL
889365	2011 WB_{164}	—	November 16, 2011	Mount Lemmon	Mount Lemmon Survey	·	1.2 km	MPC · JPL
889366	2011 WP_{164}	—	November 17, 2011	Mount Lemmon	Mount Lemmon Survey	·	1.2 km	MPC · JPL
889367	2011 WS_{164}	—	November 27, 2011	Mount Lemmon	Mount Lemmon Survey	PHO	530 m	MPC · JPL
889368	2011 WD_{166}	—	November 17, 2011	Mount Lemmon	Mount Lemmon Survey	·	1.2 km	MPC · JPL
889369	2011 WE_{169}	—	November 17, 2011	Mount Lemmon	Mount Lemmon Survey	NYS	680 m	MPC · JPL
889370	2011 WS_{169}	—	November 18, 2011	Mount Lemmon	Mount Lemmon Survey	·	500 m	MPC · JPL
889371	2011 WK_{170}	—	November 24, 2011	Mount Lemmon	Mount Lemmon Survey	·	1.2 km	MPC · JPL
889372	2011 WB_{172}	—	May 28, 2014	Haleakala	Pan-STARRS 1	·	960 m	MPC · JPL
889373	2011 WE_{173}	—	December 14, 2015	Haleakala	Pan-STARRS 1	·	840 m	MPC · JPL
889374	2011 WA_{176}	—	September 14, 2007	Mount Lemmon	Mount Lemmon Survey	·	780 m	MPC · JPL
889375	2011 WX_{178}	—	November 28, 2011	Kitt Peak	Spacewatch	·	1.1 km	MPC · JPL
889376	2011 WY_{180}	—	November 16, 2011	Mount Lemmon	Mount Lemmon Survey	·	550 m	MPC · JPL
889377	2011 WG_{183}	—	November 17, 2011	Mount Lemmon	Mount Lemmon Survey	·	600 m	MPC · JPL
889378	2011 WH_{183}	—	November 16, 2011	Mount Lemmon	Mount Lemmon Survey	·	1.1 km	MPC · JPL
889379	2011 WV_{183}	—	November 24, 2011	Mount Lemmon	Mount Lemmon Survey	·	370 m	MPC · JPL
889380	2011 WK_{184}	—	November 22, 2011	Mount Lemmon	Mount Lemmon Survey	·	1.2 km	MPC · JPL
889381	2011 WP_{188}	—	November 23, 2011	Mount Lemmon	Mount Lemmon Survey	·	440 m	MPC · JPL
889382	2011 XM_{5}	—	December 6, 2011	Haleakala	Pan-STARRS 1	·	1.4 km	MPC · JPL
889383	2011 XU_{6}	—	December 1, 2011	Haleakala	Pan-STARRS 1	AEO	700 m	MPC · JPL
889384	2011 YN_{18}	—	November 30, 2011	Kitt Peak	Spacewatch	·	500 m	MPC · JPL
889385	2011 YZ_{30}	—	November 28, 2011	Mount Lemmon	Mount Lemmon Survey	PAL	1.1 km	MPC · JPL
889386	2011 YK_{40}	—	October 20, 2011	Mount Lemmon	Mount Lemmon Survey	·	500 m	MPC · JPL
889387	2011 YN_{42}	—	December 26, 2011	Mount Lemmon	Mount Lemmon Survey	·	2.1 km	MPC · JPL
889388	2011 YA_{51}	—	December 30, 2011	Mount Lemmon	Mount Lemmon Survey	·	460 m	MPC · JPL
889389	2011 YN_{61}	—	October 21, 2006	Kitt Peak	Spacewatch	·	1.2 km	MPC · JPL
889390	2011 YB_{72}	—	December 27, 2011	Mount Lemmon	Mount Lemmon Survey	·	470 m	MPC · JPL
889391	2011 YO_{78}	—	December 27, 2011	Kitt Peak	Spacewatch	·	1.3 km	MPC · JPL
889392	2011 YP_{86}	—	December 29, 2011	Kitt Peak	Spacewatch	·	1.4 km	MPC · JPL
889393	2011 YM_{87}	—	December 13, 2017	Haleakala	Pan-STARRS 1	TIR	1.8 km	MPC · JPL
889394	2011 YG_{88}	—	December 29, 2011	Mount Lemmon	Mount Lemmon Survey	·	390 m	MPC · JPL
889395	2011 YJ_{88}	—	December 29, 2011	Mount Lemmon	Mount Lemmon Survey	·	440 m	MPC · JPL
889396	2011 YK_{88}	—	December 28, 2011	Mount Lemmon	Mount Lemmon Survey	PHO	560 m	MPC · JPL
889397	2011 YN_{88}	—	December 31, 2011	Catalina	CSS	·	590 m	MPC · JPL
889398	2011 YM_{90}	—	December 27, 2011	Mount Lemmon	Mount Lemmon Survey	L4	5.3 km	MPC · JPL
889399	2011 YO_{90}	—	December 31, 2011	Mount Lemmon	Mount Lemmon Survey	·	690 m	MPC · JPL
889400	2011 YH_{92}	—	December 27, 2011	Kitt Peak	Spacewatch	·	430 m	MPC · JPL

== 889401–889500 ==
back to top

Designation			Discovery			Properties		Ref
Permanent	Provisional	Named after	Date	Site	Discoverer(s)	Category	Diam.	Ref
889401	2011 YF_{93}	—	December 26, 2011	Kitt Peak	Spacewatch	·	1.4 km	MPC · JPL
889402	2011 YX_{93}	—	December 26, 2011	Mount Lemmon	Mount Lemmon Survey	·	1.2 km	MPC · JPL
889403	2011 YU_{94}	—	December 29, 2011	Mount Lemmon	Mount Lemmon Survey	V	370 m	MPC · JPL
889404	2011 YL_{96}	—	December 29, 2011	Catalina	CSS	·	490 m	MPC · JPL
889405	2011 YP_{96}	—	December 30, 2011	Kitt Peak	Spacewatch	·	650 m	MPC · JPL
889406	2011 YK_{98}	—	December 27, 2011	Mount Lemmon	Mount Lemmon Survey	·	1.4 km	MPC · JPL
889407	2012 AG	—	January 1, 2012	Mount Lemmon	Mount Lemmon Survey	AGN	870 m	MPC · JPL
889408	2012 AP_{9}	—	January 2, 2012	Kitt Peak	Spacewatch	·	1.2 km	MPC · JPL
889409	2012 AH_{27}	—	July 25, 2014	Haleakala	Pan-STARRS 1	·	620 m	MPC · JPL
889410	2012 AQ_{29}	—	September 19, 2014	Haleakala	Pan-STARRS 1	·	540 m	MPC · JPL
889411	2012 AF_{30}	—	January 2, 2012	Mount Lemmon	Mount Lemmon Survey	LIX	2.2 km	MPC · JPL
889412	2012 AB_{31}	—	January 2, 2012	Kitt Peak	Spacewatch	NYS	720 m	MPC · JPL
889413	2012 AO_{34}	—	January 2, 2012	Mount Lemmon	Mount Lemmon Survey	H	310 m	MPC · JPL
889414	2012 AS_{35}	—	January 2, 2012	Kitt Peak	Spacewatch	·	2.0 km	MPC · JPL
889415	2012 AG_{37}	—	January 2, 2012	Kitt Peak	Spacewatch	NYS	470 m	MPC · JPL
889416	2012 AB_{39}	—	January 2, 2012	Mount Lemmon	Mount Lemmon Survey	·	1.4 km	MPC · JPL
889417	2012 BA	—	January 4, 2012	Kitt Peak	Spacewatch	PHO	680 m	MPC · JPL
889418	2012 BV_{6}	—	December 30, 2011	Kitt Peak	Spacewatch	·	430 m	MPC · JPL
889419	2012 BY_{18}	—	January 19, 2012	Haleakala	Pan-STARRS 1	·	500 m	MPC · JPL
889420	2012 BJ_{29}	—	January 1, 2012	Mount Lemmon	Mount Lemmon Survey	·	1.1 km	MPC · JPL
889421	2012 BY_{45}	—	December 29, 2011	Kitt Peak	Spacewatch	·	440 m	MPC · JPL
889422	2012 BQ_{49}	—	January 2, 2012	Kitt Peak	Spacewatch	·	450 m	MPC · JPL
889423	2012 BU_{49}	—	February 27, 2009	Mount Lemmon	Mount Lemmon Survey	·	450 m	MPC · JPL
889424	2012 BN_{51}	—	January 21, 2012	Kitt Peak	Spacewatch	·	430 m	MPC · JPL
889425	2012 BO_{57}	—	January 18, 2012	Mount Lemmon	Mount Lemmon Survey	THB	1.8 km	MPC · JPL
889426	2012 BF_{58}	—	January 18, 2012	Mount Lemmon	Mount Lemmon Survey	·	1.5 km	MPC · JPL
889427	2012 BC_{68}	—	January 21, 2012	Kitt Peak	Spacewatch	·	1.2 km	MPC · JPL
889428	2012 BT_{77}	—	December 27, 2011	Kitt Peak	Spacewatch	NYS	620 m	MPC · JPL
889429	2012 BD_{101}	—	January 19, 2012	Haleakala	Pan-STARRS 1	·	1.4 km	MPC · JPL
889430	2012 BQ_{103}	—	January 19, 2012	Haleakala	Pan-STARRS 1	PHO	630 m	MPC · JPL
889431	2012 BC_{107}	—	January 26, 2012	Mount Lemmon	Mount Lemmon Survey	·	610 m	MPC · JPL
889432	2012 BN_{107}	—	January 18, 2012	Bergisch Gladbach	W. Bickel	·	1.9 km	MPC · JPL
889433	2012 BU_{110}	—	January 27, 2012	Kitt Peak	Spacewatch	THB	2.0 km	MPC · JPL
889434	2012 BC_{126}	—	January 21, 2012	Kitt Peak	Spacewatch	·	560 m	MPC · JPL
889435	2012 BM_{136}	—	January 20, 2012	Mount Lemmon	Mount Lemmon Survey	PHO	550 m	MPC · JPL
889436	2012 BE_{139}	—	January 19, 2012	Kitt Peak	Spacewatch	·	1.4 km	MPC · JPL
889437	2012 BA_{146}	—	January 27, 2012	Mount Lemmon	Mount Lemmon Survey	·	470 m	MPC · JPL
889438	2012 BH_{162}	—	January 20, 2012	Kitt Peak	Spacewatch	·	530 m	MPC · JPL
889439	2012 BM_{164}	—	January 20, 2012	Kitt Peak	Spacewatch	·	1.5 km	MPC · JPL
889440	2012 BZ_{165}	—	January 20, 2012	Kitt Peak	Spacewatch	H	350 m	MPC · JPL
889441	2012 BQ_{173}	—	January 20, 2012	Mount Lemmon	Mount Lemmon Survey	AEO	750 m	MPC · JPL
889442	2012 BZ_{174}	—	January 19, 2012	Haleakala	Pan-STARRS 1	·	550 m	MPC · JPL
889443	2012 BE_{178}	—	January 19, 2012	Haleakala	Pan-STARRS 1	·	590 m	MPC · JPL
889444	2012 BT_{179}	—	January 18, 2012	Kitt Peak	Spacewatch	·	1.7 km	MPC · JPL
889445	2012 BC_{183}	—	January 20, 2012	Kitt Peak	Spacewatch	·	1.2 km	MPC · JPL
889446	2012 BD_{183}	—	January 22, 2012	Haleakala	Pan-STARRS 1	·	1.5 km	MPC · JPL
889447	2012 BY_{183}	—	January 17, 2012	Bergisch Gladbach	W. Bickel	·	440 m	MPC · JPL
889448	2012 BS_{184}	—	October 19, 2007	Mount Lemmon	Mount Lemmon Survey	·	570 m	MPC · JPL
889449	2012 BD_{187}	—	January 29, 2012	Kitt Peak	Spacewatch	LIX	2.5 km	MPC · JPL
889450	2012 BO_{187}	—	January 26, 2012	Haleakala	Pan-STARRS 1	·	1.3 km	MPC · JPL
889451	2012 BA_{189}	—	April 18, 2009	Mount Lemmon	Mount Lemmon Survey	·	430 m	MPC · JPL
889452	2012 BE_{191}	—	January 19, 2012	Haleakala	Pan-STARRS 1	·	620 m	MPC · JPL
889453	2012 BG_{191}	—	January 27, 2012	Mount Lemmon	Mount Lemmon Survey	·	500 m	MPC · JPL
889454	2012 BO_{191}	—	January 19, 2012	Haleakala	Pan-STARRS 1	GEF	870 m	MPC · JPL
889455	2012 BB_{193}	—	January 29, 2012	Mount Lemmon	Mount Lemmon Survey	·	1.1 km	MPC · JPL
889456	2012 CZ	—	February 1, 2012	Kitt Peak	Spacewatch	·	510 m	MPC · JPL
889457	2012 CS_{2}	—	February 1, 2012	Kitt Peak	Spacewatch	·	560 m	MPC · JPL
889458	2012 CR_{13}	—	February 3, 2012	Haleakala	Pan-STARRS 1	H	350 m	MPC · JPL
889459	2012 CM_{27}	—	January 26, 2012	Haleakala	Pan-STARRS 1	·	2.3 km	MPC · JPL
889460	2012 CE_{31}	—	January 21, 2012	Kitt Peak	Spacewatch	(13314)	1.1 km	MPC · JPL
889461	2012 CQ_{37}	—	February 1, 2012	Kitt Peak	Spacewatch	·	1.3 km	MPC · JPL
889462	2012 CZ_{46}	—	December 26, 2011	Mount Lemmon	Mount Lemmon Survey	·	1.5 km	MPC · JPL
889463	2012 CR_{48}	—	February 13, 2012	Haleakala	Pan-STARRS 1	·	1.5 km	MPC · JPL
889464	2012 CH_{49}	—	January 30, 2012	Mount Lemmon	Mount Lemmon Survey	·	530 m	MPC · JPL
889465	2012 CG_{59}	—	February 3, 2012	Haleakala	Pan-STARRS 1	·	730 m	MPC · JPL
889466	2012 CL_{59}	—	February 3, 2012	Haleakala	Pan-STARRS 1	·	2.1 km	MPC · JPL
889467	2012 CU_{63}	—	February 13, 2012	Haleakala	Pan-STARRS 1	H	260 m	MPC · JPL
889468	2012 CE_{64}	—	February 1, 2012	Kitt Peak	Spacewatch	·	480 m	MPC · JPL
889469	2012 CK_{64}	—	February 3, 2012	Haleakala	Pan-STARRS 1	·	490 m	MPC · JPL
889470	2012 CC_{65}	—	February 3, 2012	Haleakala	Pan-STARRS 1	(1338) (FLO)	350 m	MPC · JPL
889471	2012 CN_{69}	—	February 3, 2012	Haleakala	Pan-STARRS 1	·	1.2 km	MPC · JPL
889472	2012 CJ_{73}	—	February 1, 2012	Mount Lemmon	Mount Lemmon Survey	·	1.3 km	MPC · JPL
889473	2012 DG_{2}	—	January 29, 2012	Kitt Peak	Spacewatch	·	1.2 km	MPC · JPL
889474	2012 DB_{3}	—	February 16, 2012	Haleakala	Pan-STARRS 1	·	540 m	MPC · JPL
889475	2012 DE_{10}	—	February 16, 2012	Haleakala	Pan-STARRS 1	·	510 m	MPC · JPL
889476	2012 DM_{21}	—	February 19, 2012	Kitt Peak	Spacewatch	·	680 m	MPC · JPL
889477	2012 DH_{51}	—	January 18, 2012	Mount Lemmon	Mount Lemmon Survey	·	1.6 km	MPC · JPL
889478	2012 DW_{51}	—	January 19, 2012	Haleakala	Pan-STARRS 1	MAS	480 m	MPC · JPL
889479	2012 DN_{54}	—	February 26, 2012	Haleakala	Pan-STARRS 1	·	400 m	MPC · JPL
889480	2012 DK_{66}	—	February 23, 2012	Mount Lemmon	Mount Lemmon Survey	THM	1.6 km	MPC · JPL
889481	2012 DJ_{72}	—	February 25, 2012	Catalina	CSS	·	1.9 km	MPC · JPL
889482	2012 DU_{73}	—	February 16, 2012	Haleakala	Pan-STARRS 1	GEF	880 m	MPC · JPL
889483	2012 DN_{82}	—	February 21, 2012	Kitt Peak	Spacewatch	·	670 m	MPC · JPL
889484	2012 DG_{87}	—	February 16, 2012	Haleakala	Pan-STARRS 1	·	530 m	MPC · JPL
889485	2012 DO_{93}	—	January 19, 2012	Haleakala	Pan-STARRS 1	·	500 m	MPC · JPL
889486	2012 DF_{103}	—	January 27, 2012	Kitt Peak	Spacewatch	·	1.3 km	MPC · JPL
889487	2012 DE_{109}	—	August 15, 2013	Haleakala	Pan-STARRS 1	H	310 m	MPC · JPL
889488	2012 DQ_{109}	—	February 25, 2012	Kitt Peak	Spacewatch	·	630 m	MPC · JPL
889489	2012 DJ_{110}	—	February 16, 2012	Haleakala	Pan-STARRS 1	·	1.8 km	MPC · JPL
889490	2012 DZ_{111}	—	February 21, 2012	Kitt Peak	Spacewatch	·	560 m	MPC · JPL
889491	2012 DP_{113}	—	February 27, 2012	Haleakala	Pan-STARRS 1	·	750 m	MPC · JPL
889492	2012 DU_{113}	—	February 28, 2012	Haleakala	Pan-STARRS 1	·	560 m	MPC · JPL
889493	2012 DS_{114}	—	February 27, 2012	Haleakala	Pan-STARRS 1	·	610 m	MPC · JPL
889494	2012 DA_{116}	—	February 27, 2012	Haleakala	Pan-STARRS 1	AGN	820 m	MPC · JPL
889495	2012 DG_{116}	—	February 28, 2012	Charleston	International Astronomical Search Collaboration	·	1.1 km	MPC · JPL
889496	2012 DA_{117}	—	February 28, 2012	Haleakala	Pan-STARRS 1	·	560 m	MPC · JPL
889497	2012 DB_{120}	—	January 25, 2012	Kitt Peak	Spacewatch	·	670 m	MPC · JPL
889498	2012 DJ_{120}	—	February 26, 2012	Haleakala	Pan-STARRS 1	·	690 m	MPC · JPL
889499	2012 DN_{120}	—	February 16, 2012	Haleakala	Pan-STARRS 1	·	470 m	MPC · JPL
889500	2012 DC_{121}	—	February 27, 2012	Kitt Peak	Spacewatch	·	400 m	MPC · JPL

== 889501–889600 ==
back to top

Designation			Discovery			Properties		Ref
Permanent	Provisional	Named after	Date	Site	Discoverer(s)	Category	Diam.	Ref
889501	2012 DM_{121}	—	February 16, 2012	Haleakala	Pan-STARRS 1	·	2.0 km	MPC · JPL
889502	2012 DG_{124}	—	February 27, 2012	Haleakala	Pan-STARRS 1	·	1.5 km	MPC · JPL
889503	2012 DH_{124}	—	February 25, 2012	Kitt Peak	Spacewatch	·	1.8 km	MPC · JPL
889504	2012 DU_{124}	—	February 28, 2012	Haleakala	Pan-STARRS 1	·	1.4 km	MPC · JPL
889505	2012 DW_{124}	—	February 27, 2012	Kitt Peak	Spacewatch	·	670 m	MPC · JPL
889506	2012 DC_{125}	—	February 27, 2012	Haleakala	Pan-STARRS 1	·	600 m	MPC · JPL
889507	2012 DH_{125}	—	February 27, 2012	Kitt Peak	Spacewatch	ERI	870 m	MPC · JPL
889508	2012 DC_{126}	—	February 21, 2012	Kitt Peak	Spacewatch	NYS	760 m	MPC · JPL
889509	2012 DJ_{126}	—	February 22, 2012	Charleston	International Astronomical Search Collaboration	·	690 m	MPC · JPL
889510	2012 DV_{130}	—	February 16, 2012	Haleakala	Pan-STARRS 1	H	420 m	MPC · JPL
889511	2012 DE_{131}	—	February 28, 2012	Haleakala	Pan-STARRS 1	·	2.0 km	MPC · JPL
889512	2012 DP_{132}	—	February 23, 2012	Mount Lemmon	Mount Lemmon Survey	·	770 m	MPC · JPL
889513	2012 DR_{133}	—	February 25, 2007	Mount Lemmon	Mount Lemmon Survey	·	1.2 km	MPC · JPL
889514	2012 DJ_{135}	—	February 28, 2012	Haleakala	Pan-STARRS 1	·	610 m	MPC · JPL
889515	2012 EA_{9}	—	March 13, 2012	Haleakala	Pan-STARRS 1	·	1.9 km	MPC · JPL
889516	2012 ET_{22}	—	March 15, 2012	Kitt Peak	Spacewatch	·	490 m	MPC · JPL
889517	2012 EX_{24}	—	March 4, 2012	Mount Lemmon	Mount Lemmon Survey	NYS	650 m	MPC · JPL
889518	2012 EY_{24}	—	March 1, 2012	Mount Lemmon	Mount Lemmon Survey	·	670 m	MPC · JPL
889519	2012 EB_{26}	—	March 2, 2012	Mount Lemmon	Mount Lemmon Survey	·	660 m	MPC · JPL
889520	2012 EL_{29}	—	March 15, 2012	Mount Lemmon	Mount Lemmon Survey	DOR	1.4 km	MPC · JPL
889521	2012 EF_{30}	—	March 14, 2012	Mount Lemmon	Mount Lemmon Survey	H	340 m	MPC · JPL
889522	2012 EG_{31}	—	March 4, 2005	Mount Lemmon	Mount Lemmon Survey	·	420 m	MPC · JPL
889523	2012 EL_{31}	—	March 15, 2012	Mount Lemmon	Mount Lemmon Survey	V	490 m	MPC · JPL
889524	2012 EZ_{31}	—	March 14, 2012	Haleakala	Pan-STARRS 1	H	360 m	MPC · JPL
889525	2012 FZ_{15}	—	March 12, 2012	Kitt Peak	Spacewatch	·	620 m	MPC · JPL
889526	2012 FB_{16}	—	March 17, 2012	Mount Lemmon	Mount Lemmon Survey	·	610 m	MPC · JPL
889527	2012 FE_{16}	—	March 16, 2012	Kitt Peak	Spacewatch	·	450 m	MPC · JPL
889528	2012 FT_{16}	—	March 17, 2012	Mount Lemmon	Mount Lemmon Survey	·	1.3 km	MPC · JPL
889529	2012 FF_{22}	—	March 11, 2005	Kitt Peak	Spacewatch	·	580 m	MPC · JPL
889530	2012 FN_{43}	—	March 25, 2012	Mount Lemmon	Mount Lemmon Survey	H	350 m	MPC · JPL
889531	2012 FP_{45}	—	April 1, 2005	Kitt Peak	Spacewatch	·	560 m	MPC · JPL
889532	2012 FV_{65}	—	February 1, 2012	Mount Lemmon	Mount Lemmon Survey	·	550 m	MPC · JPL
889533	2012 FT_{69}	—	March 25, 2012	Kitt Peak	Spacewatch	PHO	730 m	MPC · JPL
889534	2012 FY_{84}	—	March 17, 2012	Kitt Peak	Spacewatch	·	740 m	MPC · JPL
889535	2012 FS_{89}	—	March 16, 2012	Haleakala	Pan-STARRS 1	·	1.5 km	MPC · JPL
889536	2012 FO_{91}	—	November 27, 2014	Haleakala	Pan-STARRS 1	V	430 m	MPC · JPL
889537	2012 FV_{91}	—	November 20, 2014	Haleakala	Pan-STARRS 1	·	630 m	MPC · JPL
889538	2012 FZ_{94}	—	March 29, 2012	Kitt Peak	Spacewatch	·	660 m	MPC · JPL
889539	2012 FP_{95}	—	March 20, 2012	Haleakala	Pan-STARRS 1	PHO	630 m	MPC · JPL
889540	2012 FQ_{95}	—	March 29, 2012	Mount Lemmon	Mount Lemmon Survey	·	600 m	MPC · JPL
889541	2012 FS_{95}	—	March 16, 2012	Mount Lemmon	Mount Lemmon Survey	·	700 m	MPC · JPL
889542	2012 FX_{95}	—	March 27, 2012	Kitt Peak	Spacewatch	NYS	660 m	MPC · JPL
889543	2012 FB_{97}	—	March 28, 2012	Mount Lemmon	Mount Lemmon Survey	·	610 m	MPC · JPL
889544	2012 FH_{100}	—	March 17, 2012	Mount Lemmon	Mount Lemmon Survey	·	2.3 km	MPC · JPL
889545	2012 FS_{102}	—	March 16, 2012	Mount Lemmon	Mount Lemmon Survey	·	600 m	MPC · JPL
889546	2012 FD_{106}	—	March 28, 2012	Haleakala	Pan-STARRS 1	·	1.3 km	MPC · JPL
889547	2012 FU_{110}	—	March 16, 2012	Haleakala	Pan-STARRS 1	·	1.6 km	MPC · JPL
889548	2012 FG_{111}	—	November 11, 2007	Mount Lemmon	Mount Lemmon Survey	·	670 m	MPC · JPL
889549	2012 FM_{111}	—	March 25, 2012	Mount Lemmon	Mount Lemmon Survey	·	710 m	MPC · JPL
889550	2012 FK_{115}	—	January 26, 2006	Mount Lemmon	Mount Lemmon Survey	THM	1.8 km	MPC · JPL
889551	2012 GT	—	March 14, 2012	Haleakala	Pan-STARRS 1	·	250 m	MPC · JPL
889552	2012 GF_{6}	—	March 27, 2012	Kitt Peak	Spacewatch	·	1.6 km	MPC · JPL
889553	2012 GY_{41}	—	September 1, 2013	Catalina	CSS	·	1.4 km	MPC · JPL
889554	2012 GT_{49}	—	April 15, 2012	Haleakala	Pan-STARRS 1	·	880 m	MPC · JPL
889555	2012 GL_{55}	—	April 1, 2012	Mount Lemmon	Mount Lemmon Survey	·	1.4 km	MPC · JPL
889556	2012 HR_{1}	—	March 27, 2012	Kitt Peak	Spacewatch	(5)	690 m	MPC · JPL
889557	2012 HE_{3}	—	April 16, 2012	Kitt Peak	Spacewatch	PHO	620 m	MPC · JPL
889558	2012 HE_{11}	—	April 14, 2012	Haleakala	Pan-STARRS 1	PHO	660 m	MPC · JPL
889559	2012 HT_{18}	—	April 15, 2012	Haleakala	Pan-STARRS 1	·	660 m	MPC · JPL
889560	2012 HL_{32}	—	April 17, 2005	Kitt Peak	Spacewatch	·	460 m	MPC · JPL
889561	2012 HP_{37}	—	April 15, 2012	Haleakala	Pan-STARRS 1	·	700 m	MPC · JPL
889562	2012 HZ_{76}	—	March 15, 2012	Mount Lemmon	Mount Lemmon Survey	·	430 m	MPC · JPL
889563	2012 HW_{86}	—	April 24, 2012	Mount Lemmon	Mount Lemmon Survey	·	1.5 km	MPC · JPL
889564	2012 HG_{90}	—	April 16, 2012	Haleakala	Pan-STARRS 1	·	650 m	MPC · JPL
889565	2012 HA_{95}	—	March 15, 2012	Kitt Peak	Spacewatch	·	570 m	MPC · JPL
889566	2012 HH_{95}	—	March 26, 2001	Kitt Peak	Spacewatch	NYS	710 m	MPC · JPL
889567	2012 HG_{106}	—	April 20, 2012	Mount Lemmon	Mount Lemmon Survey	·	1.6 km	MPC · JPL
889568	2012 HH_{108}	—	April 28, 2012	Mount Lemmon	Mount Lemmon Survey	·	750 m	MPC · JPL
889569	2012 HT_{113}	—	April 20, 2012	Mount Lemmon	Mount Lemmon Survey	·	780 m	MPC · JPL
889570	2012 JU_{27}	—	April 21, 2012	Haleakala	Pan-STARRS 1	·	1.2 km	MPC · JPL
889571	2012 JA_{33}	—	February 28, 2008	Mount Lemmon	Mount Lemmon Survey	·	780 m	MPC · JPL
889572	2012 JE_{40}	—	April 21, 2012	Kitt Peak	Spacewatch	·	1.1 km	MPC · JPL
889573	2012 JE_{62}	—	May 14, 2012	Haleakala	Pan-STARRS 1	·	700 m	MPC · JPL
889574	2012 JF_{69}	—	May 1, 2012	Mount Lemmon	Mount Lemmon Survey	ERI	980 m	MPC · JPL
889575	2012 JG_{69}	—	May 1, 2012	Mount Lemmon	Mount Lemmon Survey	·	860 m	MPC · JPL
889576	2012 JE_{72}	—	May 13, 2012	Mount Lemmon	Mount Lemmon Survey	MAS	500 m	MPC · JPL
889577	2012 JF_{72}	—	May 14, 2012	Haleakala	Pan-STARRS 1	·	800 m	MPC · JPL
889578	2012 KE_{4}	—	May 18, 2012	Haleakala	Pan-STARRS 1	·	630 m	MPC · JPL
889579	2012 KJ_{6}	—	May 16, 2012	Haleakala	Pan-STARRS 1	T_{j} (2.95)	3.1 km	MPC · JPL
889580	2012 KY_{21}	—	May 17, 2012	Mount Lemmon	Mount Lemmon Survey	·	1.3 km	MPC · JPL
889581	2012 KV_{43}	—	May 1, 2012	Mount Lemmon	Mount Lemmon Survey	·	1.5 km	MPC · JPL
889582	2012 KB_{45}	—	May 29, 2012	Mount Lemmon	Mount Lemmon Survey	H	340 m	MPC · JPL
889583	2012 KA_{57}	—	January 15, 2008	Catalina	CSS	PHO	700 m	MPC · JPL
889584	2012 KL_{58}	—	May 16, 2012	Mount Lemmon	Mount Lemmon Survey	·	540 m	MPC · JPL
889585	2012 LA_{4}	—	June 12, 2012	Haleakala	Pan-STARRS 1	H	370 m	MPC · JPL
889586	2012 LO_{5}	—	June 13, 2012	Haleakala	Pan-STARRS 1	H	300 m	MPC · JPL
889587	2012 LG_{14}	—	June 15, 2012	Kitt Peak	Spacewatch	PHO	580 m	MPC · JPL
889588	2012 LO_{23}	—	June 14, 2012	Mount Lemmon	Mount Lemmon Survey	·	910 m	MPC · JPL
889589	2012 PK	—	December 28, 2005	Mount Lemmon	Mount Lemmon Survey	H	440 m	MPC · JPL
889590	2012 PN_{15}	—	August 23, 2008	Siding Spring	SSS	·	950 m	MPC · JPL
889591	2012 PX_{51}	—	August 11, 2012	Haleakala	Pan-STARRS 1	H	370 m	MPC · JPL
889592	2012 PE_{53}	—	August 13, 2018	Haleakala	Pan-STARRS 1	·	1.8 km	MPC · JPL
889593	2012 PG_{59}	—	August 13, 2012	Haleakala	Pan-STARRS 1	·	2.1 km	MPC · JPL
889594	2012 QM	—	August 16, 2012	\v{C}rni Vrh	Vales, J.	·	1.1 km	MPC · JPL
889595	2012 QO_{32}	—	August 25, 2012	Kitt Peak	Spacewatch	·	1.1 km	MPC · JPL
889596	2012 QU_{45}	—	August 18, 2012	ESA OGS	ESA OGS	·	1.9 km	MPC · JPL
889597	2012 QQ_{56}	—	August 26, 2012	Kitt Peak	Spacewatch	·	1.2 km	MPC · JPL
889598	2012 QY_{56}	—	August 26, 2012	Haleakala	Pan-STARRS 1	·	1.7 km	MPC · JPL
889599	2012 QL_{63}	—	August 14, 2018	Haleakala	Pan-STARRS 1	·	2.0 km	MPC · JPL
889600	2012 QD_{65}	—	August 23, 2012	Bergisch Gladbach	W. Bickel	MRX	770 m	MPC · JPL

== 889601–889700 ==
back to top

Designation			Discovery			Properties		Ref
Permanent	Provisional	Named after	Date	Site	Discoverer(s)	Category	Diam.	Ref
889601	2012 QG_{70}	—	August 25, 2012	Haleakala	Pan-STARRS 1	(5)	1.1 km	MPC · JPL
889602	2012 QB_{71}	—	August 26, 2012	Haleakala	Pan-STARRS 1	·	840 m	MPC · JPL
889603	2012 QQ_{72}	—	October 7, 2008	Mount Lemmon	Mount Lemmon Survey	·	1 km	MPC · JPL
889604	2012 QA_{80}	—	August 24, 2012	Kitt Peak	Spacewatch	·	2.1 km	MPC · JPL
889605	2012 RR_{10}	—	September 12, 2012	ESA OGS	E. Schwab	MAR	600 m	MPC · JPL
889606	2012 RX_{10}	—	September 13, 2012	Mount Lemmon	Mount Lemmon Survey	·	1.0 km	MPC · JPL
889607	2012 RL_{19}	—	November 11, 2004	Kitt Peak	Spacewatch	·	1.2 km	MPC · JPL
889608	2012 RX_{45}	—	September 14, 2012	Mount Lemmon	Mount Lemmon Survey	·	1.2 km	MPC · JPL
889609	2012 SC_{3}	—	September 14, 2012	Mount Lemmon	Mount Lemmon Survey	·	1.1 km	MPC · JPL
889610	2012 SC_{4}	—	September 17, 2012	Kitt Peak	Spacewatch	·	1.1 km	MPC · JPL
889611	2012 SK_{22}	—	September 16, 2012	Catalina	LINEAR	·	1.1 km	MPC · JPL
889612	2012 SN_{24}	—	September 17, 2012	Mount Lemmon	Mount Lemmon Survey	·	1.0 km	MPC · JPL
889613	2012 SN_{31}	—	September 18, 2012	Kitt Peak	Spacewatch	·	920 m	MPC · JPL
889614	2012 ST_{67}	—	September 21, 2012	Kitt Peak	Spacewatch	HYG	2.1 km	MPC · JPL
889615	2012 SF_{74}	—	September 26, 2012	Mount Lemmon	Mount Lemmon Survey	·	1.7 km	MPC · JPL
889616	2012 SR_{75}	—	August 3, 2016	Haleakala	Pan-STARRS 1	·	1.2 km	MPC · JPL
889617	2012 SE_{77}	—	September 23, 2012	Kitt Peak	Spacewatch	·	460 m	MPC · JPL
889618	2012 SS_{84}	—	September 16, 2012	Nogales	M. Schwartz, P. R. Holvorcem	·	1.0 km	MPC · JPL
889619	2012 SU_{84}	—	September 21, 2012	Kitt Peak	Spacewatch	EUN	650 m	MPC · JPL
889620	2012 SW_{84}	—	September 25, 2012	Mount Lemmon	Mount Lemmon Survey	·	460 m	MPC · JPL
889621	2012 SH_{89}	—	September 24, 2012	Kitt Peak	Spacewatch	·	840 m	MPC · JPL
889622	2012 SS_{92}	—	October 23, 2009	Kitt Peak	Spacewatch	·	580 m	MPC · JPL
889623	2012 SM_{96}	—	September 19, 2012	Mount Lemmon	Mount Lemmon Survey	·	1.4 km	MPC · JPL
889624	2012 SJ_{99}	—	September 21, 2012	Catalina	CSS	·	2.5 km	MPC · JPL
889625	2012 SK_{99}	—	September 25, 2012	Mount Lemmon	Mount Lemmon Survey	·	1.1 km	MPC · JPL
889626	2012 ST_{99}	—	September 25, 2012	Kitt Peak	Spacewatch	GEF	690 m	MPC · JPL
889627	2012 TK_{1}	—	September 27, 2008	Mount Lemmon	Mount Lemmon Survey	·	700 m	MPC · JPL
889628	2012 TL_{1}	—	September 22, 2012	Kitt Peak	Spacewatch	·	1.4 km	MPC · JPL
889629	2012 TL_{17}	—	November 18, 2008	Kitt Peak	Spacewatch	·	720 m	MPC · JPL
889630	2012 TB_{32}	—	September 16, 2012	Kitt Peak	Spacewatch	·	1.6 km	MPC · JPL
889631	2012 TN_{37}	—	October 6, 2012	Haleakala	Pan-STARRS 1	·	1.1 km	MPC · JPL
889632	2012 TM_{63}	—	August 18, 2006	Kitt Peak	Spacewatch	·	2.7 km	MPC · JPL
889633	2012 TA_{64}	—	October 8, 2012	Haleakala	Pan-STARRS 1	EUN	760 m	MPC · JPL
889634	2012 TE_{67}	—	October 8, 2012	Mount Lemmon	Mount Lemmon Survey	·	1.3 km	MPC · JPL
889635	2012 TT_{70}	—	October 9, 2012	Nogales	M. Schwartz, P. R. Holvorcem	DOR	1.9 km	MPC · JPL
889636	2012 TW_{85}	—	October 6, 2012	Mount Lemmon	Mount Lemmon Survey	·	2.2 km	MPC · JPL
889637	2012 TZ_{89}	—	October 7, 2012	Haleakala	Pan-STARRS 1	PHO	640 m	MPC · JPL
889638	2012 TZ_{99}	—	September 16, 2012	Kitt Peak	Spacewatch	·	1.1 km	MPC · JPL
889639	2012 TF_{107}	—	October 10, 2012	Mount Lemmon	Mount Lemmon Survey	·	810 m	MPC · JPL
889640	2012 TH_{112}	—	October 10, 2012	Mount Lemmon	Mount Lemmon Survey	·	2.6 km	MPC · JPL
889641	2012 TT_{128}	—	October 7, 2012	Haleakala	Pan-STARRS 1	H	330 m	MPC · JPL
889642	2012 TG_{144}	—	October 9, 2012	Charleston	International Astronomical Search Collaboration	(1547)	1 km	MPC · JPL
889643	2012 TG_{157}	—	September 15, 2012	ESA OGS	ESA OGS	·	2.1 km	MPC · JPL
889644	2012 TV_{163}	—	September 23, 2012	Kitt Peak	Spacewatch	·	790 m	MPC · JPL
889645	2012 TX_{180}	—	March 12, 2005	Kitt Peak	Deep Ecliptic Survey	·	1.9 km	MPC · JPL
889646	2012 TG_{205}	—	October 11, 2012	Kitt Peak	Spacewatch	·	470 m	MPC · JPL
889647	2012 TH_{216}	—	October 13, 2012	Mayhill-ISON	L. Elenin	·	790 m	MPC · JPL
889648	2012 TA_{219}	—	October 8, 2012	Kitt Peak	Spacewatch	AMO +1km	890 m	MPC · JPL
889649	2012 TA_{229}	—	October 15, 2012	Haleakala	Pan-STARRS 1	H	300 m	MPC · JPL
889650	2012 TJ_{230}	—	September 21, 2003	Kitt Peak	Spacewatch	·	880 m	MPC · JPL
889651	2012 TL_{248}	—	October 11, 2012	Haleakala	Pan-STARRS 1	·	460 m	MPC · JPL
889652	2012 TH_{253}	—	October 11, 2012	Haleakala	Pan-STARRS 1	·	820 m	MPC · JPL
889653	2012 TJ_{255}	—	October 13, 2012	Kitt Peak	Spacewatch	·	880 m	MPC · JPL
889654	2012 TC_{259}	—	October 8, 2012	Haleakala	Pan-STARRS 1	·	1.1 km	MPC · JPL
889655	2012 TJ_{268}	—	October 10, 2012	Kitt Peak	Spacewatch	·	2.1 km	MPC · JPL
889656	2012 TY_{278}	—	October 11, 2012	Haleakala	Pan-STARRS 1	·	1.1 km	MPC · JPL
889657	2012 TR_{280}	—	October 11, 2012	Haleakala	Pan-STARRS 1	·	460 m	MPC · JPL
889658	2012 TM_{305}	—	October 8, 2012	Haleakala	Pan-STARRS 1	·	900 m	MPC · JPL
889659	2012 TT_{317}	—	October 8, 2012	Haleakala	Pan-STARRS 1	·	930 m	MPC · JPL
889660	2012 TL_{329}	—	October 10, 2012	Mount Lemmon	Mount Lemmon Survey	·	840 m	MPC · JPL
889661	2012 TM_{335}	—	October 9, 2012	Haleakala	Pan-STARRS 1	·	920 m	MPC · JPL
889662	2012 TX_{338}	—	October 6, 2012	Haleakala	Pan-STARRS 1	·	590 m	MPC · JPL
889663	2012 TF_{340}	—	October 7, 2012	Haleakala	Pan-STARRS 1	·	960 m	MPC · JPL
889664	2012 TN_{341}	—	October 9, 2012	Haleakala	Pan-STARRS 1	·	890 m	MPC · JPL
889665	2012 TL_{346}	—	October 11, 2012	Haleakala	Pan-STARRS 1	·	990 m	MPC · JPL
889666	2012 TP_{353}	—	March 22, 2015	Haleakala	Pan-STARRS 1	·	2.1 km	MPC · JPL
889667	2012 TB_{355}	—	October 10, 2012	Mount Lemmon	Mount Lemmon Survey	·	770 m	MPC · JPL
889668	2012 TA_{356}	—	October 9, 2012	Haleakala	Pan-STARRS 1	·	410 m	MPC · JPL
889669	2012 TA_{358}	—	October 15, 2012	Mount Lemmon	Mount Lemmon Survey	·	800 m	MPC · JPL
889670	2012 TA_{369}	—	October 11, 2012	Haleakala	Pan-STARRS 1	URS	2.2 km	MPC · JPL
889671	2012 TY_{373}	—	October 8, 2012	Haleakala	Pan-STARRS 1	·	430 m	MPC · JPL
889672	2012 TF_{382}	—	October 11, 2012	Haleakala	Pan-STARRS 1	AGN	680 m	MPC · JPL
889673	2012 TC_{383}	—	October 8, 2012	Haleakala	Pan-STARRS 1	·	1.1 km	MPC · JPL
889674	2012 TY_{385}	—	October 6, 2012	Haleakala	Pan-STARRS 1	·	890 m	MPC · JPL
889675	2012 TD_{387}	—	October 14, 2012	Nogales	M. Schwartz, P. R. Holvorcem	·	900 m	MPC · JPL
889676	2012 TE_{387}	—	November 2, 2008	Mount Lemmon	Mount Lemmon Survey	·	710 m	MPC · JPL
889677	2012 TW_{387}	—	October 11, 2012	Haleakala	Pan-STARRS 1	·	1.0 km	MPC · JPL
889678	2012 TN_{408}	—	October 9, 2012	Haleakala	Pan-STARRS 1	·	2.0 km	MPC · JPL
889679	2012 UN_{4}	—	October 16, 2012	Mount Lemmon	Mount Lemmon Survey	T_{j} (2.97)	2.4 km	MPC · JPL
889680	2012 UW_{4}	—	October 16, 2012	Mount Lemmon	Mount Lemmon Survey	·	2.1 km	MPC · JPL
889681	2012 UH_{12}	—	November 17, 2008	Kitt Peak	Spacewatch	(5)	800 m	MPC · JPL
889682	2012 UF_{22}	—	October 16, 2012	Mount Lemmon	Mount Lemmon Survey	·	1.2 km	MPC · JPL
889683	2012 UM_{34}	—	October 20, 2012	Mount Lemmon	Mount Lemmon Survey	H	360 m	MPC · JPL
889684	2012 UZ_{35}	—	October 16, 2012	Kitt Peak	Spacewatch	·	860 m	MPC · JPL
889685	2012 US_{38}	—	October 17, 2012	Kitt Peak	Spacewatch	EUN	810 m	MPC · JPL
889686	2012 UB_{62}	—	November 24, 2008	Mount Lemmon	Mount Lemmon Survey	·	720 m	MPC · JPL
889687	2012 UV_{62}	—	January 2, 2009	Mount Lemmon	Mount Lemmon Survey	·	1.0 km	MPC · JPL
889688	2012 UY_{83}	—	October 20, 2012	Kitt Peak	Spacewatch	EUN	720 m	MPC · JPL
889689	2012 US_{89}	—	October 21, 2012	Haleakala	Pan-STARRS 1	·	1.3 km	MPC · JPL
889690	2012 UE_{92}	—	September 19, 2012	Mount Lemmon	Mount Lemmon Survey	H	340 m	MPC · JPL
889691	2012 UU_{93}	—	October 17, 2012	Mount Lemmon	Mount Lemmon Survey	·	2.4 km	MPC · JPL
889692	2012 UO_{97}	—	October 18, 2012	Mount Lemmon	Mount Lemmon Survey	·	800 m	MPC · JPL
889693	2012 UH_{99}	—	October 8, 2012	Mount Lemmon	Mount Lemmon Survey	·	730 m	MPC · JPL
889694	2012 UW_{101}	—	October 10, 2012	Kitt Peak	Spacewatch	HNS	760 m	MPC · JPL
889695	2012 UH_{122}	—	March 26, 2001	Kitt Peak	Deep Ecliptic Survey	·	850 m	MPC · JPL
889696	2012 UL_{129}	—	October 19, 2012	Mount Lemmon	Mount Lemmon Survey	DOR	2.0 km	MPC · JPL
889697	2012 UH_{130}	—	October 11, 2012	Bergisch Gladbach	W. Bickel	·	720 m	MPC · JPL
889698	2012 UK_{158}	—	October 5, 2012	Haleakala	Pan-STARRS 1	·	940 m	MPC · JPL
889699	2012 UD_{161}	—	November 18, 2003	Kitt Peak	Spacewatch	·	1.0 km	MPC · JPL
889700	2012 UM_{164}	—	October 16, 2012	Catalina	CSS	·	1.4 km	MPC · JPL

== 889701–889800 ==
back to top

Designation			Discovery			Properties		Ref
Permanent	Provisional	Named after	Date	Site	Discoverer(s)	Category	Diam.	Ref
889701	2012 UR_{165}	—	October 23, 2012	Haleakala	Pan-STARRS 1	EUN	660 m	MPC · JPL
889702	2012 US_{171}	—	September 16, 2012	Kitt Peak	Spacewatch	·	540 m	MPC · JPL
889703	2012 UX_{180}	—	October 16, 2012	Mount Lemmon	Mount Lemmon Survey	·	1.2 km	MPC · JPL
889704	2012 UV_{181}	—	October 18, 2012	Haleakala	Pan-STARRS 1	·	1.2 km	MPC · JPL
889705	2012 UV_{187}	—	October 20, 2012	Haleakala	Pan-STARRS 1	H	370 m	MPC · JPL
889706	2012 UE_{188}	—	October 18, 2012	Haleakala	Pan-STARRS 1	BRA	1.2 km	MPC · JPL
889707	2012 UV_{190}	—	October 20, 2012	Haleakala	Pan-STARRS 1	H	310 m	MPC · JPL
889708	2012 UH_{192}	—	October 18, 2012	Haleakala	Pan-STARRS 1	·	1.2 km	MPC · JPL
889709	2012 UF_{193}	—	October 22, 2012	Kitt Peak	Spacewatch	·	1.0 km	MPC · JPL
889710	2012 UE_{196}	—	October 18, 2012	Mount Lemmon	Mount Lemmon Survey	EUN	590 m	MPC · JPL
889711	2012 UF_{198}	—	October 18, 2012	Mount Lemmon	Mount Lemmon Survey	·	830 m	MPC · JPL
889712	2012 UE_{204}	—	October 23, 2012	Haleakala	Pan-STARRS 1	·	730 m	MPC · JPL
889713	2012 UQ_{207}	—	October 17, 2012	Haleakala	Pan-STARRS 1	·	1.2 km	MPC · JPL
889714	2012 UQ_{210}	—	October 18, 2012	Haleakala	Pan-STARRS 1	·	450 m	MPC · JPL
889715	2012 UN_{222}	—	October 22, 2012	Haleakala	Pan-STARRS 1	·	810 m	MPC · JPL
889716	2012 UC_{223}	—	October 17, 2012	Mount Lemmon	Mount Lemmon Survey	·	810 m	MPC · JPL
889717	2012 UZ_{223}	—	October 18, 2012	Mount Lemmon	Mount Lemmon Survey	KRM	1.3 km	MPC · JPL
889718	2012 UE_{227}	—	October 16, 2012	Mount Lemmon	Mount Lemmon Survey	·	680 m	MPC · JPL
889719	2012 UG_{244}	—	October 23, 2012	Haleakala	Pan-STARRS 1	MAR	730 m	MPC · JPL
889720	2012 UY_{244}	—	October 18, 2012	Haleakala	Pan-STARRS 1	·	830 m	MPC · JPL
889721	2012 UB_{245}	—	October 17, 2012	Mount Lemmon	Mount Lemmon Survey	·	740 m	MPC · JPL
889722	2012 UR_{246}	—	October 18, 2012	Haleakala	Pan-STARRS 1	·	770 m	MPC · JPL
889723	2012 UU_{246}	—	October 18, 2012	Haleakala	Pan-STARRS 1	·	760 m	MPC · JPL
889724	2012 UX_{247}	—	October 22, 2012	Haleakala	Pan-STARRS 1	AGN	720 m	MPC · JPL
889725	2012 UX_{248}	—	October 17, 2012	Haleakala	Pan-STARRS 1	·	750 m	MPC · JPL
889726	2012 UY_{248}	—	November 24, 2008	Kitt Peak	Spacewatch	·	730 m	MPC · JPL
889727	2012 UR_{259}	—	October 18, 2012	Haleakala	Pan-STARRS 1	ELF	2.4 km	MPC · JPL
889728	2012 VS_{4}	—	November 19, 2008	Kitt Peak	Spacewatch	·	900 m	MPC · JPL
889729	2012 VE_{7}	—	November 13, 2007	Kitt Peak	Spacewatch	H	330 m	MPC · JPL
889730	2012 VM_{7}	—	October 23, 2008	Mount Lemmon	Mount Lemmon Survey	·	1.1 km	MPC · JPL
889731	2012 VQ_{7}	—	October 1, 2002	Haleakala	NEAT	·	460 m	MPC · JPL
889732	2012 VK_{11}	—	October 8, 2012	Kitt Peak	Spacewatch	·	1.2 km	MPC · JPL
889733	2012 VK_{30}	—	October 17, 2012	Mount Lemmon	Mount Lemmon Survey	·	370 m	MPC · JPL
889734	2012 VN_{45}	—	October 15, 2012	Kitt Peak	Spacewatch	H	290 m	MPC · JPL
889735	2012 VP_{59}	—	October 21, 2012	Haleakala	Pan-STARRS 1	·	1.1 km	MPC · JPL
889736	2012 VQ_{71}	—	October 21, 2012	Kitt Peak	Spacewatch	·	560 m	MPC · JPL
889737	2012 VR_{73}	—	November 7, 2012	Mount Lemmon	Mount Lemmon Survey	·	1.1 km	MPC · JPL
889738	2012 VM_{77}	—	October 19, 2012	Mount Lemmon	Mount Lemmon Survey	H	290 m	MPC · JPL
889739	2012 VU_{77}	—	December 22, 2008	Kitt Peak	Spacewatch	·	780 m	MPC · JPL
889740	2012 VW_{79}	—	October 8, 2012	Kitt Peak	Spacewatch	·	660 m	MPC · JPL
889741	2012 VS_{95}	—	December 21, 2008	Mount Lemmon	Mount Lemmon Survey	·	720 m	MPC · JPL
889742	2012 VY_{108}	—	October 11, 2012	Piszkéstető	K. Sárneczky	·	810 m	MPC · JPL
889743	2012 VL_{110}	—	November 7, 2008	Mount Lemmon	Mount Lemmon Survey	(5)	840 m	MPC · JPL
889744	2012 VP_{117}	—	November 7, 2012	Kitt Peak	Spacewatch	(5)	830 m	MPC · JPL
889745	2012 VZ_{132}	—	November 13, 2012	Mount Lemmon	Mount Lemmon Survey	·	880 m	MPC · JPL
889746	2012 VE_{133}	—	November 5, 2012	Haleakala	Pan-STARRS 1	·	2.5 km	MPC · JPL
889747	2012 VV_{134}	—	November 5, 2012	Kitt Peak	Spacewatch	·	970 m	MPC · JPL
889748	2012 VW_{134}	—	October 10, 2012	Mount Lemmon	Mount Lemmon Survey	·	1.1 km	MPC · JPL
889749	2012 VP_{138}	—	November 7, 2012	Mount Lemmon	Mount Lemmon Survey	·	1.2 km	MPC · JPL
889750	2012 VC_{139}	—	October 21, 2012	Catalina	CSS	·	1.4 km	MPC · JPL
889751	2012 VA_{146}	—	November 3, 2012	Haleakala	Pan-STARRS 1	·	800 m	MPC · JPL
889752	2012 VH_{160}	—	November 13, 2012	ESA OGS	ESA OGS	·	840 m	MPC · JPL
889753	2012 VV_{161}	—	November 7, 2012	Haleakala	Pan-STARRS 1	·	740 m	MPC · JPL
889754	2012 WK_{2}	—	November 17, 2012	Mount Lemmon	Mount Lemmon Survey	·	1.4 km	MPC · JPL
889755	2012 WK_{5}	—	November 5, 2012	Kitt Peak	Spacewatch	·	390 m	MPC · JPL
889756	2012 WW_{14}	—	November 14, 2012	Kitt Peak	Spacewatch	·	740 m	MPC · JPL
889757	2012 WT_{15}	—	November 19, 2012	Kitt Peak	Spacewatch	·	1.1 km	MPC · JPL
889758	2012 WG_{20}	—	November 7, 2012	Kitt Peak	Spacewatch	HNS	830 m	MPC · JPL
889759	2012 WS_{20}	—	November 20, 2012	Mount Lemmon	Mount Lemmon Survey	EUN	770 m	MPC · JPL
889760	2012 WP_{21}	—	November 6, 2012	Kitt Peak	Spacewatch	(5)	810 m	MPC · JPL
889761	2012 WN_{24}	—	November 20, 2012	Mount Lemmon	Mount Lemmon Survey	·	940 m	MPC · JPL
889762	2012 WZ_{34}	—	November 26, 2012	Mount Lemmon	Mount Lemmon Survey	·	1.3 km	MPC · JPL
889763	2012 WO_{38}	—	November 19, 2012	Kitt Peak	Spacewatch	H	340 m	MPC · JPL
889764	2012 WU_{38}	—	November 26, 2012	Mount Lemmon	Mount Lemmon Survey	·	1.3 km	MPC · JPL
889765	2012 WB_{42}	—	November 22, 2012	Mount Graham	K. Černis, R. P. Boyle	·	930 m	MPC · JPL
889766	2012 WP_{42}	—	November 17, 2012	Mount Lemmon	Mount Lemmon Survey	MAR	630 m	MPC · JPL
889767	2012 WE_{45}	—	November 24, 2012	Kitt Peak	Spacewatch	·	970 m	MPC · JPL
889768	2012 WJ_{47}	—	November 23, 2012	Kitt Peak	Spacewatch	·	780 m	MPC · JPL
889769	2012 XA_{3}	—	December 3, 2012	Mount Lemmon	Mount Lemmon Survey	ADE	1.0 km	MPC · JPL
889770	2012 XV_{15}	—	November 13, 2012	Kitt Peak	Spacewatch	·	880 m	MPC · JPL
889771	2012 XC_{23}	—	December 2, 2008	Kitt Peak	Spacewatch	·	790 m	MPC · JPL
889772	2012 XG_{32}	—	November 13, 2012	Mount Lemmon	Mount Lemmon Survey	·	740 m	MPC · JPL
889773	2012 XP_{32}	—	November 25, 2012	Haleakala	Pan-STARRS 1	·	480 m	MPC · JPL
889774	2012 XL_{37}	—	December 3, 2012	Mount Lemmon	Mount Lemmon Survey	·	960 m	MPC · JPL
889775	2012 XJ_{48}	—	November 22, 2012	Kitt Peak	Spacewatch	·	540 m	MPC · JPL
889776	2012 XX_{49}	—	November 14, 2012	Kitt Peak	Spacewatch	·	770 m	MPC · JPL
889777	2012 XL_{69}	—	October 21, 2012	Piszkéstető	K. Sárneczky, G. Hodosán	·	1.0 km	MPC · JPL
889778	2012 XA_{70}	—	December 5, 2012	Mount Lemmon	Mount Lemmon Survey	EUN	670 m	MPC · JPL
889779	2012 XH_{72}	—	October 13, 2012	Kitt Peak	Spacewatch	·	830 m	MPC · JPL
889780	2012 XP_{74}	—	November 7, 2012	Mount Lemmon	Mount Lemmon Survey	·	850 m	MPC · JPL
889781	2012 XR_{75}	—	December 6, 2012	Mount Lemmon	Mount Lemmon Survey	(5)	710 m	MPC · JPL
889782	2012 XH_{78}	—	December 6, 2012	Mount Lemmon	Mount Lemmon Survey	·	1.3 km	MPC · JPL
889783	2012 XL_{79}	—	December 6, 2012	Mount Lemmon	Mount Lemmon Survey	·	370 m	MPC · JPL
889784	2012 XW_{81}	—	December 6, 2012	Mount Lemmon	Mount Lemmon Survey	·	990 m	MPC · JPL
889785	2012 XK_{83}	—	January 18, 2009	Kitt Peak	Spacewatch	·	840 m	MPC · JPL
889786	2012 XV_{85}	—	November 26, 2012	Mount Lemmon	Mount Lemmon Survey	·	880 m	MPC · JPL
889787	2012 XY_{88}	—	October 6, 2005	Mount Lemmon	Mount Lemmon Survey	·	440 m	MPC · JPL
889788	2012 XY_{96}	—	December 5, 2012	Mount Lemmon	Mount Lemmon Survey	·	930 m	MPC · JPL
889789	2012 XE_{98}	—	December 5, 2012	Mount Lemmon	Mount Lemmon Survey	·	490 m	MPC · JPL
889790	2012 XM_{103}	—	December 6, 2012	Kitt Peak	Spacewatch	·	1.1 km	MPC · JPL
889791	2012 XC_{113}	—	January 2, 2009	Mount Lemmon	Mount Lemmon Survey	·	990 m	MPC · JPL
889792	2012 XY_{118}	—	December 8, 2012	Mount Lemmon	Mount Lemmon Survey	·	500 m	MPC · JPL
889793	2012 XY_{124}	—	January 17, 2005	Kitt Peak	Spacewatch	RAF	590 m	MPC · JPL
889794	2012 XS_{126}	—	December 10, 2012	Haleakala	Pan-STARRS 1	·	470 m	MPC · JPL
889795	2012 XA_{133}	—	December 11, 2012	Mount Lemmon	Mount Lemmon Survey	APO · PHA	220 m	MPC · JPL
889796	2012 XH_{141}	—	December 3, 2012	Mount Lemmon	Mount Lemmon Survey	(5)	860 m	MPC · JPL
889797	2012 XJ_{149}	—	November 12, 2012	Mount Lemmon	Mount Lemmon Survey	AEO	780 m	MPC · JPL
889798	2012 XU_{154}	—	November 12, 2012	Mount Lemmon	Mount Lemmon Survey	(5)	700 m	MPC · JPL
889799	2012 XE_{156}	—	November 4, 2012	Kitt Peak	Spacewatch	·	840 m	MPC · JPL
889800	2012 XH_{161}	—	December 11, 2012	Mount Lemmon	Mount Lemmon Survey	·	810 m	MPC · JPL

== 889801–889900 ==
back to top

Designation			Discovery			Properties		Ref
Permanent	Provisional	Named after	Date	Site	Discoverer(s)	Category	Diam.	Ref
889801	2012 XH_{162}	—	April 30, 2014	Haleakala	Pan-STARRS 1	PHO	550 m	MPC · JPL
889802	2012 XM_{163}	—	December 10, 2012	Haleakala	Pan-STARRS 1	·	1.1 km	MPC · JPL
889803	2012 XM_{164}	—	December 12, 2012	Mount Lemmon	Mount Lemmon Survey	·	1.0 km	MPC · JPL
889804	2012 XB_{165}	—	December 3, 2012	Mount Lemmon	Mount Lemmon Survey	·	880 m	MPC · JPL
889805	2012 XD_{171}	—	December 12, 2012	Mount Lemmon	Mount Lemmon Survey	·	410 m	MPC · JPL
889806	2012 XH_{172}	—	December 3, 2012	Mount Lemmon	Mount Lemmon Survey	·	890 m	MPC · JPL
889807	2012 XQ_{173}	—	December 11, 2012	Kitt Peak	Spacewatch	·	1.3 km	MPC · JPL
889808	2012 XD_{174}	—	October 28, 2008	Kitt Peak	Spacewatch	·	1.0 km	MPC · JPL
889809	2012 XO_{175}	—	December 10, 2012	Mount Lemmon	Mount Lemmon Survey	H	420 m	MPC · JPL
889810	2012 XU_{175}	—	December 9, 2012	Haleakala	Pan-STARRS 1	·	800 m	MPC · JPL
889811	2012 XJ_{180}	—	December 8, 2012	Mount Lemmon	Mount Lemmon Survey	H	260 m	MPC · JPL
889812	2012 XN_{184}	—	December 11, 2012	Mount Lemmon	Mount Lemmon Survey	·	1.3 km	MPC · JPL
889813	2012 YL	—	December 7, 2008	Mount Lemmon	Mount Lemmon Survey	BAR	760 m	MPC · JPL
889814	2012 YS_{3}	—	December 21, 2012	Mount Lemmon	Mount Lemmon Survey	·	1.3 km	MPC · JPL
889815	2012 YT_{5}	—	January 19, 2005	Kitt Peak	Spacewatch	·	1.1 km	MPC · JPL
889816	2012 YR_{13}	—	December 22, 2012	Haleakala	Pan-STARRS 1	·	1.4 km	MPC · JPL
889817	2012 YA_{15}	—	December 22, 2012	Haleakala	Pan-STARRS 1	(1547)	1.0 km	MPC · JPL
889818	2012 YE_{16}	—	December 23, 2012	Haleakala	Pan-STARRS 1	·	1.3 km	MPC · JPL
889819	2012 YT_{16}	—	December 23, 2012	Haleakala	Pan-STARRS 1	·	1.0 km	MPC · JPL
889820	2012 YB_{17}	—	December 23, 2012	Haleakala	Pan-STARRS 1	·	870 m	MPC · JPL
889821	2012 YL_{18}	—	December 17, 2012	Nogales	M. Schwartz, P. R. Holvorcem	·	1.2 km	MPC · JPL
889822	2012 YX_{18}	—	December 23, 2012	Haleakala	Pan-STARRS 1	·	1.1 km	MPC · JPL
889823	2012 YN_{21}	—	December 23, 2012	Haleakala	Pan-STARRS 1	·	1.1 km	MPC · JPL
889824	2012 YS_{24}	—	December 11, 2012	Mount Lemmon	Mount Lemmon Survey	·	1.1 km	MPC · JPL
889825	2013 AL_{1}	—	December 21, 2012	Mount Lemmon	Mount Lemmon Survey	·	460 m	MPC · JPL
889826	2013 AE_{3}	—	January 3, 2013	Mount Lemmon	Mount Lemmon Survey	H	340 m	MPC · JPL
889827	2013 AR_{14}	—	January 3, 2013	Haleakala	Pan-STARRS 1	·	940 m	MPC · JPL
889828	2013 AH_{26}	—	December 11, 2012	Nogales	M. Schwartz, P. R. Holvorcem	H	380 m	MPC · JPL
889829	2013 AF_{31}	—	December 4, 2012	Mount Lemmon	Mount Lemmon Survey	·	880 m	MPC · JPL
889830	2013 AO_{33}	—	January 31, 2009	Kitt Peak	Spacewatch	·	1.1 km	MPC · JPL
889831	2013 AP_{43}	—	October 22, 2003	Apache Point	SDSS	·	850 m	MPC · JPL
889832	2013 AH_{46}	—	January 16, 2009	Kitt Peak	Spacewatch	·	870 m	MPC · JPL
889833	2013 AD_{47}	—	January 1, 2013	Haleakala	Pan-STARRS 1	H	360 m	MPC · JPL
889834	2013 AF_{49}	—	January 7, 2013	Mount Lemmon	Mount Lemmon Survey	·	880 m	MPC · JPL
889835	2013 AN_{49}	—	December 23, 2012	Haleakala	Pan-STARRS 1	EUN	690 m	MPC · JPL
889836	2013 AW_{49}	—	December 23, 2012	Haleakala	Pan-STARRS 1	H	280 m	MPC · JPL
889837	2013 AL_{53}	—	January 3, 2013	Mount Lemmon	Mount Lemmon Survey	H	350 m	MPC · JPL
889838	2013 AK_{60}	—	January 10, 2013	Nogales	M. Schwartz, P. R. Holvorcem	·	1.0 km	MPC · JPL
889839	2013 AM_{62}	—	January 6, 2013	Mount Lemmon	Mount Lemmon Survey	·	1.4 km	MPC · JPL
889840	2013 AZ_{62}	—	February 1, 2009	Mount Lemmon	Mount Lemmon Survey	·	870 m	MPC · JPL
889841	2013 AC_{73}	—	December 7, 2012	Kitt Peak	Spacewatch	·	1.1 km	MPC · JPL
889842	2013 AK_{88}	—	December 25, 2005	Kitt Peak	Spacewatch	·	640 m	MPC · JPL
889843	2013 AD_{94}	—	January 9, 2013	Catalina	CSS	H	390 m	MPC · JPL
889844	2013 AR_{97}	—	January 5, 2013	Mount Lemmon	Mount Lemmon Survey	·	870 m	MPC · JPL
889845	2013 AJ_{98}	—	January 6, 2013	Kitt Peak	Spacewatch	·	980 m	MPC · JPL
889846	2013 AF_{103}	—	January 5, 2013	Mount Lemmon	Mount Lemmon Survey	·	420 m	MPC · JPL
889847	2013 AA_{111}	—	January 4, 2013	Kitt Peak	Spacewatch	PHO	490 m	MPC · JPL
889848	2013 AJ_{116}	—	January 14, 2013	ESA OGS	ESA OGS	·	900 m	MPC · JPL
889849	2013 AS_{122}	—	January 6, 2013	Kitt Peak	Spacewatch	·	870 m	MPC · JPL
889850	2013 AE_{123}	—	November 12, 2012	Mount Lemmon	Mount Lemmon Survey	(5)	860 m	MPC · JPL
889851	2013 AQ_{124}	—	January 18, 2008	Mount Lemmon	Mount Lemmon Survey	H	330 m	MPC · JPL
889852	2013 AJ_{130}	—	January 14, 2013	Haleakala	Pan-STARRS 1	H	330 m	MPC · JPL
889853	2013 AV_{151}	—	January 4, 2013	Cerro Tololo-DECam	WISE	·	990 m	MPC · JPL
889854	2013 AN_{184}	—	January 10, 2013	Haleakala	Pan-STARRS 1	EUN	920 m	MPC · JPL
889855	2013 AK_{185}	—	January 10, 2013	Haleakala	Pan-STARRS 1	·	480 m	MPC · JPL
889856	2013 AX_{186}	—	January 10, 2013	Haleakala	Pan-STARRS 1	·	1.4 km	MPC · JPL
889857	2013 AX_{187}	—	September 20, 2011	Mount Lemmon	Mount Lemmon Survey	(5)	930 m	MPC · JPL
889858	2013 AZ_{189}	—	January 9, 2013	Kitt Peak	Spacewatch	·	480 m	MPC · JPL
889859	2013 AL_{192}	—	January 13, 2013	Ouka{\"\i}meden	C. Rinner	(5)	1.1 km	MPC · JPL
889860	2013 AN_{192}	—	January 14, 2013	Mount Lemmon	Mount Lemmon Survey	·	1.0 km	MPC · JPL
889861	2013 AA_{194}	—	January 5, 2013	Mount Lemmon	Mount Lemmon Survey	·	1.0 km	MPC · JPL
889862	2013 AJ_{194}	—	January 8, 2013	Mount Lemmon	Mount Lemmon Survey	·	1.1 km	MPC · JPL
889863	2013 AN_{196}	—	January 5, 2013	Mount Lemmon	Mount Lemmon Survey	·	750 m	MPC · JPL
889864	2013 AN_{197}	—	January 10, 2013	Haleakala	Pan-STARRS 1	EUN	880 m	MPC · JPL
889865	2013 AR_{198}	—	January 13, 2013	Mount Lemmon	Mount Lemmon Survey	·	940 m	MPC · JPL
889866	2013 AD_{199}	—	January 5, 2013	Mount Lemmon	Mount Lemmon Survey	·	1.2 km	MPC · JPL
889867	2013 AM_{200}	—	January 10, 2013	Mount Lemmon	Mount Lemmon Survey	BRG	970 m	MPC · JPL
889868	2013 AZ_{200}	—	January 5, 2013	Kitt Peak	Spacewatch	·	430 m	MPC · JPL
889869	2013 AA_{201}	—	January 10, 2013	Haleakala	Pan-STARRS 1	·	710 m	MPC · JPL
889870	2013 AQ_{201}	—	January 4, 2013	Kitt Peak	Spacewatch	·	820 m	MPC · JPL
889871	2013 AR_{201}	—	January 10, 2013	Haleakala	Pan-STARRS 1	MAR	600 m	MPC · JPL
889872	2013 AK_{204}	—	January 2, 2013	Mount Lemmon	Mount Lemmon Survey	·	470 m	MPC · JPL
889873	2013 AR_{206}	—	January 10, 2013	Haleakala	Pan-STARRS 1	·	1.2 km	MPC · JPL
889874	2013 AL_{207}	—	January 3, 2013	Mount Lemmon	Mount Lemmon Survey	·	1.4 km	MPC · JPL
889875	2013 AR_{207}	—	January 10, 2013	Haleakala	Pan-STARRS 1	·	1.0 km	MPC · JPL
889876	2013 BF_{1}	—	October 31, 2010	Mount Lemmon	Mount Lemmon Survey	L4	6.0 km	MPC · JPL
889877	2013 BB_{5}	—	December 7, 2012	Mount Lemmon	Mount Lemmon Survey	·	980 m	MPC · JPL
889878	2013 BB_{8}	—	December 30, 2008	Mount Lemmon	Mount Lemmon Survey	·	970 m	MPC · JPL
889879	2013 BX_{18}	—	January 17, 2013	Haleakala	Pan-STARRS 1	L4 · ERY	4.8 km	MPC · JPL
889880	2013 BY_{22}	—	January 17, 2013	Catalina	CSS	(1547)	1.2 km	MPC · JPL
889881	2013 BD_{25}	—	January 10, 2013	Haleakala	Pan-STARRS 1	·	730 m	MPC · JPL
889882	2013 BE_{27}	—	January 16, 2013	Haleakala	Pan-STARRS 1	APO	250 m	MPC · JPL
889883	2013 BJ_{36}	—	January 17, 2013	Haleakala	Pan-STARRS 1	·	1.3 km	MPC · JPL
889884	2013 BR_{41}	—	January 18, 2013	Mount Lemmon	Mount Lemmon Survey	·	930 m	MPC · JPL
889885	2013 BV_{43}	—	February 2, 2009	Kitt Peak	Spacewatch	·	820 m	MPC · JPL
889886	2013 BC_{54}	—	January 17, 2013	Kitt Peak	Spacewatch	·	790 m	MPC · JPL
889887	2013 BP_{54}	—	January 17, 2013	Kitt Peak	Spacewatch	H	300 m	MPC · JPL
889888	2013 BJ_{55}	—	January 17, 2013	Haleakala	Pan-STARRS 1	·	1.3 km	MPC · JPL
889889	2013 BV_{66}	—	January 20, 2013	Kitt Peak	Spacewatch	·	750 m	MPC · JPL
889890	2013 BN_{72}	—	January 7, 2013	Kitt Peak	Spacewatch	·	1.2 km	MPC · JPL
889891	2013 BP_{72}	—	January 10, 2013	Haleakala	Pan-STARRS 1	H	350 m	MPC · JPL
889892	2013 BS_{72}	—	January 20, 2013	Mount Lemmon	Mount Lemmon Survey	H	370 m	MPC · JPL
889893	2013 BO_{78}	—	January 5, 2013	Kitt Peak	Spacewatch	·	1.4 km	MPC · JPL
889894	2013 BX_{82}	—	January 31, 2013	Kitt Peak	Spacewatch	H	300 m	MPC · JPL
889895	2013 BM_{85}	—	January 22, 2013	Mount Lemmon	Mount Lemmon Survey	·	1.0 km	MPC · JPL
889896	2013 BW_{87}	—	January 17, 2013	Haleakala	Pan-STARRS 1	·	1.8 km	MPC · JPL
889897	2013 BX_{89}	—	January 18, 2013	Mount Lemmon	Mount Lemmon Survey	H	400 m	MPC · JPL
889898	2013 BY_{93}	—	January 20, 2013	Kitt Peak	Spacewatch	·	890 m	MPC · JPL
889899	2013 BA_{96}	—	January 17, 2013	Haleakala	Pan-STARRS 1	·	450 m	MPC · JPL
889900	2013 BE_{97}	—	January 16, 2013	ESA OGS	ESA OGS	·	1.1 km	MPC · JPL

== 889901–890000 ==
back to top

Designation			Discovery			Properties		Ref
Permanent	Provisional	Named after	Date	Site	Discoverer(s)	Category	Diam.	Ref
889901	2013 BP_{97}	—	January 20, 2013	Kitt Peak	Spacewatch	·	940 m	MPC · JPL
889902	2013 BB_{99}	—	January 16, 2013	Haleakala	Pan-STARRS 1	·	450 m	MPC · JPL
889903	2013 BD_{100}	—	January 19, 2013	Mount Lemmon	Mount Lemmon Survey	MAS	450 m	MPC · JPL
889904	2013 BK_{105}	—	January 17, 2013	Haleakala	Pan-STARRS 1	HNS	700 m	MPC · JPL
889905	2013 BL_{105}	—	January 20, 2013	Mount Lemmon	Mount Lemmon Survey	ADE	1.2 km	MPC · JPL
889906	2013 BM_{105}	—	January 17, 2013	Haleakala	Pan-STARRS 1	ADE	1.4 km	MPC · JPL
889907	2013 BP_{105}	—	January 19, 2013	Kitt Peak	Spacewatch	·	1.1 km	MPC · JPL
889908	2013 BZ_{105}	—	October 9, 2007	Mount Lemmon	Mount Lemmon Survey	·	1.0 km	MPC · JPL
889909	2013 BH_{108}	—	January 20, 2013	Kitt Peak	Spacewatch	·	430 m	MPC · JPL
889910	2013 CJ_{4}	—	January 10, 2013	Haleakala	Pan-STARRS 1	·	1.0 km	MPC · JPL
889911	2013 CO_{5}	—	February 2, 2013	Mount Lemmon	Mount Lemmon Survey	·	390 m	MPC · JPL
889912	2013 CJ_{7}	—	January 10, 2013	Haleakala	Pan-STARRS 1	ERI	1.1 km	MPC · JPL
889913	2013 CO_{22}	—	December 23, 2012	Haleakala	Pan-STARRS 1	·	380 m	MPC · JPL
889914	2013 CA_{34}	—	February 3, 2013	Haleakala	Pan-STARRS 1	·	1.5 km	MPC · JPL
889915	2013 CH_{36}	—	February 6, 2013	Kitt Peak	Spacewatch	H	320 m	MPC · JPL
889916	2013 CP_{36}	—	February 8, 2013	Haleakala	Pan-STARRS 1	H	350 m	MPC · JPL
889917	2013 CS_{38}	—	January 5, 2013	Kitt Peak	Spacewatch	H	440 m	MPC · JPL
889918	2013 CO_{53}	—	January 17, 2013	Mount Lemmon	Mount Lemmon Survey	·	2.1 km	MPC · JPL
889919	2013 CN_{54}	—	January 9, 2013	Kitt Peak	Spacewatch	·	1.2 km	MPC · JPL
889920	2013 CM_{57}	—	January 8, 2013	Mount Lemmon	Mount Lemmon Survey	H	350 m	MPC · JPL
889921	2013 CS_{57}	—	February 9, 2013	Ouka{\"\i}meden	C. Rinner	·	980 m	MPC · JPL
889922	2013 CT_{60}	—	January 22, 2013	Kitt Peak	Spacewatch	·	980 m	MPC · JPL
889923	2013 CW_{61}	—	February 6, 2013	Kitt Peak	Spacewatch	·	1.5 km	MPC · JPL
889924	2013 CJ_{62}	—	February 7, 2013	Nogales	M. Schwartz, P. R. Holvorcem	EUN	880 m	MPC · JPL
889925	2013 CH_{70}	—	January 19, 2013	Mount Lemmon	Mount Lemmon Survey	EUN	840 m	MPC · JPL
889926	2013 CW_{71}	—	January 10, 2013	Haleakala	Pan-STARRS 1	·	930 m	MPC · JPL
889927	2013 CY_{75}	—	January 20, 2013	Kitt Peak	Spacewatch	JUN	630 m	MPC · JPL
889928	2013 CB_{77}	—	February 7, 2013	Kitt Peak	Spacewatch	·	1.0 km	MPC · JPL
889929	2013 CC_{78}	—	February 8, 2013	Haleakala	Pan-STARRS 1	·	910 m	MPC · JPL
889930	2013 CV_{79}	—	January 31, 2009	Mount Lemmon	Mount Lemmon Survey	·	1.0 km	MPC · JPL
889931	2013 CK_{82}	—	February 8, 2013	Haleakala	Pan-STARRS 1	H	350 m	MPC · JPL
889932	2013 CP_{84}	—	February 5, 2013	Kitt Peak	Spacewatch	·	880 m	MPC · JPL
889933	2013 CQ_{89}	—	February 6, 2013	Kitt Peak	Spacewatch	·	1.1 km	MPC · JPL
889934	2013 CF_{92}	—	February 8, 2013	Haleakala	Pan-STARRS 1	·	410 m	MPC · JPL
889935	2013 CG_{95}	—	February 8, 2013	Haleakala	Pan-STARRS 1	·	1.1 km	MPC · JPL
889936	2013 CB_{96}	—	February 8, 2013	Haleakala	Pan-STARRS 1	HNS	820 m	MPC · JPL
889937	2013 CV_{102}	—	January 19, 2013	Kitt Peak	Spacewatch	·	840 m	MPC · JPL
889938	2013 CL_{104}	—	December 22, 2003	Kitt Peak	Spacewatch	ADE	1.3 km	MPC · JPL
889939	2013 CT_{105}	—	February 9, 2013	Haleakala	Pan-STARRS 1	·	370 m	MPC · JPL
889940	2013 CC_{107}	—	February 5, 2013	Kitt Peak	Spacewatch	NYS	770 m	MPC · JPL
889941	2013 CK_{108}	—	February 9, 2013	Haleakala	Pan-STARRS 1	ADE	1.3 km	MPC · JPL
889942	2013 CW_{108}	—	February 9, 2013	Haleakala	Pan-STARRS 1	·	1.1 km	MPC · JPL
889943	2013 CB_{112}	—	January 10, 2013	Mount Lemmon	Mount Lemmon Survey	·	1.1 km	MPC · JPL
889944	2013 CD_{115}	—	February 12, 2013	ESA OGS	ESA OGS	·	1.2 km	MPC · JPL
889945	2013 CK_{118}	—	February 11, 2013	Catalina	CSS	H	370 m	MPC · JPL
889946	2013 CO_{120}	—	February 8, 2013	Kitt Peak	Spacewatch	·	920 m	MPC · JPL
889947	2013 CK_{122}	—	February 9, 2013	Haleakala	Pan-STARRS 1	H	360 m	MPC · JPL
889948	2013 CP_{124}	—	February 12, 2013	Charleston	International Astronomical Search Collaboration	JUN	680 m	MPC · JPL
889949	2013 CQ_{128}	—	February 14, 2013	Mount Lemmon	Mount Lemmon Survey	H	310 m	MPC · JPL
889950	2013 CD_{138}	—	February 1, 2009	Kitt Peak	Spacewatch	·	920 m	MPC · JPL
889951	2013 CQ_{144}	—	February 14, 2013	Kitt Peak	Spacewatch	·	430 m	MPC · JPL
889952	2013 CO_{160}	—	February 14, 2013	Haleakala	Pan-STARRS 1	MAS	430 m	MPC · JPL
889953	2013 CO_{162}	—	February 5, 2013	Kitt Peak	Spacewatch	·	1.1 km	MPC · JPL
889954	2013 CG_{167}	—	December 17, 2003	Kitt Peak	Spacewatch	·	1.0 km	MPC · JPL
889955	2013 CT_{168}	—	February 14, 2013	Mount Lemmon	Mount Lemmon Survey	·	1.1 km	MPC · JPL
889956	2013 CL_{173}	—	February 15, 2013	Haleakala	Pan-STARRS 1	·	510 m	MPC · JPL
889957	2013 CQ_{175}	—	February 15, 2013	Haleakala	Pan-STARRS 1	·	1.2 km	MPC · JPL
889958	2013 CR_{178}	—	April 19, 2009	Mount Lemmon	Mount Lemmon Survey	·	1.1 km	MPC · JPL
889959	2013 CJ_{195}	—	February 9, 2013	Haleakala	Pan-STARRS 1	H	370 m	MPC · JPL
889960	2013 CM_{198}	—	February 5, 2013	Kitt Peak	Spacewatch	·	930 m	MPC · JPL
889961	2013 CB_{200}	—	February 9, 2013	Haleakala	Pan-STARRS 1	HNS	790 m	MPC · JPL
889962	2013 CO_{200}	—	February 9, 2013	Haleakala	Pan-STARRS 1	·	940 m	MPC · JPL
889963	2013 CD_{204}	—	February 9, 2013	Haleakala	Pan-STARRS 1	EUN	760 m	MPC · JPL
889964	2013 CQ_{207}	—	February 13, 2013	Haleakala	Pan-STARRS 1	·	1.0 km	MPC · JPL
889965	2013 CG_{208}	—	February 14, 2013	Mount Lemmon	Mount Lemmon Survey	·	1.2 km	MPC · JPL
889966	2013 CD_{211}	—	January 6, 2013	Kitt Peak	Spacewatch	H	340 m	MPC · JPL
889967	2013 CJ_{225}	—	October 31, 2011	Mount Lemmon	Mount Lemmon Survey	·	1.1 km	MPC · JPL
889968	2013 CD_{227}	—	February 14, 2013	Haleakala	Pan-STARRS 1	·	1.0 km	MPC · JPL
889969	2013 CM_{228}	—	February 15, 2013	Haleakala	Pan-STARRS 1	·	1.5 km	MPC · JPL
889970	2013 CB_{232}	—	February 14, 2013	Kitt Peak	Spacewatch	·	1.5 km	MPC · JPL
889971	2013 CD_{233}	—	February 9, 2013	Haleakala	Pan-STARRS 1	·	1.1 km	MPC · JPL
889972	2013 CK_{233}	—	February 14, 2013	Haleakala	Pan-STARRS 1	·	1.2 km	MPC · JPL
889973	2013 CC_{235}	—	February 5, 2013	Mount Lemmon	Mount Lemmon Survey	EUN	690 m	MPC · JPL
889974	2013 CJ_{235}	—	February 9, 2013	Haleakala	Pan-STARRS 1	·	460 m	MPC · JPL
889975	2013 CM_{236}	—	February 14, 2013	Haleakala	Pan-STARRS 1	·	1.5 km	MPC · JPL
889976	2013 CK_{237}	—	February 6, 2013	Kitt Peak	Spacewatch	·	940 m	MPC · JPL
889977	2013 CD_{238}	—	February 14, 2013	Mount Lemmon	Mount Lemmon Survey	·	680 m	MPC · JPL
889978	2013 CN_{238}	—	February 6, 2013	Ouka{\"\i}meden	C. Rinner	·	410 m	MPC · JPL
889979	2013 CP_{238}	—	February 15, 2013	Haleakala	Pan-STARRS 1	·	760 m	MPC · JPL
889980	2013 CV_{241}	—	February 15, 2013	Haleakala	Pan-STARRS 1	·	1.2 km	MPC · JPL
889981	2013 CG_{244}	—	February 3, 2013	Haleakala	Pan-STARRS 1	·	540 m	MPC · JPL
889982	2013 CV_{245}	—	February 10, 2013	Haleakala	Pan-STARRS 1	·	960 m	MPC · JPL
889983	2013 CQ_{247}	—	February 14, 2013	Kitt Peak	Spacewatch	·	950 m	MPC · JPL
889984	2013 CW_{247}	—	February 12, 2013	Haleakala	Pan-STARRS 1	BAR	670 m	MPC · JPL
889985	2013 CF_{248}	—	February 5, 2013	Mount Lemmon	Mount Lemmon Survey	H	340 m	MPC · JPL
889986	2013 CJ_{248}	—	February 9, 2013	Haleakala	Pan-STARRS 1	·	980 m	MPC · JPL
889987	2013 CG_{249}	—	February 7, 2013	Kitt Peak	Spacewatch	·	1.1 km	MPC · JPL
889988	2013 CV_{249}	—	February 15, 2013	Haleakala	Pan-STARRS 1	·	1.4 km	MPC · JPL
889989	2013 CA_{250}	—	February 3, 2013	Haleakala	Pan-STARRS 1	H	310 m	MPC · JPL
889990	2013 CA_{251}	—	February 8, 2013	Haleakala	Pan-STARRS 1	·	1.0 km	MPC · JPL
889991	2013 CK_{251}	—	February 15, 2013	Haleakala	Pan-STARRS 1	·	480 m	MPC · JPL
889992	2013 CP_{251}	—	February 15, 2013	Haleakala	Pan-STARRS 1	·	420 m	MPC · JPL
889993	2013 CE_{252}	—	February 9, 2013	Haleakala	Pan-STARRS 1	·	1.4 km	MPC · JPL
889994	2013 CY_{252}	—	February 6, 2013	Kitt Peak	Spacewatch	·	1.3 km	MPC · JPL
889995	2013 CJ_{257}	—	February 10, 2013	Haleakala	Pan-STARRS 1	·	1.4 km	MPC · JPL
889996	2013 CR_{257}	—	February 8, 2013	Haleakala	Pan-STARRS 1	·	490 m	MPC · JPL
889997	2013 CS_{258}	—	February 3, 2013	Haleakala	Pan-STARRS 1	·	1.2 km	MPC · JPL
889998	2013 CT_{258}	—	February 8, 2013	Haleakala	Pan-STARRS 1	·	1.2 km	MPC · JPL
889999	2013 CA_{260}	—	February 14, 2013	Haleakala	Pan-STARRS 1	EUN	750 m	MPC · JPL
890000	2013 CC_{260}	—	February 1, 2013	Kitt Peak	Spacewatch	·	1.2 km	MPC · JPL

back to top

== See also ==
- Meanings of minor-planet names: 889001–890000
