= Danuta Ptaszycka-Jackowska =

Polish geographer and landscape architect (1939–2025)

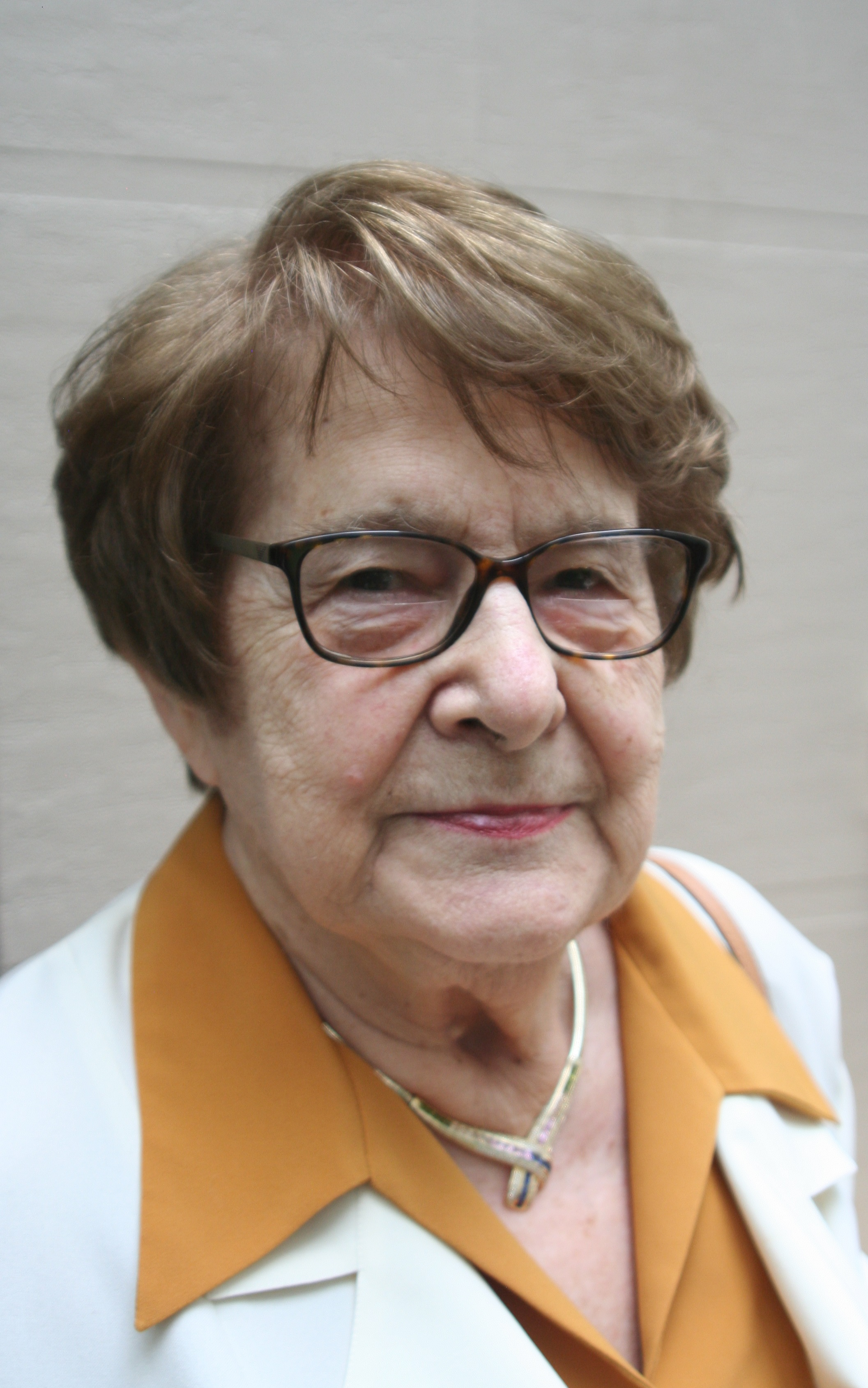
- Born: 21 May 1939; Warsaw, Second Polish Republic
- Died: 5 January 2025 (aged 85); Kraków, Poland
- Resting place: Rakowicki Cemetery, Kraków, Poland
- Education: Warsaw University of Life Sciences; Warsaw University of Technology
- Spouse: Antoni Jackowski (m. 1950)
- Awards: Gold Cross of Merit (1999)
- Scientific career
- Fields: Geography
- Workplaces: Polish Academy of Sciences; Babiogórski National Park; Polish Geographical Society; Urban Development Issues (UDI) journal Jagiellonian University
- Doctoral advisor: Stefan Myczkowski

Danuta Maria Ptaszycka-Jackowska (21 May 1939 – 5 January 2025) was a Polish geographer, landscape architect and educator. She contributed to the spatial development of the post World War II redesign of Warsaw and was involved in developing the buffer zone planning concept in Poland in the late 1970s. She was a member of the Polish Geographical Society [pl], a member of the Polish Academy of Science's Committee for the Development of Mountain Land and chaired the Scientific Council of Babiogórski National Park. She was a professor at the Institute of Geography and Spatial Management of Jagiellonian University in Kraków.

== Family and early life ==
Ptaszycka-Jackowska was born on 21 May 1939 in Warsaw, Second Polish Republic. Her parents were the architects Tadeusz Ptaszycki [pl] and Anna Ptaszycka [pl].

During the Nazi German Occupation of Poland (1939–1945) in World War II, Ptaszycka-Jackowska's father was a reserve lieutenant of the Polish Army and her mother was involved in the Women's Military Service of the Polish Home Army resistance movement. Alongside her grandmother and sisters, Ptaszycka-Jackowska was expelled from the family apartment in the Ochota, Warsaw, on 8 August 1944 and was sent to the Dulag 121 camp in Pruszków then to another camp in Łowicz. They managed to escape and survived the war.

== Career ==
After the war, Ptaszycka-Jackowska and her family lived in Wrocław, then moved to Kraków. She attended high school then studied landscape architecture at the Faculty of Horticulture of the Warsaw University of Life Sciences. From 1964 to 1966, she undertook her master's degree in spatial planning at the Faculty of Architecture [pl] of Warsaw University of Technology.

After graduating from university, Ptaszycka-Jackowska began her career working at the Warsaw Urban Planning Studio as a design assistant, where she contributed to the spatial development of the capital redesign plan. She was also involved in originating and developing the buffer zone planning concept in Poland in the late 1970s.

Ptaszycka-Jackowska completed her doctoral studies at the Faculty of Architecture of the Warsaw University of Technology in 1990. Her doctoral thesis was supervised by Stefan Myczkowski [pl]. She later undertook research trips to Algeria, Venezuela, Switzerland, France, Czech Republic and Slovakia.

From 1993, Ptaszycka-Jackowska was a member of the Polish Academy of Science's Committee for the Development of Mountain Land. From 1992 to 2000, Ptaszycka-Jackowska was an appraiser of the Minister of Environmental Protection, Natural Resources and Forestry in the field of nature protection. From 1996 to 1997, she participated in the work of an international team on the preparation of the concept of the transport system in the city of Częstochowa.

Ptaszycka-Jackowska researched the impact of religious tourism on the environment and wrote Jasna Góra Pilgrimage in the City and Region of Częstochowa (1998) with her husband Antoni Jackowski. She also published on cruises as a new branch of tourism to Poland.

From 2000, Ptaszycka-Jackowska was chair of the Scientific Council of Babiogórski National Park. In 2002, she published the book Światy Babiej Góry to commemorate the 25th anniversary of the establishment of the park.

From 2004, Ptaszycka-Jackowska was a member of the Polskie Towarzystwo Geograficzne (PTG, Polish Geographical Society) [pl]. From 2004 to 2013, she sat on the editorial board of the Urban Development Issues (UDI) journal. From 2006, she was a professor at the Institute of Geography and Spatial Management of Jagiellonian University.

== Death ==
Ptaszycka-Jackowska died on 5 January 2025 in Kraków, Poland, aged 85. She was buried at the Rakowicki Cemetery in Krakow. She was survived by her husband.

== Awards ==
- Honorary citizen of the Zawoja Commune
- Gold Cross of Merit (1999)
- Silver Badge of Merit for Spatial Management
