= Antoni Jackowski =

Polish human geographer (1935–2025)

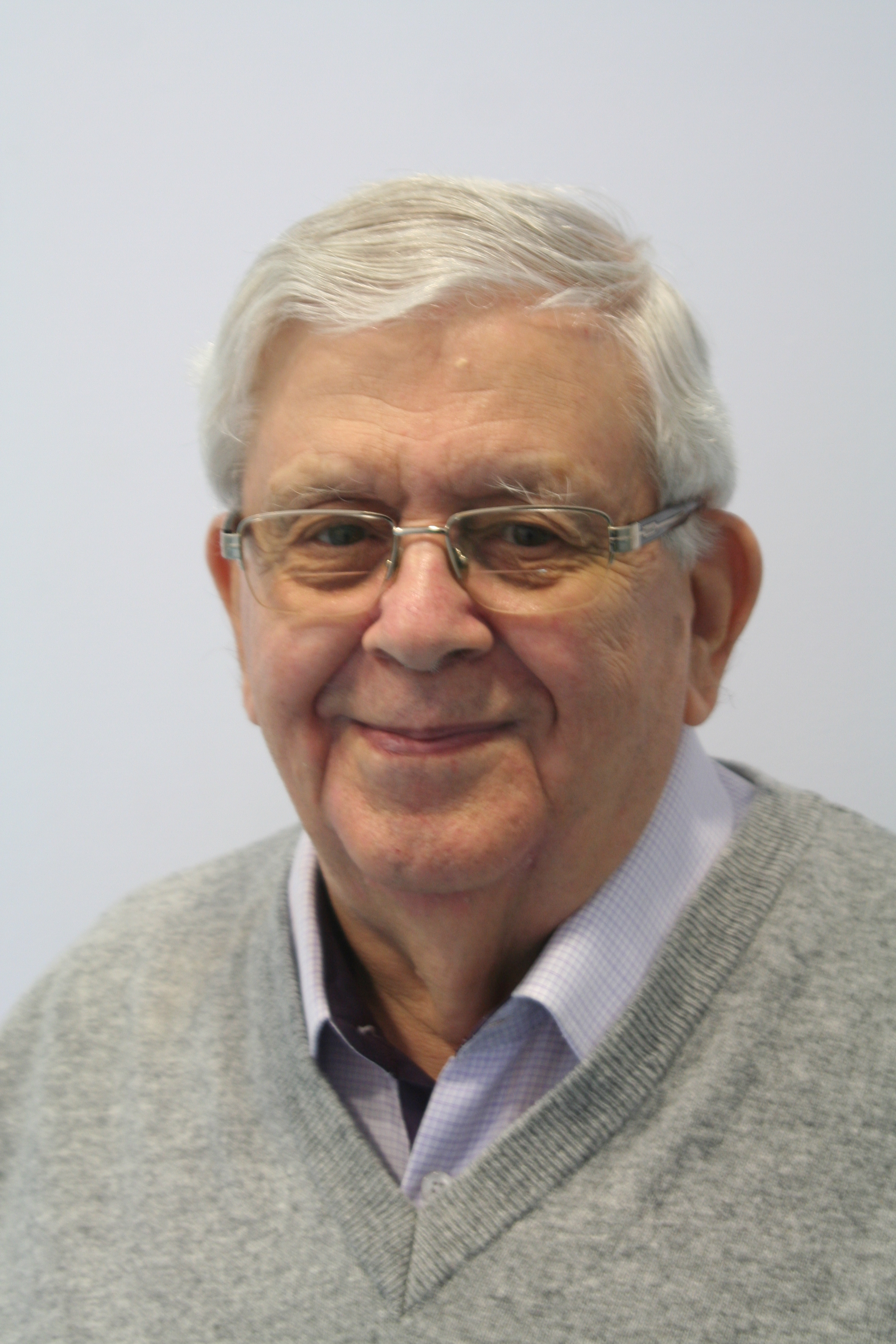
- Jackowski in 2015
- Born: 1 June 1935; Bruges, Belgium
- Died: 17 November 2025 (aged 90)
- Employer(s): Polish Geographical Society; Jagiellonian University
- Spouse: Danuta Ptaszycka-Jackowska

Antoni Jackowski (1 June 1935 – 17 November 2025) was a Polish human geographer.

== Life and career ==
Jackowski was born in Bruges, Belgium, on 1 June 1935. He was the Chairman of the Polish Geographical Society, Honorary Professor of the Jagiellonian University, Doctor Honoris Causa of the University of Prešov.

In the 1990s, he institutionalized the field of geography of religion in Poland, establishing a dedicated department at the Jagiellonian University and launching the academic journal Peregrinus Cracoviensis.

He was known for creating a new subdiscipline of geographical sciences in Poland – the geography of religion. He wrote Jasna Góra Pilgrimage in the City and Region of Częstochowa (1998) with his wife, Danuta Ptaszycka-Jackowska.

Jackowski died on 17 November 2025, at the age of 90.
