= Biosphere reserves of Poland =

List of biosphere reserves in Poland

Location of Biosphere Reserves in Poland

UNESCO Biosphere Reserves are environment-protected scientific-research institutions of international status that are created with the intent for conservation in a natural state the most typical natural complexes of biosphere, conducting background ecological monitoring, studying of the surrounding natural environment, its changes under the activity of anthropogenic factors.

Biosphere Preserves are created on the base of nature preserves or national parks including to their composition territories and objects of other categories of nature-preserving fund and other lands as well as including in the established order the World Network of Biosphere Reserves in the UNESCO framework "Man and the Biosphere Programme".

The focal point in Poland for the Biosphere Reserves is the Polish Academy of Sciences (PAS), Institute of Geography and Spatial Organisation.

== Reserves ==
There are currently ten such reserves in Poland, including trans-boundary reserves shared between Poland and neighboring countries.

- (Reserve POL 01) Babia Góra, Lesser Poland Voivodeship, 11,829 ha (29,230 acres), designated 1976, extended in 2001

The reserve is located on the border with Slovakia in the Western Beskidy Mountains. Babia Góra is the second highest massif (1,725 m (5,659 ft)) in Poland and forms part of the watershed boundary between the Baltic Sea and the Black Sea basins. There are four environments that occur as the altitude increases. The forest belt is divided into a lower belt (up to 1,150 m (3,770 ft)), consisting of forests of European beech (Fagus sylvatica), silver fir (Abies alba) and Carpathian spruce (Picea abies), and the upper belt (up to 1,390 m (4,560 ft)) consisting of Carpathian spruce forest. Above the forest is the subalpine belt (up to 1,650 m (5,410 ft)) with dwarf mountain pine (Pinetum mughi) and low-growth European blueberry (Vaccinium myrtillus). At the highest slopes is the alpine grassland belt (up to 1,725 m (5,659 ft)) consisting of lichen-covered siliceous bedrock with tussock-based grasses like (Festuca supina) and (Avenella flexuosa).

- (Reserve POL 02) Białowieża Forest, Podlaskie Voivodeship, 10,502 ha (25,950 acres), designated 1976

The reserve, in northeastern Poland, lies adjacent to the Belovezhskaya Pushcha Biosphere Reserve in Belarus. The forest complex, the last and largest remaining mixed deciduous primeval forest on the North European Plain, is situated in the transition between the hemiboreal and continental climate areas. The forest is composed of a mosaic of diverse communities, principally composed of grey willow (Salix cinerea), European hornbeam (Carpinus betulus), arctic dwarf birch (Betula humilis) English oak (Quercus robur), small-leaved lime (Tilia cordata), Scots pine (Pinus sylvestris), Norway spruce (Picea abies), which reaches its southern limits in the northern hemisphere here, and sessile oak (Quercus petraea), which reaches its northeastern limit here.

- (Reserve POL 03) Łuknajno Lake, Warmian-Masurian Voivodeship, 1,410 ha (3,500 acres), designated 1976

The reserve is a glacial lake typical of those located in the Masurian Lake District with an area of 6.8 square kilometres (2.6 sq mi), and a maximum depth of 3 metres (9.8 ft). The lake is connected with nearby Sniardwy Lake by a channel. The site is a breeding ground for water birds such as grebes, water rail (Rallus aquaticus), moorhen, grey heron (Ardea cinerea), bearded reedling (Panurus biarmicus), white-tailed eagle (Haliaeetus albicilla), osprey (Pandion haliaetus), red kite, great cormorant and black tern (Chlidonias niger). The lake has been a protected location since 1937 as a habitat of the mute swan (Cygnus olor), as every year there are a dozen to tens of dozens of nesting pairs, and during moulting they arrive in numbers reaching up to 2,000 birds.

- (Reserve POL 04) Słowiński, Pomeranian Voivodeship, 20,790 ha (51,400 acres), designated 1976

The reserve consists of set of dunes, brackish lakes, bogs, and wetland forests on the southern Baltic Sea coast between Łeba and Rowy, Poland. The coastal aeolian processes have produced some of the most extensive and active mobile sand dunes, which can reach 30 m (98 ft) high, on the Baltic Sea. Coastal erosion and other geological processes lead to the creation of sand-bars, forming brackish lakes and bogs. The area consists of a series of vegetation zones going from the sand communities of the coastline towards the forests of the mainland. The forest includes beech (Fagus sylvatica), birch (Betula pubescens), alder (Alnus glutinosa), pine and oak. It is an important way station for migrating wader birds and waterbirds such as geese, ducks and swans. The white-tailed eagle (Haliaeetus albicilla) and other birds nest at the site.

- (Reserve POL-SLO-UKR 01) East Carpathian, Subcarpathian Voivodeship, 113,846 ha (281,320 acres) in Poland, designated 1992 and extended 1998, Joint with Slovakia and Ukraine

The reserve is located in the Bieszczady Mountains on the border with Slovakia and Ukraine. There are four distinct altitude-dependent vegetation ecosystems in the mountains starting with beech forest (Fagetum sylvaticae), followed by mixed forests of beech and silver fir (Abies alba), forested areas of green alder (Alnetum viridis), and finally a belt of treeless poloniny, a subalpine meadows dominated by grasses. Over 100 species of birds live in the area such as the black stork (Ciconia nigra) and the golden eagle (Aquila chrysaetos).

- (Reserve POL 05) Kampinos Forest, Masovian Voivodeship, 76,232 ha (188,370 acres), designated 2000

The reserve is located on the North European Plain, north-east of Warsaw, parallel to the Vistula River and is characterized by a high diversity of lowland habitats with dune belts separated by swamp areas and a mixture of forest types. The forests are principally composed of a mixture of grey willow (Salix cinerea), European hornbeam (Carpinus betulus), arctic dwarf birch (Betula humilis) English oak (Quercus robur), small-leaved lime (Tilia cordata) and Scots pine (Pinus sylvestris).

- (Reserve CZE-POL 01) Karkonosze, Subcarpathian Voivodeship, 5,575 ha (13,780 acres) in Poland, designated 1992, Joint with Slovakia

The reserve is part of the Western Sudetes mountains stretching from south-central Poland along the northern border of the Czech Republic to eastern Germany. The mountains are located at the watershed dividing the Baltic Sea and North Sea basins. The area is known for its high biodiversity in four altitudinal vegetation belts, from submontane to alpine. The river valleys and lower layers form the sub-montane zone made up of forests of European beech (Fagus sylvatica), silver fir (Abies alba) and Carpathian spruce (Picea Abies). The higher parts form the montane vegetation zone characterized by forested areas of Carpathian spruce (Picea Abies). Above 1,250 to 1,350 m (4,100 to 4,430 ft) is the subalpine zone, which is marked by dwarf mountain pine (Pinus mugo), mat-grass meadows and subarctic high moors. There are three subalpine bogs that support an extensive algal community important for migratory birds and raptors. The alpine vegetation zone, is characterized by large rocky deserts with herbaceous perennials such as Carici (rigidae)-Nardetum and Festucetum supinae.

- (Reserve POL-SLO 01) Tatra Mountains, Subcarpathian Voivodeship, 17,906 ha (44,250 acres) in Poland, designated 1992, Joint with Slovakia

The reserve covers areas on each side of the border between Poland and Slovakia. The area contains a number of natural features such as a dwarf pine belt, alpine meadows, lakes and rocky peaks. The area consists of temperate broadleaf forests or woodlands made up of mixed beech (Fagus sylvatica) forest with fir (Abies alba) and sycamore (Acer pseudoplatanus). Higher up in the mountains this transitions to forests of silver fir (Abies alba) and Carpathian spruce (Picea Abies) until the timber line (1,500 to 1,550 m (4,920 to 5,090 ft)). Above the forest is the subalpine zone (1,550 to 1,850 m (5,090 to 6,070 ft)) with dwarf mountain pine (Pinetum mughi), Sorbus aucuparia and Betula carpatica. The alpine zone consists of grasses and low-growth herbaceous groundcover.

- West Polesie, Lublin Voivodeship, 139,917 ha (345,740 acres) in Poland, designated 2002 and extended 2012, Joint with Belarus and Ukraine

The reserve comprises a vast open lowland landscape with a mosaic of swamps, moors, lakes, rivers and forests located between the basins of the Bug and Wieprz rivers. The site is part of the European Ecological Corridor of the Bug River. The location supports bird species including raptors such as lesser spotted eagle (Aquila pomarina), hen harrier (Circus cyaneus) and Montagu's harrier (Circus pygargus) and birds such as aquatic warbler (Acrocephalus paludicola), marsh sandpiper (Tringa stagnatilis) and Eurasian cranes (Grus grus). The area is considered to be an important crossing point for migratory birds. The north–south flyways and east–west flyways of birds meet in the region. The areas consists of boreal Scots pine (Pinus sylvestris) forests, black alder (Alnus glutinosa) wetland forests, meadows and peatbog (raised bog, transitional bog and fen) ecosystems.

- (Reserve POL 07) Tuchola Forest, Pomeranian Voivodeship, 319,500 ha (790,000 acres), designated 2010

The reserve covers one of the largest forests in Poland, containing mainly Scots pine (Pinus sylvestris). The landforms of the area were sculpted by a glacier that retreated at the end of the last glacial age creating characteristically long ribbon lakes. Additionally there are large clusters of inland sand dunes. There are extensive areas of peat bogs formed as a result of the overgrowing of the shallower lakes. A number of species of birds live in the area such as the black stork (Ciconia nigra), black grouse (Tetrao tetrix), wood grouse (Tetrao urogallus) and peregrine falcon (Falco peregrinus).
