= Babia Góra =

Massif in southern Poland

- Babia hora
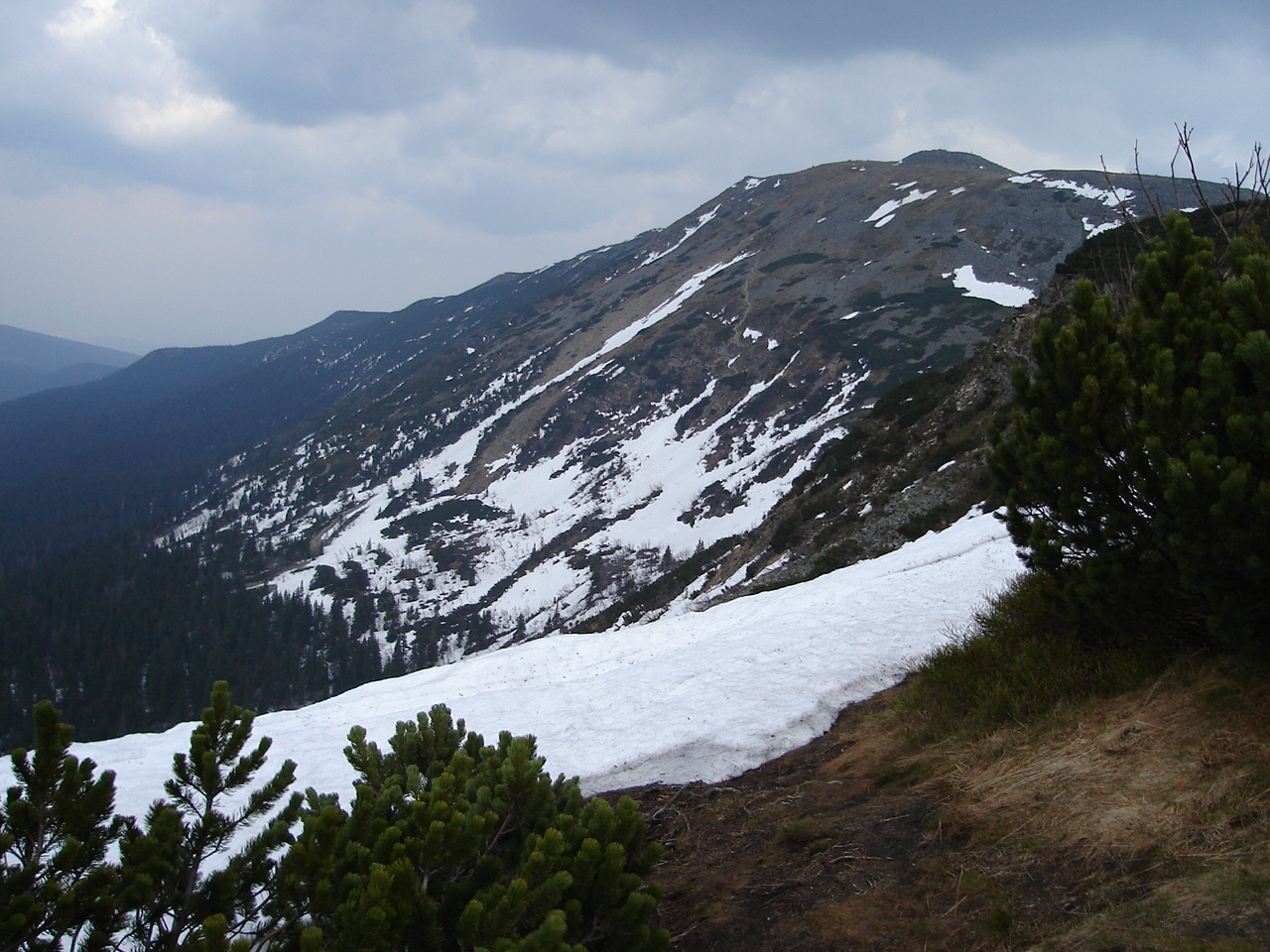
- Western view of Babia Góra in May

Highest point
- Elevation: 1,725 m (5,659 ft)
- Prominence: 1,071 m (3,514 ft)
- Listing: Ribu
- Coordinates: 49°35′N 19°32′E

Geography
- Location within Lesser Poland Voivodeship Location within Poland Location within Žilina Region Location within Slovakia
- Location: Poland / Slovakia
- Parent range: Żywiec Beskids, Oravské Beskydy, Carpathians

Climbing
- First ascent: 1782 by Jowin Fryderyk Bystrzycki
- Easiest route: Hike

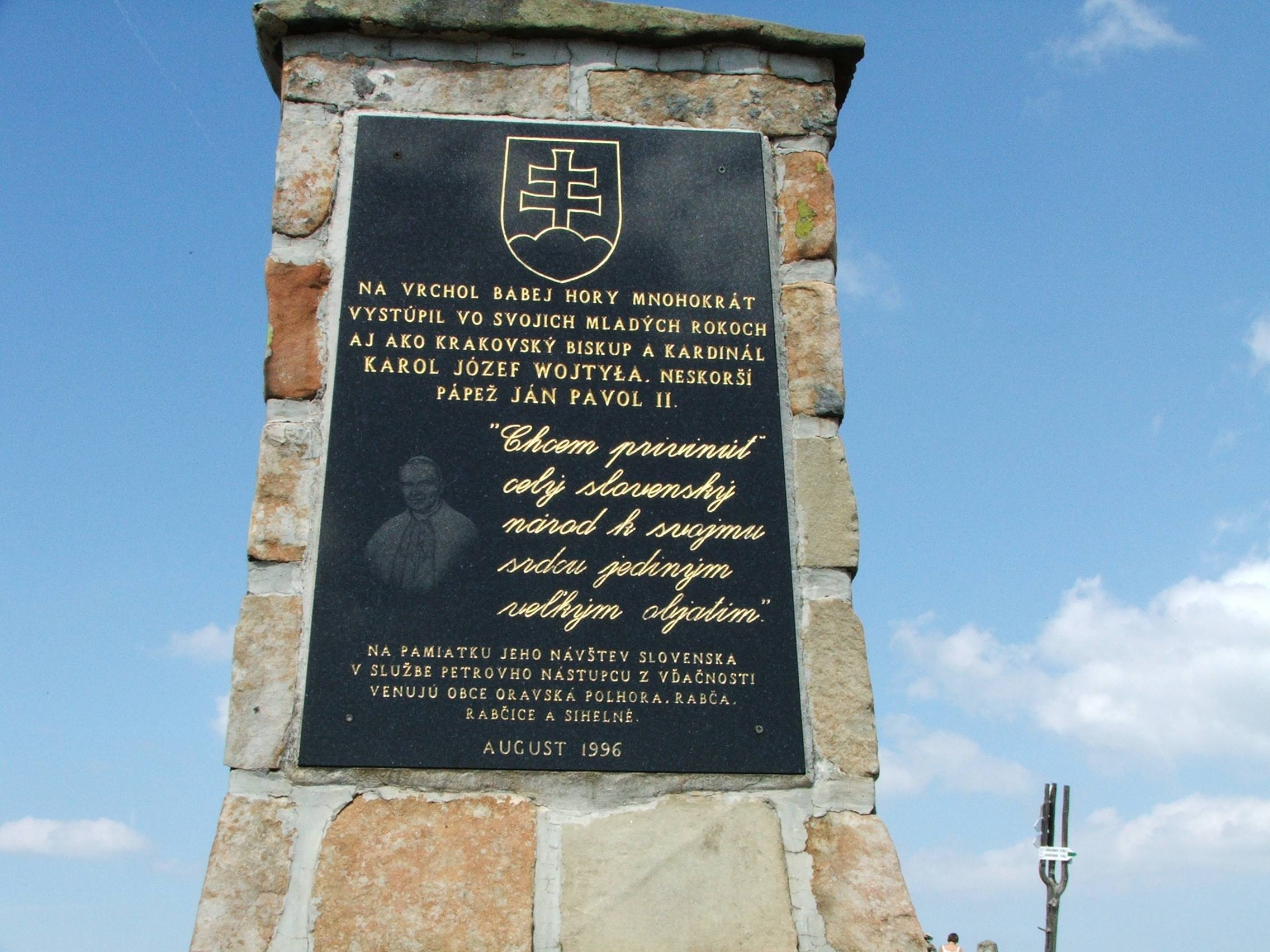
Babia hora memorial of John Paul II

Babia Góra [ˈbabʲa ˈɡura] (in Polish), or Babia hora (in Slovak) is a massif situated on the border between Poland and Slovakia in the Western Beskid Mountains. The name is also applied to the culmination of the massif, Diablak ("Devil's Peak"), which is also the highest peak of this part of the Carpathian Mountains, at 1,725 metres (5,659 ft) above sea level.

== History ==
The first historical mentions of the massif date back to the 15th century, when it first mentioned in the writings of Jan Długosz. It was only in the 19th century that the area was explored and chronicled in greater depth, with the first known mountain hut constructed in 1905.

== Nature ==
Gentle from the south, steep from the north, Babia Góra is home to brown bear, Eurasian lynx, gray wolf and other species; as well as alpine flora endemic at this altitude. The first attempts to protect the area were made in the 1930s. In 1933 the Nature Reserve of Babia Góra was established on the Polish side. Later, in 1954, Babia Góra National Park (Babiogórski Park Narodowy) was established with an area of 17.04 km^{2}. In 1976 it became one of the first Biosphere Reserves in the world. For a long time Babia Góra National Park was the smallest of the Polish national parks. In 1997 it was enlarged to 33.92 km^{2} and a buffer zone was created of 84.37 km^{2}. Within the park, 10.62 km^{2} is under strict protection. There are calls for strengthening of cross-border cooperation with Slovakia to better protect the fragile environment of the mountain.

== Climate ==
Babia Góra is sometimes nicknamed Matka Niepogód (Mother of Bad Weather). It is very susceptible to weather changes primarily due to the frequent winds that regularly hit the area. The mountain also experiences a strong inversion. Snow can cover the massif for over 200 days every year. In May 2016, a climber was killed by lightning while attempting to descend the mountain when a thunderstorm approached.

== Hiking and skiing ==
Although generally relatively easy to hike, Babia Góra can be reached by a more difficult yellow route called Perć Akademików (Academics' Path). Today, despite (or perhaps because of) steep climbs, chains and metal steps fixed to the rocks along sections of the trail, it is very popular with hikers.

The whole Babia Góra National Park is a strict nature reserve: skitouring, for example, was only permitted from 2022 onwards and only if certain weather and snow conditions were met.

== Gallery ==
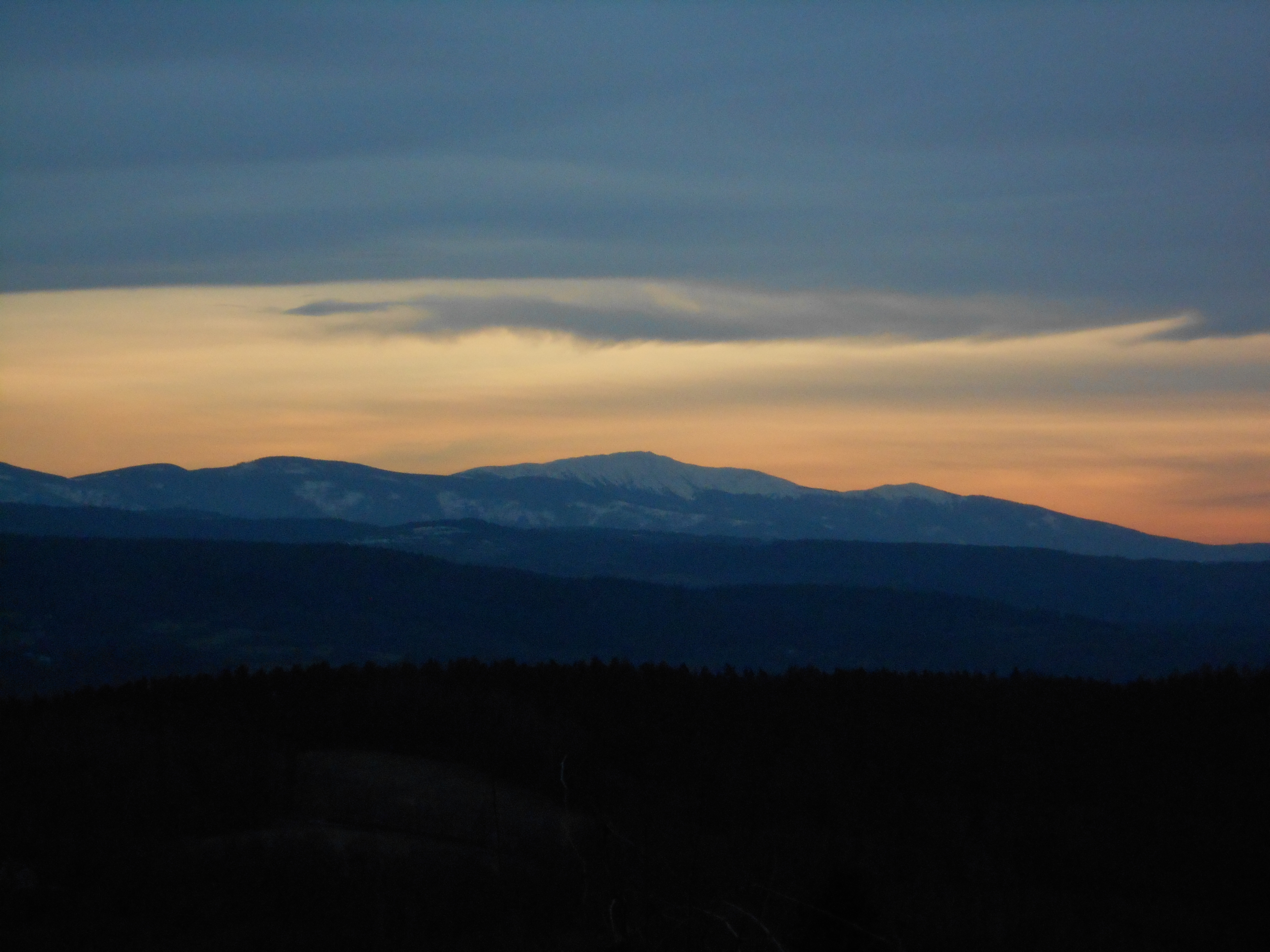
Witches Mountain from Mogilany

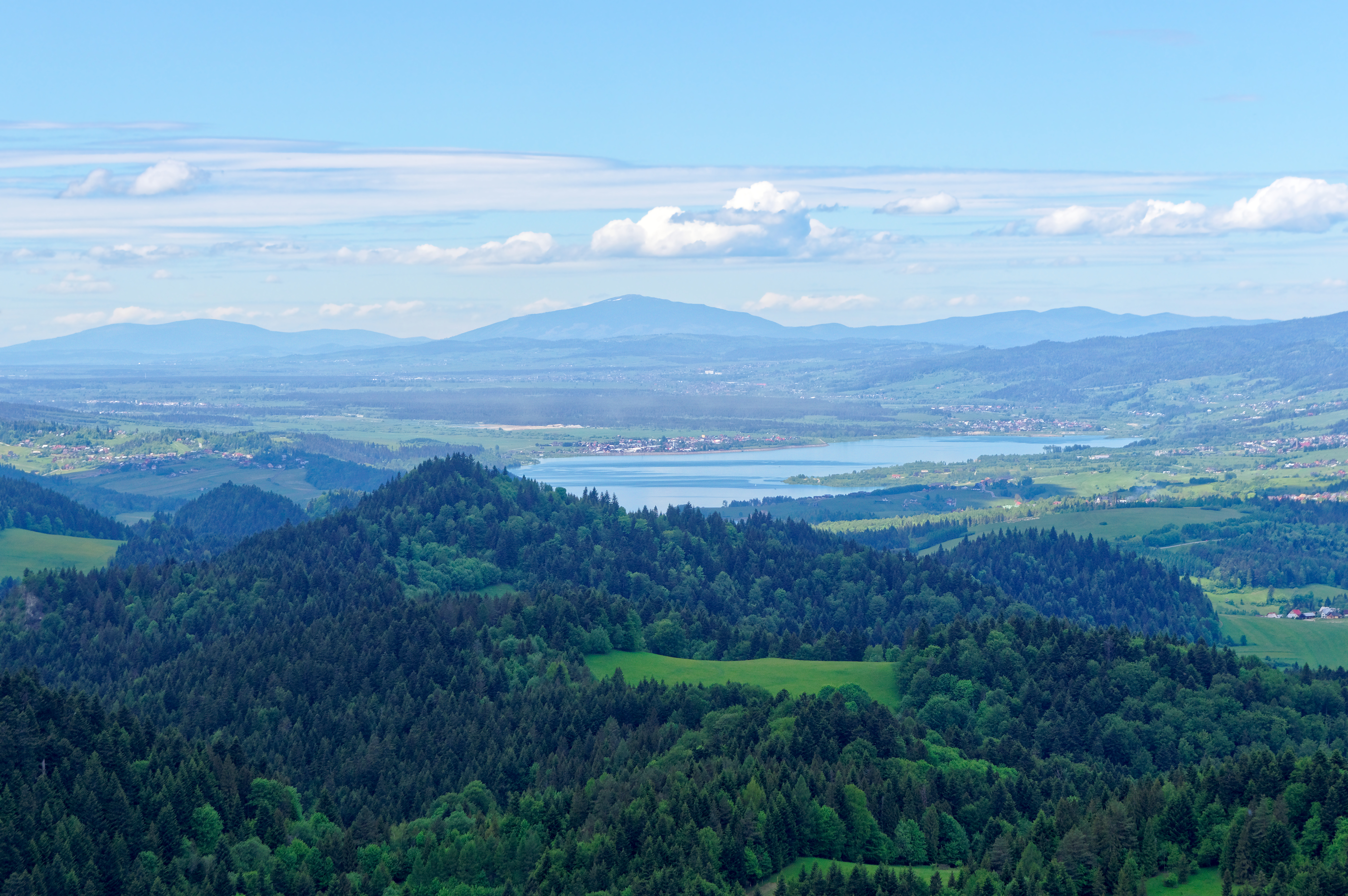
View of Babia Góra from Trzy Korony

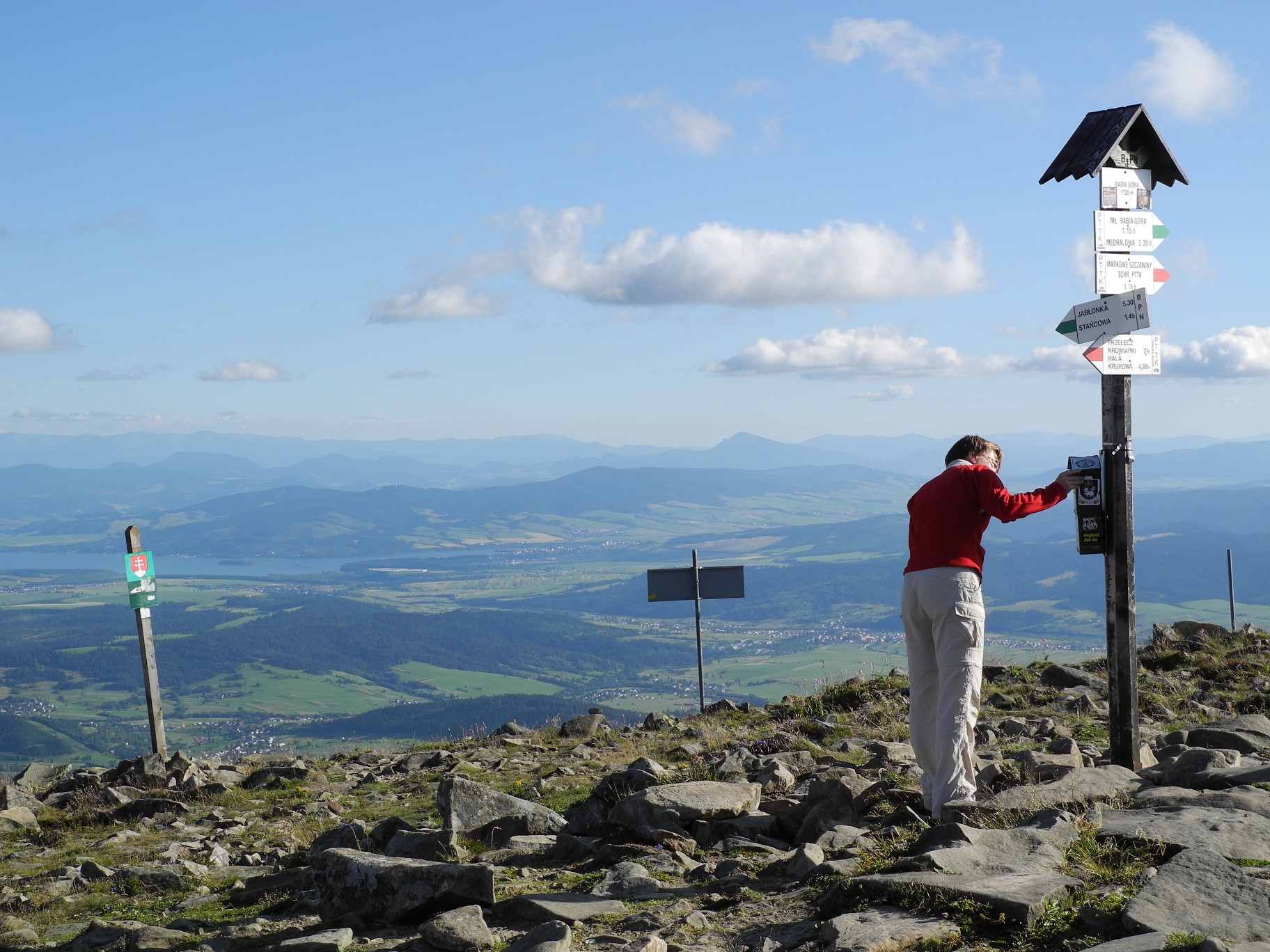
Babia Góra

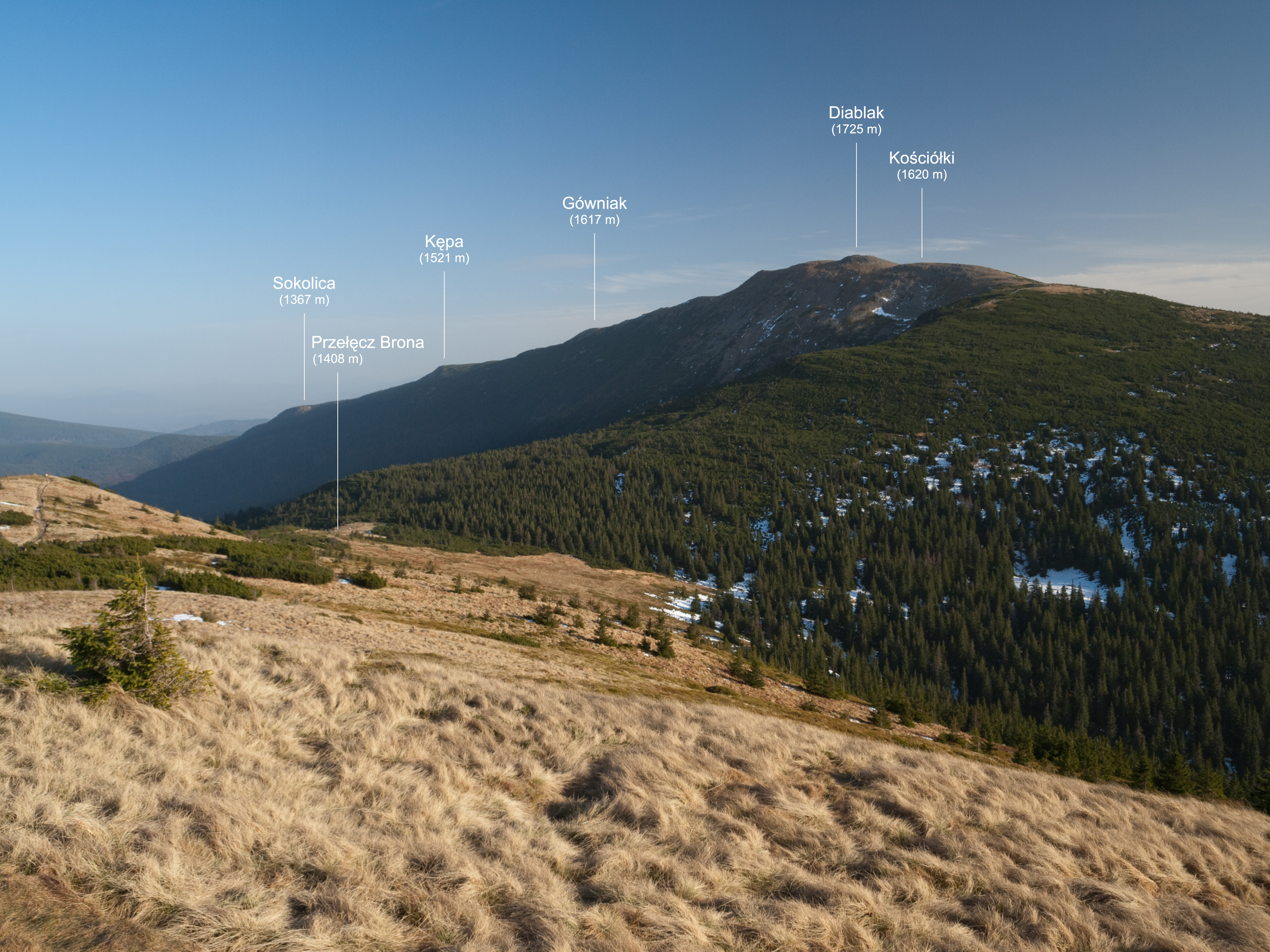
Babia Góra massif

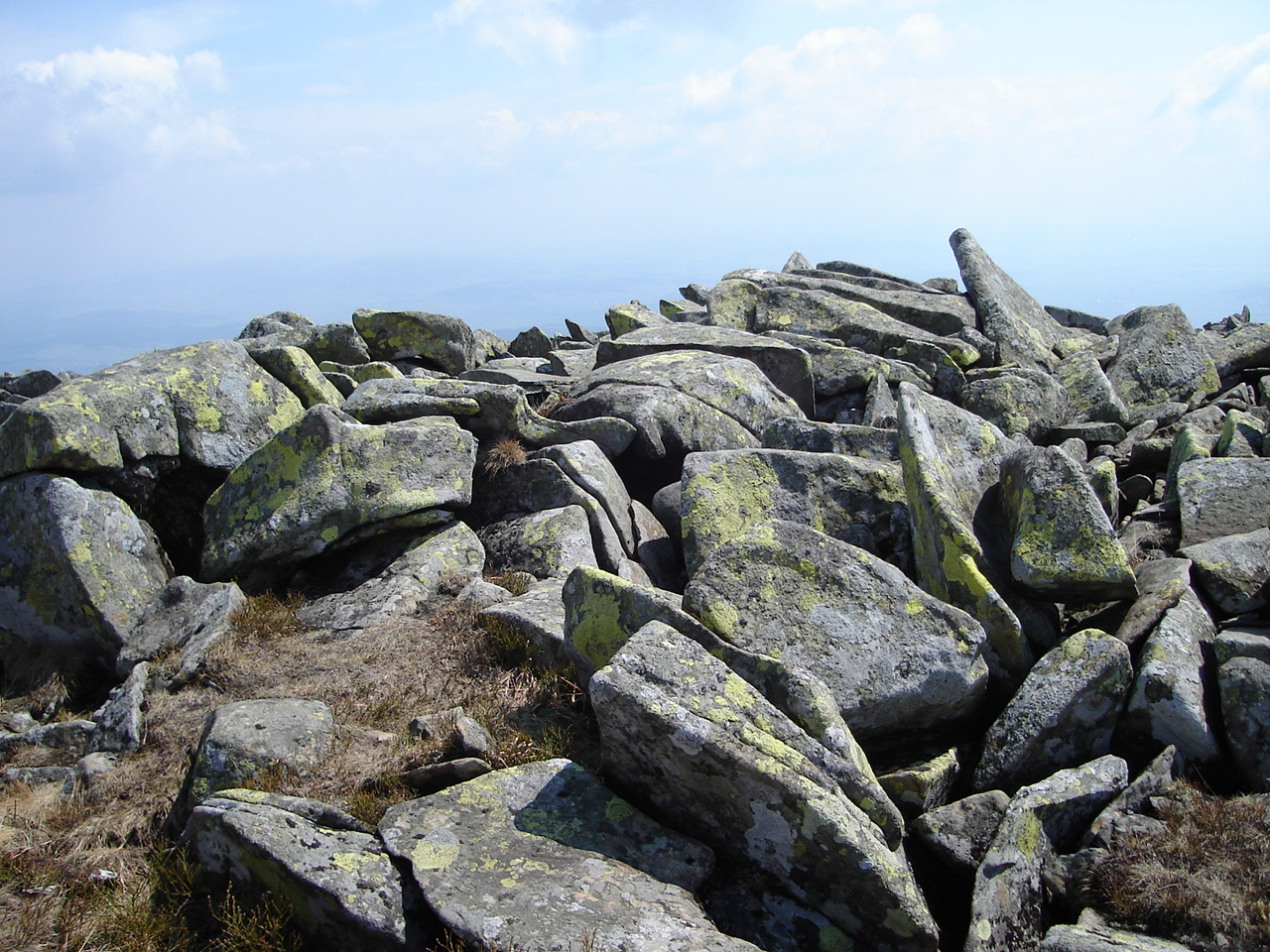
Lichen-covered stone slabs on the top

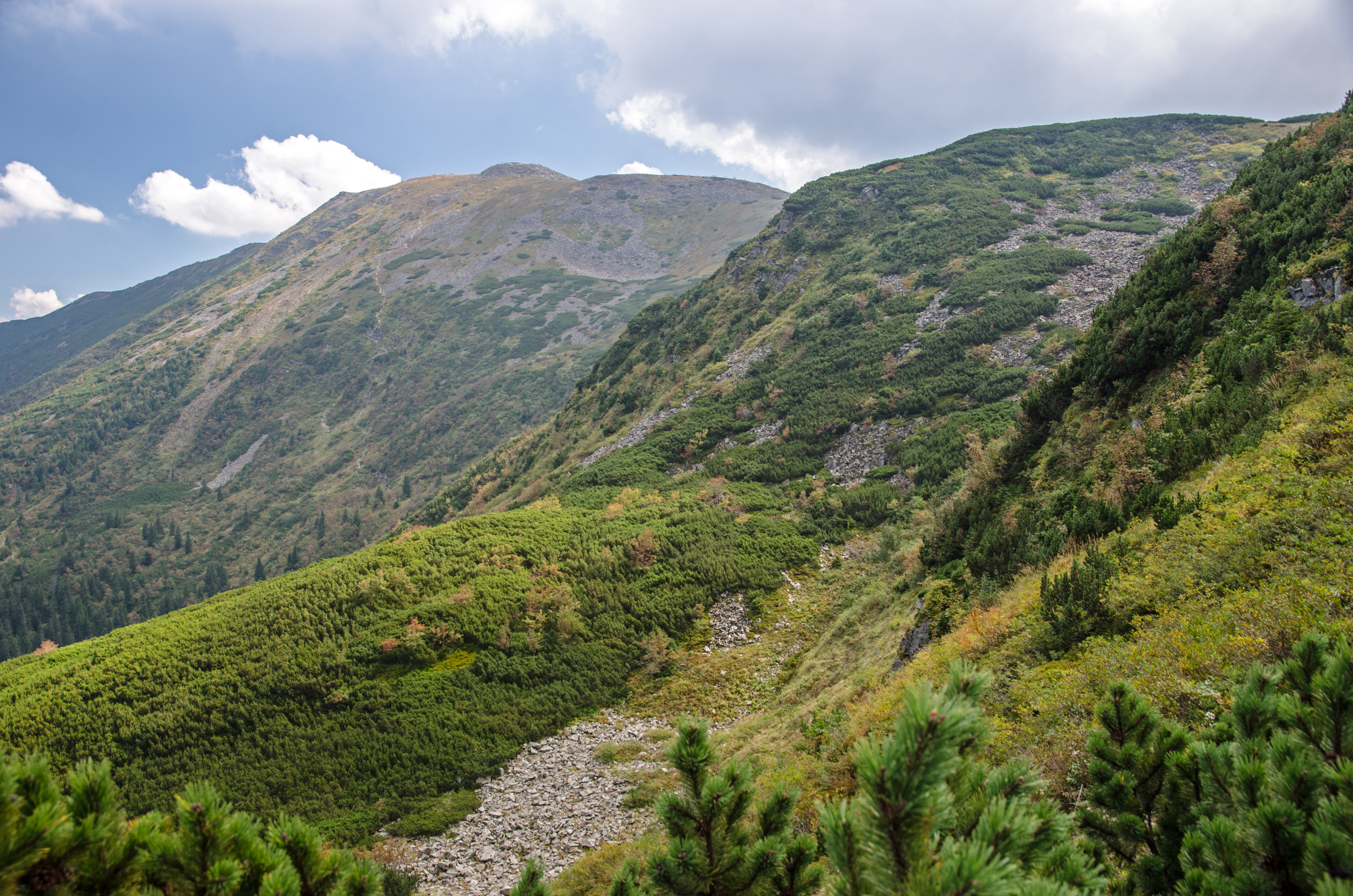
The Babia Gora Biosphere Reserve

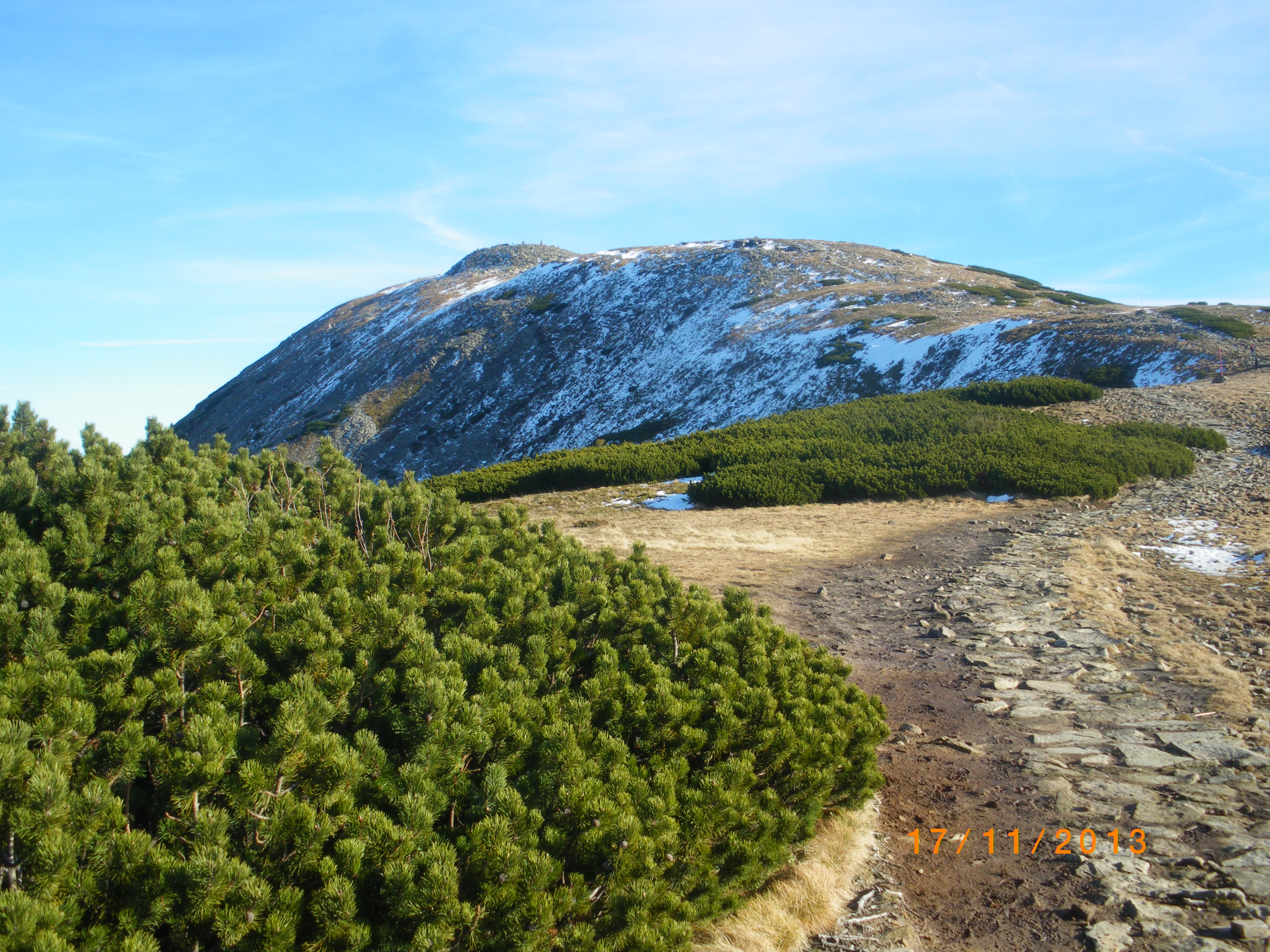
Diablak seen from Brona Pass

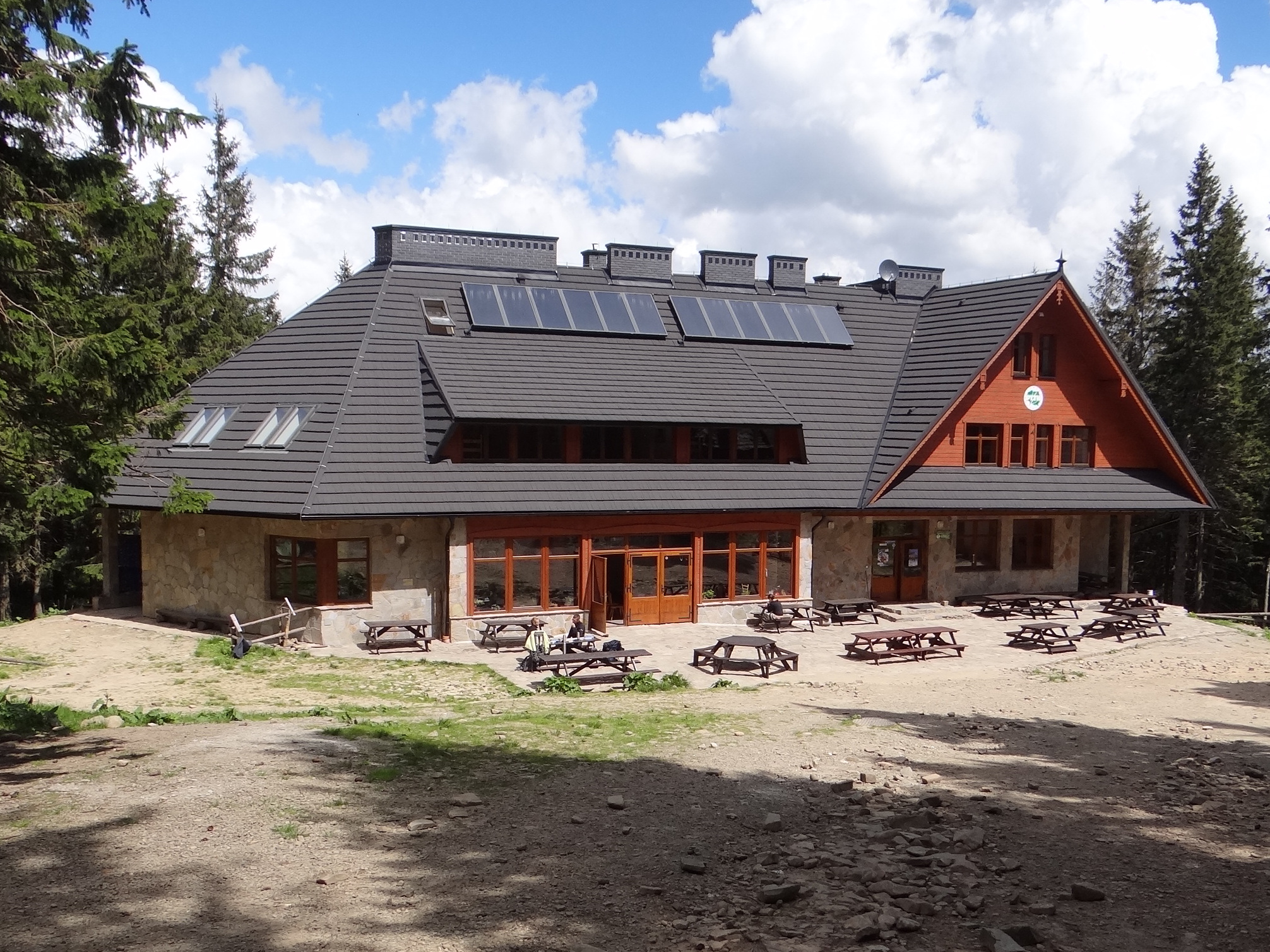
Mountain hut

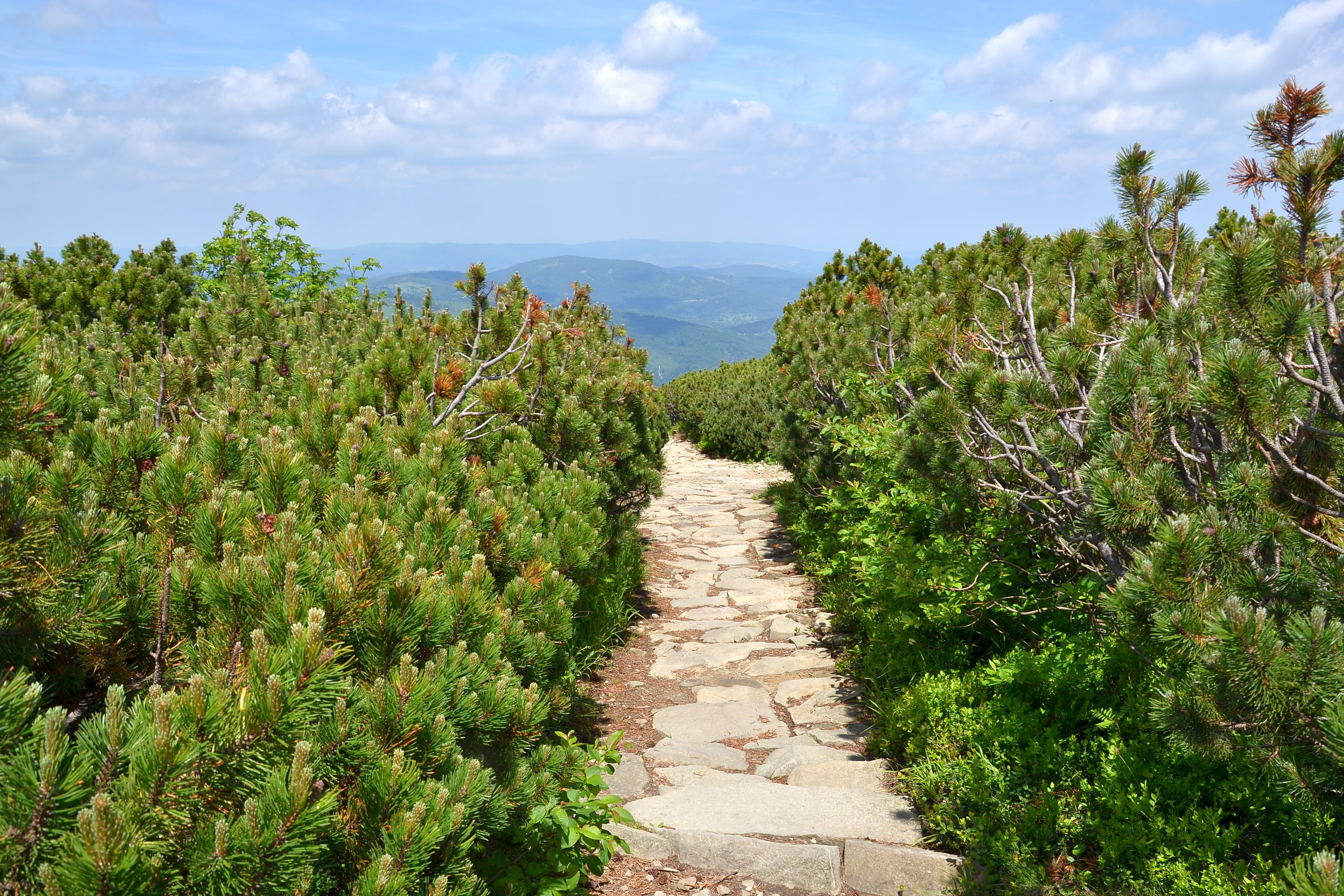
Markowe Szczawiny

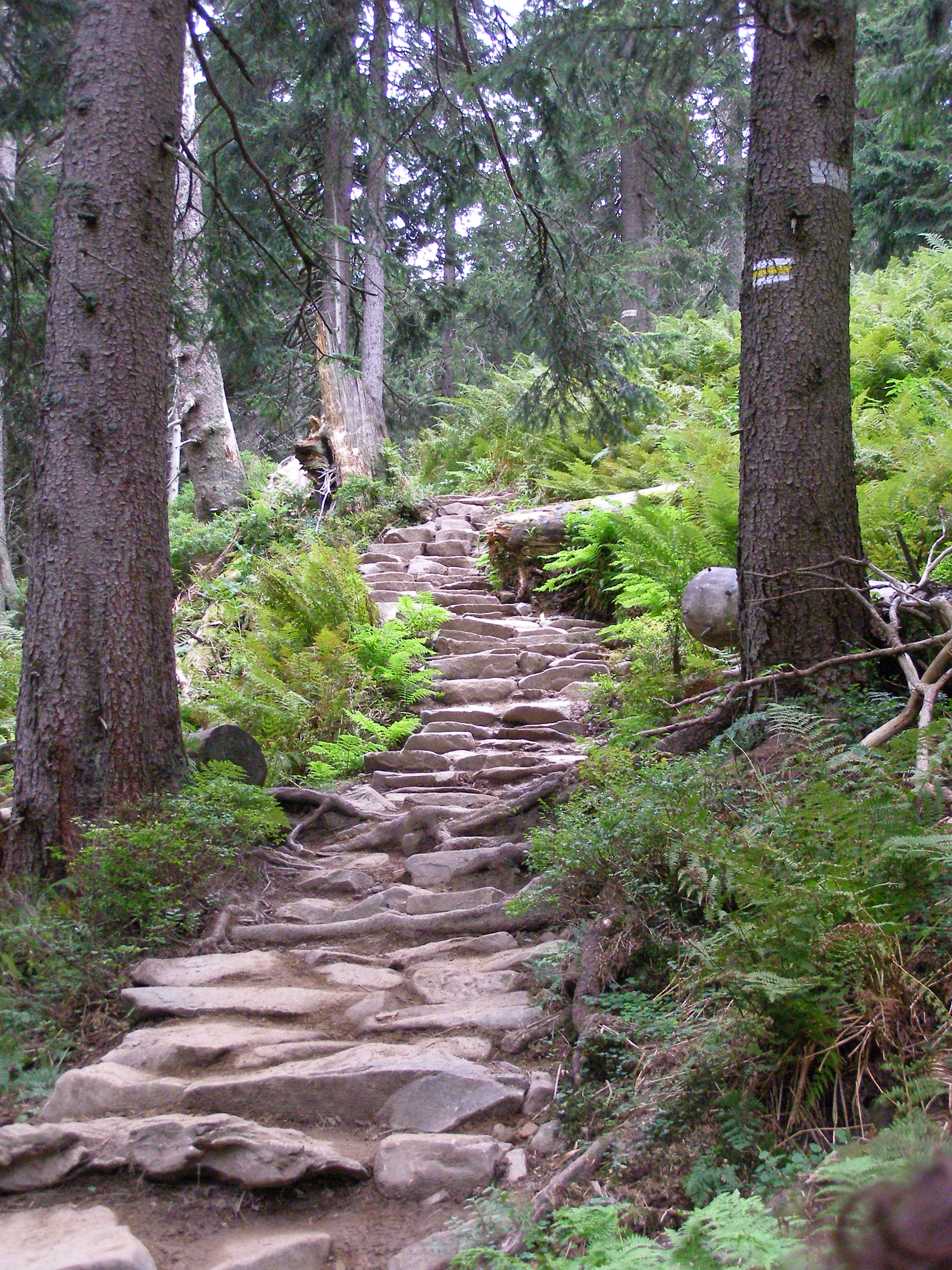
Mountain trail leading to the peak of Babia Góra

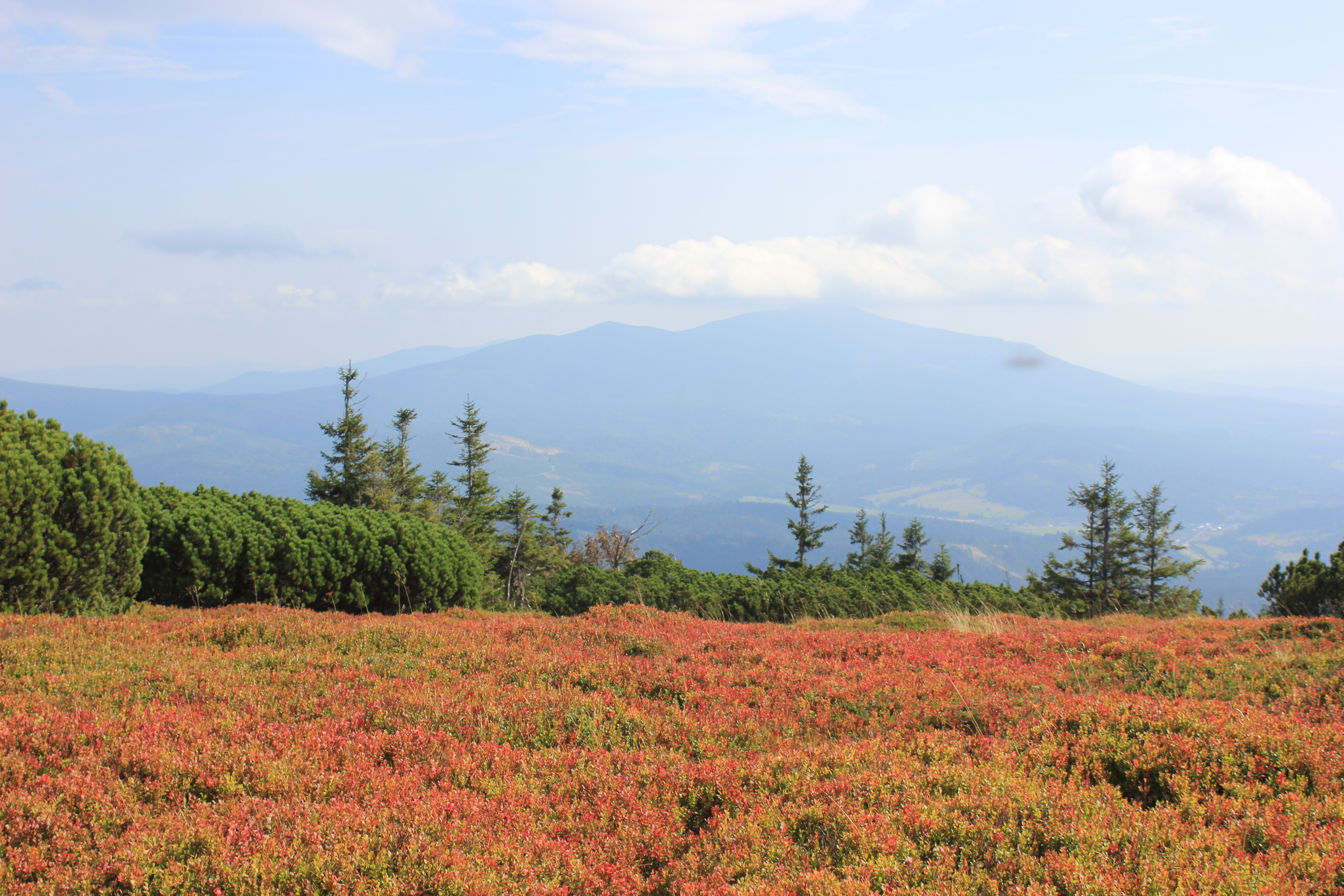
Panorama of Beskid Żywiecki featuring Babia Góra

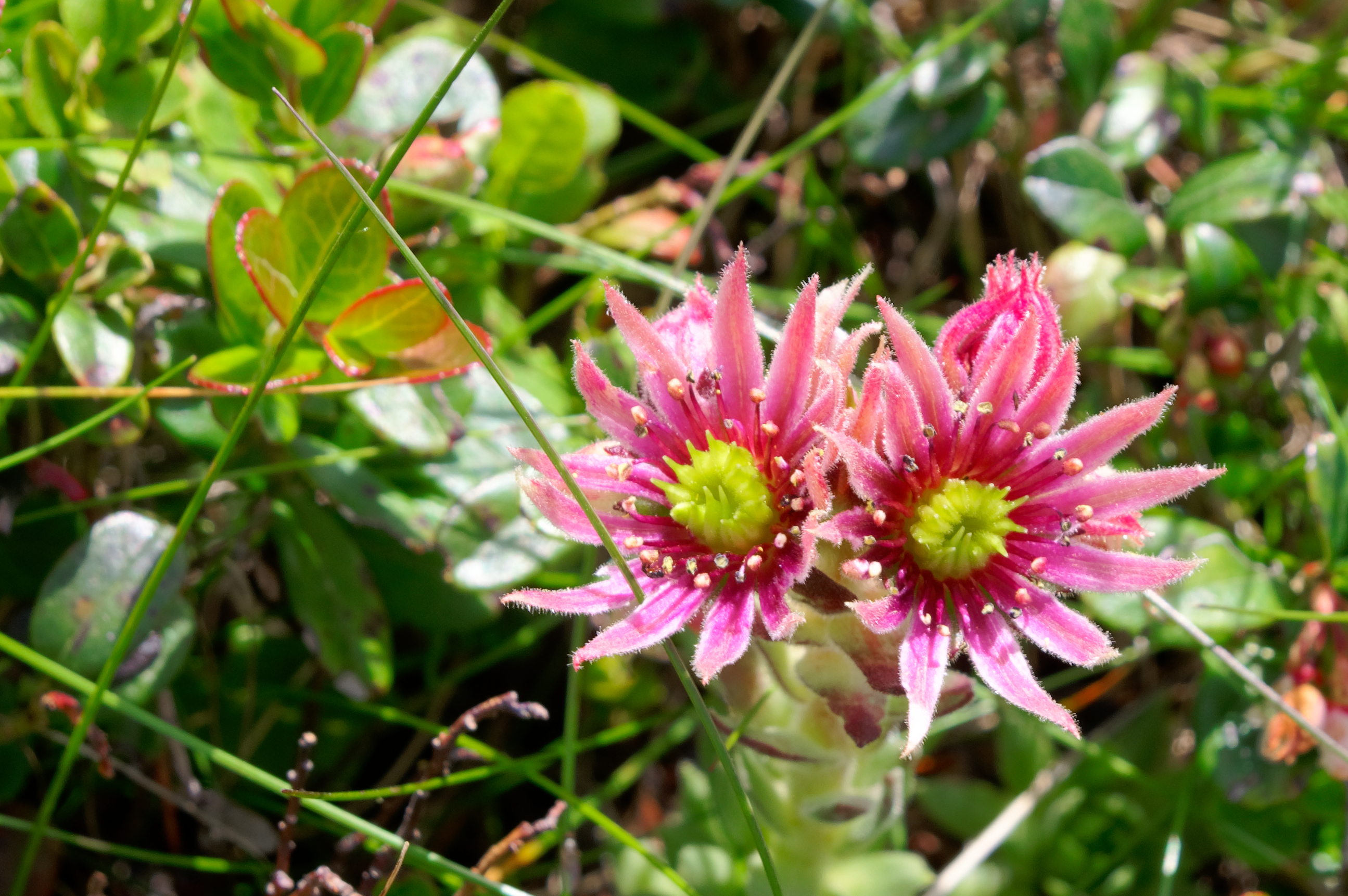
Mountain houseleek on Babia Góra

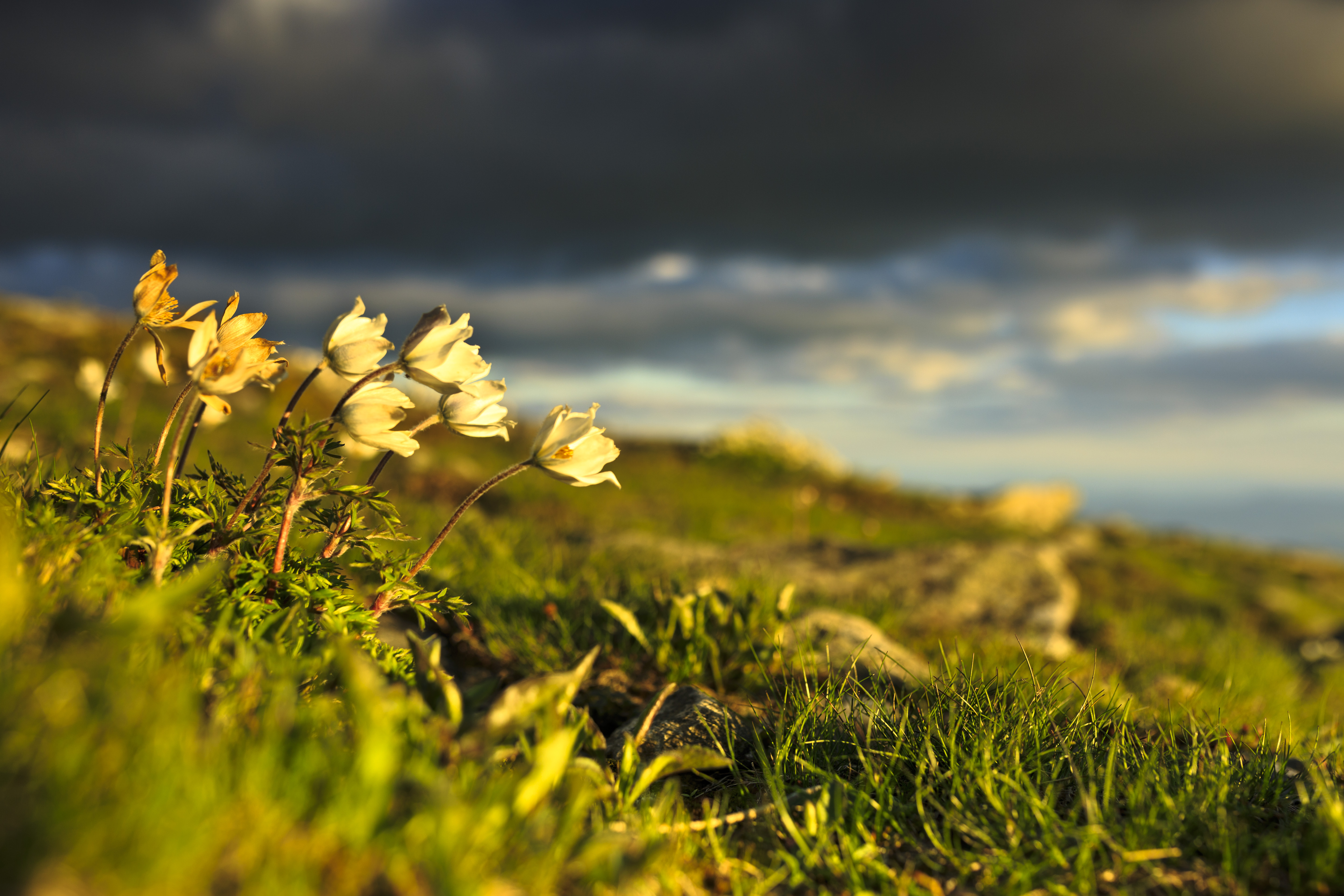
Alpine pasqueflower

== See also ==
- List of national parks of Poland
- List of national parks of Slovakia
- List of biosphere reserves in Poland
