= Babia Góra National Park =

National park in southern Poland

Coordinates: 49°35′18.05″N 19°32′22.92″E

- Babiogórski Park Narodowy
- IUCN category II (national park)
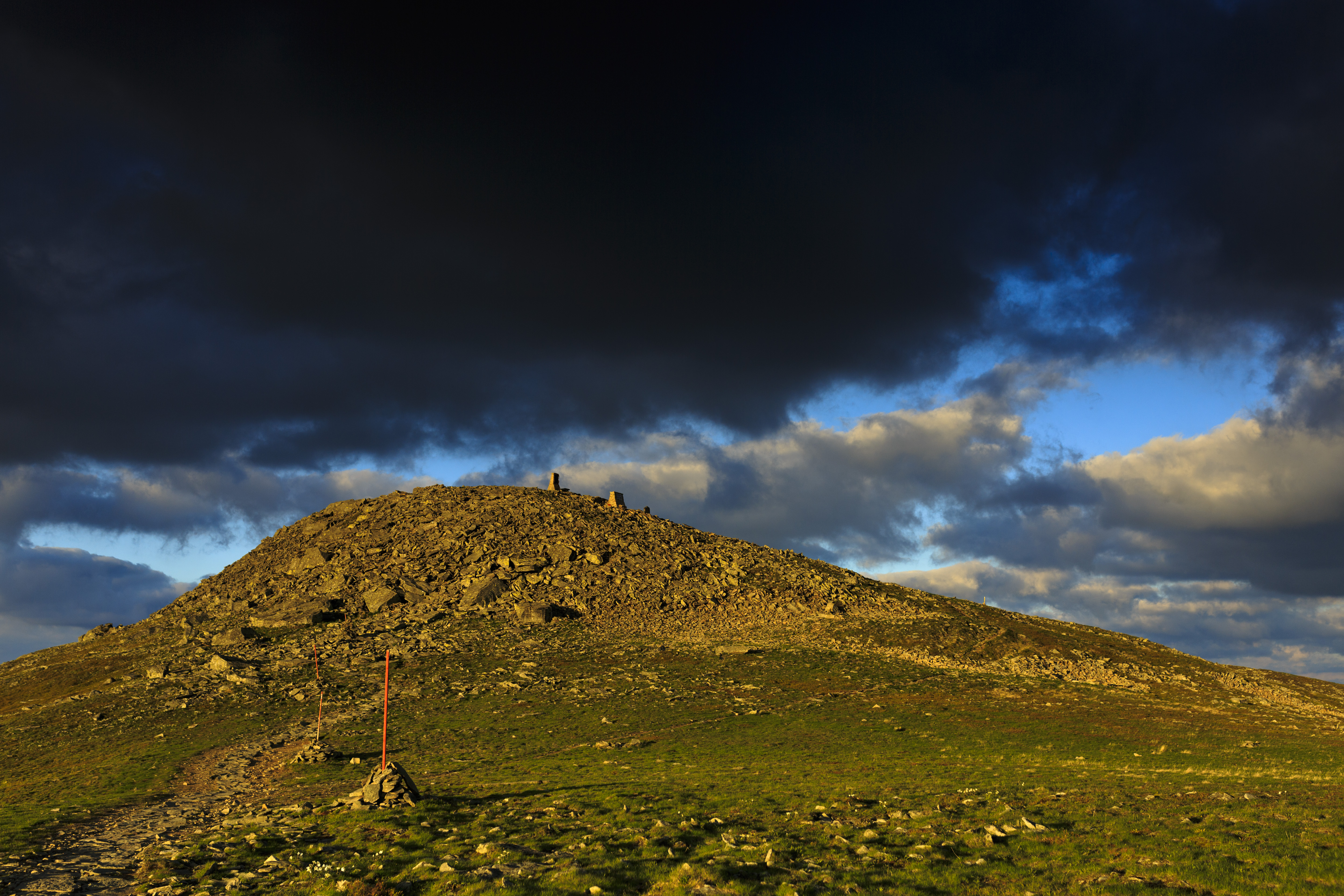
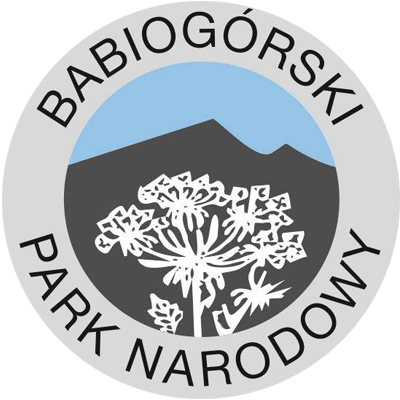
- Babia Góra Mountain Park logo with Apiaceae (Laserpitium archangelica)
- Interactive map of Babia Góra National Park
- Location: Lesser Poland Voivodeship, Poland
- Area: 33.92 km^{2} (13.10 mi^{2})
- Established: 1954
- Governing body: Ministry of the Environment
- Website: Official website

Babia Góra National Park (Polish: Babiogórski Park Narodowy) is one of 23 national parks in Poland. It is located in the southern part of the country, in Lesser Poland Voivodeship, on the border with Slovakia. The park's headquarters are in Zawoja. A Nature Reserve covering roughly the same area as the modern-day national park was established in 1933, and the national park itself was officially established on October 30, 1954. Since 1976, UNESCO has designated it as a biosphere reserve.

The park covers an area of 33.92 square kilometres (13.10 sq mi), approximately 85% of which is forested. It includes the northern and part of the southern side of the Babia Góra massif. The massif's main peak (known as Diablak), is the highest point of the Orava Beskids mountain range at 1,725 metres (5,659 ft). The Slovak side of the massif is primarily part of the Horná Orava Protected Landscape Area.

== Fauna ==
- 105 species of birds (including woodpeckers and eagle owls)
- Animals such as deer, lynx, wolves and bears
- Insects, especially beetles, including some that are unique to the area

== Gallery ==
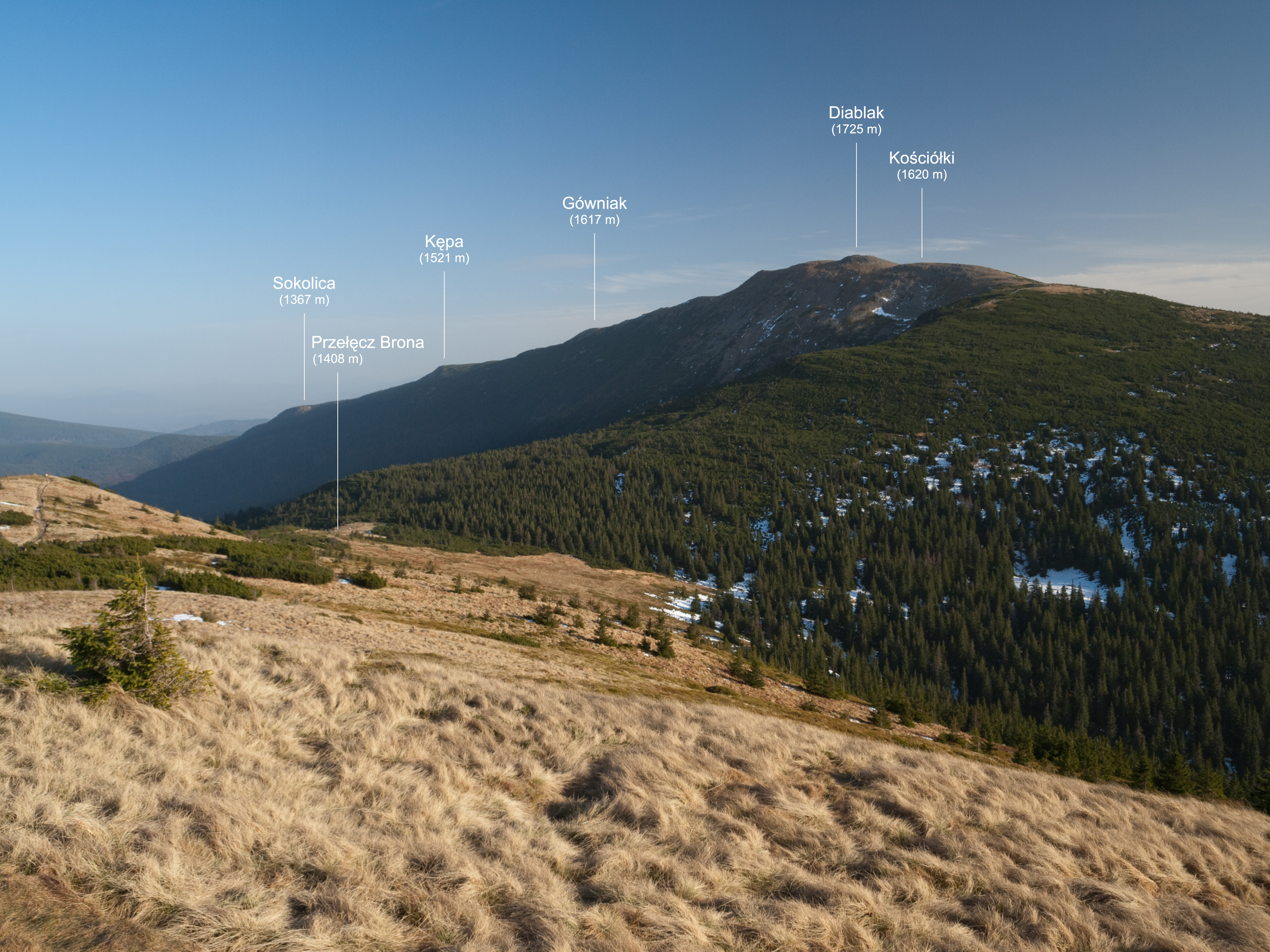
Babia Gora (1725 m), the highest peak of the national park

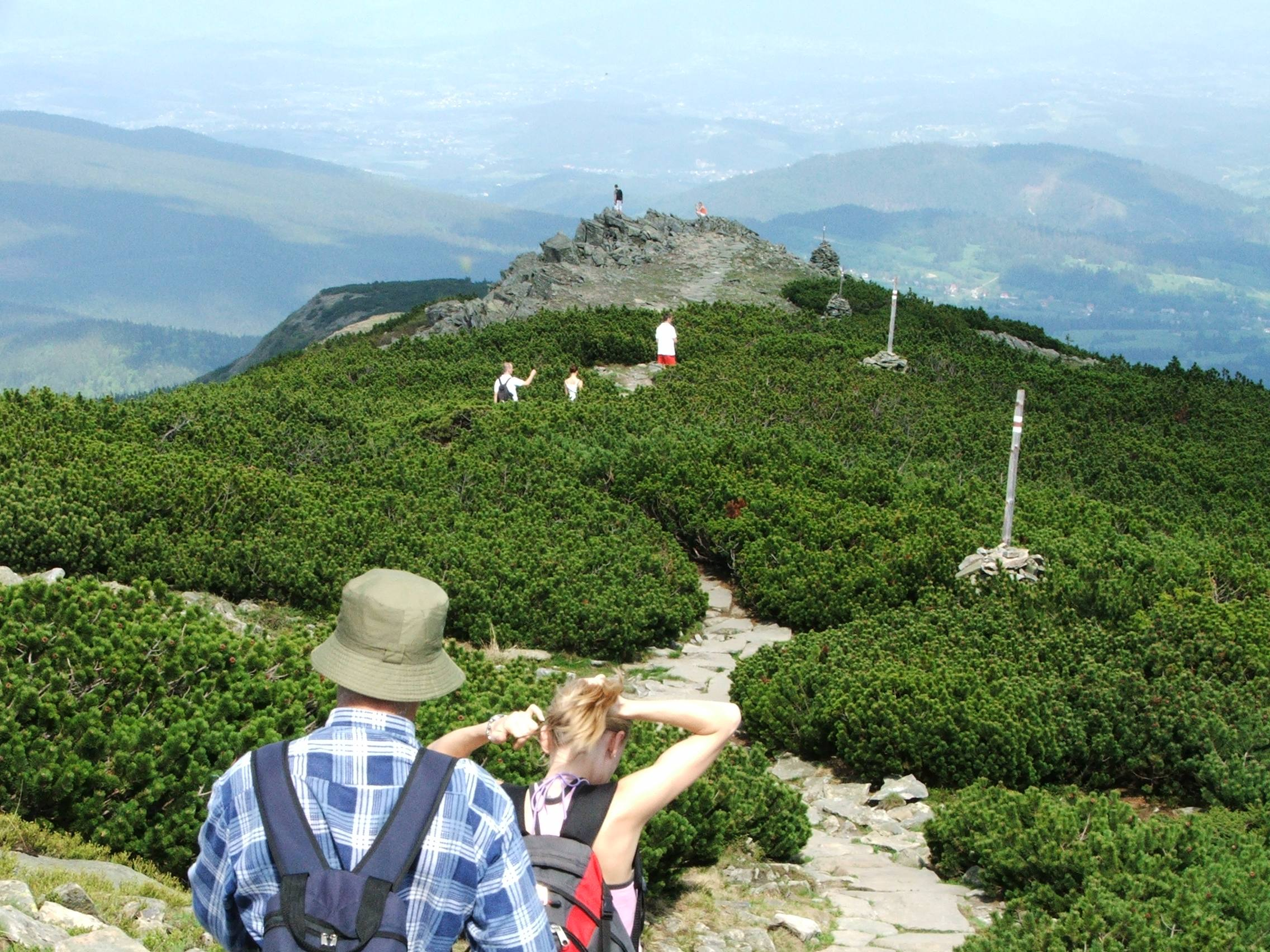
Summit of Babia Góra

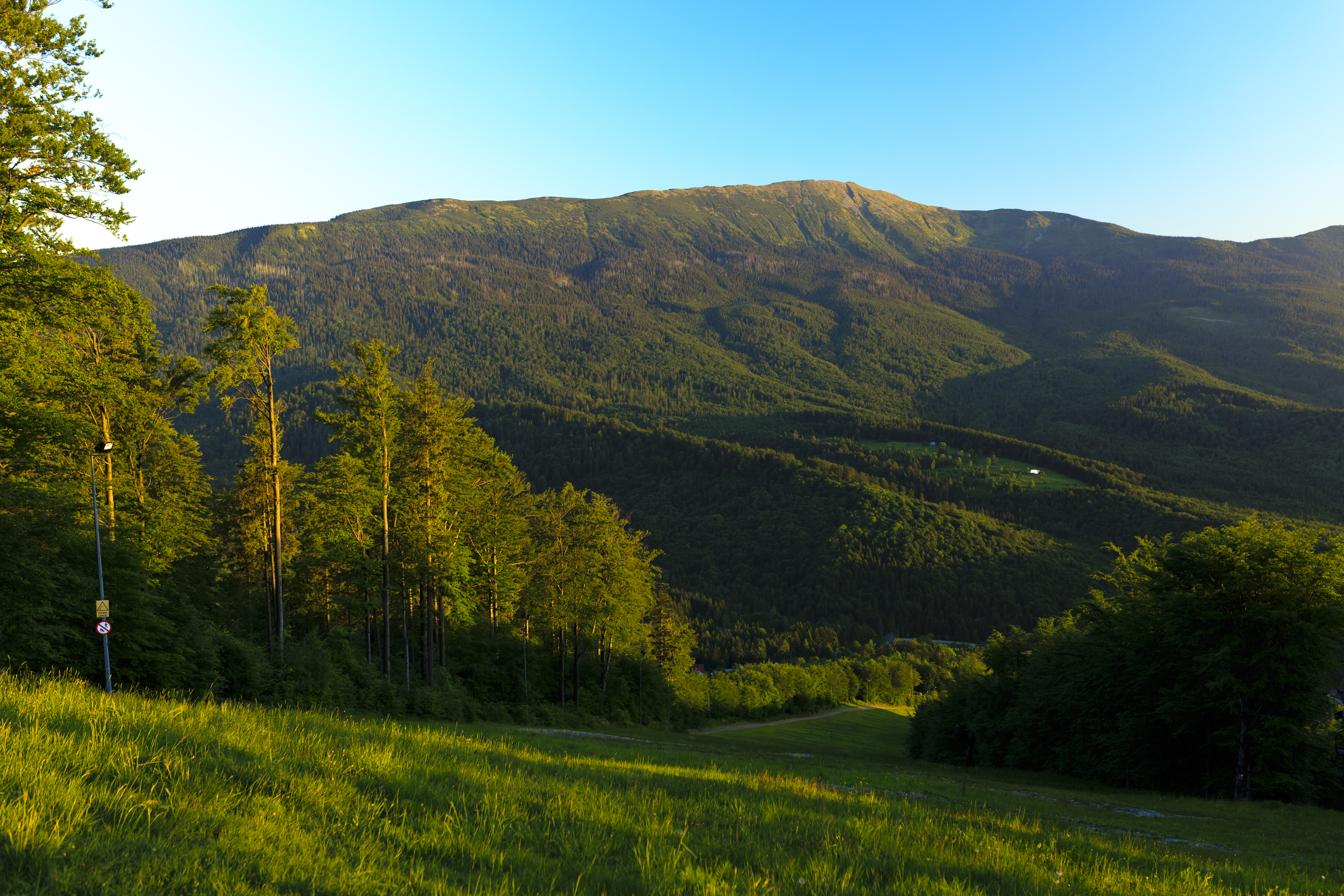
Babia Góra seen from Mosorny Groń

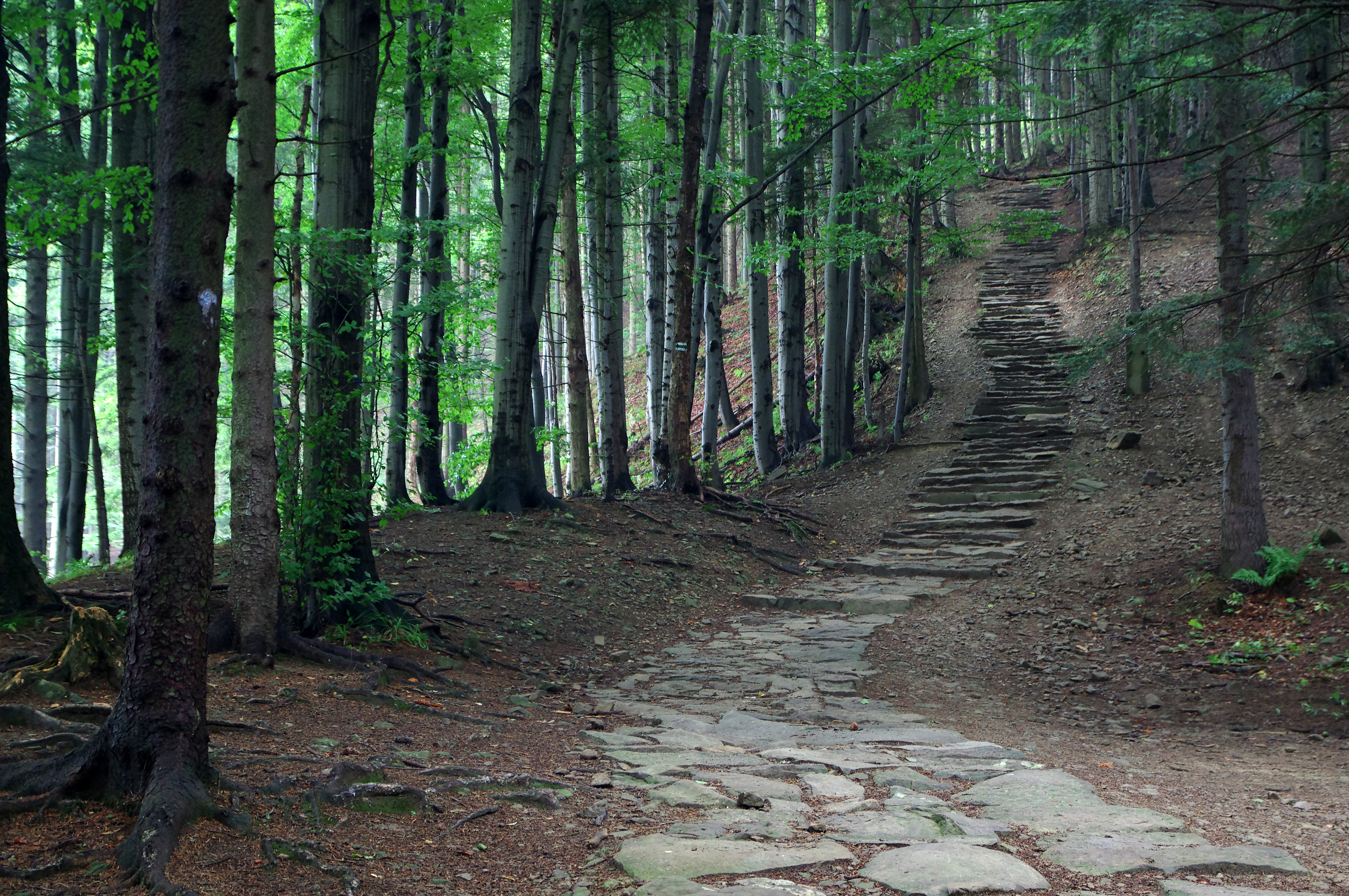
A forest in the Babia Góra National Park

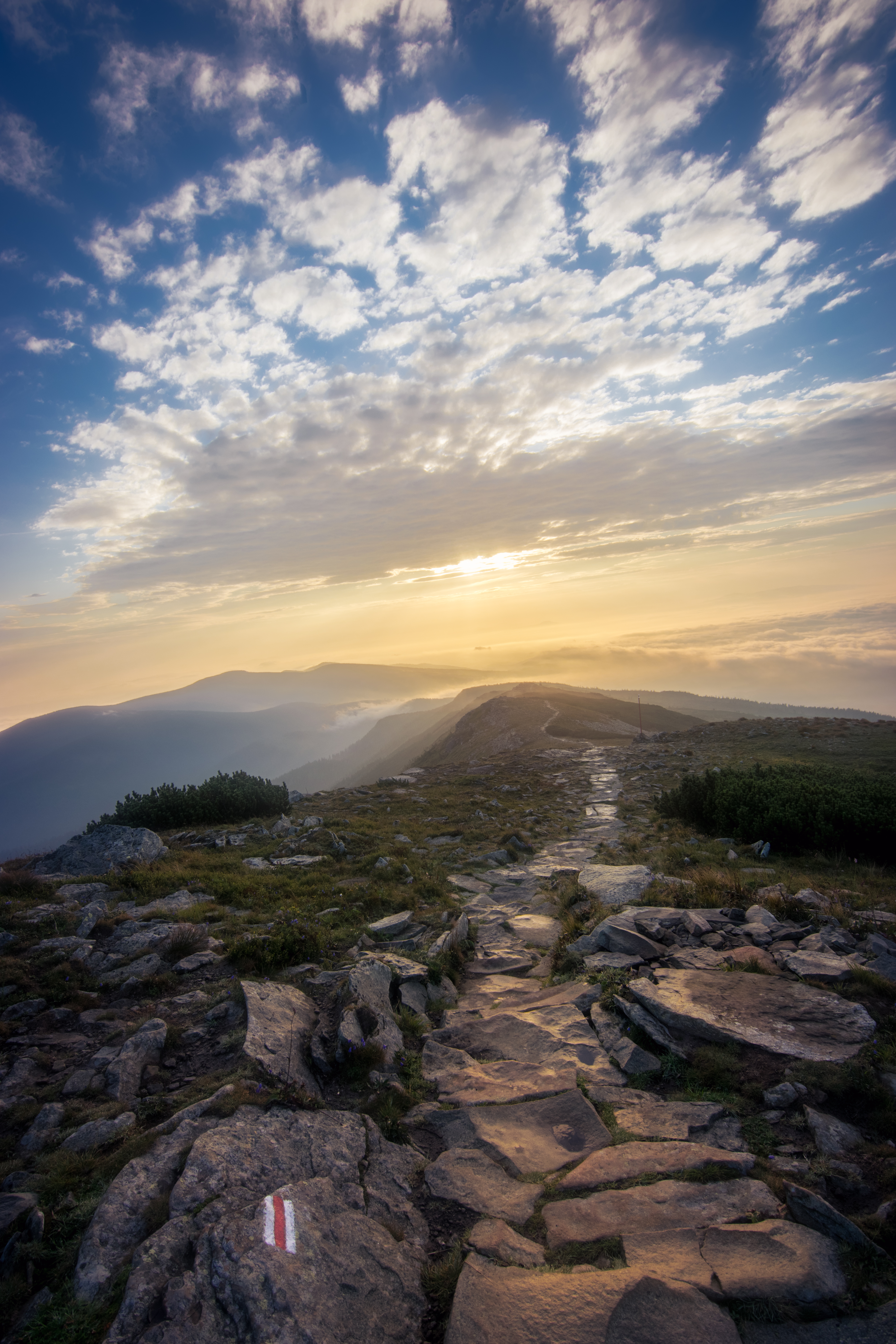
A mountain trail

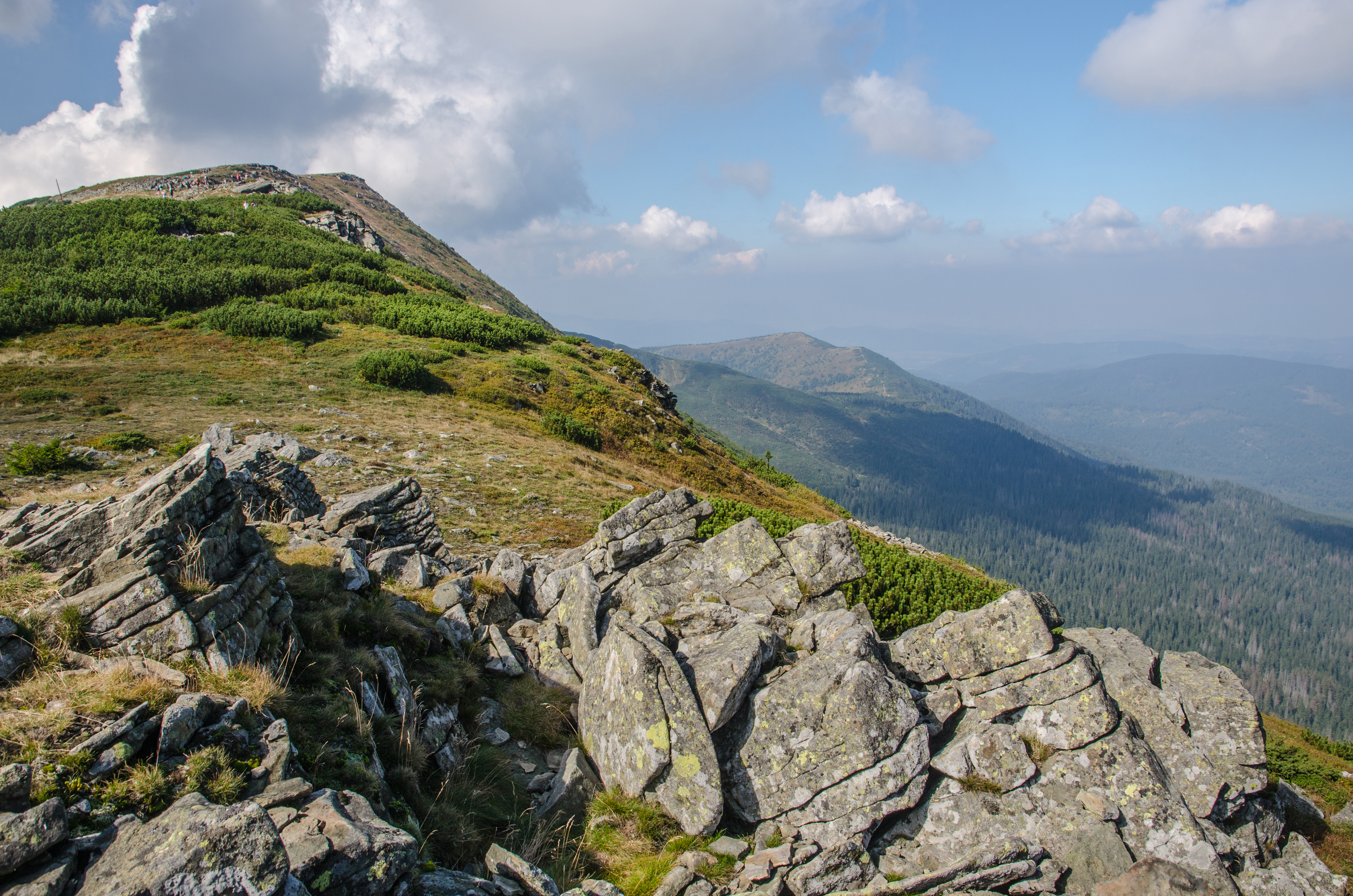
Beskid Żywiecki landscape

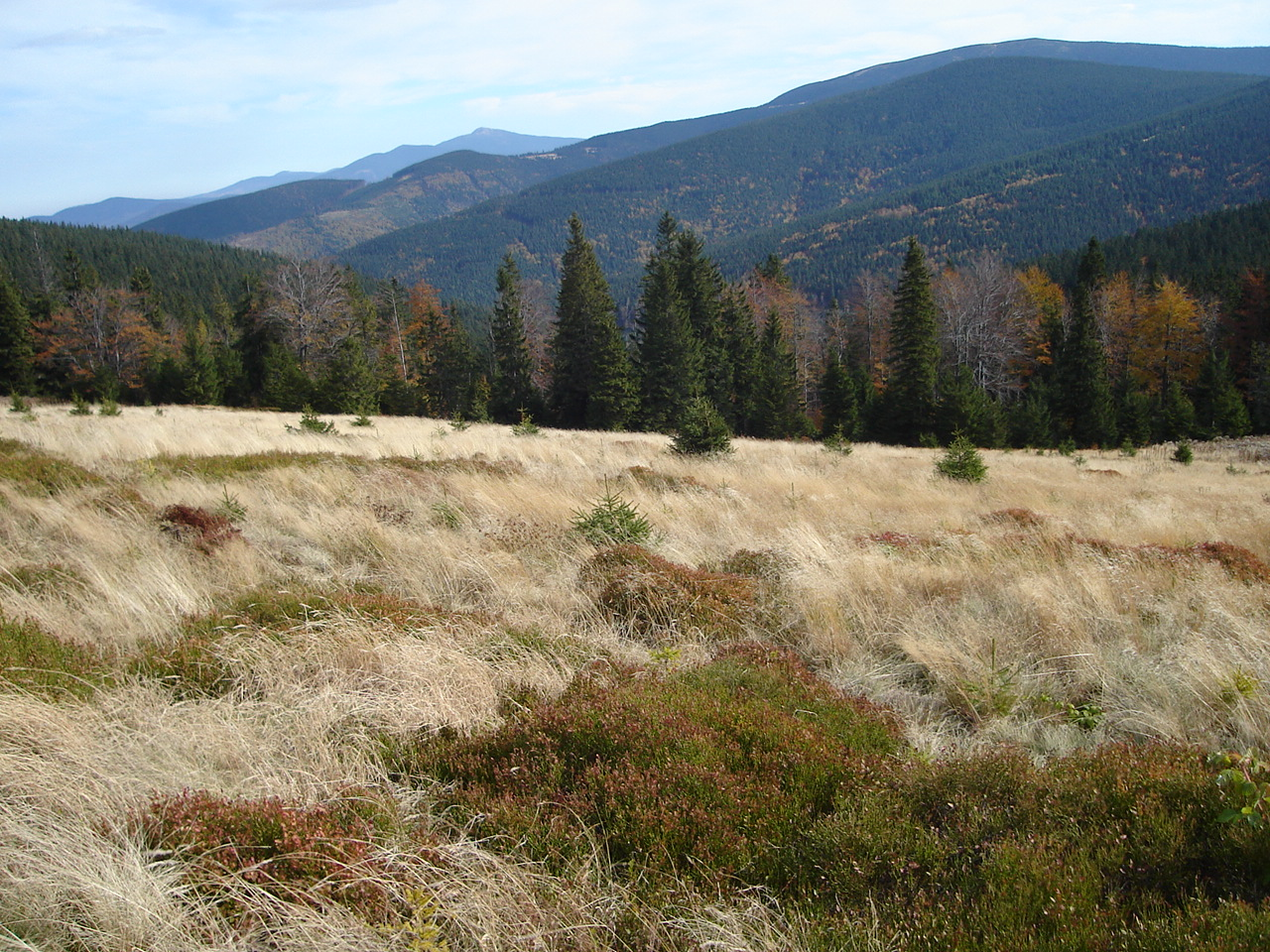
Babia Góra and Pilsko seen from Rysianka

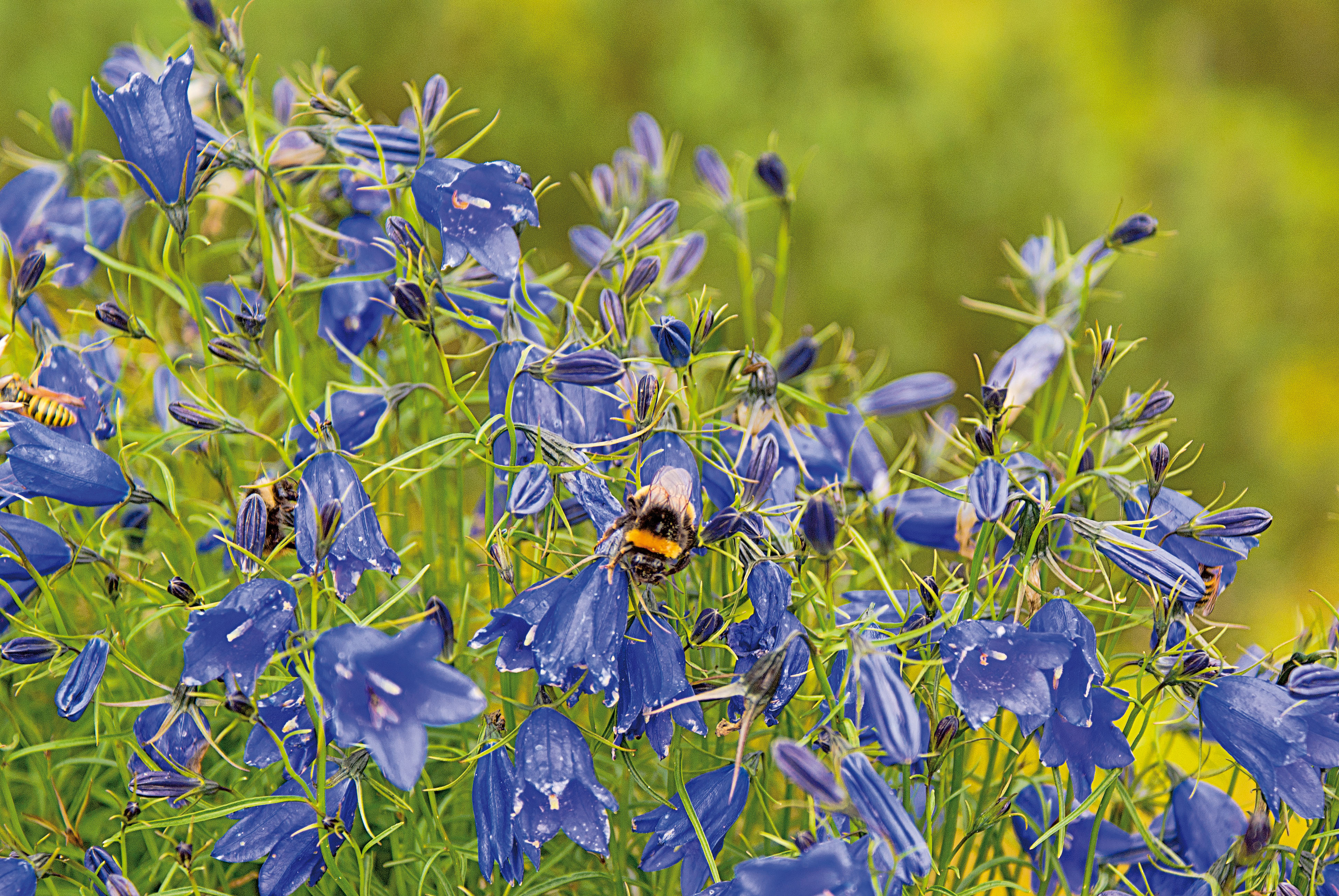
Campanula polymorpha

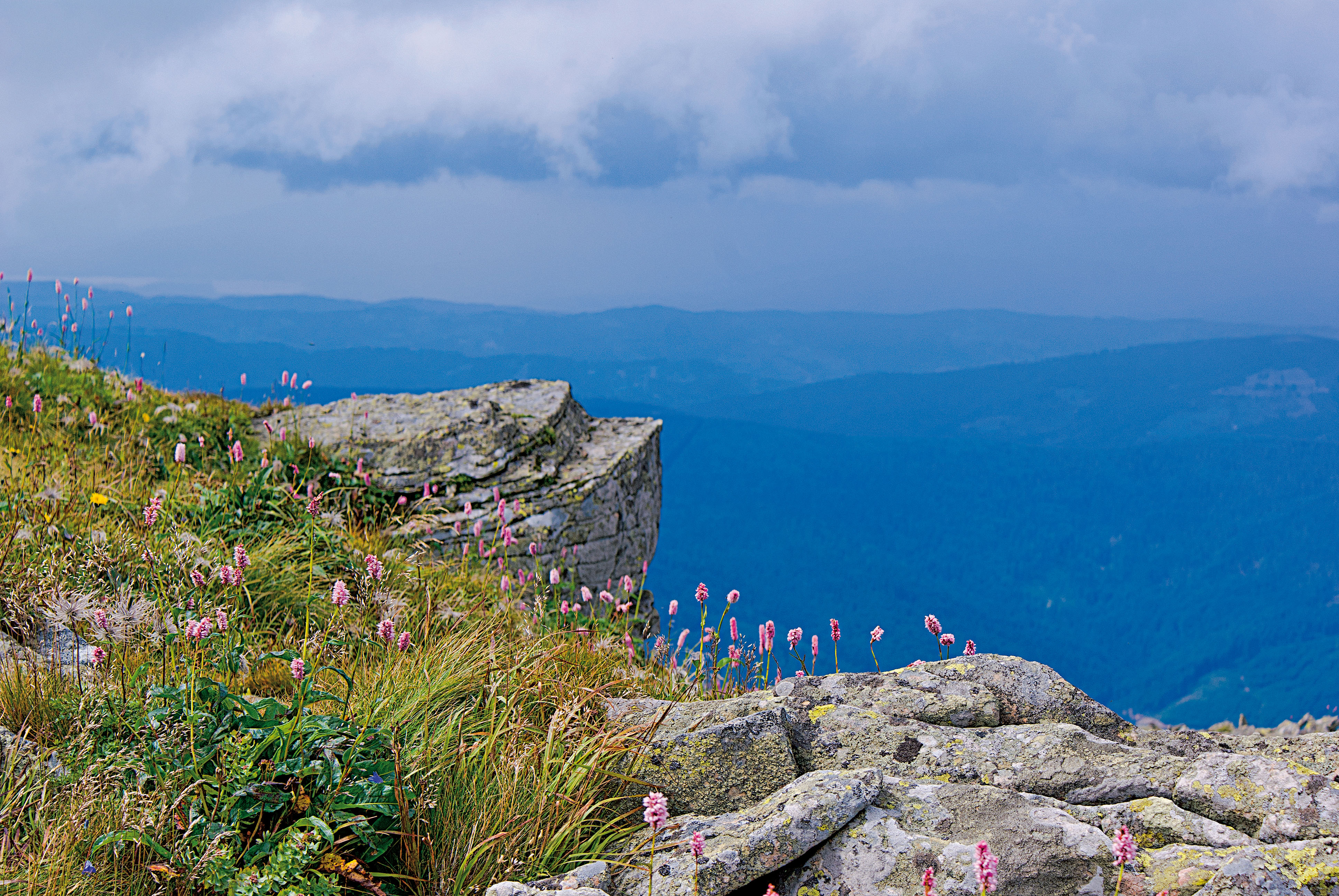
Ostoja Babiogórska Nature Reserve with Alpine flora

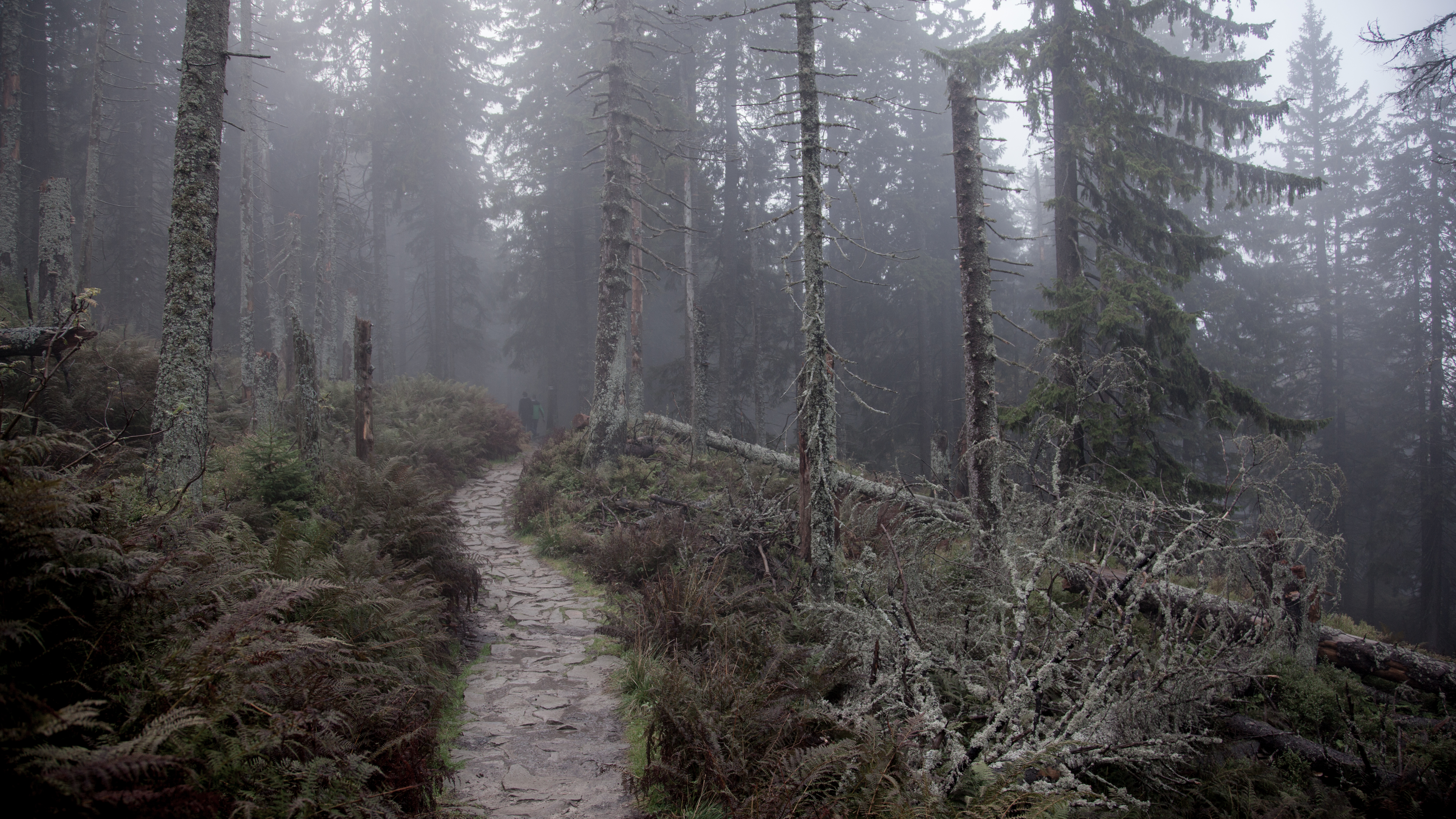
A forest trail

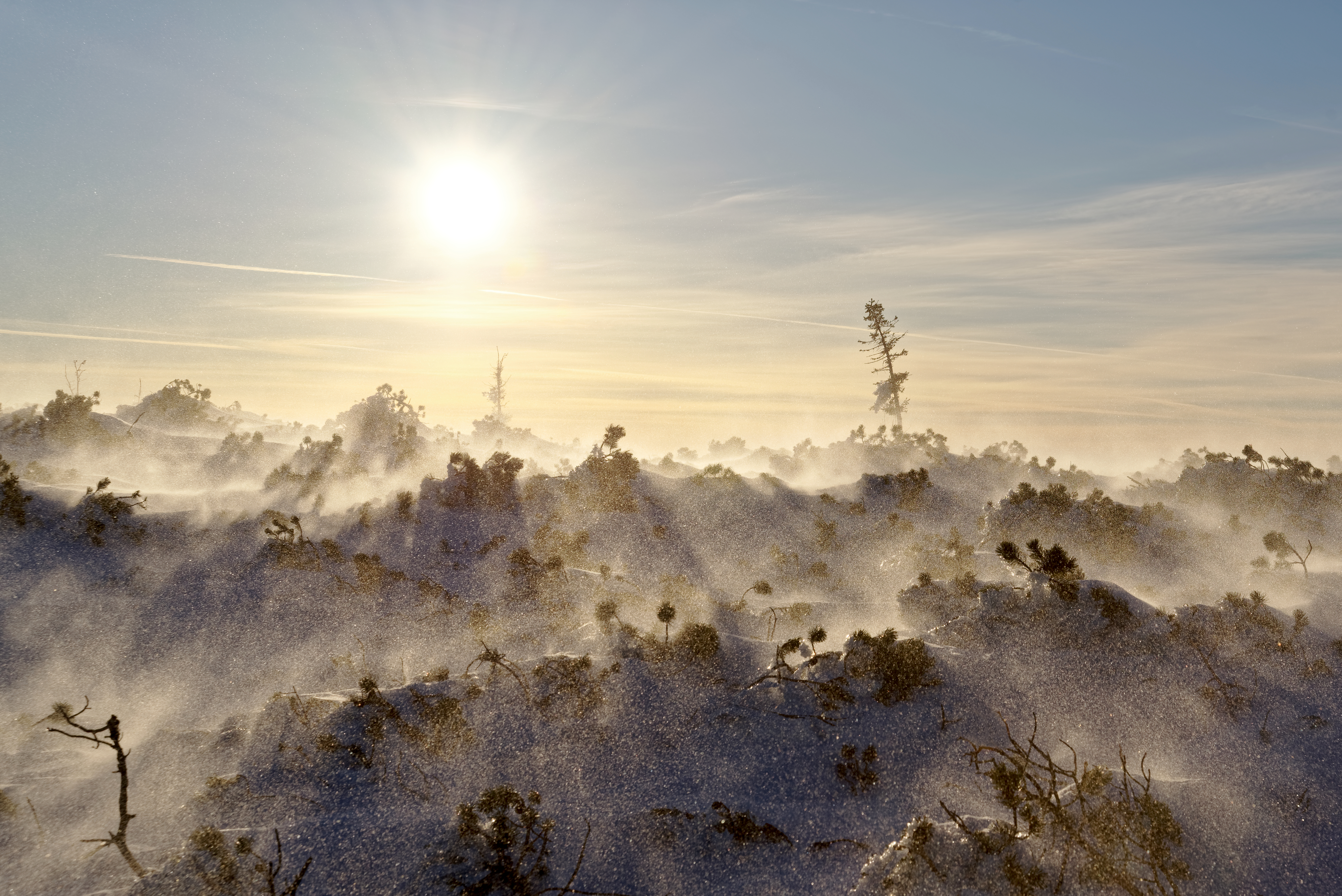
Babia Góra, early morning

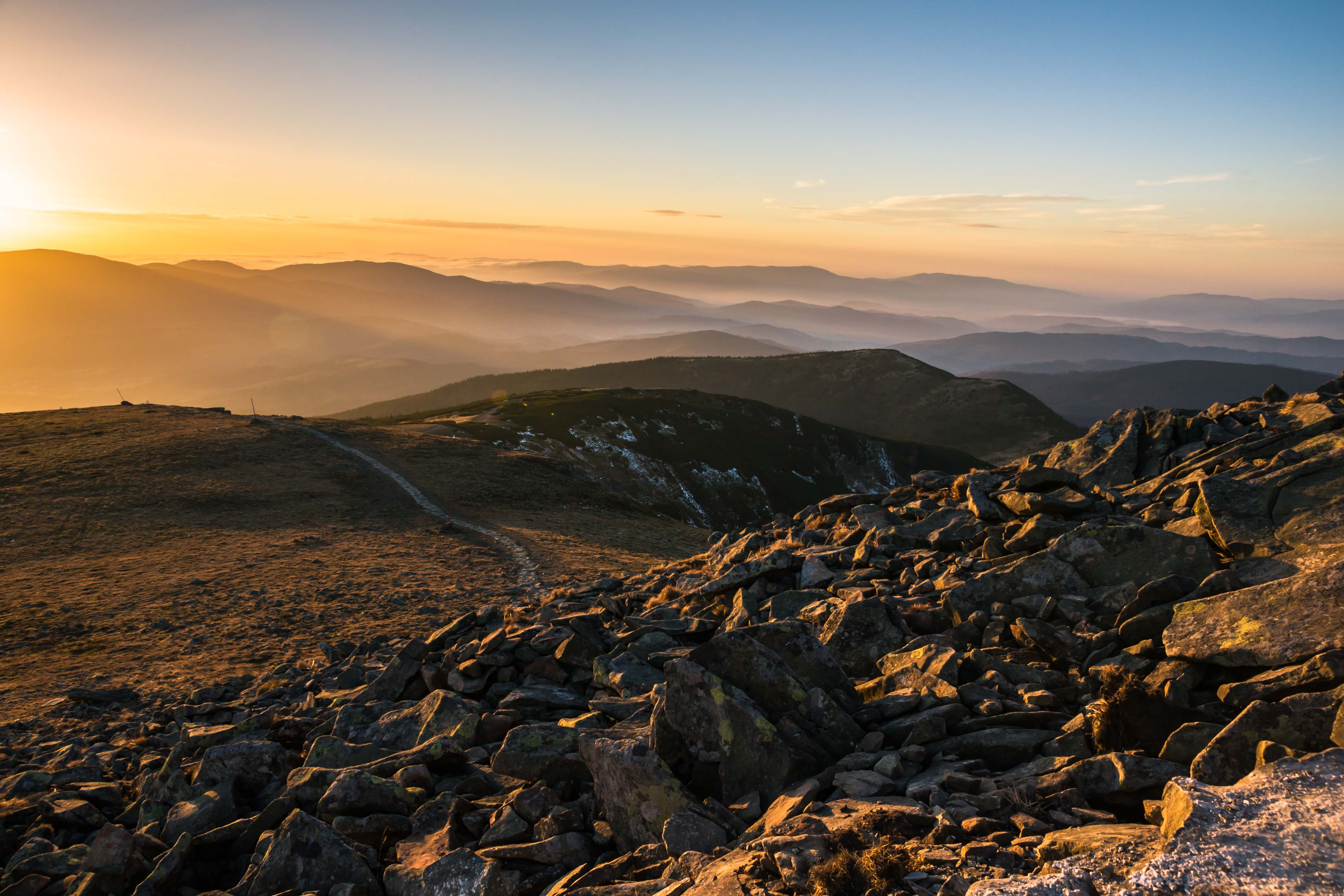
Sunset over Ostoja Babiogorska
