= Henryk Mückenbrunn =

Polish skier

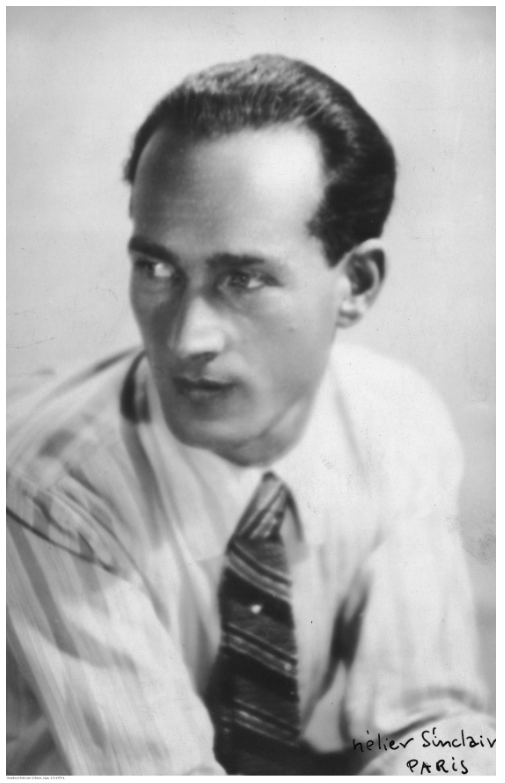

Personal information
- Nationality: Polish
- Born: March 10, 1903 Zakopane, Poland
- Died: 1956 Vallée Blanche

Sport
- Sport: Ski jumping
- Club: SN PTT Zakopane

Henryk Mückenbrunn (born 10 March 1903 in Zakopane, died 1956 in Vallée Blanche) was a Polish skier and a seven-time Polish champion in skiing. He was a two-time Polish record holder in jump length and a former record holder for the ski jumps in Jaworzynka and Zakopane.

He was born into a Jewish family in Zakopane and graduated from the School of Timber Industry there. He was a member of the skiing section of the Polish Tatra Society. In the summer, he climbed mountains, and in the winter, he practiced ski tourism, making many descents in the Tatras. Among his most famous runs were the descent from Skupniów Upłaz and the run from the Karb Pass to the Czarny Staw Gąsienicowy via a steep couloir, as well as the run from the Poľský hrebeň in Vysoké Tatry. He also participated in slalom and obstacle course races.

== Career ==
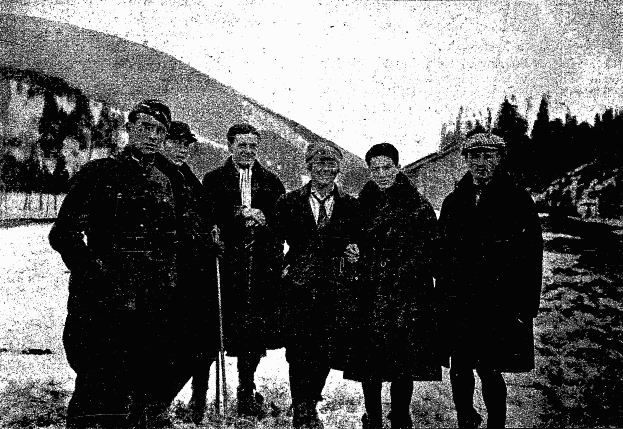
Group of Polish skiers during competitions in Vorokhta in 1922. Henryk Mückenbrunn is second from the right

Mückenbrunn started skiing at a young age, competing with young highlanders from his neighborhood. He made his first official competition appearance in 1918. In 1920, at the I Union Championships of Poland, he won 1st place in the junior ski jumping competition at the Antałówka ski jump, scoring 1.95 points.

=== 1922 ===
In 1922, he won the junior race at the II Union Championships of Poland in Zakopane. During the competition held on January 1, he achieved the longest distance – 24 meters. This was the record for that ski jump at the time. In the same year, at an inter-club competition in Bielsko on Magurka, he took 1st place. He also won the ski jumping event at the Wola Justowska ski jump in Kraków. He participated in the first competition of Polish skiers outside the country, which took place in Weszterovo in Czechoslovakia, where he placed 3rd in the senior Class I race. He was also 2nd in the relay and 3rd in the ski jumping competition. At the Polish Championships in Vorokhta, he finished 2nd in the senior Class I race behind Andrzej Krzeptowski, and in the overall standings, he won the title of Polish Ski Association champion in the combined race. In the senior Class I 18 km race, he placed 5th. At the Bohemian Forest ski jump in Czechoslovakia, he jumped 27 meters and became a Polish record holder. He won a silver medal in the MP in combination.

=== 1923 ===
In 1923, he finished 4th in the ski jumping competition in Jaworzynka, behind Andrzej Krzeptowski, Edward Kaliciński, and Aleksander Rozmus. During the ski jumping competition organized at the end of a ski course led by the amateur trainer Sepp Bildstein from Austria on behalf of the Polish Ski Association, he placed 4th. In the Polish Ski Association qualifying competitions, he secured third place. At the II International Competitions in Zakopane, he finished 2nd in the senior Class I race, but in jumping, he placed 8th and last, likely falling upon landing. At the Tatra Championships in the relay race (staff race) with 10 teams, he took 1st place. At the SN Pogoń competitions in Tukhlia, he won the senior ski jumping event and placed 3rd in the senior race. At the union championships in Slavske, he won the main race, came 3rd in jumping, winning a bronze medal after jumping 20 meters, and finished 4th in the "artificial skiing" race (slalom). He won the Polish Ski Association vice-championship in the combined race, behind Andrzej Krzeptowski. In 1923, he participated again in Weszterovo, where he finished 3rd in the 15 km race and 3rd in jumping. During the ski jumping competition at inter-club competitions in Bielsko on January 28 (the ski jump on the so-called Kamitzer-Platte), he took first place and made the longest jump of the competition – 21 meters. He also became the Polish champion in the 18 km race. With a jump of 38 meters at the Bohemian Forest ski jump, he broke his own Polish record for jump length.

=== 1924 ===
In 1924, a competition was held at the Jaworzynka ski jump involving competitors from the Polish Tatra Society, Czarni Lwów, and LKS Pogoń Lwów, as well as the Kraków club Tatra Ski Society. Mückenbrunn won this competition with the longest jump of 24.5 meters. At the Polish Championships in Krynica, he triumphed in the open ski jumping competition, achieving the longest jump of 24.5 meters. The most important event for the competitors was the combined race and the Norwegian combination, which Mückenbrunn won with a total score of 17.84717 points. At these competitions, he also secured the championship title in the relay race and in the obstacle race. In total, he won four Polish championship titles, for which he received a Polish Ski Association trophy as a reward. Mückenbrunn was part of the national team for the Chamonix 1924 Winter Olympics and was on the list of athletes scheduled to compete in the ski jumping competition. However, he ultimately did not appear at the ski jump, likely due to a broken leg.

=== 1925 ===
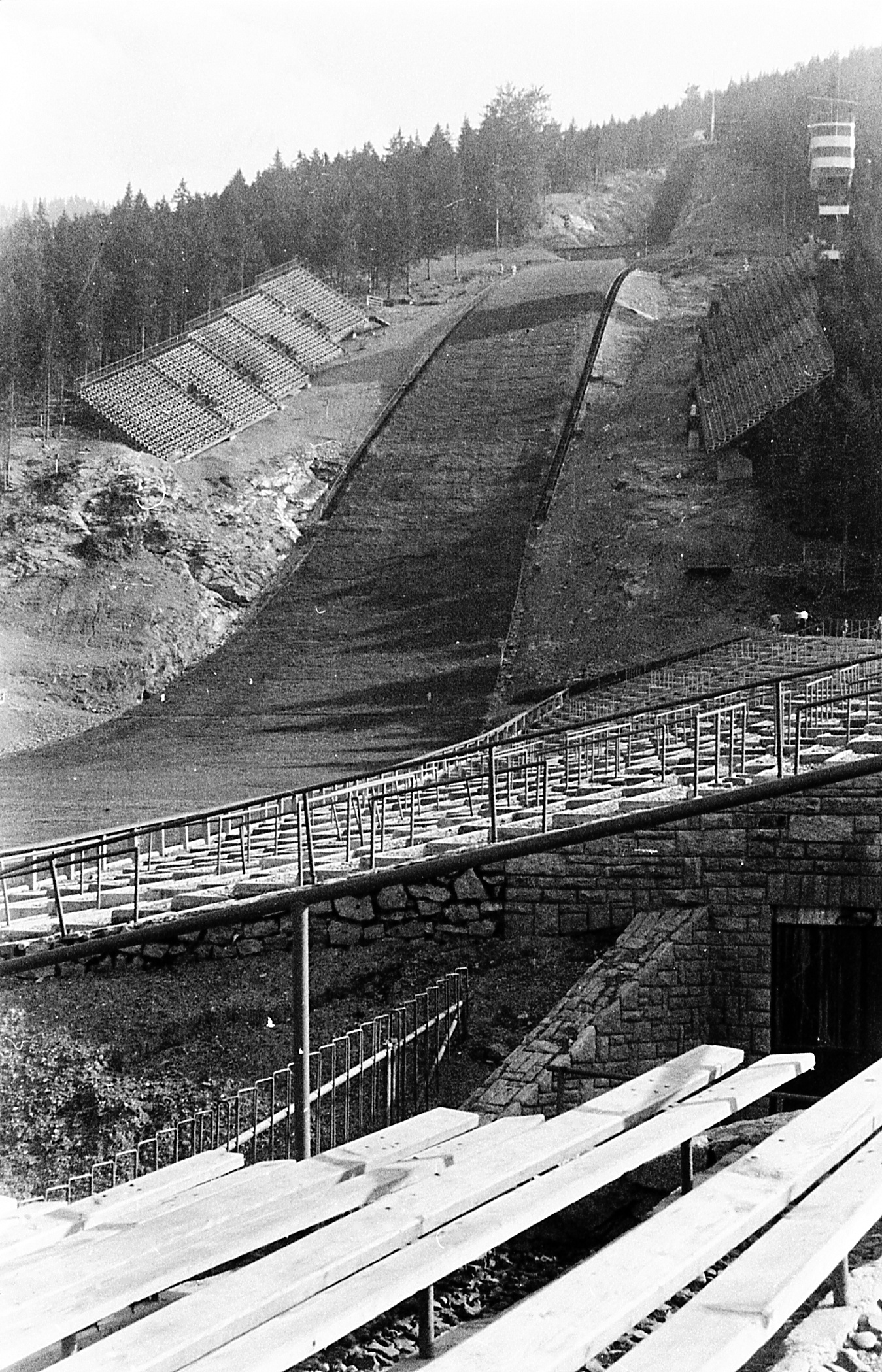
Zakopane ski jump opened in 1925 with a jumping competition in which Mückenbrunn finished second

The opening of the "jumping hill" at Krokiew took place on 22 March 1925, where Mückenbrunn achieved a jump of 32 meters, placing second behind Stanisław Gąsienica Sieczka from Sokół Zakopane, who set the first record for that facility at the time. In the Sokół competitions in Zakopane, he placed 9th in the main race and 8th in the Zakopane ski championship in the 18 km race. He won the Polish Championships in jumping in 1925 in Krynica after jumps of 25 m and 25.5 m, and he also became the national champion in the combined event. He also participated in the FIS Nordic World Ski Championships 1925 in Janské Lázně in Czechoslovakia, later recognized as the first ski world championships, where he placed 44th in the 18 km race and 44th in jumping.

=== 1926 ===
In January, competitions for the title of Master of the Southern Tatras were held in Starý Smokovec, organized by the Carpathian Association. The event concluded with a triumph for Polish skiing: in the 15.2 km race, Mückenbrunn won with a time of 1 hour and 17 minutes, followed by Czech runner Aladar Thern in second place, and his clubmate Aleksander Rozmus in third. In the senior category, Aleksander Schiele won, with August Zamoyski in second place. Janina Loteczkowa from Lviv triumphed in the women's race. The Polish skiers were dubbed "Polish devils" by the audience and journalists. Mückenbrunn also claimed the title of skiing champion of Czechoslovakia during the XXXI International Competition in Nové Město na Moravě, held from 28 to 31 January and organized by the Czech Ski Association. The weather was thawing, and in the Class I race, Mückenbrunn finished fifth. The next day, under foggy conditions with rain and snow, the jumping competition took place, where Mückenbrunn placed 4th. Czechs expected their compatriot Koldovsky, the jumping competition winner, to become the Czechoslovak champion. However, after calculating the scores from the race and jumping, Mückenbrunn emerged as the Czechoslovak champion with a score of 17.583 points, while Koldovsky finished second with 17.479 points, and Franciszek Bujak was third with 17.333 points.

The award ceremony took place in the evening in the presence of the Minister of Health, Dr. Tucny, and the Deputy Minister of Trade, Dr. Cerman, among an audience of a thousand people who applauded the Polish winners with enthusiasm and ovations. When Henryk Mückenbrunn was called, the national anthem was played, and Minister Tucny presented him with a magnificent gold plaque, while Gen. Podhajsky awarded him the cup from the Minister of National Defense, and Mr. J. Pilnacek from the Union presented him with a splendid sculpture of a Spaniel, amid endless cheers and applause.

Mückenbrunn later participated in the famous competitions on Hala Gąsienicowa held in February, where he finished third in the senior category. He also won skiing accolades as part of the 3rd Podhale Rifle Regiment from Bielsko in the international military competitions held in March 1926. He also secured a silver medal in the Polish jumping championships, finishing fifth in the international classification. An invitation to international skiing competitions came from Beskidenverein from Bielsko for the Zakopane clubs. Mückenbrunn was entered by his club for the 16 km race (starting at Klimczok). However, his parents opposed this and took away his skis and boots. Despite this, he went to the competition, where he won using his sister's skis. Later that same year, he was to join the military, but he decided instead to emigrate to France.

=== Later years ===
Mückenbrunn settled in Chamonix, where he became known as an excellent skier and mountaineer. He won awards competing in skiing, skijoring, sledding, and bobsleigh events. He began teaching skiing and spoke three languages, which was rare among instructors in Chamonix at the time, allowing him to attract many international clients. Over time, he built four houses. In 1929, he co-authored a skiing manual titled Le ski par la technique moderne and founded his own ski school, which he ran together with the renowned French skier Émile Allais. Aleksander Rozmus also served as an instructor there. Mückenbrunn became a well-known figure in Chamonix. In the summer, he supplemented his income by working at tennis courts, where he gave tennis lessons. In the 1930s, he worked as a physical education professor at the university in Lyon. He returned to Zakopane only once – for the 1933 Maccabiah Games, an international competition for Jewish sports clubs, held in February 1933. He became the owner of a sports shop and co-owner of a hotel in Chamonix.

During the war, he hid from the occupiers while also helping refugees escape to Switzerland. He was in contact with a member of the French resistance, Józef Szczepaniak, who was from Zakopane and later became an athlete and activist for the Start Zakopane club. In 1944, Mückenbrunn was denounced, arrested by the Gestapo, and imprisoned, but he managed to escape. After the war, when Polish skiers returned to foreign trails and ski jumps and came to Chamonix and Zermatt in Switzerland, Mückenbrunn served as the manager of the Polish team.

== Death ==
In March 1956, rescuers in Chamonix found the bodies of three individuals on the slopes of the Vallée Blanche: the famous guide Paul Demarchi, multimillionaire Fryderyk Ebel (of Polish descent), and Henryk Mückenbrunn. It was determined that the skiers had set out in haste during a snowstorm. Ebel was known as the König der Goldschmugler (King of Gold Smugglers), against whom police had raised serious charges of large-scale gold smuggling. Ebel could not officially cross the French-Swiss border, as he would have been arrested, so he chose a route through the snow-covered mountains. The skiers were heading to the Italian side via the Geant-Courmayeur Pass when they were caught in a snowstorm. All three froze in the crevasses of the glacier. Several articles in the French press discussed the mysterious deaths in the mountains. Mückenbrunn was buried in Chamonix.

For Chamonix and its residents, he remains a well-known figure, perhaps even more so in the Alps than in Zakopane. He invigorated skiing in Chamonix.

== Achievements ==
=== FIS Nordic World Ski Championships ===
- 1925, Czechoslovakia, Janské Lázně – 44th place (18 km race), 44th place (jumping)

=== National and international successes ===
- Polish champion in the 18 km race: 1923
- Polish vice-champion in the 18 km race: 1922
- Polish champion in the classical combined event: 1924, 1925
- Polish champion in jumping: 1924, 1925
- Bronze medalist in Polish championships in jumping: 1923, 1926
- Polish champion in the relay: 1924
- Polish champion in the obstacle race: 1924
- Czechoslovak champion: 1926.
