= Czantoria Wielka =

Mountain on the border of Poland and the Czech Republic

- Velká Čantoryje
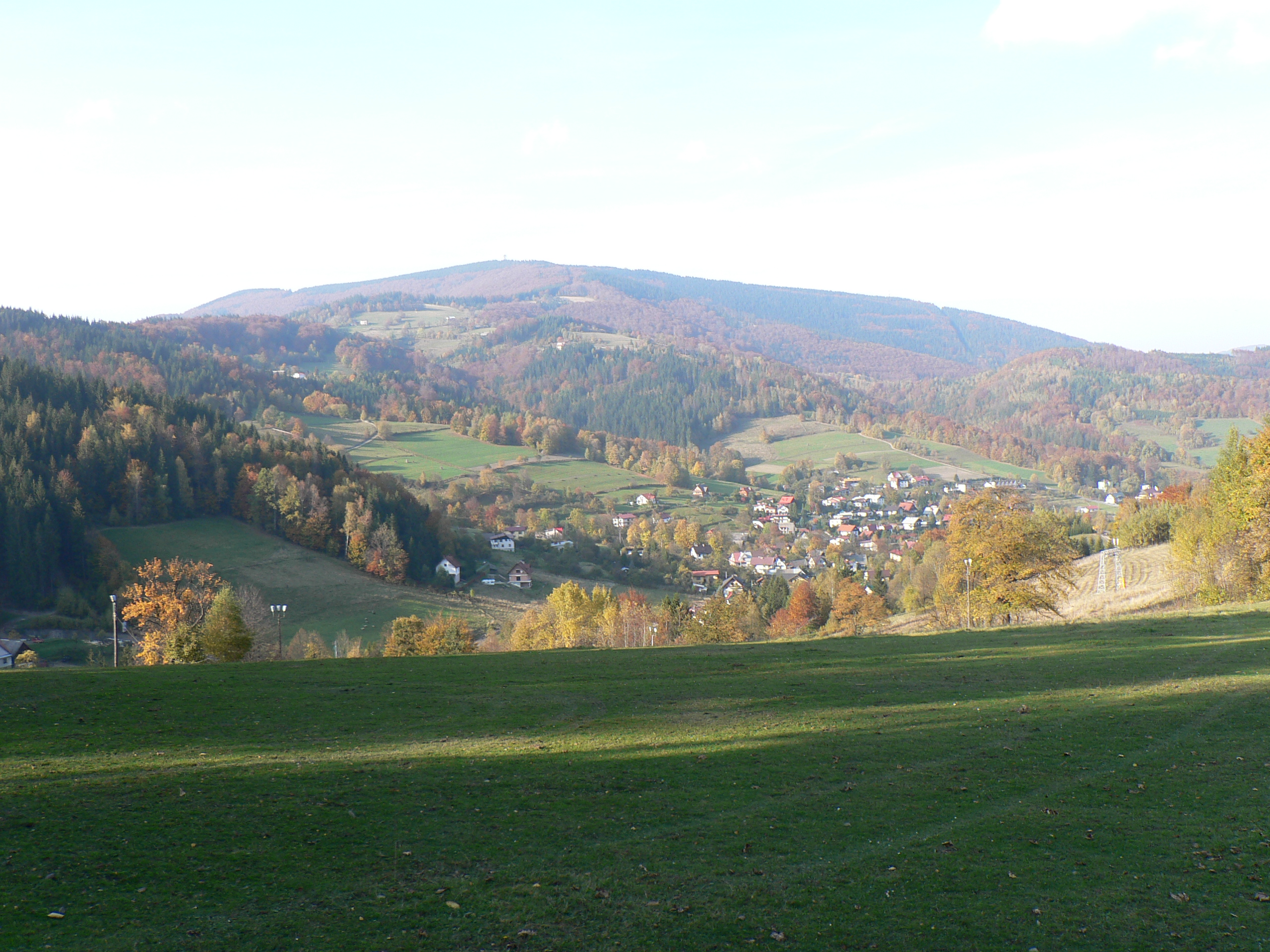
- Mountain viewed from the south

Highest point
- Elevation: 995 m (3,264 ft)
- Prominence: 311 m (1,020 ft)
- Isolation: 12 km (7.5 mi)
- Listing: Mountains of Poland
- Coordinates: 49°40′43.695″N 18°48′16.954″E

Geography
- Location within Silesian Voivodeship Location within Poland
- Location: Poland–Czech Republic border
- Parent range: Silesian Beskids

Climbing
- Easiest route: Hike

Czantoria Wielka or Velká Čantoryje (Polish alternative name: Wielka Czantoria) is a mountain on the border of Poland and the Czech Republic, in the Silesian Beskids mountain range. It reaches a height of 995 metres (3,264 ft). Parts of the mountain on both sides are designated a protected area.

== Geography ==
The peak of Czantoria Wielka is located on the tripoint of municipal territories of Ustroń and Wisła (Silesian Voivodeship, Poland) and Nýdek (Moravian-Silesian Region, Czech Republic). The mountain lies in the historical region of Cieszyn Silesia.

It is distinct for its steep slopes in the east and the west. Mostly coniferous trees grow on its slopes. It is the largest peak of the Czech part of the Silesian Beskids. There is a 29 m-high lookout tower on the mountain and mountain hut on the Czech side of the mountain.

== History ==
The mountain hut was constructed in 1904 by the German tourist association Beskidenverein, and was named Erzherzogin Isabella Schutzhaus in honor of Archduchess Isabella of Austria. In 1920 the new border between the states of Poland and Czechoslovakia was established running across the mountain (thus creating Trans-Olza region). After World War II and expropriation of German property, the hut was nationalized by the Czechoslovak government. A smaller mountain hut was built on the Polish side in 1962.

== Tourism ==
In 1965–1967 a chairlift was constructed on the Polish side, it has been renovated several times since. Reaching the mountain via chairlift takes roughly 6 minutes. The mountain can be hiked from both sides of the border, though the Polish side offers easier access to the summit from Ustroń. The Knight's hiking trail from the Czech side runs through the municipality of Nýdek.

== Gallery ==
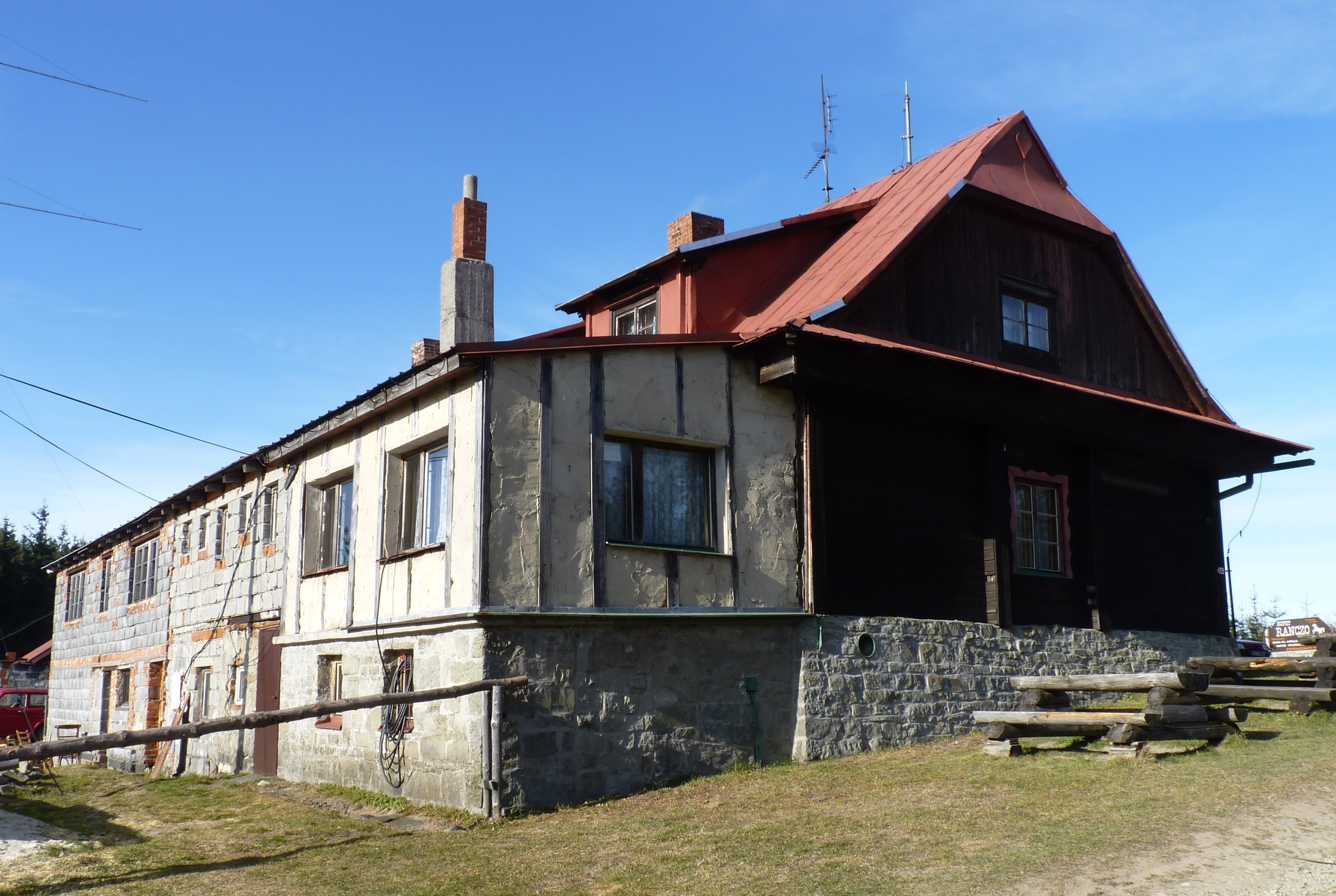
Mountain hut

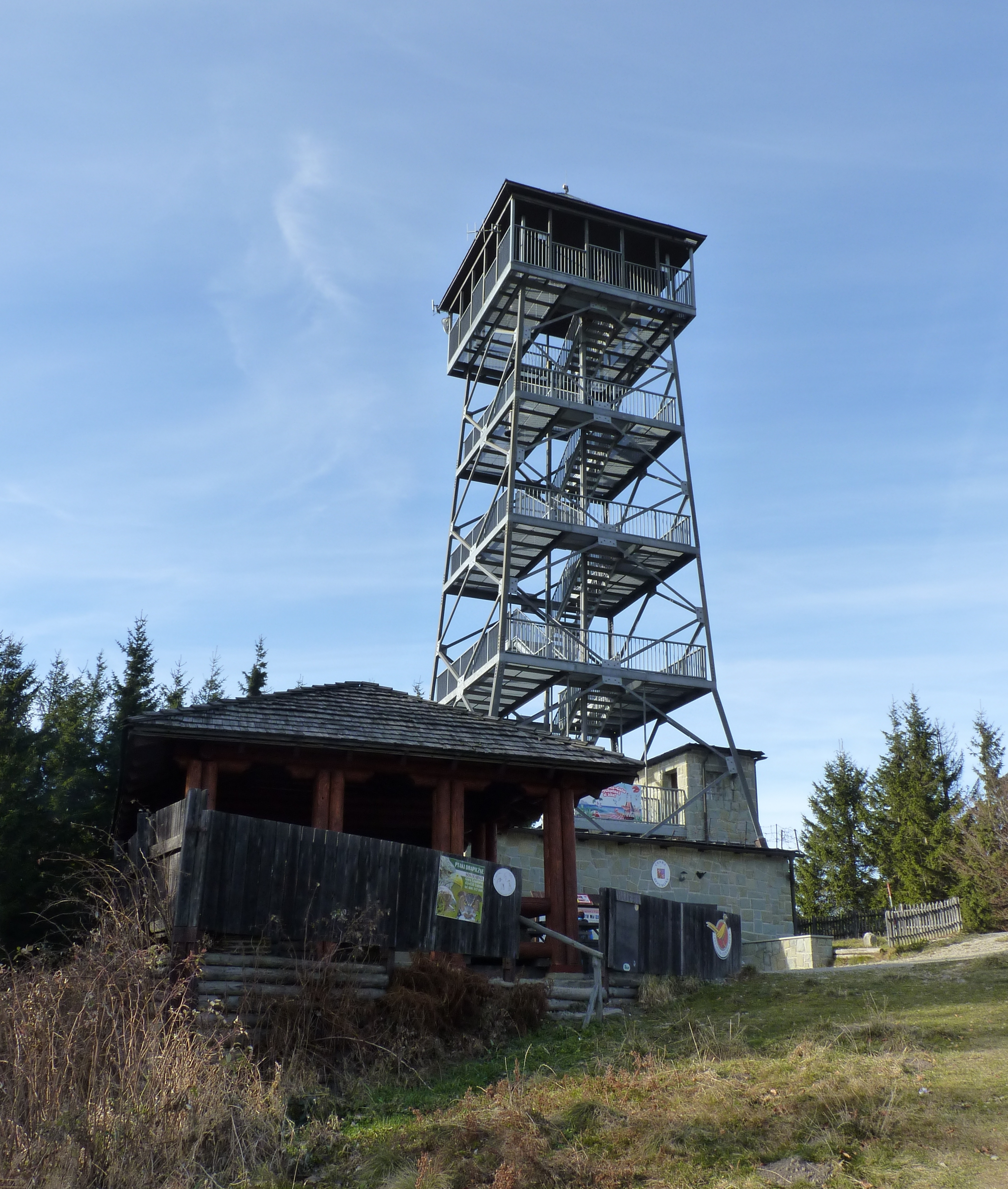
Observation tower

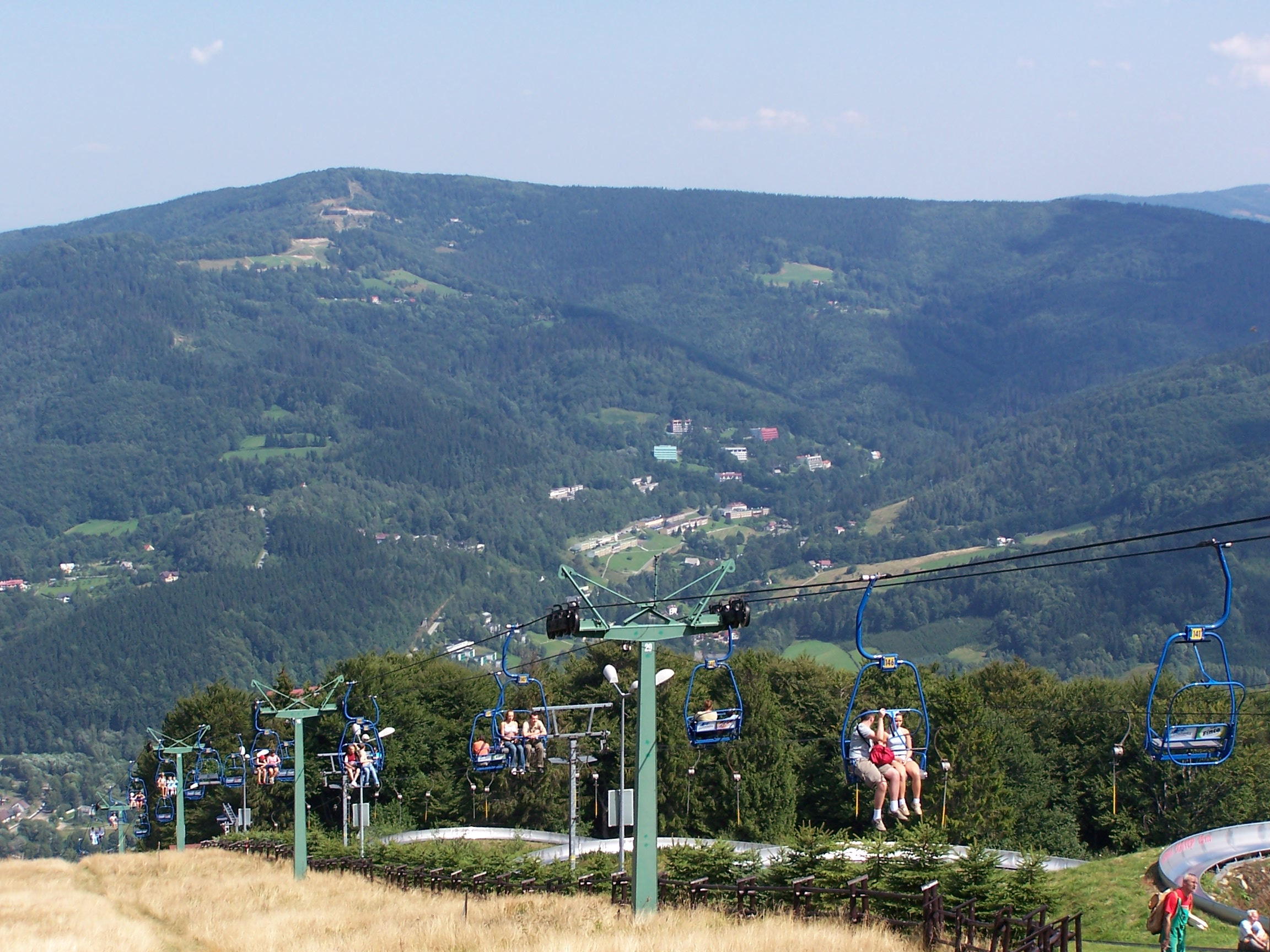
Czantoria chairlift

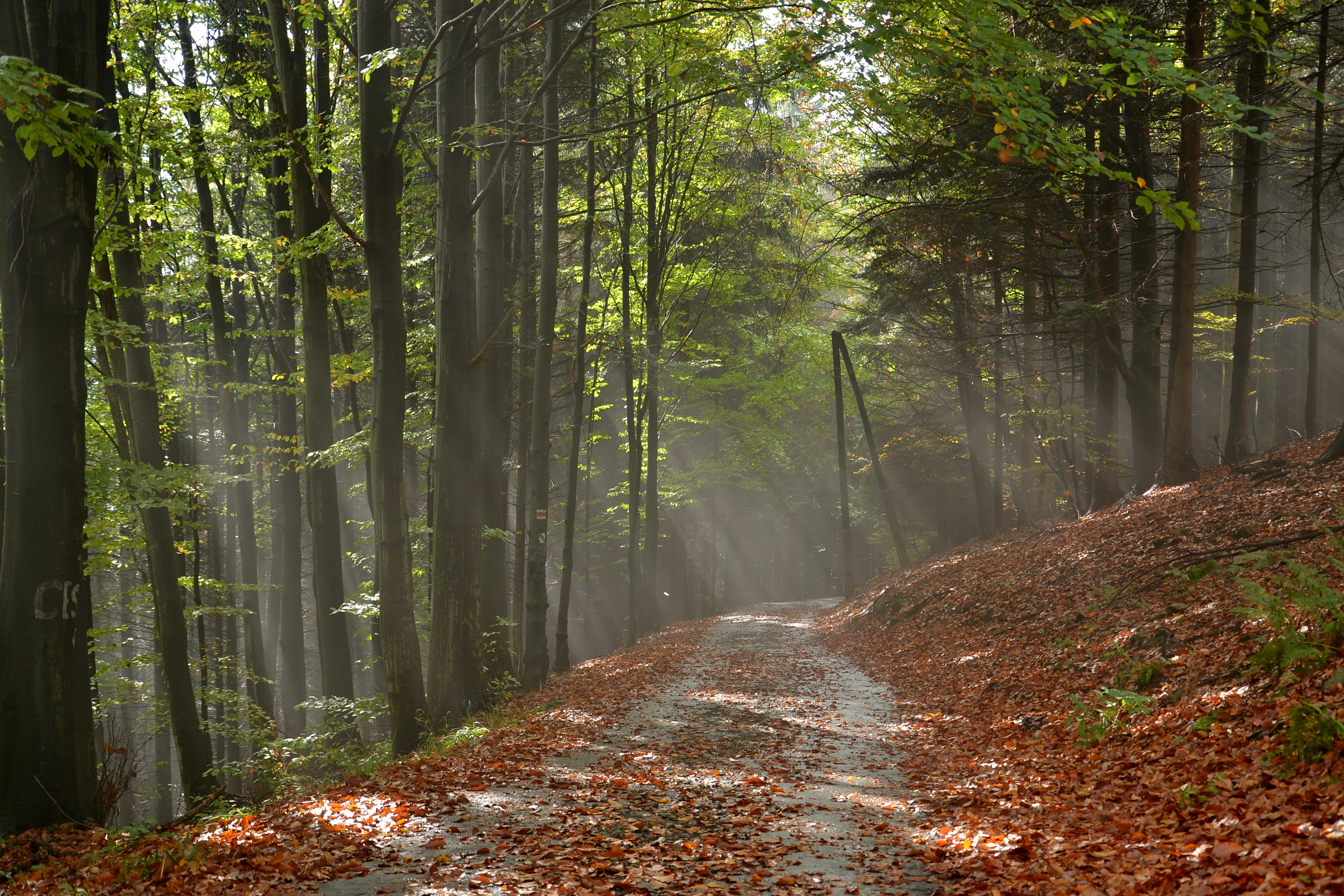
Knights' hiking trail

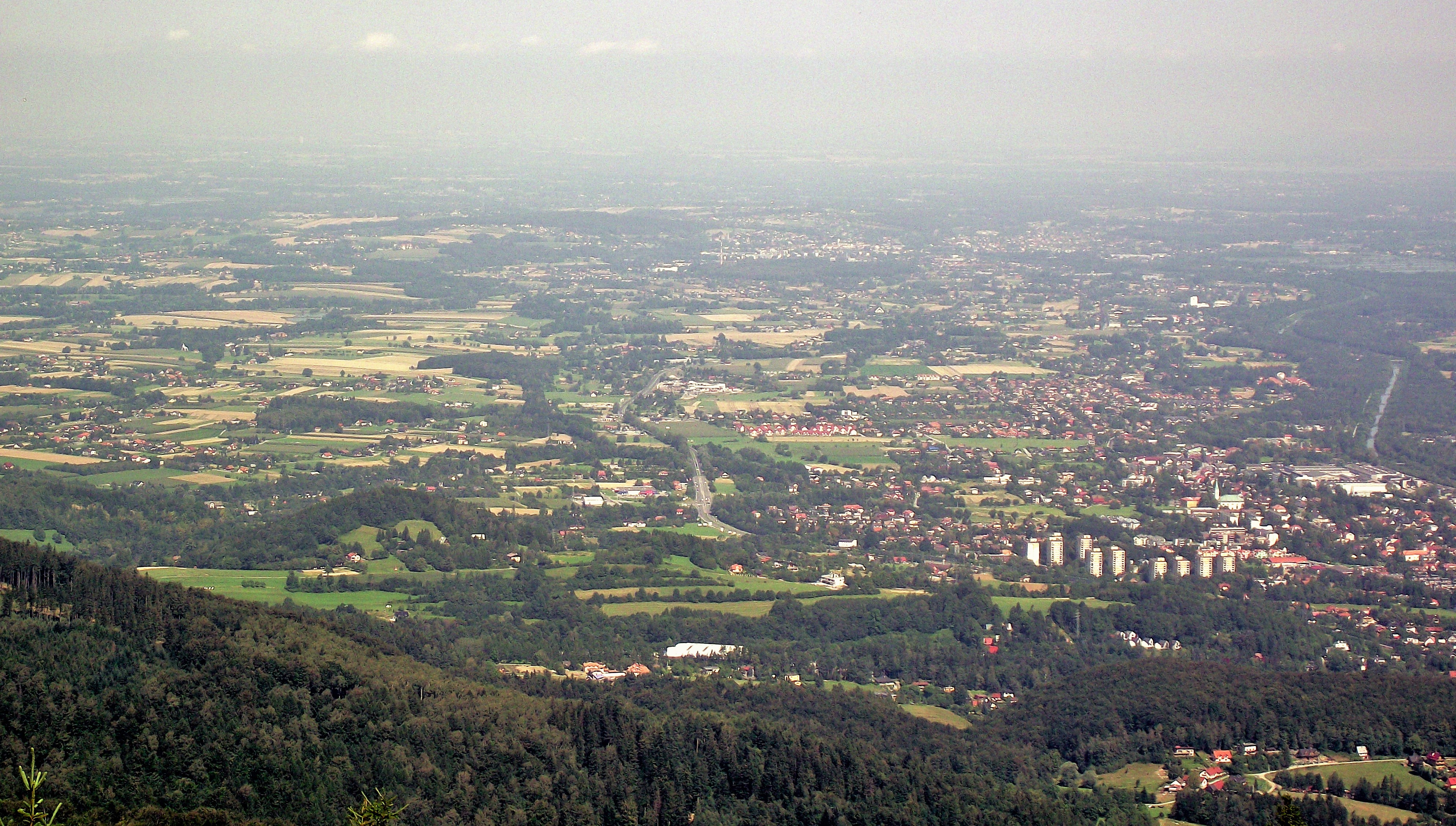
A big part of Cieszyn Silesia seen from the mountain
