= Beskidenverein =

Former German tourist association

Beskidenverein, Beskiden-Verein, Beskiden Verein was a German tourist association founded in 1893. It was the first organization operating in the Beskids region, which at that time belonged to Austria-Hungary and currently belongs to Poland; the Polish Tatra Association (Note: Initially under the name Galician Tatra Association, then Tatra Association.) was founded in 1873 but initially limited its activities to the Tatra Mountains and the Beskid ranges located in present-day Ukraine, while the Czech Pohorská jednota "Radhošť" was active in the Beskids currently belonging to the Czech Republic.

Beskidenverein conducted extensive activities to promote mass tourism and was a pioneer of Beskid tourism in many fields. It operated officially until 1945.

== Beginnings and activities until 1918 ==
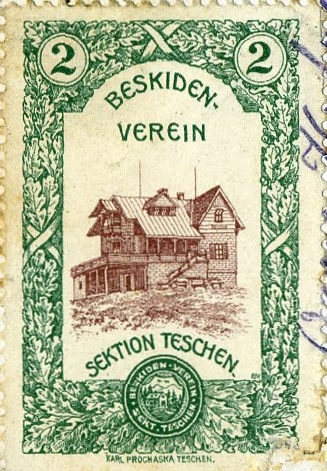
Stamp affixed to postcards with images of Beskidenverein huts. The sale of such postcards was one way of subsidizing the association.

The second half of the 19th century marked the creation of the first tourist and mountain organizations across Europe. In Austrian Silesia, the first branches of the German Moravian-Silesian Sudeten Mountain Association (German: Mährisch-Schlesischer Sudetengebirgsverein, MSSGV) were established – a section in Opava (1882), followed by one in Vitkovice (now a district of Ostrava – 1884). In 1884, the Czech Pohorská jednota "Radhošť" was founded in Frenštát pod Radhoštěm. Already then, there were voices calling for the creation of a German tourist organization operating solely in the Beskids – active proponents of this were Karl Richter, a politician and lawyer, and teacher Johann Hadaszczok, both from Moravian Ostrava. Their dreams came true on 28 February 1893 – Beskidenverein was founded in Frýdek-Místek. It was modeled after the Austrian (and later all-German) organization Austrian Alpine Club. The headquarters were initially planned for Frýdek-Místek but were eventually established in Moravian Ostrava and later moved to Cieszyn. Karl Richter became the first chairman. At the turn of the century, the most active members were high school professors from Moravian Ostrava (Josef Matzura), Cieszyn (Alois Steiner), and Bielsko (Karl Kolbenheyer).

Beskidenverein was organized into independent sections, covering the entire area of interest. Its members were Germans living in large numbers in the Austrian Silesia of the time and in northern Moravia. The goal was to develop the areas from Lysá hora in the west to Babia Góra in the east of the Beskids for tourist purposes: to facilitate the practical realization of goals (...) through trail marking and road improvement, through the construction and operation of mountain support points – facilitating movement in the Beskids and increasing the desire for hiking (quote from Beskidenverein's statute from 1893).

The main sources of funding (besides membership fees) included financial support from German landowners, the German bourgeoisie, and industrialists. The association was also materially and politically supported by the Cieszyn princes from the Habsburg line – Archduke Albrecht, and after his death in 1895, Archduke Friedrich.

Among the tourists visiting the Silesian Beskids at the turn of the 19th and 20th centuries, numbering tens of thousands annually, about 90% were Germans, with the remaining mainly being Czechs. The number of Poles hiking the mountain trails was estimated to be only 1%. Beskidenverein was an organization of Germans, and most of its activities were conducted through the prism of the interests of this national group. For this reason, conflicts arose with similar Czech and Polish organizations, which intensified during the interwar period, under changed political and economic conditions.

=== Organizational division before World War I ===
In 1909, the association already had 13 sections – the strongest in Bielsko (and Biała – Sektion Bielitz-Biala, also Beskiden Bielitz-Biala Verein), Cieszyn, and Vítkovice. The territorial division looked as follows: Austrian Silesia – Bielsko, Cieszyn, Frýdek-Místek, Bílovec (since 1901), Bohumín (since 1909); Moravia – Moravian Ostrava, Místek, Vítkovice, Frýdlant nad Ostravicí, Nový Jičín; German Upper Silesia: Racibórz (since 1897), Katowice (since 1898), Bytom (since 1906), and Mysłowice (since 1907). World War I did not slow down the development of Beskidenverein – in 1915, the number of sections increased to 18; additional sections came from Germany – Pszczyna, Rybnik, Chorzów, and even a distant section from Wrocław.

The most active was the Bielsko section – already in the year of its establishment, it had 432 members (in 1909 – 1210) and marked trails to Szyndzielnia, Klimczok, and Błatnia. At the turn of the century, it was led by Paul Niepen and Robert Meinhardt.

The general meetings of Beskidenverein were held each time in the headquarters of a different section, which participated in the deliberations through their delegates.

=== Number of Beskidenverein members from 1893 to 1909 ===
- 1893 – 1534
- 1895 – 1814
- 1900 – 2835
- 1905 – 3238
- 1909 – 4618

In 1915, the number of association members exceeded 5,000. The majority of them (about 40%) came from the German Empire, slightly fewer from Austrian Silesia, and about 25% from Moravia.

=== Trail blazing activities in the Beskids ===
The association marked and established hiking trails. In the year of Beskidenverein's establishment, it marked the first trails in the Beskids – around Klimczok, Magura, and Błatnia. However, it is not known in what form and which routes were marked; the first detailed description of trails concerns the areas around Babia Góra. In August 1894, Wilhelm Schlesinger (a member of the Bielsko Beskidenverein), Lajos Klein (a postmaster from Oravská Polhora), and two other activists marked the Slaná Voda trail (from the Słona woda spa in Oravská Polhora) – Polana Hucisko–Gajówka Hviezdoslava–Głodna Woda–Diablak. The color of the trail was red. On 11 June 1895, after obtaining permission from the Directorate of Żywiec Estates (the area belonged to Archduke Charles Stephen of Austria), Schlesinger, along with a team, marked the first precisely described trail in the Polish Beskids on the route Zawoja–Gruba Jodła–Markowe Szczawiny–Dejakowe Szczawiny–Stary Groń–Widły. The first Polish trail appeared in this area (and also in the entire Western Beskids) only in 1906. The signposts displayed only in the German language; they directed, among others, to Brana (Cyl), Branasattel (Brona pass), and Teufelspitze (Diablak).

By 1908, Beskidenverein had already established 300 km of trails, and the marking system – a colored strip between two white ones (established in 1897 and formally approved in 1899) – was later adopted in many countries, and it was also used by the Polish Tatra Association.

=== Publishing activities ===
Beskidenverein was a pioneer in many fields in the Beskids, and its publishing activity was extremely important. It published numerous maps, the first mountain guides, jubilee books, reports, and periodicals (including Mitteilungen des Beskidenvereines, from 1904 to 1915, first in Bielsko, then in Cieszyn; the bulletin was published 6 times a year, initially with a circulation of 4,000 copies, later increased to 5,200 copies).

The strongest Bielsko section began publishing its own yearbooks (Jahresbericht der Sektion Bielitz-Biala des Beskiden-Vereines) in the year of the organization's and section's founding – 1893. Initially, they were modest, several-page brochures in a reporting form. From 1900 onwards, the name was changed to Jahresbericht der Sektion Bielitz-Biala des Beskiden-Vereines and the volume was increased. Feuilletons and more ambitious texts began to appear. The yearbook was published until 1911, then there was a long break until the interwar period. In 1927, a report was issued for the years 1912–1925, as well as in 1928 for the years 1926–1927. Subsequent issues were irregularly published in the form of a short brochure. The last one was published in 1943 as a report for the previous year. At that time, the section also prepared a jubilee publication on the occasion of the 50th anniversary of its activity – as it turned out, this was the last aspect of Beskidenverein's publishing activity.

The Bielsko section also had a significant role in preparing tourist maps and guides. The most important publications include:

- Führer durch die Beskiden im Gebiete der Section Bielitz-Biala des Beskiden-Vereines – 1891, by Karl Kolbenheyer,
- Illustrirter Führer durch die Beskiden und die agrenzenden Landschaften – 1891, by Josef Matzura,
- Führer durch Bielitz-Biala und Umgebung – 1912,
- Spezialkarte des schles.-gal. Beskiden – by Wilhelm Schlesinger.

Among other sections, the Frýdek-Místek section was also active in publishing. The most important publication was the guide Führer durch die Beskiden by Johann Hadaszczok, reissued several times.

The Bielsko section established a library where it collected a collection of books related to the mountains. In 1903, it contained 55 volumes.

=== Beskidenverein's mountain huts ===
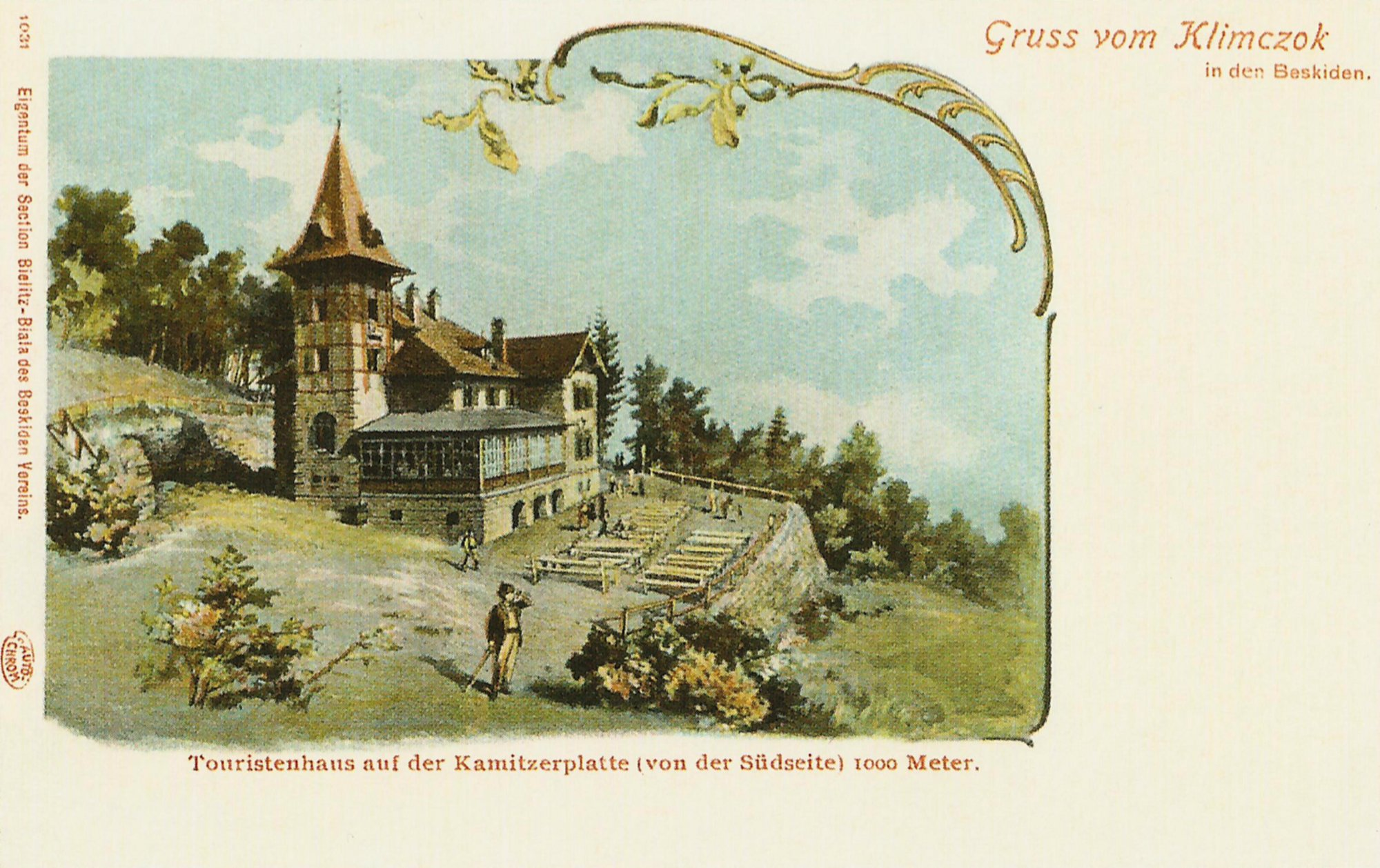
Szyndzielna mountain hut – around 1907

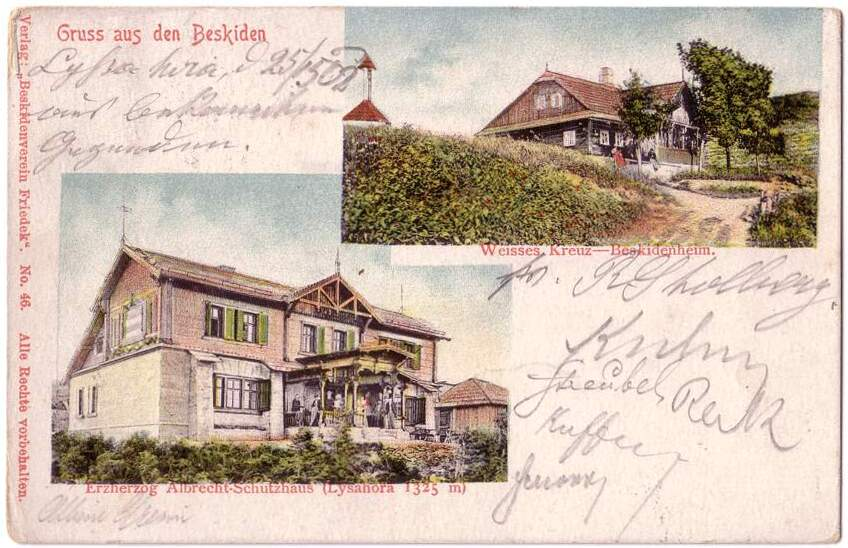
Postcard from 1902, showing the mountain hut on Lysá hora and Biały Krzyż

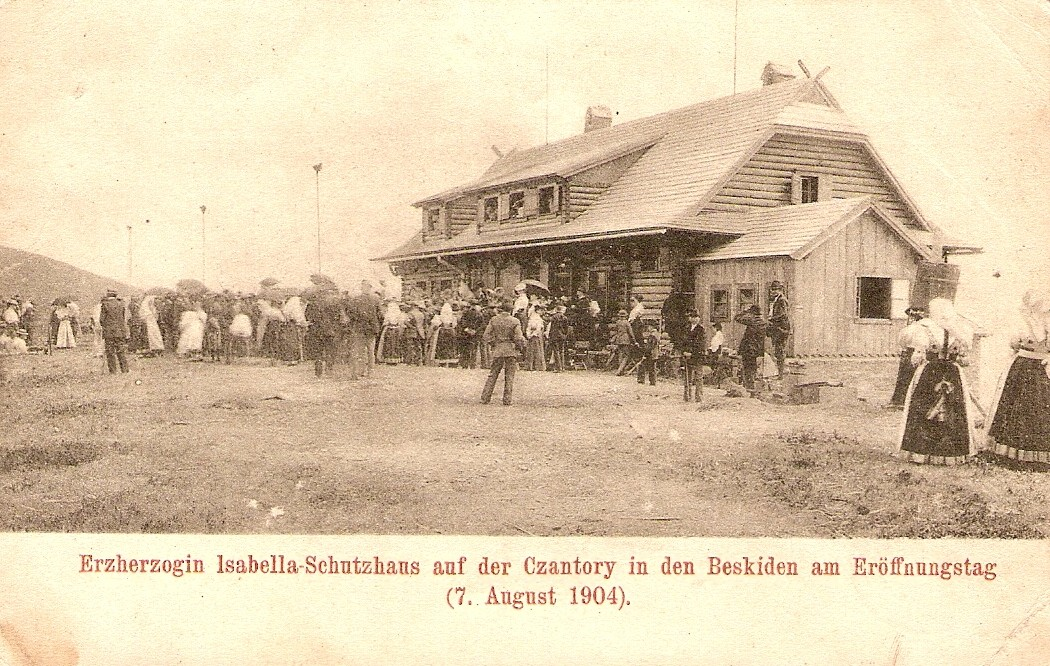
Opening of the mountain hut on Czantoria in 1904

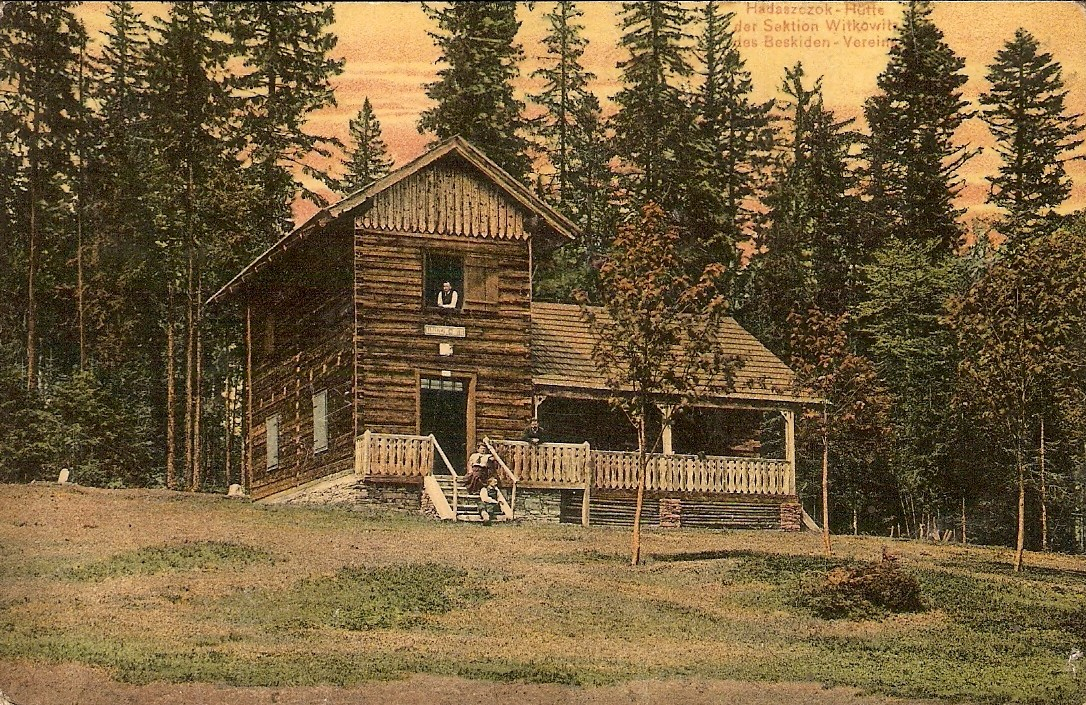
Hadaszczok–Hütte – postcard from 1907

Beskidenverein promoted both mountain tourism and skiing, but above all, it built the first true mountain huts in the Beskids (lodging facilities already existed in the mountains before, but they were not typical tourist shelters – they were used by aristocrats and hunting clubs, not tourists). Before World War I, they were opened in the following locations:

- Jaworowy (Jaworowy, Gross Jaworowy) – April 1895; it was built by the Cieszyn section. It was the first true mountain hut in the Beskids (Erzherzog–Friedrich–Schutzhaus in honor of Archduke Friedrich of the Cieszyn line of the Habsburgs), very popular among tourists (already eight days after opening, the thousandth guest arrived, and on average, 6,000 people visited the facility within a year);
- Lysá hora (Lysa–Berg, Kahlberg) – 1895, created by the joint efforts of five sections under the name Erzherzog–Albrecht–Schutzhaus. The patron was Archduke Albrecht, who died that year. In 1908, on the trail leading to the summit, the Ostrauer Hütte was opened as a resting place for less experienced tourists. The facility on the summit was managed by the Main Board of Beskidenverein, while Ostrauer Hütte was managed by the Moravian Ostrava section;
- Szyndzielnia (Kamitzerplatte) – 1897. It was the first mountain hut (Schutzhaus auf dem Kamitzerplatte) in the Beskids that currently belong to Poland, still existing after expansion. In 1907, on the occasion of the 10th anniversary of the shelter's establishment, a wooden cottage in Swiss style was added, intended as an additional shelter. The land under the shelter became the property of the association only in 1940, after a long lease period. It was managed by the Bielsko section. In 1906, next to the hut, a botanical garden (alpine garden) called the Beskidy Garden was established – it covered about 400 m^{2} and had 350 plants of 120 species. The idea was proposed by Dr. Eduard Schnack, a Beskidenverein member, museum curator, and naturalist. The garden exists to this day;
- Bílý Kříž (Weisses Kreuz) in the range of Malý Polom – in 1897, the inn and hut Beskidenheim were leased from a Czech owner; in its place, in 1902, the Vitkovice section opened a new, larger hut Schutzhütte Weisse Kreuz. In 1907, a summer villa called Josefinenheim was made available to tourists, named after the wife of a great friend and donor of Beskidenverein, Friedrich Schuster;
- Slavíč – 1898 or 1899; a small mountain hut (Hadaszczok–Hütte) dedicated to the memory of Johann Hadaszczok, the second president of Beskidenverein, who died in 1895 shortly after a mountain hike (he had serious health problems). Managed by the Vitkovice section;
- Magurka (Josefsberg) – 1903, burned twice, in 1907 and 1912, rebuilt twice under the name Erzherzogin Maria Theresia – Schutzhaus auf dem Josefsberg. It exists to this day;
- Czantoria Wielka (Großer Czantory-Berg) – 1904 as Erzherzogin Isabella – Schutzhaus auf dem Großer Czantory-Berg (the patron was Isabella von Croy-Dülmen, wife of Archduke Friedrich, the then Duke of Cieszyn). Built and managed by the Cieszyn section. It exists to this day;
- Babia Góra (Teufelspitze) – built in 1905 as Schlesinger-Schutzhaus (named after Wilhelm Schlesinger, who contributed greatly to the Beskid Association). Until the 1930s, it was the highest located mountain hut in the Carpathians. It was located in Hungary, and after the border regulation in Orava in 1920, it became part of Poland. In 1933, the State Forest Directorate from Lviv contested Beskidenverein's right to the land on which the hut stood, and after a court case, it was taken over by Germans in 1938 (actually, in 1936, it was transferred to the State Forest Cooperative "Leśnik" from Lviv). Until 1939, it functioned as a Polish shelter, popularly called Leśnik. Currently, it no longer exists – deprived of a caretaker in 1948, it was destroyed by a fire, and the ruins were demolished to the foundations in 1980. Since 1905, there was also a guestbook with an appeal in three languages – German, Hungarian, and Polish. Earlier, in 1904, Beskidenverein installed a box with a memorial book for tourists at the top of Babia Góra, according to which an average of about 400 people visited the summit at the turn of the 19th and 20th centuries.

At Klimczok, in the years 1894–1895, at the initiative of the association, the existing wooden hut from 1872, which mainly served hunters (called Klementinenhütte after the name of the owner of these lands – Klementyna von Primavesi), was expanded. Unfortunately, the building was destroyed by fire three times (in 1895 during the opening after the expansion, in 1910, and in 1913). Consequently, with the support of Beskidenverein, a new stone hut was built in 1914, which has survived to the present day.

All mentioned huts had restaurants, and accommodation was possible in separate rooms for "ladies" and "gentlemen". At the beginning of the 20th century, accommodation cost 1.60 krones, while a mattress cost 60 halerzys. With the exception of Hadaszczok–Hütte, the facilities were open all year round.

In 1894, on the slopes of Dębowiec (Seniorberg), in the former hunting lodge of the Sułkowski princes, the association opened a tavern (Baumgärtel). However, this was not a typical mountain hut, and in the early years, it mainly served as a resting place for tourists heading from Bielsko to Szyndzielnia. Only later did it begin to offer accommodation. It still exists and serves tourists as a gastronomic facility.

A wooden shelter was also built on Romanka (known as Ski-hütte), intended for skiers, but it was destroyed during World War I by highlanders. (Note: According to another version, it was only in 1919 that it was set on fire by "unknown perpetrators".)

Already in this period, conflicts arose between the association and Polish and Czech organizations. Germans mainly used the German language on their signs, markings, and in huts (it was mandatory for Beskidenverein members); however, there were also Hungarian inscriptions on Babia Góra, and sporadically Polish and Czech ones. Poles and Czechs demanded bilingual names, to which Germans did not agree, arguing that German-speaking tourists constituted a significant majority on the trails.

=== Organization of leisure activities for children ===
Similarly to other German tourist organizations, Beskidenverein also decided to organize summer camps for children as a way to promote active tourism from a young age. The section from Moravian Ostrava started sending children to Jablunkov in 1901, and from 1903 to Poruba. In 1908, they transferred the organization of the summer camps to an independent association called Fereinheim.

In addition to organizing summer camps, Beskidenverein initiated charitable actions towards local poor German or highlander children at the end of the 19th century. Clothing, footwear, and sweets were distributed during these initiatives.

=== Popularization of skiing ===
In 1907, the Bielsko section established the Winter Sports Club (Wintersportclub Bielitz-Biala des Beskidensvereines), which promoted winter sports, mainly skiing, among Silesian and Lesser Poland Germans. After World War I, it participated in the founding of the Polish Ski Association. The best skier from the Winter Sports Club, Teodor Winschenk (Weinschenck), became a three-time Polish champion during the interwar period and represented Poland in alpine skiing events at the 1936 Winter Olympics. This section quickly separated from the parent organization, and its history followed a separate path.

In January 1906, before the establishment of the Winter Sports Club, six skiers from Zabrze, belonging to Beskidenverein, were the first to reach the summit of Diablak. They started their route in Jeleśnia, braving difficult weather conditions, then headed to Jałowiecka pass, and after conquering the "Queen of the Beskids", they spent the night in the hut under Babia Góra (which was normally closed in winter at that time). (Note: The first Polish ski ascent to the top of Babia Góra took place in 1908.)

The first skiing competitions under the patronage of Beskidenverein took place in 1907 on the slopes of Lysá hora, with 32 participants. It was for the needs of skiers, among others, that Ostrauer Hütte was built, as well as ski shelters on Romanka (in 1912) and Skrzyczne (in 1924).

Frequent competitions and training courses were also organized on the sub-peak clearings of Magurka.

=== Cooperation with other tourist associations ===
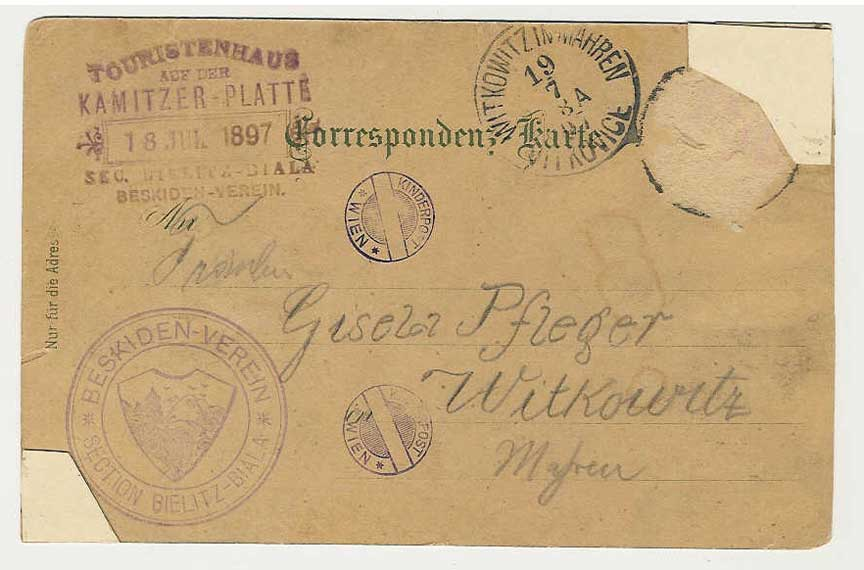
Correspondence card from the mountain hut on Szyndzielnia (1897)

The authorities of Beskidenverein were aware that cooperation between mountain associations would be crucial for promoting tourism. Within the German Empire and Austria-Hungary, there were many similar organizations, mainly German, focusing their activities on various mountain ranges.

In 1895, an exhibition was organized in Cieszyn, which illustrated the past activities of Beskidenverein and emphasized the beauty of the Beskids. Associations from other mountain ranges were also invited to participate.

In 1899, the Bielsko section of Beskidenverein proposed an exchange of discounts to the Moravian-Silesian Sudeten Mountain Association. Its members were to receive discounts at the shelter on Szyndzielnia, administered by the Bielsko section, in exchange for discounts at Sudeten shelters. The Main Board of Moravian-Silesian Sudeten Mountain Association initially accepted the proposal favorably but ultimately rejected it, resolving that the exchange of discounts could only occur between associations, not with a single section.

It wasn't until 1902 that Beskidenverein entered into a multilateral agreement for cooperation and discount exchange. Besides Moravian-Silesian Sudeten Mountain Association, numerous sections from the German and Austrian Alpine Club (Deutscher und Oesterreichischer Alpenverein, DuÖAV), the German Tourist Association from Brno (Verein deutscher Touristen in Brünn), and several other smaller organizations signed the agreement (totaling over 50 sections and over 100 shelters). The agreement was terminated in 1906 due to financial reasons; it was not advantageous for the alpine associations whose members rarely visited the Beskids or the Sudetes. In 1913, Beskidenverein members regained discounts at Moravian-Silesian Sudeten Mountain Association huts, and from 1914, Beskidenverein huts applied the same discounts to members of the Moravian-Silesian association.

== Division of the Beskidenverein after World War I ==
The activities of the Beskidenverein continued after World War I. Silesia, which had previously belonged to the Habsburg monarchy, was divided between Poland and Czechoslovakia, while the former Prussian Silesia was divided between Poland and the Weimar Republic. The fate of individual sections of the Beskidenverein, which found themselves on different sides of the border, began to diverge, depending on the country they were in. In practice, two separate organizations (Polish and Czechoslovak) emerged, which, however, cooperated with each other.

== Activities of the Beskidenverein in independent Poland ==
The Polish Beskidenverein actively competed with Polish tourist organizations, as evidenced by the "paintbrush war" on the slopes of Babia Góra, which dates back to the first decade of the 20th century. (Note: The activists of the Beskidenverein and the Polish Tatra Association painted over and destroyed each other's boards and tourist signs.) Initially, the contacts between these two organizations were not bad, and the Tatra Association (as the Polish Tatra Association was called before 1920) was even a member of the Beskidenverein, and both organizations granted each other discounts. However, in 1904/1905, the conflict escalated when the Tatra Association decided to establish a branch covering the Beskids and to build a mountain hut at Markowe Szczawiny. At that time, the Poles decided to stop granting discounts to Beskidenverein members, although formally they did not withdraw from its structures. Conflicts continued after 1918, practically until the end of the interwar period. Short periods of cooperation were interspersed with a struggle for tourists, often conducted illegally, such as sabotaging opponents' trails. The main reason for this rivalry was the national issue – Beskidenverein promoted German identity and mainly served German tourists, while the Tatra Association sought to limit German influence.

The Polish state made attempts to force the Beskidenverein to merge with the Tatra Association in order to limit its influence in the Beskids (which was not done in relation to other tourist organizations). German facilities were meticulously controlled, Tatra cards for crossing the mountain border with Czechoslovakia were not issued, (Note: The authority to issue Tatra cards was held by the Tatra Association, which the Beskidenverein never recognized.) and sabotage occurred (not only trail repainting, which both sides engaged in, but also arson). German activists complained that in the reports of Polish commissioners, better-equipped Beskidenverein mountain huts fared worse than Polish ones. Another activity was the placement of Polish facilities near existing German buildings – this avoided cumbersome building procedures, and German huts had fewer tourists. Beskidenverein, due to its economic activity, had to pay taxes, while Polish tourist organizations were exempt as public utility entities. This raised frequent suspicions and grievances among Polish Germans that the Polish state did not treat them the same as their Polish counterparts.

Similarly to before the war, the strongest section in independent Poland was the Bielsko section, which took on an informal leading role in Beskidenverein (in meetings with other tourist organizations, Polish Beskidenverein often appeared as Beskidenverein Bielsko) – it was the most active and had the largest number of members (the largest number of Germans in Polish Silesia and western Lesser Poland lived in Bielsko and Biała). Bielsko also became the main headquarters of the Polish part of Beskidenverein, which, according to Polish law, could not be part of a foreign association, so it separated from the sections that ended up in Czechoslovakia.

In 1927, the Society had about 4,000 members, in 1933 5,000 members, but later their number gradually decreased – in 1936 it was supposed to be about 1,600, but this value seems understated.

The strongest section from Bielsko had 2,300 members in 1927 (compared to 1,035 in 1911), and in 1931 – 2,600.

In the second half of the 1930s, some Beskidenverein activists' alignment with the Jungdeutsche Partei – which supported Hitler and pursued an anti-Polish policy – cast a shadow over the association. Some Beskidenverein members were also members of the "Young German Party" and used association facilities for supervision and espionage purposes.

=== Attempts at agreement and conflicts with the Polish Tatra Association ===
In the early 1920s, the Tatra Association proposed to Beskidenverein to join the Polish organization as a separate branch (this was also demanded by Polish authorities) – Beskidenverein did not respond to this proposal, fearing absorption by the Poles and seeing it as an attack on its own sovereignty and the longstanding tradition of pioneering tourism in the Beskids. In areas where trail blazing activities were conducted, attempts were made to obtain exclusivity.

In 1927, the Union of Beskidy Associations in Poland (Verband Beskidenvereine in Polen) was established with its main headquarters in Bielsko. It was formed by non-Polish tourist organizations to have greater impact in competition with Polish organizations. In addition to Beskidenverein, the Society of Friends of Nature (Naturfreunde) from Bielsko and Aleksandrowice (Alexanderfeld), the Winter Sports Club from Bielsko (which soon after its establishment separated from the "mountain" Beskidenverein), the Jewish Sports Society Makkabi from Bielsko, and the German Alpine Club, which had its section in Katowice since 1913 and counted 307 members in 1930, were included. At that time, Beskidenverein also competed with Polish organizations in terms of membership fees – at the end of the 1920s, the fee was 5 złoty plus 1 złoty entrance fee, which entitled members to a 50% discount at mountain huts belonging to the Beskidy Associations in Poland and Czechoslovakia (and at facilities of affiliated organizations) – at the same time, the Tatra Association charged 18 złoty and 5 złoty, respectively.

In early 1928, a dispute erupted over the expansion of the mountain hut on Babia Góra – Poles protested, fearing that a larger German hut would marginalize the facility at Markowe Szczawiny and simultaneously pointing out that the expansion would take place in a nature-protected area. The Nowy Targ County sided with the Tatra Association and prohibited work on the German hut. In response to this situation, Beskidenverein decided to build a new facility in another part of the Beskids – in Hala Lipowska.

In October 1928, a joint conference was held at the Tatra Association premises in Katowice to end the conflict. Beskidenverein appeared as the Beskidy Associations in Poland, representing existing branches from Bielsko and Biała, Cieszyn, Pszczyna, Nowy Bytom, Królewska Huta, and other allied organizations. The Poles agreed to let Beskidenverein conduct trail blazing according to its system in the areas around Magura, Klimczok, Błatnia, and Skrzyczne (where it was most active), (Note: The mountain hut on Błatnia was built by Naturfreunde. Skrzyczne, on the other hand, was in the association's circle of interest because of the German skiers who often visited the mountain.) while the trail from Przyborów to Babia Góra would remain under German supervision, but with Tatra Association trail blazing. The Polish organization did not rule out enlarging the "zone of influence" of Beskidenverein but demanded restrictions on activities in the area from Cieszyn to Babia Góra (thus in the southern regions of Polish Silesian and Żywiec Beskids), where Tatra Association already dominated.

In 1929, another meeting of delegates from both organizations took place, this time in Cieszyn. Once again, the territorial scope of Beskidenverein's activities was established (it did not differ significantly from that in Katowice) – Little Beskids on the left bank of the Soła river, the Klimczok group (including Błatnia) up to the Beskidek pass between Brenna and Szczyrk, the route to Skrzyczne, and the trails to the mountain hut on Babia Góra and to the Salmopolska pass. At the same time, Beskidenverein activists definitively refused to join the Polish Tatra Association and recognize its authority.

In 1931, Beskidenverein joined the Union of Polish Tourist Associations in Warsaw (established in 1927), but this did not lead to any specific solutions; too many different organizations were part of it, often representing conflicting interests, and numerous conflicts led to its dissolution in 1937.

The agreement reached in Katowice and Cieszyn lasted only until 1931 when the Polish Tatra Association obtained exclusivity from the Ministry of Public Works for conducting tourist activities in the mountains – all other organizations were required to coordinate their activities with Polish Tatra Association. Naturally, Beskidenverein activists did not accept this state of affairs. Unable to expand the mountain hut on Babia Góra, they appealed to the ministry for funding to build a new facility on Hala Lipowska. However, it turned out that the necessary funds had already been allocated to Polish Tatra Association, with whom the matter of construction and any potential subsidies needed to be discussed. The Poles positively assessed the needs of Beskidenverein but allocated funds for the repair of hiking trails and current maintenance in existing huts. They did not approve the construction of a new German facility, arguing that it was outside the "zone of influence" agreed upon in Katowice in 1928. Beskidenverein did not accept Polish Tatra Association's authority to decide on the location of new huts and, as a legal purchaser of the appropriate land, commenced construction after obtaining the necessary administrative permits. By the end of 1931, the foundation had been laid, and the structure was winterized to accommodate tourists. It was officially opened in August of the following year (during World War II, it operated under the name Dr. Stonawski-Schutzhaus); after numerous renovations, it continues to serve its purpose to this day.

In 1931, the Polish Tourist Association officially recognized all contacts with Beskidenverein as severed. At a meeting of one of the subcommittees, it was also decided, among other things, to demarcate the areas previously allocated to Beskidenverein between its own branches and to request the relevant county offices not to issue building permits without Polish Tatra Association's consent. (Note: It was coming to a situation that Beskidenverein did not want to come to terms with – that the Polish Tatra Association was to decide who could build hostels. This undoubtedly restricted the activities of other associations.) In a less official manner, the Poles also intended to draw the authorities' attention to what they considered suspicious political activities by Beskidenverein, and the Border Guard was to carefully monitor tourists of German nationality moving along the trails without mountain passes (which were issued only by Polish Tatra Association). Other proposals included conducting a propaganda campaign in the editorial offices of the most popular Polish newspapers, taking action to remove Beskidenverein from the Union of Polish Tourist Associations in Warsaw, and excluding all Beskidenverein members who were also members of Polish Tatra Association from the Polish society.

The attitude of the state towards Beskidenverein changed in 1934 when in January Poland and Germany signed a declaration of non-aggression. In 1935, the Ministry of Communication demanded that Polish Tatra Association and Union of Polish Tourist Associations start inviting Beskidenverein as an equal partner to discuss tourist affairs, but the Territorial Conciliation Commission (composed of Polish Tatra Association and Union of Polish Tourist Associations activists) rejected this demand using procedural and regulatory loopholes.

Some improvement in mutual relations occurred in 1936 – Beskidenverein took into account Polish demands to lower prices in mountain huts, which was aimed at popularizing tourism (for example, in the shelter on Hala Lipowska, Beskidenverein members paid 1.20 złoty for accommodation, non-member tourists paid 2.30 złoty, while school and group trips had significant discounts – 1.50 złoty and the possibility of negotiation down to 0.80 złoty, respectively).

The escalation of the international situation cast a shadow on mountain tourism – in 1937, Hala Lipowska was included in the border zone, which resulted in restrictions on tourist traffic; the reason was suspicions of the shelter owners' anti-Polish activities. These suspicions later proved to be unfounded, also in relation to the owner of the nearby shelter on Hala Rysianka, which was officially a "Polish" facility. However, since the shelters on Rysianka (located closer to the border) were not included in the border zone, Beskidenverein activists perceived the Polish authorities' move as another harassment towards them. In 1939, due to increasing Polish-German tension, access to the Lipowska mountain hut was completely blocked.

In the same year, in Szczyrk, the Beskidenverein skiing championships took place. Thanks to the favorable attitude of the Polish state, a radio broadcast of the event was conducted on the waves of German radio – this was an unprecedented event in the history of sports events in the Silesian Beskids.

According to the last pre-war registry in August 1939, the Polish Beskidenverein had 1882 members – mainly from Upper Silesia, but also from distant cities, including Chojnice, Grudziądz, Gdańsk, Leszno, Poznań, Stanisławów, Toruń, and Warsaw.

=== New mountain huts in independent Poland ===
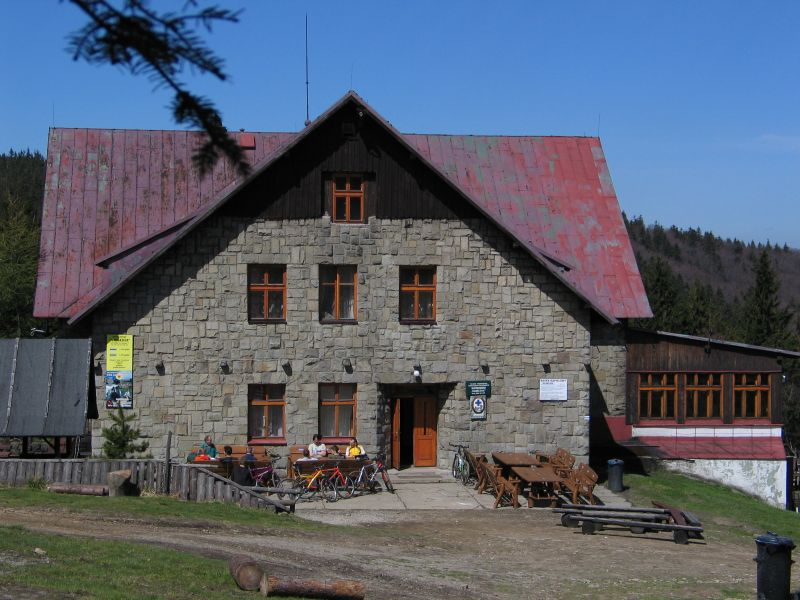
Mountain hut on Klimchok (former Klementinenhütte), present view

In addition to the aforementioned shelter on Hala Lipowska, Beskidenverein also acquired further shelters:

- Kozia Góra (Rodelhütte, commonly known as Stefanka after the name of the Beskidenverein president, Dr. Karol Steffan) – 1926;
- Klimczok (Klementinenhütte) – the facility was leased in 1930 from its previous owner, Baron Klobus from Łodygowice, preempting Polish Tatra Association.

There was also a tourist station named Biały Krzyż (White Cross) located in a school building on Salmopolska pass – it was destroyed in 1945 during a skirmish between partisans and German troops.

In 1924, a wooden ski shelter was built on Skrzyczne (Rauhkoppe, less commonly known as Skrzycznehütte), which survived until World War II. (Note: Although, according to Jurek, it was reported to have been plundered during the interwar period by "unknown perpetrators", who were allegedly associated with Polish Tatra Association and hostile to the German presence in the Beskids. Similarly, Poles were said to be responsible for setting fire to the shelter on Klimczok – however, this issue is problematic, as the Klementinenhütte was last destroyed by fire in 1914.)

Sometimes unconfirmed reports suggest that the mountain hut built in 1935 on Chrobacza Łąka also belonged to Beskidenverein. (Note: The shelter was supposed to be a response by Beskidenverein to the previously established Polish shelter near Magurka. However, since another Beskidenverein facility already existed nearby – on Magurka Wilkowicka – such an argument seems to lack basis in reality.)

== Beskidenverein in Czechoslovakia ==
After the fall of Austria-Hungary, the activity of the association continued, even in Czechoslovakia. Separated from the Polish sections by the border, the Czechoslovak Beskidenverein became practically and formally an independent organization, (Note: The Czechoslovak authorities demanded that the Beskidenverein (like other German organizations) limit its activities to the territory of Czechoslovakia, otherwise it was threatened with liquidation. Changes to the statute were necessary.) although it still cooperated with colleagues operating in Poland (Beskidenverein discounts were honored on both sides of the border). The main headquarters of the Czechoslovak part of the association became Moravian Ostrava.

After World War I, the section in Frýdlant nad Ostravicí ceased to operate, but new ones emerged in places like Fryštát, Kopřivnice, Karviná, and Jablunkov (the latter operated only for a few years), and later also in Fulnek. There were two sections in Cieszyn – on the Czechoslovak and Polish sides. In 1926, the Beskidenverein sections in Czechoslovakia gathered around 3,500 members (not much fewer than in Poland); the most numerous were from Cieszyn (the former headquarters of pre-war Beskidenverein, which remained on the Czechoslovak side of the border) and Vítkovice.

The Beskidenverein in Czechoslovakia also published its own magazine, with a name reminiscent of the pre-war one – Mitteilungen des Beskidenvereines. Sitz des Hauptvereines Mähr-Ostrau. Sometimes, in promoting tourism, it resorted to modern means – for example, in 1933, a silent film Wir und die Beskiden was presented in Moravian Ostrava. Competitions with mountain themes were also organized by Beskidenverein to encourage hiking.

At the time of the creation of Czechoslovakia, Beskidenverein was one of the largest tourist organizations in the country. Its role remained significant throughout the entire period of the Republic, however, similar to in the Polish Republic, the association's activities sometimes met with reluctance and suspicion from the authorities, to which German activists reacted similarly. Nationalistic accents, which Beskidenverein never fully wanted to abandon, created constant conflicts, as did matters of signage and markings – under pressure from Czechoslovak authorities, Germans were forced to replace German descriptions with bilingual ones, but they did so with great resistance.

=== Cooperation with other German tourist associations ===
In the new conditions of the Czechoslovak Republic, Germans, as the ruling nation, became the largest national minority. In order to defend common interests, broader cooperation became necessary, also among German tourist associations, of which there were dozens in Czechoslovakia.

In 1920, in Ústí nad Labem, the Union of German Mountain and Hiking Clubs in the Czechoslovak Republic (Hauptverband deutscher Gebirgs- und Wandervereine in der Tschechoslowakischen Republik, HDGW) was founded, which was to represent German organizations before the government in Prague. Czechoslovak sections of the Beskidenverein joined the union in 1923 – members were entitled to discounts on railway journeys, various benefits in different places in Czechoslovakia, facilitations in border traffic with Germany, accident insurance, and the possibility of receiving state subsidies (which, however, were rarely granted and were small). German mountain and hiking organizations, after initial resistance (mainly regarding the amount of contributions), willingly joined the HDGW, and in 1928, 51 organizations belonged to it, almost all operating in Czechoslovakia. The activities of the union focused, apart from contacts with the government, on joint promotion of tourism, especially among German youth (hiking camps were organized in Germany), and jointly organized large events such as German Hiking Day. HDGW published its own monthly tourist magazine Deutsches Bergland.

In 1938, all German mountain associations in Czechoslovakia and almost all hiking associations belonged to the union – a total of 83 associations, with 70,000 members. HDGW operated until the annexation of the Sudetenland by the Third Reich, and then under a changed name and in changed political conditions until 1942.

In addition to the general Czechoslovak cooperation, Beskidenverein also decided to create an agreement between mountain associations of Moravia, Silesia, and Slovakia. It was to include, among others, the Carpathian Association (Karpathenverein, KV) (Note: An organization operating in the Czechoslovak Carpathian Mountains, mainly in the Tatra Mountains. Its members were mostly Germans.) and MSSGV. Initially, the main goal was to exchange discounts between organizations (there was no mutual discount exchange in HDGW; individual associations regulated it in separate agreements between themselves). Until 1922, there was an old pre-war agreement between Beskidenverein and MSSGV – after a three-year break, the Czech Beskidenverein granted discounts in its shelters to members of MSSGV sections from Opava.

In 1928, a meeting of representatives from both sides of the border, as well as from KV and MSSGV, and representatives of Polish and Czechoslovak authorities took place in Český Těšín. It was decided to establish a free working group without official status (Arbeitsgemanschatf), which informally also included the Kłodzko Mountain Association, and the Polish Beskidenverein ultimately remained outside the group but could always count on its "help and support". It was agreed that mutual discounts in tourist facilities would take the form of supplementary stamps affixed to the membership cards of their respective organizations (Polish Beskidenverein and Karpathenverein joined this system in 1931). Initially, there was not much interest in the discounts (for example, in 1930, only 49 out of 1444 members of MSSGV in Opava purchased Beskidenverein stamps). Czech sections of Beskidenverein also signed mutual discount agreements with the Prague Tourist Club and the Alpine Association Donauland. In addition to the discount issues, the working group worked on a proposal for free border crossing between Poland and Czechoslovakia based on tourist ID cards, which was to be presented to the governments in Warsaw and Prague, but these demands were not understood by the authorities until the outbreak of World War II. The working group also planned to cooperate with the Czechoslovak Tourist Club and the Pohorská jednota "Radhošť". Furthermore, MSSGV and GGV promised to promote the Beskids in the main areas of their activity.

In the 1930s, the activity of the working group significantly declined. In 1934, the Ost und West cell was established, which was to organize group trips for members of Beskidenverein and Carpathian Association to the Jeseníky Mountains, and for MSSGV to the Beskids and Carpathians. In 1937, trips to the Tatra Mountains were planned, but it is not known whether they took place. The last meeting of the working group took place in Moravská Ostrava in 1938, and after the Sudetenland was annexed to the Reich, it ceased to exist.

Some mountain sections also had winter sports sections, which were part of the Union of German Winter Sports Clubs (Hauptverband der deutschen Wintersportvereine). There were 8 such sections – in Vítkovice, Český Těšín, Karviná, Moravská Ostrava, Bohumín, Frýdek, Místek, and Kopřivnice.

=== Beskidenverein mountain huts in Czechoslovakia ===
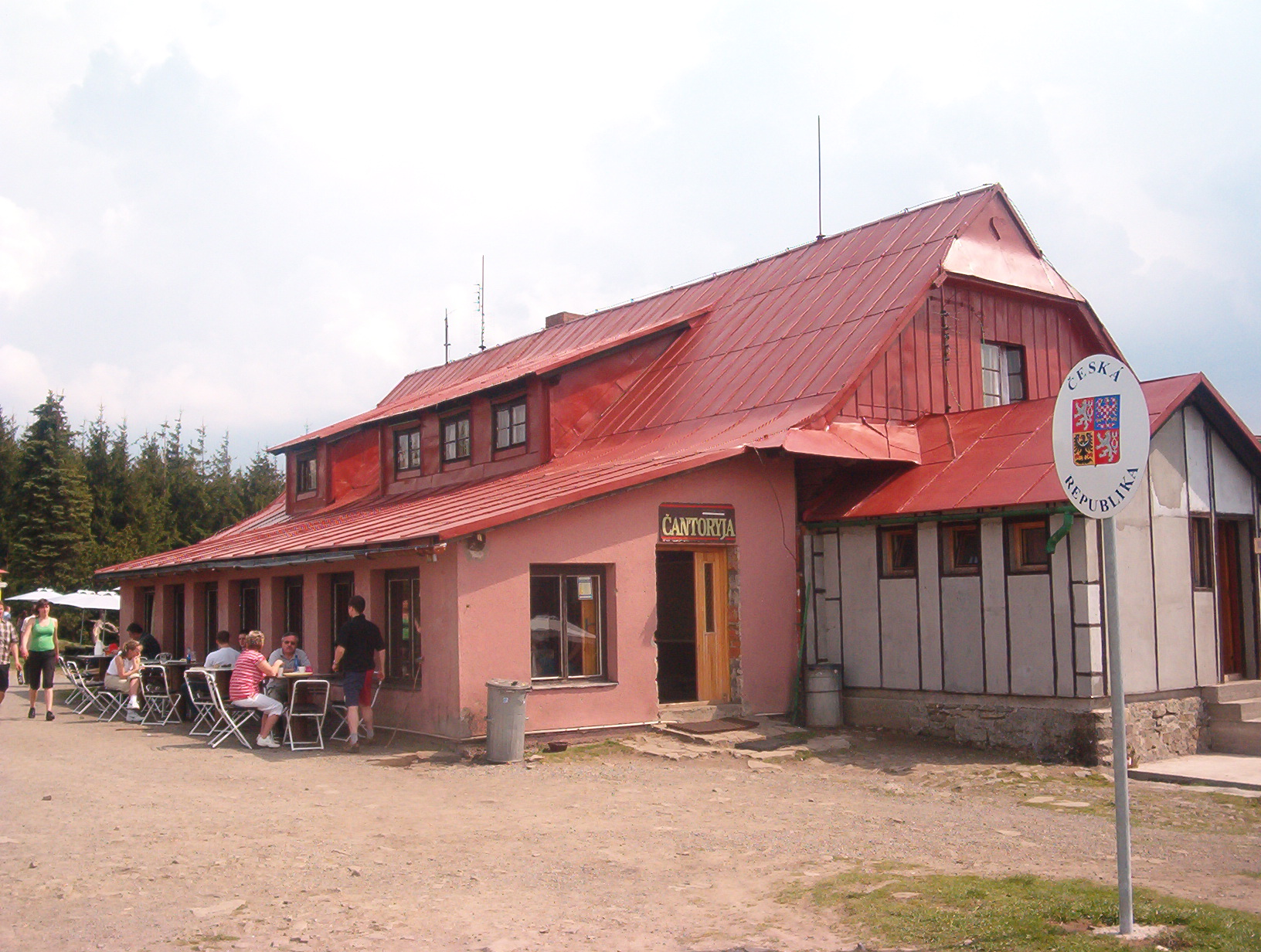
Mountain hut on Czantoria – present state

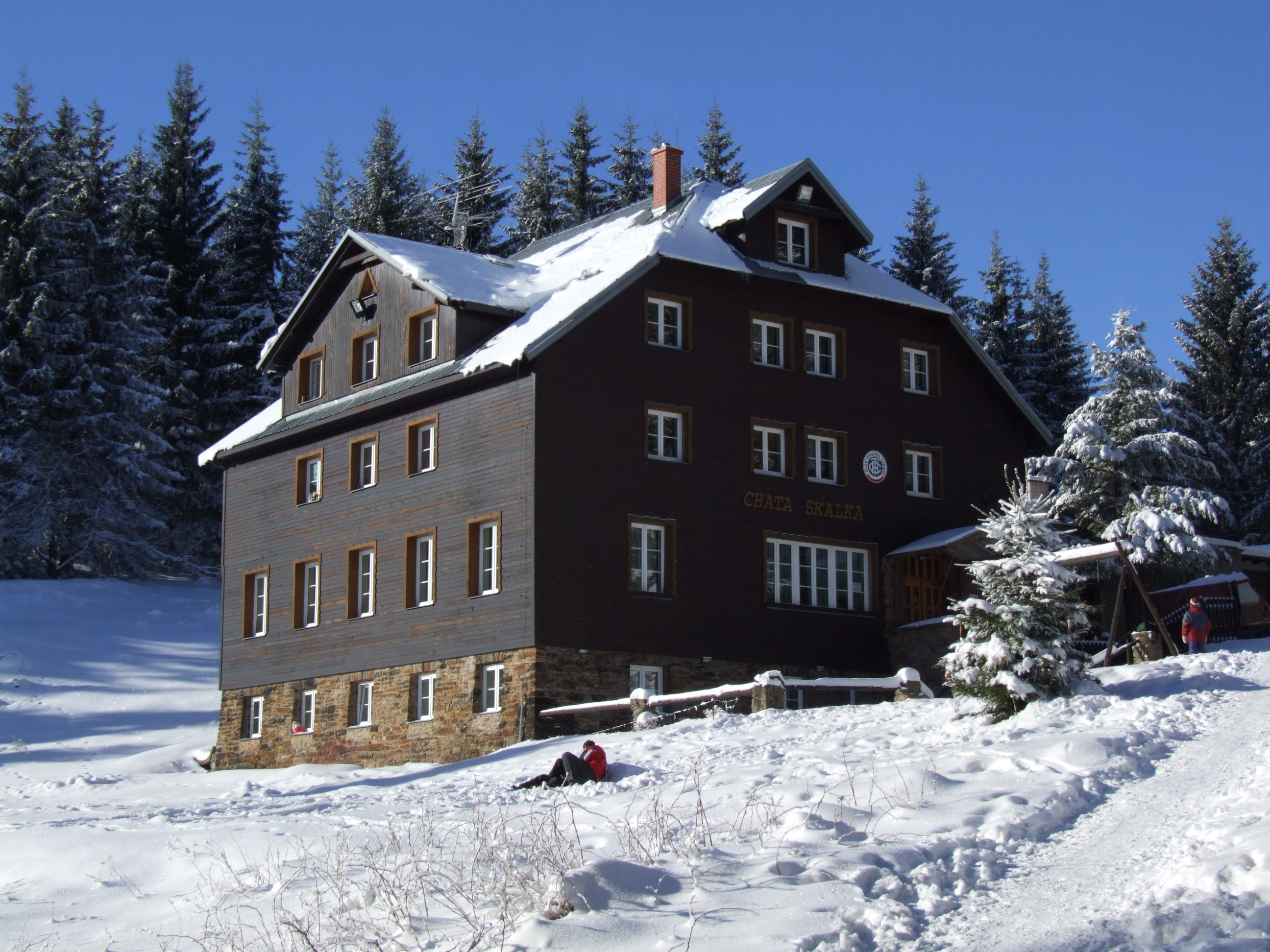
Mountain hut on Skalka (Chata Skalka) – present state

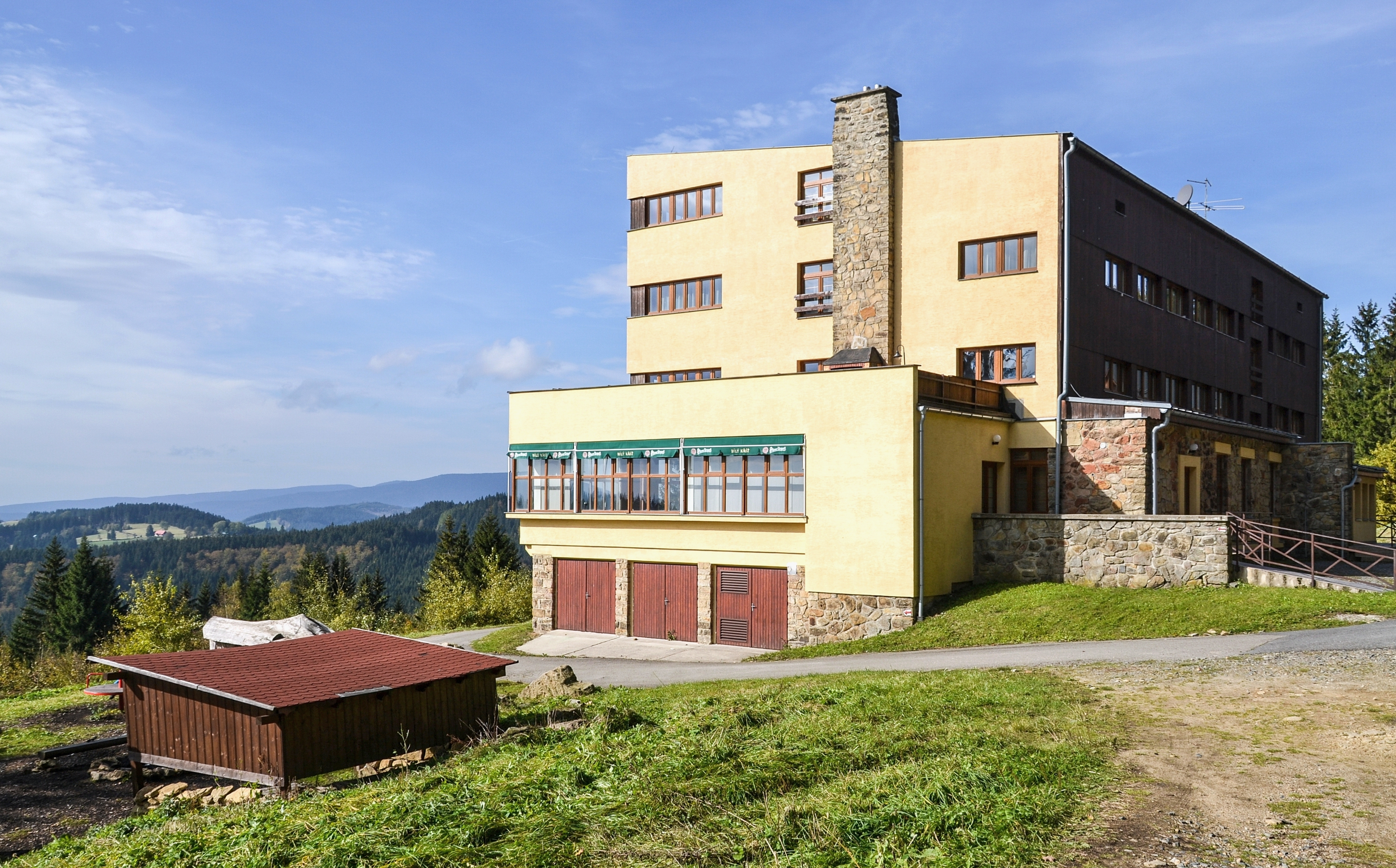
Berghotel on Biały Krzyż – as of 2016

After a few years of inactivity due to the uncertain situation on the border and lack of funds, the Beskidenverein resumed investments in accommodation facilities, although not as large as before the war.

- The mountain hut on Czantoria Wielka (Großer Czantory-Berg) now lay in the border zone between Czechoslovakia and Poland. Plundered and devastated in 1918, it underwent renovation and reopened in 1923;
- At Biały Krzyż, Germans purchased additional land and erected a two-story hotel, Weisse Kreuz, in 1924 (the foundation stone was laid as early as 1914). The structure was wooden and fell victim to a fire in 1936. Even earlier, in 1927, the old facility from 1902 burned down, leaving tourists without accommodation. Fortunately, Weisse Kreuz was insured for a large sum, and in 1937, the grand opening of the new, luxurious modernist-style Berghotel was celebrated;
- on Lysá hora (Lysa-Berg–Kalhberg), the Erzherzog–Albrecht–Schutzhaus began to run out of space for all those in need, prompting the Beskidenverein to build a new accommodation facility, the Steinerne Haus, in 1933. Additionally, in 1926, the Ostrauer Hütte underwent significant expansion;
- The Cieszyn section built a small mountain hut on Chata Skalka near Mosty u Jablunkova in just three months in 1928;
- The Hadaszczok-Hütte on Slavíč was taken over by the Bohumin section from the Vitkovice section, and after renovation in 1936, it was reopened to tourists; Josef Ruminsky became the lessee. Near the old shelter, a new Czech facility, Kolářova chata Slavíč, was opened in 1931; the owner was Jan Kolář, a former policeman from Moravia and former lessee at Hadaszczok-Hütte since 1910.

=== Beskidenverein on the eve of war ===
Similarly to Poland, some members of the Beskidenverein became associated with the pan-German and Nazi movements in the 1930s, which were particularly active in the Sudetenland. They were involved in parties such as the Deutsche Nationalpartei, Sudetendeutsche Partei, and Deutsche Nationalsozialistische Arbeiterpartei. The Bohumin section was the most involved, closely monitored by the Czechoslovak police, who inspected the German premises several times. However, it turned out that even in this section, neither the leadership nor the majority of members belonged (at least formally) to the aforementioned parties.

After the Polish annexation of Trans-Olza in 1938, several Beskidenverein mountain huts also found themselves within the borders of Poland – facilities on Jaworowy, Skalka, Slavíč Mountain, and Czantoria Wielka. However, there is no information about changes in the administration of these huts; they were managed by sections from areas that also became part of Poland – Cieszyn and Bohumin.

== Beskidenverein in the Weimar Republic ==
The situation of Beskidenverein in the German Reich became most difficult, as only three of the former German sections remained – in Bytom and Racibórz, which quickly ceased their activities, and in Wrocław. The distance and political obstacles caused the Wrocław section to necessarily limit its activity. In 1924, it became part of the Working Group of Silesian Mountain Societies (Arbeitsgemeinschaft der schlesischen Gebirgsvereine), an agreement between mountain associations in Wrocław, where common event dates were coordinated, joint appeals to the authorities regarding railway connections were made, and joint conferences were organized. Little is known about the participation of Beskidenverein members in these efforts, but it is known that the Working Group itself still existed in 1942.

== Beskidenverein during World War II ==
In November 1939, the manager of the association, Dr. Edward Stonawski, became the provisional administrator of the Babiogórski Branch of the Polish Tourist and Sightseeing Association (Beskidenverein also took over the branch's assets after Polish Tatra Association was dissolved), and Beskidenverein later received several Polish mountain huts (though significantly fewer than it had expected). These were located in Polish territories incorporated into the Third Reich, although the association also sought a building in Markowe Szczawiny located in the General Government. Dr. Stonawski invoked the merits of his organization and maintained contact with the previous owner, Rudolf Wielgus, whom they wanted to keep in his position. However, in the autumn of 1940, Markowe Szczawiny was taken over by the newly established Kraków branch of the German Alpine Club (Zweig Krakau des Deutschen Alpenvereins). Additionally, the shelter under Babia Góra was handed over to the Slovak Border Guard, which was a severe loss for the association, as they had hoped for its return to German management or at least its transfer to the Karpathenverein, an organization operating in Slovakia.

=== Establishment of the Main Beskid Association ===
Initially, after the war ended, Beskidenverein and its leadership received praises as an organization that had been a pioneering force in the fight for the German Beskids and German territory.

However, it quickly became apparent that the German authorities viewed Beskidenverein rather suspiciously. Nonetheless, Dr. Stonawski hoped that his organization would become the main administration for all German mountain associations in the Beskids. However, this did not happen. Firstly, in September 1939, the former Czechoslovak Beskidenverein was subordinated to the all-German association of mountain and hiking clubs (Reichsverband der Deutschen Gebirgs- und Wandervereine) based in Ústí nad Labem. Then, in June 1940, a founding meeting of the new Main Beskid Association (Beskidenhauptverein in Teschen) was held in Cieszyn, with its headquarters to be located in this town on the Olza river, (Note: According to some studies, the headquarters was located in Katowice.) where it was decided that individual associations from the Polish and Czechoslovak sides would become branches of this organization. However, Edward Stonawski was not elected president; (Note: The term "chief" was also used, as in other tourist organizations of the Third Reich.) instead, Dr. Krueger, the starosta of Cieszyn, was chosen. (Note: Or a starosta named Kate.)

In the course of establishing the joint association, the names of its members were specified – the Main Beskid Association in Cieszyn (Hauptverein Beskidenverein), while the remaining were designated as "branches" rather than "sections" (Zweigstelle Beskidenverein). In practice, the "old" Beskidenverein was subordinated to German administration and reduced to the role of one of the smaller organizations subordinate to the central association in the Reich.

The following branches became part of the merged association: Bielsko, Fryštát, Frýdek, Karviná, Bohumin, Cieszyn, (Note: The former Polish and Czechoslovak sections were merged, as was the city itself, into a single organism.) and Pszczyna from Silesia, Morawska Ostrawa, Mistek, and Vítkovice from the Protectorate of Bohemia and Moravia, as well as Kopřivnice, Fulnek, Bílovec, Nový Jičín, and Opava from the Sudetenland. Attempts were also made to reactivate the branch in Katowice and former sections in Racibórz, Królewska Huta, and Bytom, as well as to establish a new one in Gliwice. The establishment of a branch in Zabrze (Hindenburg) was successful.

It is difficult to estimate the number of association members during the war – it is known that the Bielsko branch had between 1500 and 1800 members from 1940 to 1942.

The last manifestation of activity was a brochure published in 1943, prepared to mark the half-century existence of Beskidenverein. Dr. Stonawski authored it, summarizing the history of the association briefly. "Beskidenverein in the Polish era fulfilled its duty as a German association and during that time paved the way for German identity in the east". In April of that year, the main branch from Moravian Ostrava was removed from the register of associations.

=== Former Polish and Czechoslovak mountain huts under German administration ===
The division of shelters was decided by the president of Katowice in agreement with the Eastern Commissioner, as authorized to take action in the areas newly annexed to the Reich. Most of them belonged to the Polish Tatra Association before the war, although the Germans took over both private huts and those that were within the borders of Czechoslovakia until 1938.

To the great disappointment of the association members, many facilities were given to other German organizations, not always related to tourism. Shelters on Kozubová (located in Czechoslovakia but managed by the Polish Tourist Society Beskid from Cieszyn), Malá Prašivá, and Ropička (Czechoslovak) were taken over by the Regional Youth Hostels Association in Silesia (Landesjugendherbergsverband Schlesien). The building in Zwardoń was taken over by the National Socialist Labour Organization Strength Through Joy for a short period until August 1940. Przysłop pod Baranią Górą was taken over by the State Forestry Administration, which leased it to the Winter Sports Club from Katowice, while the shelter on Velký Polom (previously in Czechoslovakia until 1938) was placed under the administration of the Regional Transport Association (Landesverkehrsverband), an industrial organization operating in various parts of the Reich, with the intention of establishing a Mountain Guest House there.

The Cieszyn branch of Beskidenverein received former Czechoslovak facilities on Gírová (Schutzhaus auf der Girova) and Ostrý (Schutzhaus auf dem Ostry), as well as Polish ones on Stożek Wielki and Równica. In the latter mountain hut, in exchange for signing Volksliste, the previous manager Rudolf Hulanik was allowed to remain. The attendance at Równica was high during the war, and besides the German language, Polish was also heard, which was tolerated by Hulanik.

A new branch was established in Żywiec, with Dr. Hering, the district administrator of Żywiec, as its chairman. He administered the former Polish huts on Przegibek and Hala Boracza (which belonged to the Jewish Sports Society Makkabi before the war), and later also in Zwardoń. The branch renovated the facility on Wielka Racza and built a new utility building. Since 1940, with Hering's approval, Bronisław Jarosz resumed his management of the mountain hut as before the war. Thanks to his efficient management, the hut was properly maintained until the end of the war, and it was only after the Germans withdrew that looters destroyed it.

The Bielsko branch received only Hala Miziowa, (Note: There was a rivalry over the facility between the Bielsko and Żywiec branches; it was eventually administered by the Beskidenverein of Bielsko (with the help of the pre-war owner, reichsdeustch Albert Rudolf), but set aside a separate "Żywiec room" in the building remaining exclusive to Żywiec activists.) and later Leskowiec, until a decision was made about its further affiliation (this decision was never made, and the shelter remained under the Beskidenverein's control until the end of the war). Due to its poor technical condition, lack of water, and its location in a heavily forested area, it did not accept tourists, and the previous caretaker, Jan Targosz, only ensured it was not completely destroyed. Perhaps in the future, the project for a shelter on Leskowiec, initiated by the president of Zabrze (who was also the president of the Zabrze branch), would also come under the administration of the union. However, the construction initiative never went beyond the planning stage.

The situation was different for private huts not belonging to the Polish Tatra Association. Skrzyczne was managed by a person of German origin, and it was often quartered there by the Wehrmacht. A similar situation (pre-war German owners – Naturfreunde organization) existed in Błatnia. Rysianka was officially a hut operating under the auspices of the Polish Tatra Skiing Association from Kraków, but the land and building remained the property of a private individual, Gustaw Pustelnik. He provided many services to the Third Reich (probably spying for the Germans before the war), so during the occupation, he retained control of the hut, turning it into a rest house for soldiers and organizing military skiing courses. Similarly, the shelter on Soszów Wielki belonged to private individuals – the Gajdzic family. Taking advantage of the owner's departure for forced labor, and later his call-up to the Wehrmacht, the Zabrze branch of Beskidenverein forced the owner's wife to lease the facility. However, they were unable to completely get rid of the former owners.

Even in shelters that belonged to the Beskidenverein before the war, the military or members of nationalist-socialist organizations were often quartered. For example, Hitler Youth members were stationed at Biały Krzyż, theoretically to assist in protecting the facilities from potential partisans, but towards the end of the war, when there was a threat, they quickly evacuated from the hut.

The benefits that the Beskidenverein derived from the mountain huts were purely prestigious (Polish owners who remained in their positions were supposed to take care of their technical condition and submit monthly reports on their activities – they were not entitled to compensation). The turnovers were small, although some pre-war tourists, numerous Germans, and military patrols (especially near the border with Slovakia) appeared in some facilities. The main source of income was the sale of alcohol. The profits were enough to maintain the caretakers, but not for more active operations. Moreover, groups of partisans often appeared in the forests. Towards the end of the war, the activity of the society practically ceased. Dr. Stonawski himself admitted several times in his letters that in the face of the difficult situation, the Beskidenverein was helpless – there were few tourists, restrictive regulations hindered movement, and many facilities were actually requisitioned for the needs of the German military and remained in the organization's records only on paper.

The Hitler period also marked the end of active cooperation between German tourist organizations – individual associations competed with each other for influence. Often, current politics were not determined by the needs of tourism but by the ambitions of the leader of a particular section or branch. Many organizations ceased to exist due to the decline in tourist traffic, lack of funds, or were forcibly incorporated into a larger association that was easier for the authorities to control. Additionally, the former system of discount exchange was greatly restricted – the Beskidenverein had a relevant agreement only with the Moravian-Silesian Sudeten Mountain Association, concluded in 1941.

== End of Beskidenverein's existence ==
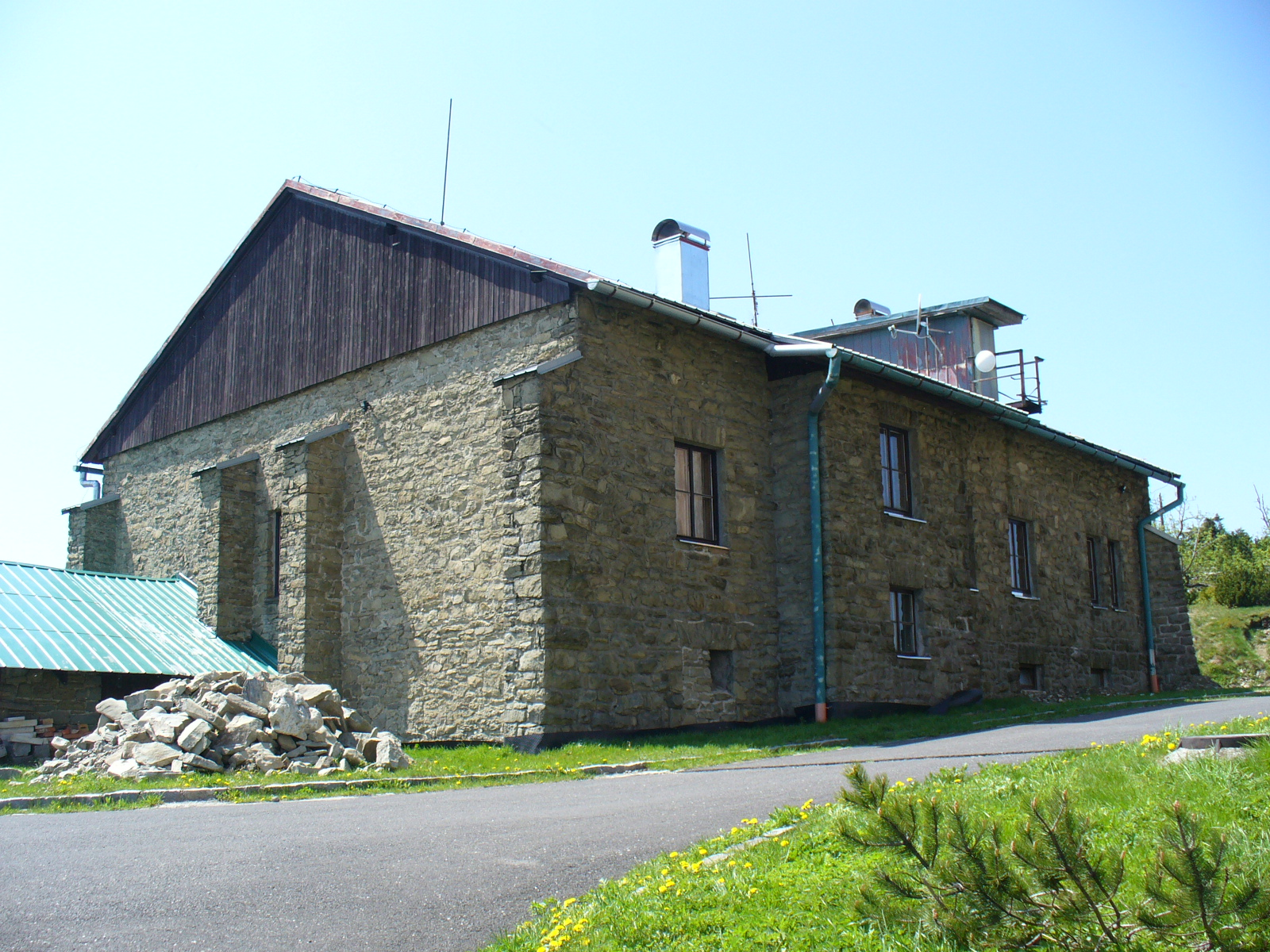
Steinerne Haus – present state

After World War II, the assets of the organization in Poland were often destroyed and plundered, and what remained of them was taken over by the Polish Tatra Association, and then by the Polish Tourist and Sightseeing Society, which remains its owner to this day. All the facilities are still operational (with the exception of the mountain hut on Babia Góra and the tourist station at Salmopolska pass), but they have been rebuilt – the hut on Hala Lipowska differs the most from the original.

In Czechoslovakia, the local branches of Beskidenverein were dissolved by the decree of the Ministry of Internal Affairs dated 20 May 1945. Then, based on Beneš decrees, the German residents were expelled, and their property (including mountain huts) was nationalized and transferred to various organizations, both tourist (such as the Czechoslovak Tourists Club) (Note: The Czechoslovak Tourist Club was disbanded in 1948 and was only reactivated after the fall of communism. The former Beskidenverein facilities thus belonged to it for a relatively short time.) and employee-owned. Most of them survived to the present day.

The state took over the facilities on Biały Krzyż, as well as the nearby Baron hotel (now on the Slovak side of the border under the name Kysuca), because its owner collaborated with the Germans during World War II. The former Berghotel was handed over to trade unions as a place of recreation for the "working people". Currently (in 2016), after thorough renovation, it operates as an apartment building.

Steinerne Haus on Lysá hora still exists to this day (run by Czech Tourists Club) and serves tourists as Bezručova chata na Lysé hoře, unlike the building patronized by Archduke Albrecht, which burned down in 1972. Ostrauer Hütte, now Ostravská chata, still operates on the red trail leading to the peak. The first mountain hut built by Beskidenverein on Javorový (which also operated during World War II under the name Schutzhaus Ahornberg (Note: The Germans changed the historic German name of the peak from Javorový vrch to Ahornberg.)) is very popular, especially in winter (there is also a ski resort nearby).

The mountain hut on Skałka, used by the Czech Tourists Club, although it burned down twice after the war, looks like it did on its opening in the 1920s – it was always thoroughly rebuilt. Hadaszczok-Hütte no longer exists – it burned down during World War II (it is known that it still hosted tourists in 1942), or, according to other sources, the building was dismantled only in 1949 due to significant damage and attack by wood pests. Only the foundations remain, located near the still-operating Kolářova chata Slavíč hut. On the other hand, the mountain hut on Czantoria Wielka, now in private hands, after the opening of the border crossing and especially after Poland joined the Schengen Area, became a very popular destination for trips from the Polish side, although only a buffet operates there (without accommodation).

Most of the members and activists of Beskidenverein fled to Germany before the advancing Red Army and often joined associations of compatriots, while those who were active in German parties before the war also joined the Federation of Expellees. In Poland, however, Stonawski managed to stay. Although the authorities of the People's Republic of Poland brought him to trial, they did not prove a direct connection to fascist activities or harm to Poles. Immediately after the war, he wrote a letter to the Polish Tatra Association, asking to be buried near the mountain hut on Hala Lipowska, facing Pilska and Babia Góra, but the Polish Tatra Association Central Board replied that they would not deal with this matter. Dr. Stonawski lived in Bielsko, engaging in charitable activities for German residents and glorifying the former activities of the Beskidenverein. He died in 1966 in a mountain accident and was buried in the family tomb in Skoczów.

In West Germany, the memory of Beskidenverein remained vivid for many years after its dissolution – commemorative albums and books were published long after its existence.

== Bibliography ==
- Dziedzic, Marcin (2006). Morawsko-Śląskie Sudeckie Towarzystwo Górskie 1881-1945. Wrocław: Wrocławskie Towarzystwo Naukowe. ISBN 83-7374-041-4. OCLC 76339523.
- Gąstoł, J. (1977). "Wierchy". Beskidenverein a turystyka polska (cz. I). Warsaw – Kraków.
- Gąstoł, J. (1978). "Wierchy". Beskidenverein a turystyka polska (cz. II). Warsaw – Kraków. ISBN 83-01-02133-0.
- Jurek, T. (2002). Kultura fizyczna mniejszości niemieckiej w Polsce w latach 1918–1939. Gorzów Wielkopolski-Poznań. ISBN 83-906638-3-X.
- Kulczycki, Z. (1968). Zarys historii turystyki w Polsce. Warsaw: Sport i Turystyka.
- Mianowski, T. (1987). Schroniska górskie w Karpatach Polskich w latach 1939–1945. Warsaw – Kraków: Wydawnictwo PTTK "Kraj". ISBN 83-7005-142-1.
- Orłowicz, M. (2005). Kwieciński, Karol (ed.). Ilustrowany przewodnik po Galicyi, Bukowinie, Spiszu, Orawie i Śląsku Cieszyńskim: z mapą Galicyi i Tatr, planem Lwowa, Krakowa i 262 ilustracyami [An illustrated guide to Galicia, Bukovina, Spiš, Orava and Cieszyn Silesia: with a map of Galicia and the Tatra Mountains, a plan of Lviv, Krakow and 262 illustrations] (in Polish). Krosno: Wydawnictwo "Ruthenus". ISBN 83-86588-76-4. OCLC 1413097553.
  - Orłowicz, M. (1919). Kwieciński, Karol (ed.). Ilustrowany przewodnik po Galicyi, Bukowinie, Spiszu, Orawie i Śląsku Cieszyńskim [An illustrated guide to Galicia, Bukovina, Spiš, Orava and Cieszyn Silesia] (in Polish). Lviv: Książnica Polska. OCLC 1061137789.
- Stasiak, Andrzej; Śledzińska, Jolanta; Włodarczyk, Bogdan, eds. (2014). Szlaki turystyczne od pomysłu do realizacji (PDF) (Report). Warsaw – Łódź: Wydawnictwo PTTK "Kraj". ISBN 978-83-7005-562-2.
- Szczurek, K. (1998). "Josef Matzura". In Golec, J.; Bojda, S. (eds.). Słownik biograficzny ziemi cieszyńskiej. Vol. 3. Cieszyn: Spółka Polograficzno-Wydawnicza OFFSETdruk.
- Wiecheć, A. (2005). "Rozwój turystyki i eksploracji na Babiej Górze do 1918 r.". In Nowakowski, A.; Zaborniak, S. (eds.). Szkice z dziejów turystyki w Polsce. Studia i szkice z historii kultury fizycznej nr 3. Rzeszów: Podkarpackie Towarzystwo Naukowe Kultury Fizycznej. ISBN 83-89721-08-2.
