= Poliakovce =

- Municipality
- Flag

- Location of Poliakovce in the Prešov Region Location of Poliakovce in Slovakia
- Coordinates: 49.25°N 21.42°E
- Country: Slovakia
- Region: Prešov Region
- District: Bardejov District
- First mentioned: 1414

Area
  - Total: 7.53 km^{2} (2.91 sq mi)
- Elevation: 225 m (738 ft)

Population (2025)
  - Total: 365
- Time zone: UTC+1 (CET)
  - Summer (DST): UTC+2 (CEST)
- Postal code: 861 1
- Area code: +421 54
- Vehicle registration plate (until 2022): BJ
- Website: www.poliakovce.sk

Poliakovce is a village and municipality in Bardejov District in the Prešov Region of north-east Slovakia.

== History ==
In historical records the village was first mentioned in 1414.

== Geography ==
The municipality lies at an altitude of 225 metres (738 ft) and covers an area of 7.53 km^{2} (2.91 sq mi) (2025).

== Population ==
Population statistic (10 years)
Year	1995	2005	2015	2025
Count	394	371	362	365
Difference		−5.83%	−2.42%	+0.82%

Population statistic
Year	2024	2025
Count	378	365
Difference		−3.43%

It has a population of 365 people (31 December 2025).

=== Ethnicity ===
Census 2021 (1+ %)
Ethnicity	Number	Fraction
Slovak	365	96.3%
Not found out	13	3.43%
Rusyn	4	1.05%
Total	379	

In year 2021 was 379 people by ethnicity 365 as Slovak, 13 as Not found out, 4 as Rusyn, 1 as Ukrainian and 1 as Other.

Note on population: The difference values of population numbers in the table "Population statistic" and in the sections "Ethnicity" & "Religion" is caused by the use of various statistical methods.

=== Religion ===
Census 2021 (1+ %)
Religion	Number	Fraction
Roman Catholic Church	324	85.49%
Greek Catholic Church	23	6.07%
Not found out	12	3.17%
None	10	2.64%
Jehovah's Witnesses	4	1.06%
Total	379	

In year 2021 was 379 people by religion 324 from Roman Catholic Church, 23 from Greek Catholic Church, 12 from Not found out, 10 from None, 4 from Jehovah's Witnesses, 3 from Eastern Orthodox Church, 1 from Other and not ascertained christian church, 1 from Evangelical Church and 1 from Buddhism.
