= Harhaj =

- Municipality
- Flag

- Location of Harhaj in the Prešov Region Location of Harhaj in Slovakia
- Coordinates: 49.18°N 21.42°E
- Country: Slovakia
- Region: Prešov Region
- District: Bardejov District
- First mentioned: 1426

Area
  - Total: 4.42 km^{2} (1.71 sq mi)
- Elevation: 212 m (696 ft)

Population (2025)
  - Total: 255
- Time zone: UTC+1 (CET)
  - Summer (DST): UTC+2 (CEST)
- Postal code: 864 5
- Area code: +421 54
- Vehicle registration plate (until 2022): BJ
- Website: www.obec-harhaj.sk

Harhaj (Hungarian: Herhely) is a village and municipality in Bardejov District in the Prešov Region of north-east Slovakia.

== History ==
In historical records the village was first mentioned in 1426. Before the establishment of independent Czechoslovakia in 1918, Harhaj was part of Sáros County within the Kingdom of Hungary. From 1939 to 1945, it was part of the Slovak Republic. On 19 January 1945, the Red Army dislodged the Wehrmacht from Harhaj and it was once again part of Czechoslovakia.

== Geography ==
The municipality lies at an altitude of 212 metres (696 ft) and covers an area of 4.42 km^{2} (1.71 sq mi) (2025).

== Population ==
Population statistic (10 years)
| Year | 1995 | 2005 | 2015 | 2025 |
|---|---|---|---|---|
| Count | 232 | 257 | 266 | 255 |
| Difference | | +10.77% | +3.50% | −4.13% |

Population statistic
| Year | 2024 | 2025 |
|---|---|---|
| Count | 257 | 255 |
| Difference | | −0.77% |

It has a population of 255 people (31 December 2025).

=== Ethnicity ===
Census 2021 (1+ %)
| Ethnicity | Number | Fraction |
|---|---|---|
| Slovak | 257 | 97.34% |
| Not found out | 5 | 1.89% |
| Czech | 3 | 1.13% |
| Total | 264 | |

In year 2021 was 264 people by ethnicity 257 as Slovak, 5 as Not found out, 3 as Czech, 2 as Rusyn, 2 as Hungarian and 1 as English.

Note on population: The difference values of population numbers in the table "Population statistic" and in the sections "Ethnicity" & "Religion" is caused by the use of various statistical methods.

=== Religion ===
Census 2021 (1+ %)
| Religion | Number | Fraction |
|---|---|---|
| Roman Catholic Church | 218 | 82.58% |
| Evangelical Church | 33 | 12.5% |
| None | 8 | 3.03% |
| Total | 264 | |

In year 2021 was 264 people by religion 218 from Roman Catholic Church, 33 from Evangelical Church, 8 from None, 2 from Not found out, 2 from Greek Catholic Church and 1 from Calvinist Church.

== Genealogical resources ==
The records for genealogical research are available at the state archive "Statny Archiv in Presov, Slovakia"

- Roman Catholic church records (births/marriages/deaths): 1788-1895 (parish B)
- Greek Catholic church records (births/marriages/deaths): 1817-1939 (parish B)

== See also ==
- List of municipalities and towns in Slovakia
