= Hrabovec =

Village in Prešov Region, Slovakia

- Municipality
- Flag

- Location of Hrabovec in the Prešov Region Location of Hrabovec in Slovakia
- Coordinates: 49.27°N 21.38°E
- Country: Slovakia
- Region: Prešov Region
- District: Bardejov District
- First mentioned: 1338

Area
  - Total: 7.76 km^{2} (3.00 sq mi)
- Elevation: 243 m (797 ft)

Population (2025)
  - Total: 494
- Time zone: UTC+1 (CET)
  - Summer (DST): UTC+2 (CEST)
- Postal code: 861 1
- Area code: +421 54
- Vehicle registration plate (until 2022): BJ
- Website: www.obechrabovec.sk

Hrabovec (Hungarian: Rabóc) is a village and municipality in the Bardejov District, Prešov Region of north-east Slovakia.

== Geography ==
The municipality lies at an altitude of 243 metres (797 ft) and covers an area of 7.76 km^{2} (3.00 sq mi) (2025).

== Population ==
Population statistic (10 years)
Year	1995	2005	2015	2025
Count	465	509	525	494
Difference		+9.46%	+3.14%	−5.90%

Population statistic
Year	2024	2025
Count	496	494
Difference		−0.40%

It has a population of 494 people (31 December 2025).

=== Ethnicity ===
Census 2021 (1+ %)
Ethnicity	Number	Fraction
Slovak	490	96.07%
Rusyn	11	2.15%
Not found out	9	1.76%
Total	510	

In year 2021 was 510 people by ethnicity 490 as Slovak, 11 as Rusyn, 9 as Not found out, 3 as Czech, 3 as Other, 2 as English and 1 as Ukrainian.

Note on population: The difference values of population numbers in the table "Population statistic" and in the sections "Ethnicity" & "Religion" is caused by the use of various statistical methods.

=== Religion ===
Census 2021 (1+ %)
Religion	Number	Fraction
Roman Catholic Church	457	89.61%
Greek Catholic Church	24	4.71%
None	17	3.33%
Not found out	7	1.37%
Total	510	

In year 2021 was 510 people by religion 457 from Roman Catholic Church, 24 from Greek Catholic Church, 17 from None, 7 from Not found out, 2 from Eastern Orthodox Church, 2 from Evangelical Church and 1 from Other and not ascertained christian church.

== Genealogical resources ==
The records for genealogical research are available at the state archive "Statny Archiv in Presov, Slovakia"

- Roman Catholic church records (births/marriages/deaths): 1789-1897 (parish B)
- Greek Catholic church records (births/marriages/deaths): 1753-1906 (parish A)

== See also ==
- List of municipalities and towns in Slovakia
