= Nemcovce, Bardejov District =

Nemcovce
- Municipality
- Flag

- Location of Nemcovce in the Prešov Region Location of Nemcovce in Slovakia
- Coordinates: 49.21°N 21.44°E
- Country: Slovakia
- Region: Prešov Region
- District: Bardejov District
- First mentioned: 1427

Area
  - Total: 5.45 km^{2} (2.10 sq mi)
- Elevation: 207 m (679 ft)

Population (2025)
  - Total: 254
- Time zone: UTC+1 (CET)
  - Summer (DST): UTC+2 (CEST)
- Postal code: 861 2
- Area code: +421 54
- Vehicle registration plate (until 2022): BJ
- Website: www.nemcovce.sk

Nemcovce is a village and municipality in Bardejov District in the Prešov Region of north-east Slovakia.

== History ==
In historical records the village was first mentioned in 1427

== Geography ==
The municipality lies at an altitude of 207 metres (679 ft) and covers an area of 5.45 km^{2} (2.10 sq mi) (2025).

== Population ==
Population statistic (10 years)
Year	1995	2005	2015	2025
Count	264	257	252	254
Difference		−2.65%	−1.94%	+0.79%

Population statistic
Year	2024	2025
Count	252	254
Difference		+0.79%

It has a population of 254 people (31 December 2025).

=== Ethnicity ===
Census 2021 (1+ %)
Ethnicity	Number	Fraction
Slovak	260	99.61%
Rusyn	4	1.53%
Total	261	

In year 2021 was 261 people by ethnicity 260 as Slovak, 4 as Rusyn and 1 as Not found out.

Note on population: The difference values of population numbers in the table "Population statistic" and in the sections "Ethnicity" & "Religion" is caused by the use of various statistical methods.

=== Religion ===
Census 2021 (1+ %)
Religion	Number	Fraction
Roman Catholic Church	204	78.16%
Evangelical Church	47	18.01%
None	5	1.92%
Greek Catholic Church	3	1.15%
Total	261	

In year 2021 was 261 people by religion 204 from Roman Catholic Church, 47 from Evangelical Church, 5 from None, 3 from Greek Catholic Church, 1 from Eastern Orthodox Church and 1 from Not found out.
