= Osikov =

- Municipality
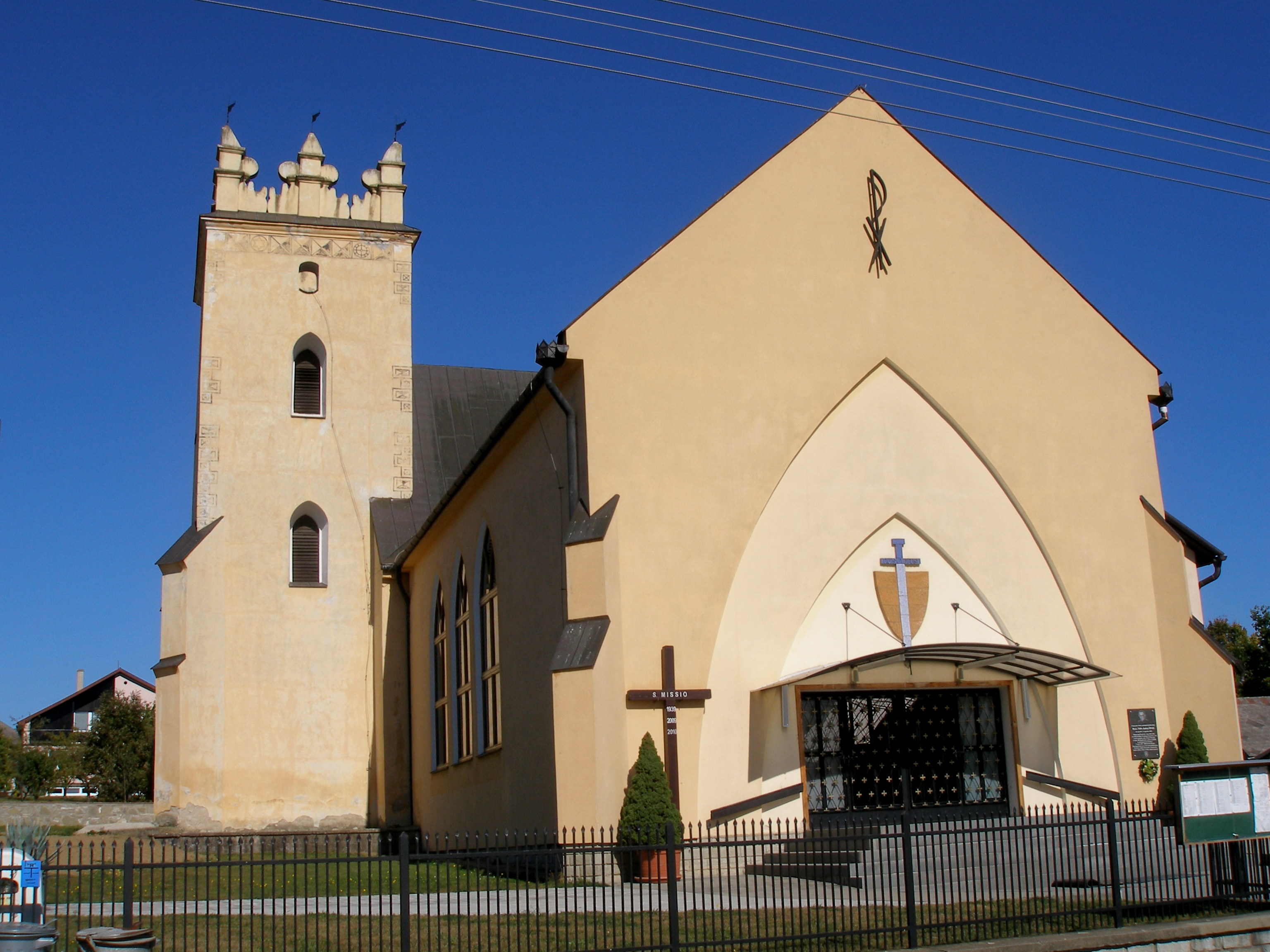

- Flag

- Location of Osikov in the Prešov Region Location of Osikov in Slovakia
- Coordinates: 49.17°N 21.27°E
- Country: Slovakia
- Region: Prešov Region
- District: Bardejov District
- First mentioned: 1372

Area
  - Total: 13.87 km^{2} (5.36 sq mi)
- Elevation: 367 m (1,204 ft)

Population (2025)
  - Total: 1,033
- Time zone: UTC+1 (CET)
  - Summer (DST): UTC+2 (CEST)
- Postal code: 864 2
- Area code: +421 54
- Vehicle registration plate (until 2022): BJ
- Website: www.obecosikov.sk

Osikov is a village and municipality in Bardejov District in the Prešov Region of north-east Slovakia.

== History ==
In historical records the village was first mentioned in 1372.

== Geography ==
The municipality lies at an altitude of 367 metres (1,204 ft) and covers an area of 13.87 km^{2} (5.36 sq mi) (2025).

== Population ==
Population statistic (10 years)
Year	1995	2005	2015	2025
Count	865	934	995	1033
Difference		+7.97%	+6.53%	+3.81%

Population statistic
Year	2024	2025
Count	1028	1033
Difference		+0.48%

It has a population of 1033 people (31 December 2025).

=== Ethnicity ===
Census 2021 (1+ %)
Ethnicity	Number	Fraction
Slovak	986	99.69%
Total	989	

In year 2021 was 989 people by ethnicity 986 as Slovak, 6 as Other, 5 as Rusyn, 4 as Not found out, 2 as German, 1 as Czech and 1 as Russian.

Note on population: The difference values of population numbers in the table "Population statistic" and in the sections "Ethnicity" & "Religion" is caused by the use of various statistical methods.

=== Religion ===
Census 2021 (1+ %)
Religion	Number	Fraction
Roman Catholic Church	943	95.35%
None	20	2.02%
Greek Catholic Church	13	1.31%
Total	989	

In year 2021 was 989 people by religion 943 from Roman Catholic Church, 20 from None, 13 from Greek Catholic Church, 6 from Evangelical Church, 4 from Christian Congregations in Slovakia, 2 from Ad hoc movements and 1 from Buddhism.
