= Ortuťová =

- Municipality
- Flag

- Location of Ortuťová in the Prešov Region Location of Ortuťová in Slovakia
- Coordinates: 49.30°N 21.45°E
- Country: Slovakia
- Region: Prešov Region
- District: Bardejov District
- First mentioned: 1414

Area
  - Total: 6.02 km^{2} (2.32 sq mi)
- Elevation: 231 m (758 ft)

Population (2025)
  - Total: 222
- Time zone: UTC+1 (CET)
  - Summer (DST): UTC+2 (CEST)
- Postal code: 861 3
- Area code: +421 54
- Vehicle registration plate (until 2022): BJ
- Website: www.ortutova.sk

Ortuťová (Rusyn: Ортутова) is a village and municipality in Bardejov District in the Prešov Region of north-east Slovakia.

== History ==
In historical records the village was first mentioned in 1414

== Geography ==
The municipality lies at an altitude of 231 metres (758 ft) and covers an area of 6.02 km^{2} (2.32 sq mi) (2025).

== Population ==
Population statistic (10 years)
Year	1995	2005	2015	2025
Count	203	189	174	222
Difference		−6.89%	−7.93%	+27.58%

Population statistic
Year	2024	2025
Count	216	222
Difference		+2.77%

It has a population of 222 people (31 December 2025).

=== Ethnicity ===
Census 2021 (1+ %)
Ethnicity	Number	Fraction
Slovak	171	89.06%
Rusyn	81	42.18%
Romani	7	3.64%
Hungarian	4	2.08%
Not found out	2	1.04%
Total	192	

In year 2021 was 192 people by ethnicity 171 as Slovak, 81 as Rusyn, 7 as Romani, 4 as Hungarian, 2 as Not found out, 1 as Czech, 1 as Ukrainian and 1 as Romanian.

Note on population: The difference values of population numbers in the table "Population statistic" and in the sections "Ethnicity" & "Religion" is caused by the use of various statistical methods.

=== Religion ===
Census 2021 (1+ %)
Religion	Number	Fraction
Greek Catholic Church	144	75%
None	24	12.5%
Roman Catholic Church	14	7.29%
Eastern Orthodox Church	5	2.6%
Evangelical Church	4	2.08%
Total	192	

In year 2021 was 192 people by religion 144 from Greek Catholic Church, 24 from None, 14 from Roman Catholic Church, 5 from Eastern Orthodox Church, 4 from Evangelical Church and 1 from Not found out.
