= Livov =

- Municipality
- Flag

- Location of Livov in the Prešov Region Location of Livov in Slovakia
- Coordinates: 49.25°N 21.09°E
- Country: Slovakia
- Region: Prešov Region
- District: Bardejov District
- First mentioned: 1600

Area
  - Total: 26.39 km^{2} (10.19 sq mi)
- Elevation: 515 m (1,690 ft)

Population (2025)
  - Total: 73
- Time zone: UTC+1 (CET)
  - Summer (DST): UTC+2 (CEST)
- Postal code: 860 5
- Area code: +421 54
- Vehicle registration plate (until 2022): BJ

Livov is a village and municipality in Bardejov District in the Prešov Region of north-east Slovakia.

== History ==
In historical records the village was first mentioned in 1600

== Geography ==
The municipality lies at an altitude of 515 metres (1,690 ft) and covers an area of 26.39 km^{2} (10.19 sq mi) (2025).

== Population ==
Population statistic (10 years)
Year	1995	2005	2015	2025
Count	104	99	82	73
Difference		−4.80%	−17.17%	−10.97%

Population statistic
Year	2024	2025
Count	69	73
Difference		+5.79%

It has a population of 73 people (31 December 2025).

=== Ethnicity ===
Census 2021 (1+ %)
Ethnicity	Number	Fraction
Slovak	58	93.54%
Rusyn	10	16.12%
Russian	2	3.22%
Not found out	2	3.22%
Total	62	

In year 2021 was 62 people by ethnicity 58 as Slovak, 10 as Rusyn, 2 as Russian and 2 as Not found out.

Note on population: The difference values of population numbers in the table "Population statistic" and in the sections "Ethnicity" & "Religion" is caused by the use of various statistical methods.

=== Religion ===
Census 2021 (1+ %)
Religion	Number	Fraction
Greek Catholic Church	38	61.29%
Roman Catholic Church	11	17.74%
Eastern Orthodox Church	7	11.29%
None	4	6.45%
Calvinist Church	1	1.61%
Not found out	1	1.61%
Total	62	

In year 2021 was 62 people by religion 38 from Greek Catholic Church, 11 from Roman Catholic Church, 7 from Eastern Orthodox Church, 4 from None, 1 from Calvinist Church and 1 from Not found out.

== Gallery ==
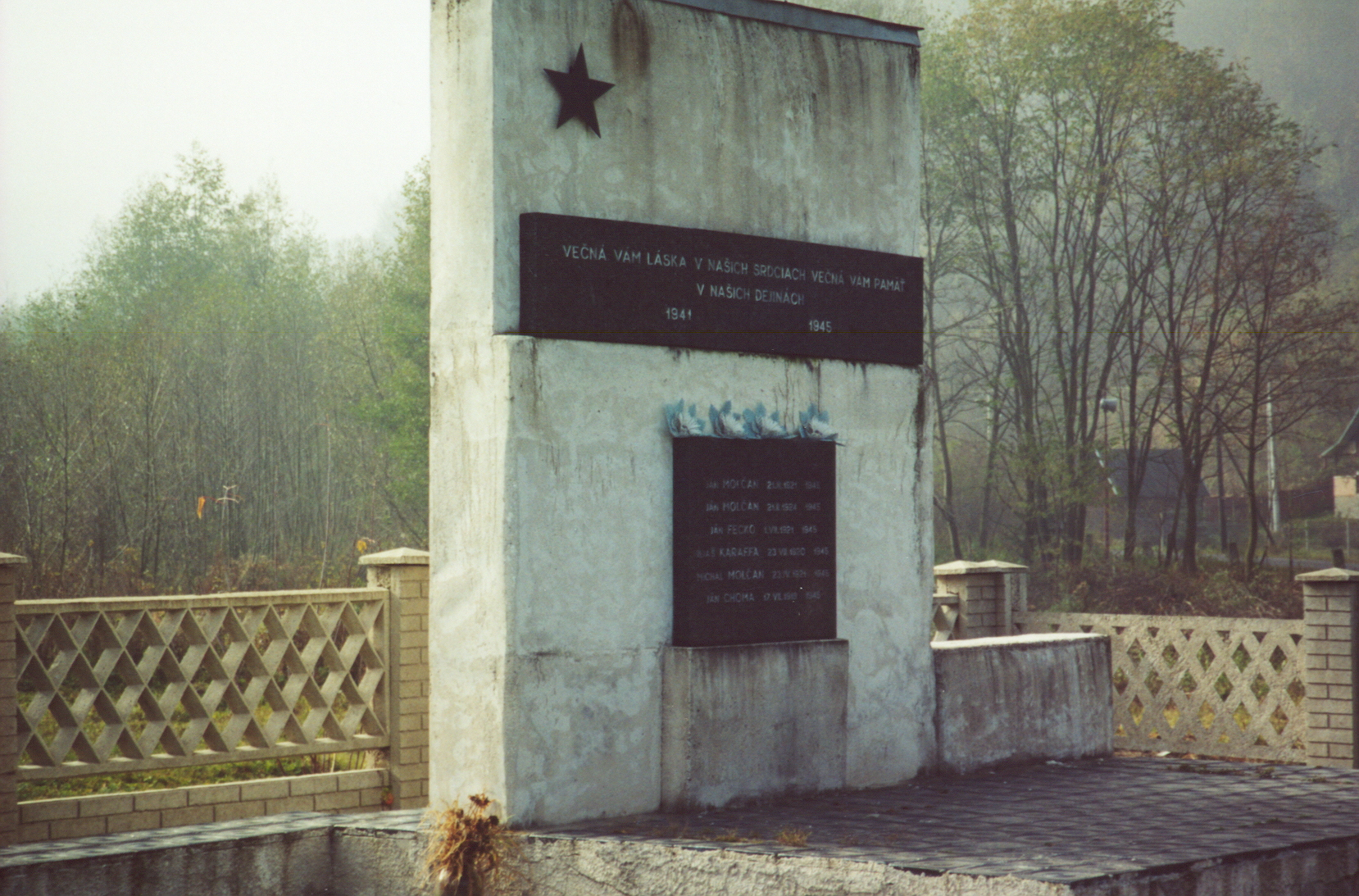
World War II Partisan Monument in Livov, Slovakia
