= Chmeľová =

- Municipality
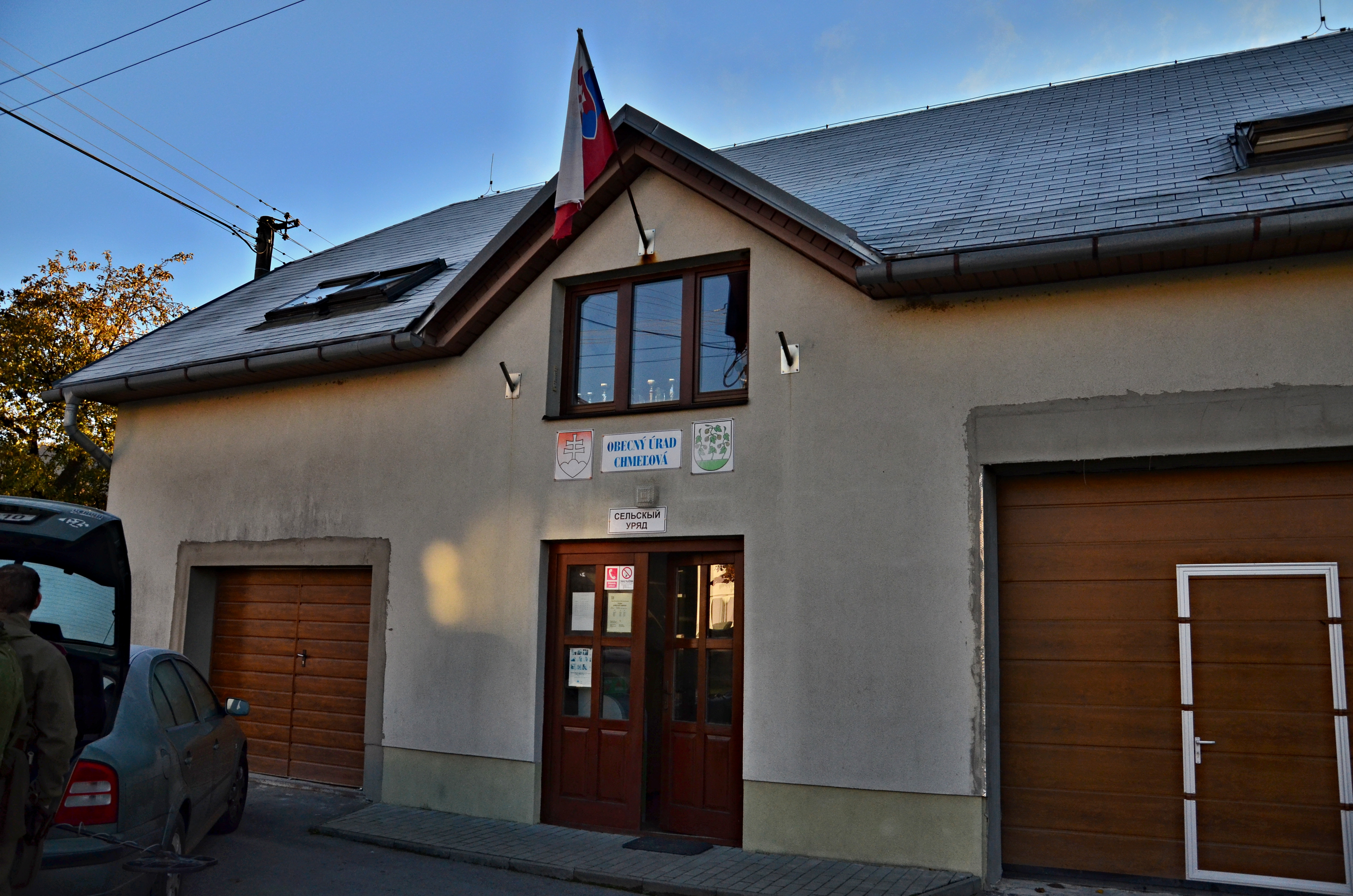

- Flag

- Location of Chmeľová in the Prešov Region Location of Chmeľová in Slovakia
- Coordinates: 49.40°N 21.30°E
- Country: Slovakia
- Region: Prešov Region
- District: Bardejov District
- First mentioned: 1414

Area
  - Total: 12.43 km^{2} (4.80 sq mi)
- Elevation: 363 m (1,191 ft)

Population (2025)
  - Total: 366
- Time zone: UTC+1 (CET)
  - Summer (DST): UTC+2 (CEST)
- Postal code: 863 5
- Area code: +421 54
- Vehicle registration plate (until 2022): BJ
- Website: www.chmelova.sk

Chmeľová (Rusyn: Хмелёва) is a village and small municipality in Bardejov District in the Prešov Region of north-east Slovakia, formerly known as Komloša.

== History ==
In historical records the village was first mentioned in 1414.

== Geography ==
The municipality lies at an altitude of 363 metres (1,191 ft) and covers an area of 12.43 km^{2} (4.80 sq mi) (2025).

== Population ==
Population statistic (10 years)
Year	1995	2005	2015	2025
Count	376	400	380	366
Difference		+6.38%	−5%	−3.68%

Population statistic
Year	2024	2025
Count	364	366
Difference		+0.54%

It has a population of 366 people (31 December 2025).

=== Ethnicity ===
Census 2021 (1+ %)
Ethnicity	Number	Fraction
Slovak	259	70.18%
Rusyn	209	56.63%
Ukrainian	17	4.6%
Not found out	5	1.35%
Total	369	

In year 2021 was 369 people by ethnicity 259 as Slovak, 209 as Rusyn, 17 as Ukrainian, 5 as Not found out, 1 as Czech, 1 as German and 1 as Hungarian.

Note on population: The difference values of population numbers in the table "Population statistic" and in the sections "Ethnicity" & "Religion" is caused by the use of various statistical methods.

=== Religion ===
Census 2021 (1+ %)
Religion	Number	Fraction
Greek Catholic Church	272	73.71%
Roman Catholic Church	48	13.01%
None	25	6.78%
Eastern Orthodox Church	14	3.79%
Not found out	5	1.36%
Total	369	

In year 2021 was 369 people by religion 272 from Greek Catholic Church, 48 from Roman Catholic Church, 25 from None, 14 from Eastern Orthodox Church, 5 from Not found out, 3 from Evangelical Church, 1 from Other and 1 from Church of the Brethren.

== Genealogical resources ==
The records for genealogical research are available at the state archive "Statny Archiv in Presov, Slovakia"

- Roman Catholic church records (births/marriages/deaths): 1695-1895 (parish B)
- Greek Catholic church records (births/marriages/deaths): 1758-1908 (parish A)

== See also ==
- List of municipalities and towns in Slovakia
