= Buclovany =

- Municipality
- Flag

- Location of Buclovany in the Prešov Region Location of Buclovany in Slovakia
- Coordinates: 49.15°N 21.37°E
- Country: Slovakia
- Region: Prešov Region
- District: Bardejov District
- First mentioned: 1345

Area
  - Total: 4.09 km^{2} (1.58 sq mi)
- Elevation: 238 m (781 ft)

Population (2025)
  - Total: 206
- Time zone: UTC+1 (CET)
  - Summer (DST): UTC+2 (CEST)
- Postal code: 864 3
- Area code: +421 54
- Vehicle registration plate (until 2022): BJ
- Website: www.buclovany.sk

Buclovany (Hungarian: Bucló) is a village and municipality in Bardejov District in the Prešov Region of north-east Slovakia.

== History ==
In historical records, the village was first mentioned in 1345.

== Geography ==
The municipality lies at an altitude of 238 metres (781 ft) and covers an area of 4.09 km^{2} (1.58 sq mi) (2025).

== Population ==
Population statistic (10 years)
Year	1995	2005	2015	2025
Count	245	225	207	206
Difference		−8.16%	−8%	−0.48%

Population statistic
Year	2024	2025
Count	199	206
Difference		+3.51%

It has a population of 206 people (31 December 2025).

=== Ethnicity ===
Census 2021 (1+ %)
Ethnicity	Number	Fraction
Slovak	203	98.06%
Not found out	4	1.93%
Total	207	

In year 2021 was 207 people by ethnicity 203 as Slovak, 4 as Not found out and 1 as Czech.

Note on population: The difference values of population numbers in the table "Population statistic" and in the sections "Ethnicity" & "Religion" is caused by the use of various statistical methods.

=== Religion ===
Census 2021 (1+ %)
Religion	Number	Fraction
Evangelical Church	172	83.09%
None	15	7.25%
Roman Catholic Church	14	6.76%
Not found out	3	1.45%
Total	207	

In year 2021 was 207 people by religion 172 from Evangelical Church, 15 from None, 14 from Roman Catholic Church, 3 from Not found out, 2 from Greek Catholic Church and 1 from Paganism and natural spirituality.

== See also ==
- List of municipalities and towns in Slovakia
