= Vyšná Voľa =

- Municipality
- Flag

- Location of Vyšná Voľa in the Prešov Region Location of Vyšná Voľa in Slovakia
- Coordinates: 49.25°N 21.37°E
- Country: Slovakia
- Region: Prešov Region
- District: Bardejov District
- First mentioned: 1310

Area
  - Total: 8.83 km^{2} (3.41 sq mi)
- Elevation: 325 m (1,066 ft)

Population (2025)
  - Total: 398
- Time zone: UTC+1 (CET)
  - Summer (DST): UTC+2 (CEST)
- Postal code: 862 1
- Area code: +421 54
- Vehicle registration plate (until 2022): BJ
- Website: vysnavola.sk

Vyšná Voľa is a village and municipality in Bardejov District in the Prešov Region of north-east Slovakia.

== History ==
In historical records the village was first mentioned in 1310

== Geography ==
The municipality lies at an altitude of 325 metres (1,066 ft) and covers an area of 8.83 km^{2} (3.41 sq mi) (2025).

== Population ==
Population statistic (10 years)
Year	1995	2005	2015	2025
Count	385	401	401	398
Difference		+4.15%	+0%	−0.74%

Population statistic
Year	2024	2025
Count	402	398
Difference		−0.99%

It has a population of 398 people (31 December 2025).

=== Ethnicity ===
Census 2021 (1+ %)
Ethnicity	Number	Fraction
Slovak	392	99.74%
Total	393	

In year 2021 was 393 people by ethnicity 392 as Slovak, 3 as Rusyn, 1 as Czech and 1 as Romani.

Note on population: The difference values of population numbers in the table "Population statistic" and in the sections "Ethnicity" & "Religion" is caused by the use of various statistical methods.

=== Religion ===
Census 2021 (1+ %)
Religion	Number	Fraction
Evangelical Church	241	61.32%
Roman Catholic Church	117	29.77%
Greek Catholic Church	21	5.34%
None	10	2.54%
Total	393	

In year 2021 was 393 people by religion 241 from Evangelical Church, 117 from Roman Catholic Church, 21 from Greek Catholic Church, 10 from None, 3 from Christian Congregations in Slovakia and 1 from Eastern Orthodox Church.
