= Dubinné =

- Municipality
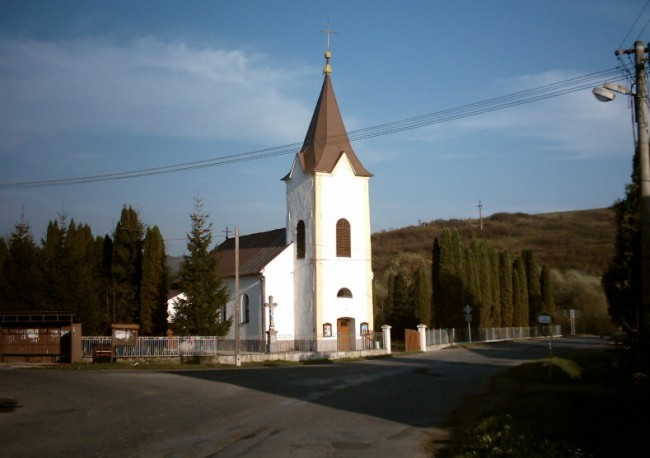

- Flag

- Location of Dubinné in the Prešov Region Location of Dubinné in Slovakia
- Coordinates: 49.25°N 21.45°E
- Country: Slovakia
- Region: Prešov Region
- District: Bardejov District
- First mentioned: 1327

Area
  - Total: 7.06 km^{2} (2.73 sq mi)
- Elevation: 219 m (719 ft)

Population (2025)
  - Total: 337
- Time zone: UTC+1 (CET)
  - Summer (DST): UTC+2 (CEST)
- Postal code: 861 2
- Area code: +421 54
- Vehicle registration plate (until 2022): BJ
- Website: www.dubinne.sk

Dubinné is a village and municipality in Bardejov District in the Prešov Region of north-east Slovakia.

== History ==
In historical records the village was first mentioned in 1327.

== Geography ==
The municipality lies at an altitude of 219 metres (719 ft) and covers an area of 7.06 km^{2} (2.73 sq mi) (2025).

== Population ==
Population statistic (10 years)
Year	1995	2005	2015	2025
Count	344	336	356	337
Difference		−2.32%	+5.95%	−5.33%

Population statistic
Year	2024	2025
Count	333	337
Difference		+1.20%

It has a population of 337 people (31 December 2025).

=== Ethnicity ===
Census 2021 (1+ %)
Ethnicity	Number	Fraction
Slovak	336	99.11%
Rusyn	6	1.76%
Total	339	

In year 2021 was 339 people by ethnicity 336 as Slovak, 6 as Rusyn, 3 as Not found out and 2 as Irish.

Note on population: The difference values of population numbers in the table "Population statistic" and in the sections "Ethnicity" & "Religion" is caused by the use of various statistical methods.

=== Religion ===
Census 2021 (1+ %)
Religion	Number	Fraction
Roman Catholic Church	300	88.5%
Greek Catholic Church	23	6.78%
None	8	2.36%
Eastern Orthodox Church	5	1.47%
Total	339	

In year 2021 was 339 people by religion 300 from Roman Catholic Church, 23 from Greek Catholic Church, 8 from None, 5 from Eastern Orthodox Church, 2 from Not found out and 1 from Evangelical Church.

== Genealogical resources ==
The records for genealogical research are available at the state archive "Statny Archiv in Presov, Slovakia"

- Roman Catholic church records (births/marriages/deaths): 1714-1895 (parish B)
- Greek Catholic church records (births/marriages/deaths): 1852-1924 (parish B)

== See also ==
- List of municipalities and towns in Slovakia
