= Komárov, Bardejov District =

Komárov
- Municipality
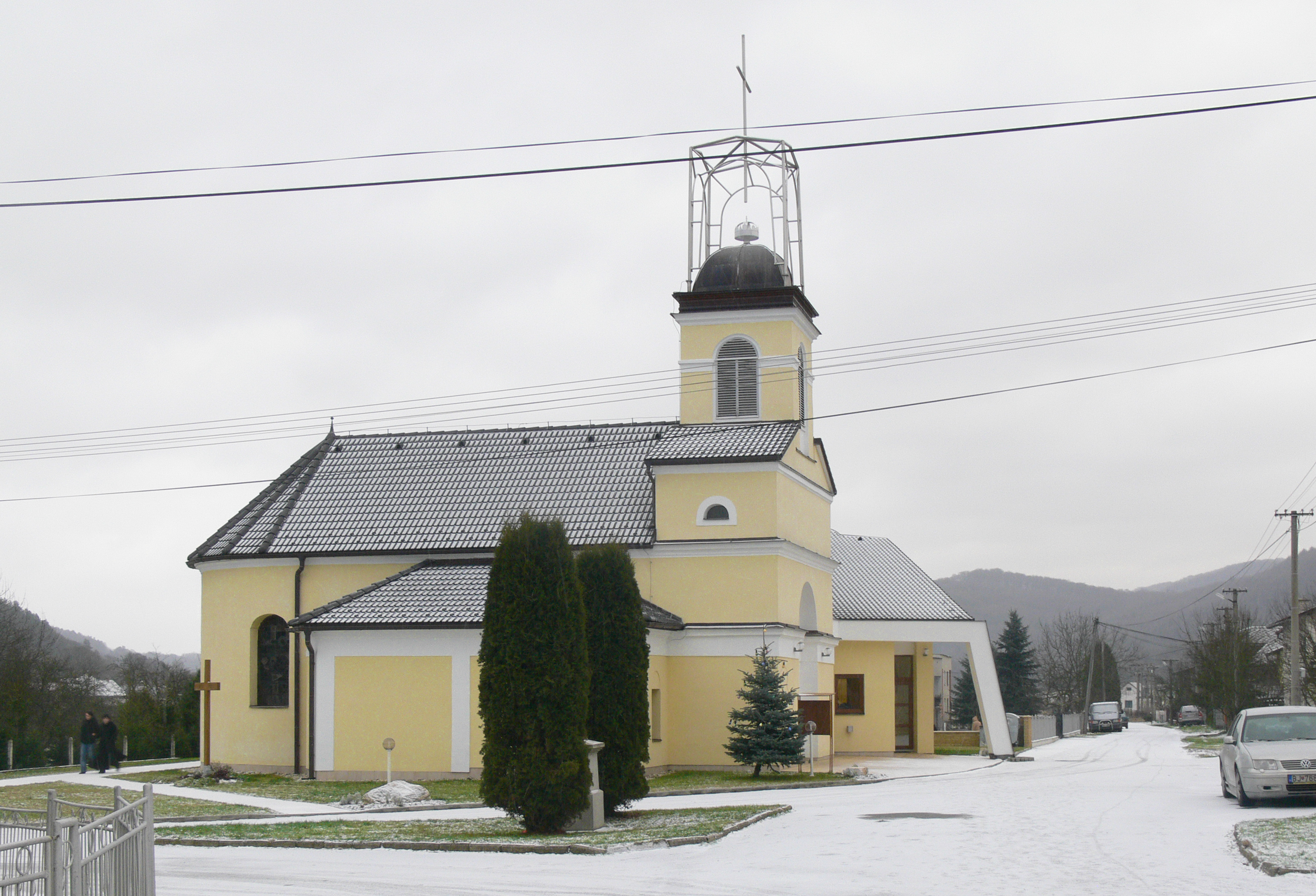

- Flag

- Location of Komárov in the Prešov Region Location of Komárov in Slovakia
- Coordinates: 49.28°N 21.35°E
- Country: Slovakia
- Region: Prešov Region
- District: Bardejov District
- First mentioned: 1355

Area
  - Total: 7.99 km^{2} (3.08 sq mi)
- Elevation: 244 m (801 ft)

Population (2025)
  - Total: 475
- Time zone: UTC+1 (CET)
  - Summer (DST): UTC+2 (CEST)
- Postal code: 861 1
- Area code: +421 54
- Vehicle registration plate (until 2022): BJ
- Website: www.obeckomarov.sk

Komárov (Hungarian since 1907: Felsőkomaróc) is a village and municipality in Bardejov, Prešov, Slovakia.

== History ==
In historical records, the village was first mentioned in 1355. Komárov has a Catholic Church (built circa 1490s), a soccer field, a small shop, a bar, a mortician, and the ruins of two castles. One of these has since been converted into a park with a tennis court and pool. There are three cemeteries, which have housed the earthly remains of citizens for hundreds of years.

In World War II, it was one of very few villages which never saw tanks, as the bridge was destroyed.

== Geography ==
The municipality lies at an altitude of 244 metres (801 ft) and covers an area of 7.99 km^{2} (3.08 sq mi) (2025). Komárov is somewhat unusual as a village, as it only has one way in or out via a bridge, and cannot be driven through.

Many immigrants from this town have settled in and around Bridgeport, Connecticut.

== Population ==
Population statistic (10 years)
Year	1995	2005	2015	2025
Count	399	406	445	475
Difference		+1.75%	+9.60%	+6.74%

Population statistic
Year	2024	2025
Count	473	475
Difference		+0.42%

It has a population of 475 people (31 December 2025).

=== Ethnicity ===
Census 2021 (1+ %)
Ethnicity	Number	Fraction
Slovak	446	98.02%
Not found out	10	2.19%
Total	455	

In year 2021 was 455 people by ethnicity 446 as Slovak, 10 as Not found out, 2 as Rusyn and 1 as Romani.

Note on population: The difference values of population numbers in the table "Population statistic" and in the sections "Ethnicity" & "Religion" is caused by the use of various statistical methods.

=== Religion ===
Census 2021 (1+ %)
Religion	Number	Fraction
Roman Catholic Church	415	91.21%
Greek Catholic Church	11	2.42%
None	10	2.2%
Not found out	9	1.98%
Evangelical Church	5	1.1%
Total	455	

In year 2021 was 455 people by religion 415 from Roman Catholic Church, 11 from Greek Catholic Church, 10 from None, 9 from Not found out, 5 from Evangelical Church, 3 from Jewish community, 1 from Eastern Orthodox Church and 1 from Buddhism.

== Economy ==
The village is mostly made up of farmers but there is a nearby forest where logging has been done. Besides cattle and chicken, most farms produce cucumbers, tomatoes, and other vegetables. There are a good number of fruit trees, with pears being the most common.

The town also has a fairly large population of storks, some of which nest on the chimneys of houses.

== Genealogical resources ==
The records for genealogical research are available at the state archive "Statny Archiv in Presov, Slovakia"

- Roman Catholic church records (births/marriages/deaths): 1789-1897 (parish B)
- Greek Catholic church records (births/marriages/deaths): 1753-1906 (parish B)

== See also ==
- List of municipalities and towns in Slovakia
