= Hankovce, Bardejov District =

Hankovce
- Municipality
- Flag

- Location of Hankovce in the Prešov Region Location of Hankovce in Slovakia
- Coordinates: 49.20°N 21.41°E
- Country: Slovakia
- Region: Prešov Region
- District: Bardejov District
- First mentioned: 1427

Area
  - Total: 8.89 km^{2} (3.43 sq mi)
- Elevation: 250 m (820 ft)

Population (2025)
  - Total: 436
- Time zone: UTC+1 (CET)
  - Summer (DST): UTC+2 (CEST)
- Postal code: 864 6
- Area code: +421 54
- Vehicle registration plate (until 2022): BJ
- Website: www.hankovce.sk

Hankovce is a village and municipality in Bardejov District in the Prešov Region of north-east Slovakia.

== History ==
In historical records the village was first mentioned in 1427.

== Geography ==
The municipality lies at an altitude of 250 metres (820 ft) and covers an area of 8.89 km^{2} (3.43 sq mi) (2025).

== Population ==
Population statistic (10 years)
Year	1995	2005	2015	2025
Count	414	405	410	436
Difference		−2.17%	+1.23%	+6.34%

Population statistic
Year	2024	2025
Count	437	436
Difference		−0.22%

It has a population of 436 people (31 December 2025).

=== Ethnicity ===
Census 2021 (1+ %)
Ethnicity	Number	Fraction
Slovak	447	99.11%
Not found out	5	1.1%
Total	451	

In year 2021 was 451 people by ethnicity 447 as Slovak, 5 as Not found out, 2 as Ukrainian, 2 as Rusyn, 1 as Czech and 1 as Polish.

Note on population: The difference values of population numbers in the table "Population statistic" and in the sections "Ethnicity" & "Religion" is caused by the use of various statistical methods.

=== Religion ===
Census 2021 (1+ %)
Religion	Number	Fraction
Evangelical Church	255	56.54%
Roman Catholic Church	170	37.69%
Greek Catholic Church	19	4.21%
Total	451	

In year 2021 was 451 people by religion 255 from Evangelical Church, 170 from Roman Catholic Church, 19 from Greek Catholic Church, 4 from None, 2 from Not found out and 1 from Church of the Brethren.
