= Nižná Voľa =

- Municipality
- Flag Coat of arms

- Location of Nižná Voľa in the Prešov Region Location of Nižná Voľa in Slovakia
- Coordinates: 49.22°N 21.37°E
- Country: Slovakia
- Region: Prešov Region
- District: Bardejov District
- First mentioned: 1310

Area
  - Total: 7.17 km^{2} (2.77 sq mi)
- Elevation: 267 m (876 ft)

Population (2025)
  - Total: 270
- Time zone: UTC+1 (CET)
  - Summer (DST): UTC+2 (CEST)
- Postal code: 862 1
- Area code: +421 54
- Vehicle registration plate (until 2022): BJ
- Website: www.niznavola.sk

Nižná Voľa (Ukrainian: Нижня Воля, Nyzhnia Volia) is a village and municipality in Bardejov District in the Prešov Region of north-east Slovakia. There is a church built in 1823-1826 which is being used by both religions (Greek and Roman Catholics).

== History ==
In historical records the village was first mentioned in 1310

== Geography ==
The municipality lies at an altitude of 267 metres (876 ft) and covers an area of 7.17 km^{2} (2.77 sq mi) (2025).

== Population ==
Population statistic (10 years)
Year	1995	2005	2015	2025
Count	271	287	291	270
Difference		+5.90%	+1.39%	−7.21%

Population statistic
Year	2024	2025
Count	269	270
Difference		+0.37%

It has a population of 270 people (31 December 2025).

=== Ethnicity ===
Census 2021 (1+ %)
Ethnicity	Number	Fraction
Slovak	264	96.35%
Not found out	8	2.91%
Rusyn	4	1.45%
Total	274	

In year 2021 was 274 people by ethnicity 264 as Slovak, 8 as Not found out, 4 as Rusyn, 1 as Polish and 1 as Other.

Note on population: The difference values of population numbers in the table "Population statistic" and in the sections "Ethnicity" & "Religion" is caused by the use of various statistical methods.

=== Religion ===
Census 2021 (1+ %)
Religion	Number	Fraction
Roman Catholic Church	187	68.25%
Evangelical Church	50	18.25%
Greek Catholic Church	21	7.66%
Not found out	7	2.55%
None	6	2.19%
Total	274	

In year 2021 was 274 people by religion 187 from Roman Catholic Church, 50 from Evangelical Church, 21 from Greek Catholic Church, 7 from Not found out, 6 from None, 2 from Eastern Orthodox Church and 1 from Church of the Brethren.
