= Mikulášová =

- Municipality
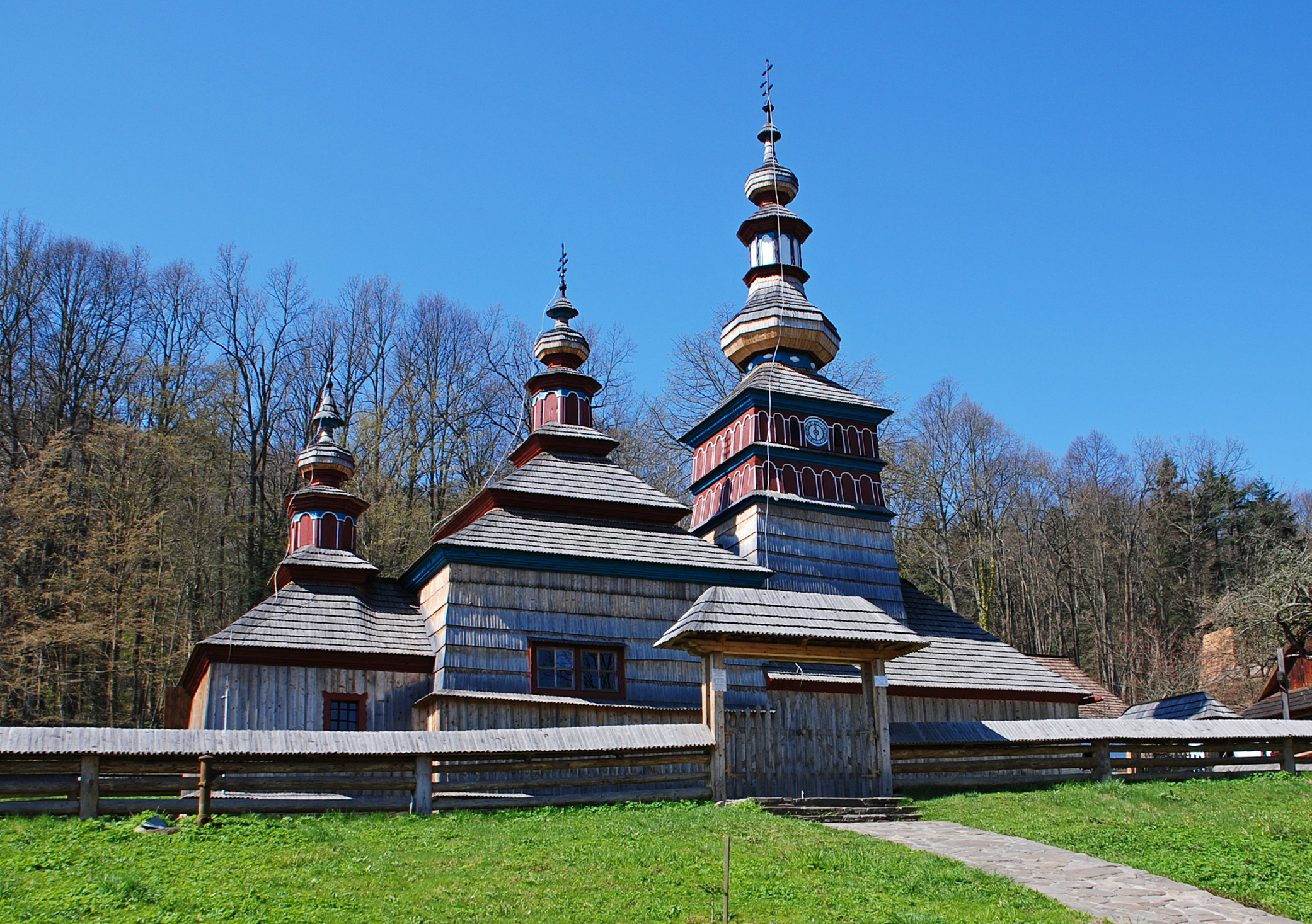

- Flag

- Location of Mikulášová in the Prešov Region Location of Mikulášová in Slovakia
- Coordinates: 49.38°N 21.39°E
- Country: Slovakia
- Region: Prešov Region
- District: Bardejov District
- First mentioned: 1414

Area
  - Total: 7.99 km^{2} (3.08 sq mi)
- Elevation: 345 m (1,132 ft)

Population (2025)
  - Total: 121
- Time zone: UTC+1 (CET)
  - Summer (DST): UTC+2 (CEST)
- Postal code: 863 6
- Area code: +421 54
- Vehicle registration plate (until 2022): BJ
- Website: obecmikulasova.sk

Mikulášová (Rusyn: Никлёва) is a village and municipality in Bardejov District in the Prešov Region of north-east Slovakia.

== History ==
The village was first mentioned in historical records in 1414.

== Geography ==
The municipality lies at an altitude of 345 metres (1,132 ft) and covers an area of 7.99 km^{2} (3.08 sq mi) (2025).

== Population ==
Population statistic (10 years)
Year	1995	2005	2015	2025
Count	167	142	126	121
Difference		−14.97%	−11.26%	−3.96%

Population statistic
Year	2024	2025
Count	124	121
Difference		−2.41%

It has a population of 121 people (31 December 2025).

=== Ethnicity ===
Census 2021 (1+ %)
Ethnicity	Number	Fraction
Slovak	92	75.4%
Rusyn	62	50.81%
Not found out	6	4.91%
Ukrainian	3	2.45%
Total	122	

In year 2021 was 122 people by ethnicity 92 as Slovak, 62 as Rusyn, 6 as Not found out, 3 as Ukrainian and 1 as German.

Note on population: The difference values of population numbers in the table "Population statistic" and in the sections "Ethnicity" & "Religion" is caused by the use of various statistical methods.

=== Religion ===
Census 2021 (1+ %)
Religion	Number	Fraction
Eastern Orthodox Church	55	45.08%
Greek Catholic Church	38	31.15%
Jehovah's Witnesses	17	13.93%
None	7	5.74%
Roman Catholic Church	2	1.64%
Not found out	2	1.64%
Total	122	

In year 2021 was 122 people by religion 55 from Eastern Orthodox Church, 38 from Greek Catholic Church, 17 from Jehovah's Witnesses, 7 from None, 2 from Roman Catholic Church, 2 from Not found out and 1 from Evangelical Church.
