= Vyšná Polianka =

- Municipality
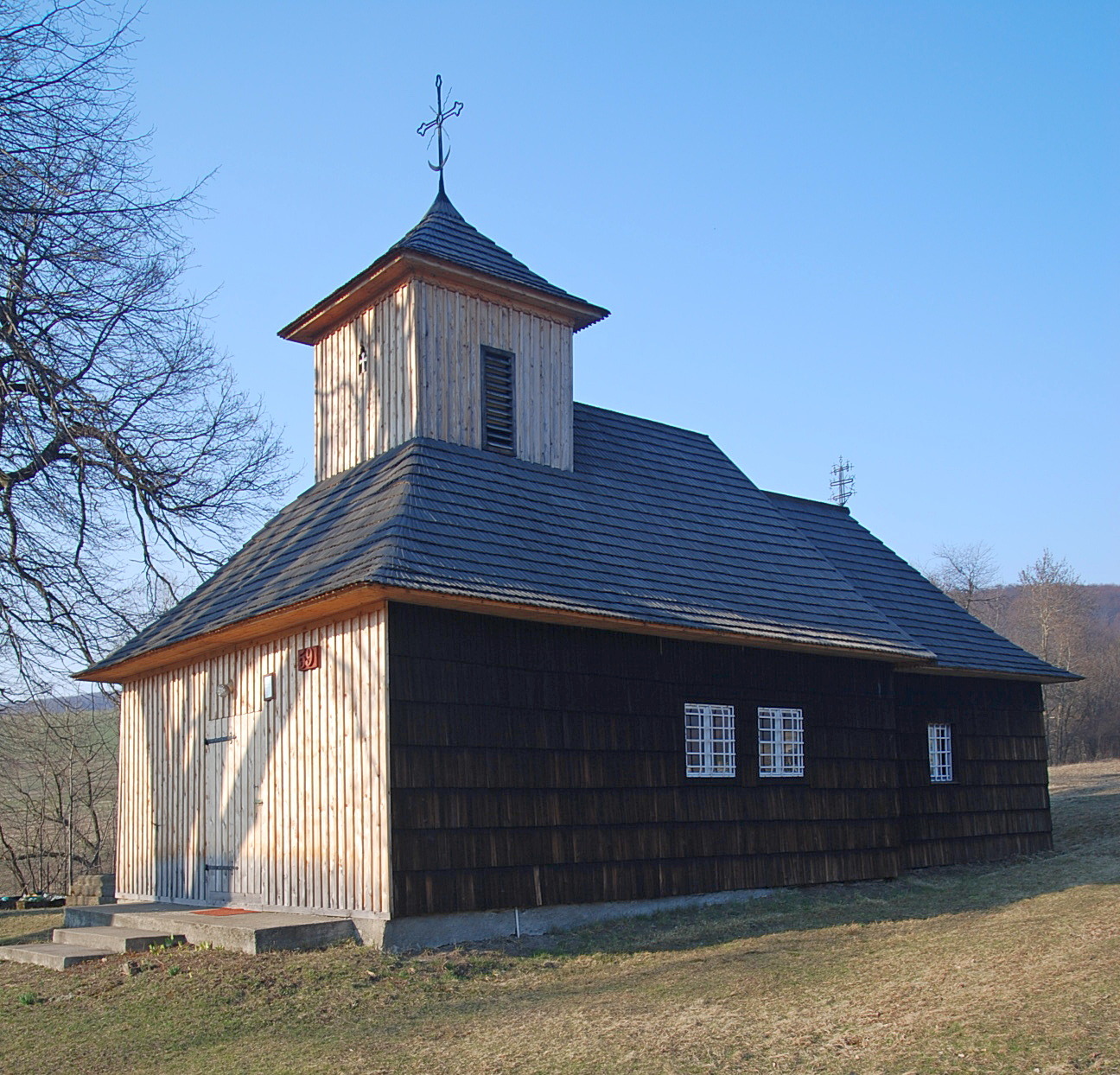

- Flag

- Location of Vyšná Polianka in the Prešov Region Location of Vyšná Polianka in Slovakia
- Coordinates: 49.43°N 21.37°E
- Country: Slovakia
- Region: Prešov Region
- District: Bardejov District
- First mentioned: 1572

Area
  - Total: 5.70 km^{2} (2.20 sq mi)
- Elevation: 452 m (1,483 ft)

Population (2025)
  - Total: 118
- Time zone: UTC+1 (CET)
  - Summer (DST): UTC+2 (CEST)
- Postal code: 863 6
- Area code: +421 54
- Vehicle registration plate (until 2022): BJ
- Website: www.vysnapolianka.sk

Vyšná Polianka (Rusyn: Вышня Полянка, romanized: Vyshnia Polianka, Ukrainian: Вишня Полянка, romanized: Vishnia Polianka, Hungarian: Felsőpagony) is a village and municipality in Bardejov District in the Prešov Region of north-east Slovakia.

== History ==
In historical records, the village was first mentioned in 1572.

== Geography ==
The municipality lies at an altitude of 452 metres (1,483 ft) and covers an area of 5.70 km^{2} (2.20 sq mi) (2025).

== Population ==
Population statistic (10 years)
Year	1995	2005	2015	2025
Count	150	128	113	118
Difference		−14.66%	−11.71%	+4.42%

Population statistic
Year	2024	2025
Count	110	118
Difference		+7.27%

It has a population of 118 people (31 December 2025).

=== Ethnicity ===
Census 2021 (1+ %)
Ethnicity	Number	Fraction
Rusyn	79	72.47%
Slovak	59	54.12%
Ukrainian	2	1.83%
Not found out	2	1.83%
Total	109	

In year 2021 was 109 people by ethnicity 79 as Rusyn, 59 as Slovak, 2 as Ukrainian, 2 as Not found out and 1 as Romani.

Note on population: The difference values of population numbers in the table "Population statistic" and in the sections "Ethnicity" & "Religion" is caused by the use of various statistical methods.

=== Religion ===
Census 2021 (1+ %)
Religion	Number	Fraction
Eastern Orthodox Church	62	56.88%
Greek Catholic Church	26	23.85%
Roman Catholic Church	10	9.17%
None	9	8.26%
Total	109	

In year 2021 was 109 people by religion 62 from Eastern Orthodox Church, 26 from Greek Catholic Church, 10 from Roman Catholic Church, 9 from None, 1 from Not found out and 1 from Evangelical Church.
