= Lascov =

- Municipality
- Flag

- Location of Lascov in the Prešov Region Location of Lascov in Slovakia
- Coordinates: 49.17°N 21.48°E
- Country: Slovakia
- Region: Prešov Region
- District: Bardejov District
- First mentioned: 1370

Area
  - Total: 5.34 km^{2} (2.06 sq mi)
- Elevation: 193 m (633 ft)

Population (2025)
  - Total: 609
- Time zone: UTC+1 (CET)
  - Summer (DST): UTC+2 (CEST)
- Postal code: 864 5
- Area code: +421 54
- Vehicle registration plate (until 2022): BJ
- Website: www.obeclascov.sk

Lascov is a village and municipality in Bardejov District in the Prešov Region of north-east Slovakia.

== History ==
The village was first mentioned in historical records in 1370.

It has a population of about 530 people.

== Geography ==
The municipality lies at an altitude of 193 metres (633 ft) and covers an area of 5.34 km^{2} (2.06 sq mi) (2025).

== Population ==
Population statistic (10 years)
| Year | 1995 | 2005 | 2015 | 2025 |
|---|---|---|---|---|
| Count | 497 | 526 | 573 | 609 |
| Difference | | +5.83% | +8.93% | +6.28% |

Population statistic
| Year | 2024 | 2025 |
|---|---|---|
| Count | 604 | 609 |
| Difference | | +0.82% |

It has a population of 609 people (31 December 2025).

=== Ethnicity ===
Census 2021 (1+ %)
| Ethnicity | Number | Fraction |
|---|---|---|
| Slovak | 566 | 97.08% |
| Romani | 212 | 36.36% |
| Not found out | 17 | 2.91% |
| Total | 583 | |

In year 2021 was 583 people by ethnicity 566 as Slovak, 212 as Romani, 17 as Not found out, 5 as Rusyn, 2 as Czech and 1 as Other.

Note on population: The difference values of population numbers in the table "Population statistic" and in the sections "Ethnicity" & "Religion" is caused by the use of various statistical methods.

=== Religion ===
Census 2021 (1+ %)
| Religion | Number | Fraction |
|---|---|---|
| Roman Catholic Church | 378 | 64.84% |
| Evangelical Church | 77 | 13.21% |
| Greek Catholic Church | 67 | 11.49% |
| None | 37 | 6.35% |
| Not found out | 16 | 2.74% |
| Eastern Orthodox Church | 7 | 1.2% |
| Total | 583 | |

In year 2021 was 583 people by religion 378 from Roman Catholic Church, 77 from Evangelical Church, 67 from Greek Catholic Church, 37 from None, 16 from Not found out, 7 from Eastern Orthodox Church and 1 from Other.
