= Ondavka =

- Municipality
- Location of Ondavka in the Prešov Region Location of Ondavka in Slovakia
- Coordinates: 49.43°N 21.35°E
- Country: Slovakia
- Region: Prešov Region
- District: Bardejov District
- First mentioned: 1618

Area
  - Total: 3.46 km^{2} (1.34 sq mi)
- Elevation: 481 m (1,578 ft)

Population (2025)
  - Total: 11
- Time zone: UTC+1 (CET)
  - Summer (DST): UTC+2 (CEST)
- Postal code: 863 6
- Area code: +421 54
- Vehicle registration plate (until 2022): BJ

Ondavka (Rusyn: Ондавка) is a small village and municipality in Bardejov District in the Prešov Region of north-east Slovakia.

== History ==
In historical records the village was first mentioned in 1618. The population peaked in 1928 at 190 residents. As of 2024, there are 11 people left in the village. By the late 2010s, the village had no mayor as there was nobody interested in running for the office and was so heavily indebted that the village hall was foreclosed. Nonetheless, the village resisted all initiatives to merge it with one of the surrounding villages.

== Geography ==
The municipality lies at an altitude of 481 metres (1,578 ft) and covers an area of 3.46 km^{2} (1.34 sq mi) (2025).

== Population ==
Population statistic (10 years)
Year	1995	2005	2015	2025
Count	42	32	18	11
Difference		−23.80%	−43.75%	−38.88%

Population statistic
Year	2024	2025
Count	10	11
Difference		+10%

It has a population of 11 people (31 December 2025).

=== Ethnicity ===
Census 2021 (1+ %)
Ethnicity	Number	Fraction
Rusyn	11	73.33%
Slovak	6	40%
Total	15	

In year 2021 was 15 people by ethnicity 11 as Rusyn and 6 as Slovak.

Note on population: The difference values of population numbers in the table "Population statistic" and in the sections "Ethnicity" & "Religion" is caused by the use of various statistical methods.

=== Religion ===
Census 2021 (1+ %)
Religion	Number	Fraction
Greek Catholic Church	10	66.67%
Eastern Orthodox Church	2	13.33%
None	2	13.33%
Evangelical Church	1	6.67%
Total	15	

In year 2021 was 15 people by religion 10 from Greek Catholic Church, 2 from Eastern Orthodox Church, 2 from None and 1 from Evangelical Church.
