= Zlaté =

- Municipality
- Flag

- Location of Zlaté in the Prešov Region Location of Zlaté in Slovakia
- Coordinates: 49.33°N 21.20°E
- Country: Slovakia
- Region: Prešov Region
- District: Bardejov District
- First mentioned: 1355

Area
  - Total: 14.33 km^{2} (5.53 sq mi)
- Elevation: 389 m (1,276 ft)

Population (2025)
  - Total: 773
- Time zone: UTC+1 (CET)
  - Summer (DST): UTC+2 (CEST)
- Postal code: 860 1
- Area code: +421 54
- Vehicle registration plate (until 2022): BJ
- Website: www.obeczlate.sk

Zlate (Rusyn: Злате) is a village and municipality in Bardejov District in the Prešov Region of north-east Slovakia.

== History ==
In historical records the village was first mentioned in 1355.

== Geography ==
The municipality lies at an altitude of 389 metres (1,276 ft) and covers an area of 14.33 km^{2} (5.53 sq mi) (2025).

== Population ==
Population statistic (10 years)
Year	1995	2005	2015	2025
Count	727	744	753	773
Difference		+2.33%	+1.20%	+2.65%

Population statistic
Year	2024	2025
Count	771	773
Difference		+0.25%

It has a population of 773 people (31 December 2025).

=== Ethnicity ===
Census 2021 (1+ %)
Ethnicity	Number	Fraction
Slovak	754	98.69%
Rusyn	16	2.09%
Total	764	

In year 2021 was 764 people by ethnicity 754 as Slovak, 16 as Rusyn, 5 as Not found out, 2 as Czech, 2 as Ukrainian, 2 as Italian, 1 as Hungarian and 1 as English.

Note on population: The difference values of population numbers in the table "Population statistic" and in the sections "Ethnicity" & "Religion" is caused by the use of various statistical methods.

=== Religion ===
Census 2021 (1+ %)
Religion	Number	Fraction
Evangelical Church	512	67.02%
Roman Catholic Church	180	23.56%
Greek Catholic Church	27	3.53%
None	21	2.75%
Other and not ascertained christian church	11	1.44%
Total	764	

In year 2021 was 764 people by religion 512 from Evangelical Church, 180 from Roman Catholic Church, 27 from Greek Catholic Church, 21 from None, 11 from Other and not ascertained christian church, 3 from Eastern Orthodox Church, 3 from Not found out, 3 from Apostolic Church, 2 from Christian Congregations in Slovakia, 1 from United Methodist Church and 1 from Buddhism.
