= Vyšný Kručov =

- Municipality
- Location of Vyšný Kručov in the Prešov Region Location of Vyšný Kručov in Slovakia
- Coordinates: 49.17°N 21.43°E
- Country: Slovakia
- Region: Prešov Region
- District: Bardejov District
- First mentioned: 1391

Area
  - Total: 3.94 km^{2} (1.52 sq mi)
- Elevation: 196 m (643 ft)

Population (2025)
  - Total: 150
- Time zone: UTC+1 (CET)
  - Summer (DST): UTC+2 (CEST)
- Postal code: 864 5
- Area code: +421 54
- Vehicle registration plate (until 2022): BJ
- Website: obecvysnykrucov.sk

Vyšný Kručov is a small village and municipality in Bardejov District in the Prešov Region of north-east Slovakia.

== History ==
In historical records the village was first mentioned in 1391.

== Geography ==
The municipality lies at an altitude of 196 metres (643 ft) and covers an area of 3.94 km^{2} (1.52 sq mi) (2025).

== Population ==
Population statistic (10 years)
Year	1995	2005	2015	2025
Count	147	149	148	150
Difference		+1.36%	−0.67%	+1.35%

Population statistic
Year	2024	2025
Count	150	150
Difference		+0%

It has a population of 150 people (31 December 2025).

=== Ethnicity ===
Census 2021 (1+ %)
Ethnicity	Number	Fraction
Slovak	150	99.33%
Total	151	

In year 2021 was 151 people by ethnicity 150 as Slovak and 1 as Polish.

Note on population: The difference values of population numbers in the table "Population statistic" and in the sections "Ethnicity" & "Religion" is caused by the use of various statistical methods.

=== Religion ===
Census 2021 (1+ %)
Religion	Number	Fraction
Evangelical Church	75	49.67%
Roman Catholic Church	72	47.68%
Greek Catholic Church	2	1.32%
None	2	1.32%
Total	151	

In year 2021 was 151 people by religion 75 from Evangelical Church, 72 from Roman Catholic Church, 2 from Greek Catholic Church and 2 from None.
