= Rokytov =

- Municipality
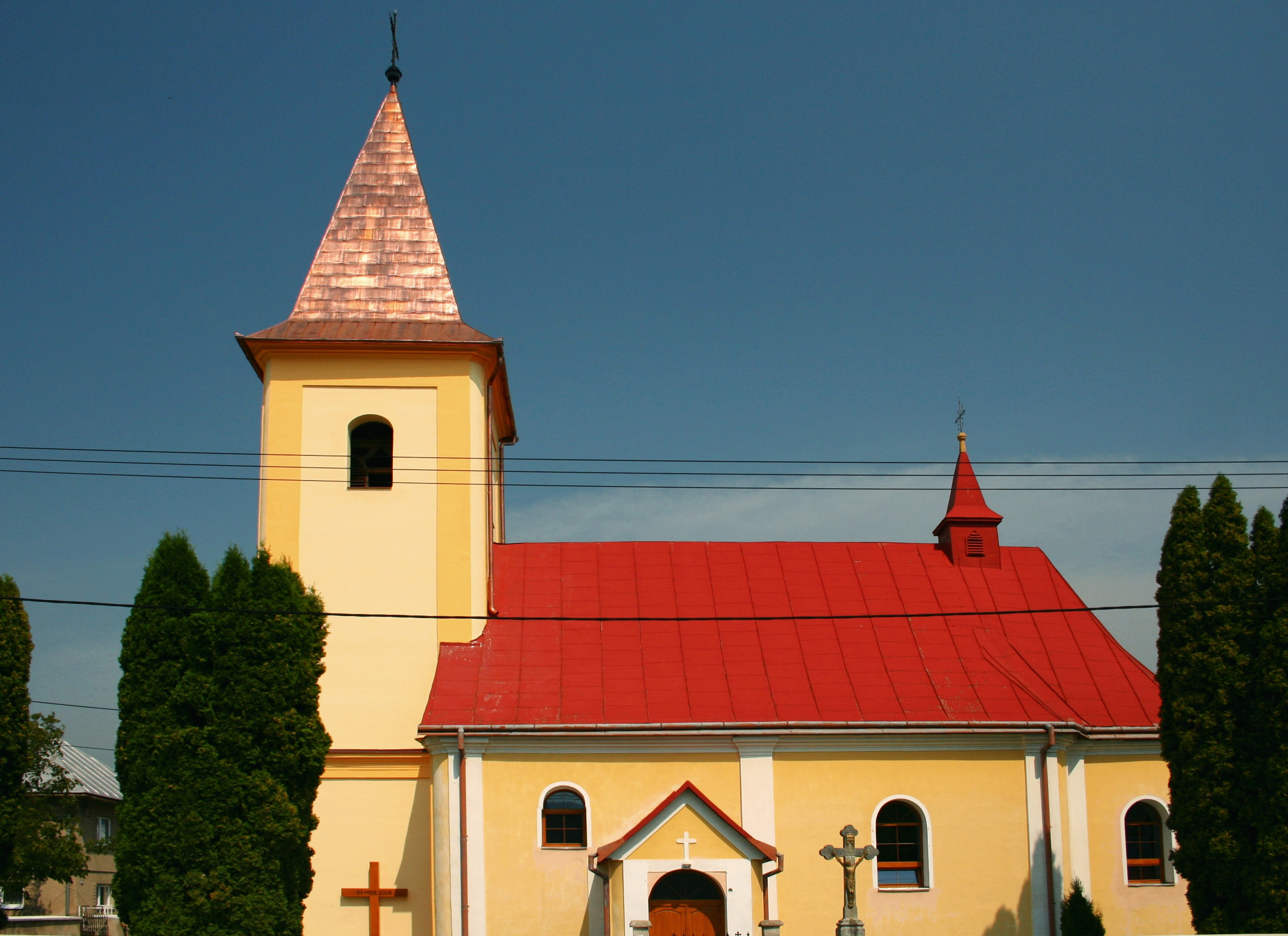

- Flag

- Location of Rokytov in the Prešov Region Location of Rokytov in Slovakia
- Coordinates: 49.32°N 21.19°E
- Country: Slovakia
- Region: Prešov Region
- District: Bardejov District
- First mentioned: 1414

Area
  - Total: 5.13 km^{2} (1.98 sq mi)
- Elevation: 315 m (1,033 ft)

Population (2025)
  - Total: 557
- Time zone: UTC+1 (CET)
  - Summer (DST): UTC+2 (CEST)
- Postal code: 860 1
- Area code: +421 54
- Vehicle registration plate (until 2022): BJ
- Website: www.obecrokytov.sk

Rokytov is a village and municipality in Bardejov District in the Prešov Region of north-east Slovakia.

== History ==
In historical records the village was first mentioned in 1414

== Geography ==
The municipality lies at an altitude of 315 metres (1,033 ft) and covers an area of 5.13 km^{2} (1.98 sq mi) (2025).

== Population ==
Population statistic (10 years)
Year	1995	2005	2015	2025
Count	499	532	562	557
Difference		+6.61%	+5.63%	−0.88%

Population statistic
Year	2024	2025
Count	567	557
Difference		−1.76%

It has a population of 557 people (31 December 2025).

=== Ethnicity ===
Census 2021 (1+ %)
Ethnicity	Number	Fraction
Slovak	530	96.01%
Romani	79	14.31%
Not found out	17	3.07%
Rusyn	7	1.26%
Total	552	

In year 2021 was 552 people by ethnicity 530 as Slovak, 79 as Romani, 17 as Not found out, 7 as Rusyn, 2 as English, 1 as Czech, 1 as Ukrainian, 1 as Russian, 1 as Other and 1 as Bulgarian.

Note on population: The difference values of population numbers in the table "Population statistic" and in the sections "Ethnicity" & "Religion" is caused by the use of various statistical methods.

=== Religion ===
Census 2021 (1+ %)
Religion	Number	Fraction
Roman Catholic Church	306	55.43%
Evangelical Church	174	31.52%
None	28	5.07%
Greek Catholic Church	23	4.17%
Not found out	8	1.45%
Total	552	

In year 2021 was 552 people by religion 306 from Roman Catholic Church, 174 from Evangelical Church, 28 from None, 23 from Greek Catholic Church, 8 from Not found out, 5 from Eastern Orthodox Church, 2 from Calvinist Church, 2 from Other and not ascertained christian church, 2 from Christian Congregations in Slovakia, 1 from Old Catholic Church and 1 from Jehovah's Witnesses.
