= Rešov =

- Municipality
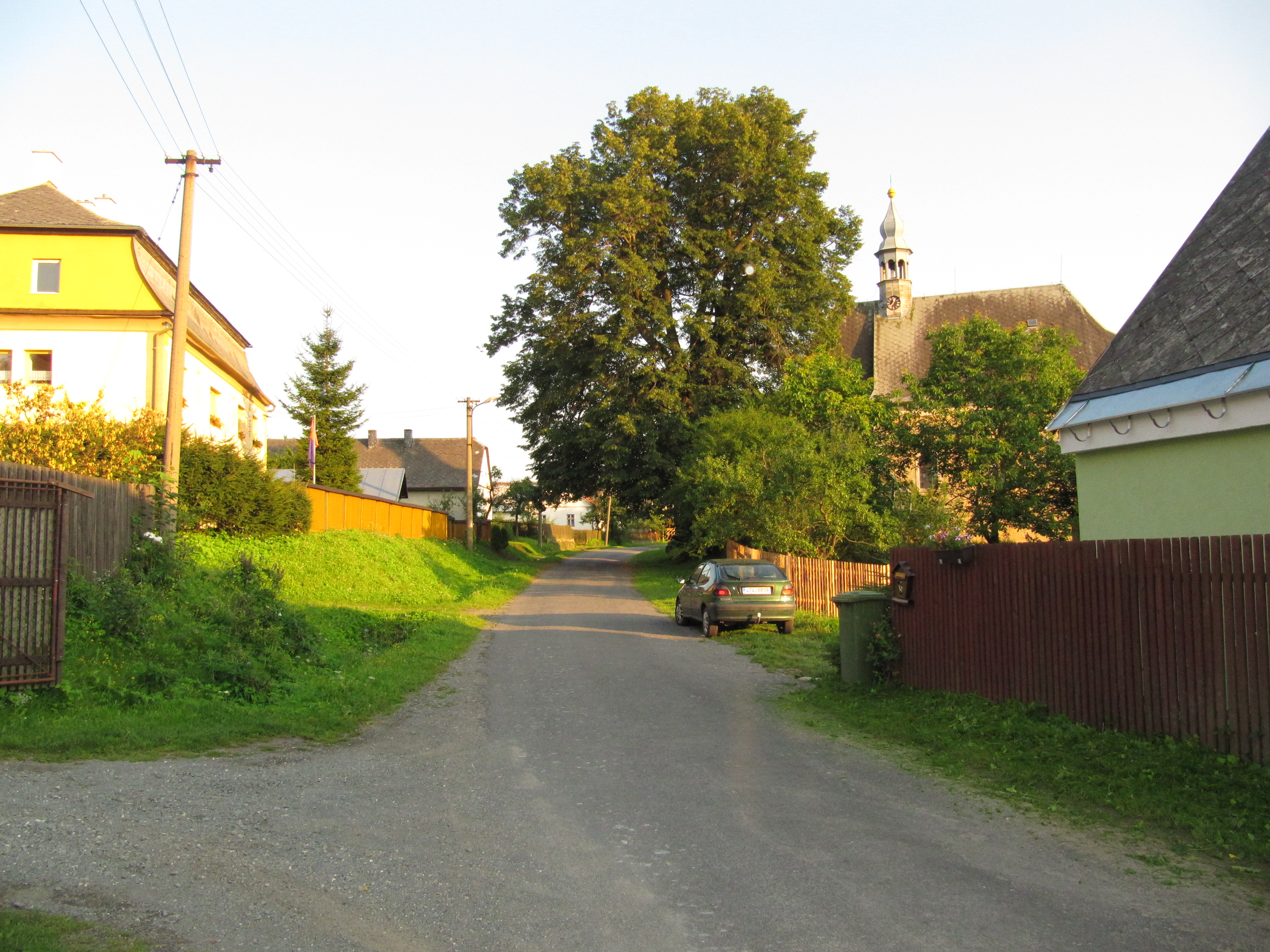

- Flag Coat of arms

- Location of Rešov in the Prešov Region Location of Rešov in Slovakia
- Coordinates: 49.23°N 21.33°E
- Country: Slovakia
- Region: Prešov Region
- District: Bardejov District
- First mentioned: 1454

Area
  - Total: 9.16 km^{2} (3.54 sq mi)
- Elevation: 489 m (1,604 ft)

Population (2025)
  - Total: 315
- Time zone: UTC+1 (CET)
  - Summer (DST): UTC+2 (CEST)
- Postal code: 862 1
- Area code: +421 54
- Vehicle registration plate (until 2022): BJ
- Website: www.obecresov.sk

Rešov (Rusyn: Ряшов, Ukrainian: Ряшів, Riashiv) is a village and municipality in Bardejov District in the Prešov Region of north-east Slovakia.

== History ==
In historical records the village was first mentioned in 1454.

== Geography ==
The municipality lies at an altitude of 489 metres (1,604 ft) and covers an area of 9.16 km^{2} (3.54 sq mi) (2025).

== Population ==
Population statistic (10 years)
| Year | 1995 | 2005 | 2015 | 2025 |
|---|---|---|---|---|
| Count | 351 | 351 | 309 | 315 |
| Difference | | +0% | −11.96% | +1.94% |

Population statistic
| Year | 2024 | 2025 |
|---|---|---|
| Count | 313 | 315 |
| Difference | | +0.63% |

It has a population of 315 people (31 December 2025).

=== Ethnicity ===
Census 2021 (1+ %)
| Ethnicity | Number | Fraction |
|---|---|---|
| Slovak | 284 | 93.72% |
| Rusyn | 86 | 28.38% |
| Not found out | 7 | 2.31% |
| Ukrainian | 4 | 1.32% |
| Total | 303 | |

In year 2021 was 303 people by ethnicity 284 as Slovak, 86 as Rusyn, 7 as Not found out, 4 as Ukrainian, 2 as Czech, 1 as German and 1 as Other.

Note on population: The difference values of population numbers in the table "Population statistic" and in the sections "Ethnicity" & "Religion" is caused by the use of various statistical methods.

=== Religion ===
Census 2021 (1+ %)
| Religion | Number | Fraction |
|---|---|---|
| Greek Catholic Church | 229 | 75.58% |
| Roman Catholic Church | 28 | 9.24% |
| Evangelical Church | 22 | 7.26% |
| None | 9 | 2.97% |
| Eastern Orthodox Church | 7 | 2.31% |
| Not found out | 7 | 2.31% |
| Total | 303 | |

In year 2021 was 303 people by religion 229 from Greek Catholic Church, 28 from Roman Catholic Church, 22 from Evangelical Church, 9 from None, 7 from Eastern Orthodox Church, 7 from Not found out and 1 from Other.
