= Oľšavce =

- Municipality
- Flag

- Location of Oľšavce in the Prešov Region Location of Oľšavce in Slovakia
- Coordinates: 49.20°N 21.38°E
- Country: Slovakia
- Region: Prešov Region
- District: Bardejov District
- First mentioned: 1383

Area
  - Total: 5.04 km^{2} (1.95 sq mi)
- Elevation: 253 m (830 ft)

Population (2025)
  - Total: 156
- Time zone: UTC+1 (CET)
  - Summer (DST): UTC+2 (CEST)
- Postal code: 864 6
- Area code: +421 54
- Vehicle registration plate (until 2022): BJ
- Website: olsavce.sk

Oľšavce is a village and municipality in Bardejov District in the Prešov Region of north-east Slovakia.

== History ==
In historical records, the village was first mentioned in 1383.

== Geography ==
The municipality lies at an altitude of 253 metres (830 ft) and covers an area of 5.04 km^{2} (1.95 sq mi) (2025).

== Population ==
Population statistic (10 years)
Year	1995	2005	2015	2025
Count	169	163	180	156
Difference		−3.55%	+10.42%	−13.33%

Population statistic
Year	2024	2025
Count	159	156
Difference		−1.88%

It has a population of 156 people (31 December 2025).

=== Ethnicity ===
Census 2021 (1+ %)
Ethnicity	Number	Fraction
Slovak	161	97.57%
Not found out	3	1.81%
Total	165	

In year 2021 was 165 people by ethnicity 161 as Slovak, 3 as Not found out, 1 as Czech, 1 as Ukrainian and 1 as Rusyn.

Note on population: The difference values of population numbers in the table "Population statistic" and in the sections "Ethnicity" & "Religion" is caused by the use of various statistical methods.

=== Religion ===
Census 2021 (1+ %)
Religion	Number	Fraction
Evangelical Church	90	54.55%
Roman Catholic Church	66	40%
Not found out	5	3.03%
Greek Catholic Church	3	1.82%
Total	165	

In year 2021 was 165 people by religion 90 from Evangelical Church, 66 from Roman Catholic Church, 5 from Not found out, 3 from Greek Catholic Church and 1 from None.
