= Fričkovce =

- Municipality
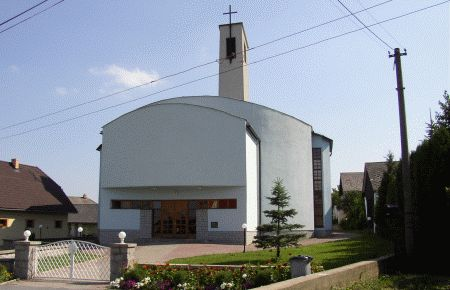

- Flag

- Location of Fričkovce in the Prešov Region Location of Fričkovce in Slovakia
- Coordinates: 49.18°N 21.25°E
- Country: Slovakia
- Region: Prešov Region
- District: Bardejov District
- First mentioned: 1320

Area
  - Total: 9.35 km^{2} (3.61 sq mi)
- Elevation: 437 m (1,434 ft)

Population (2025)
  - Total: 726
- Time zone: UTC+1 (CET)
  - Summer (DST): UTC+2 (CEST)
- Postal code: 864 2
- Area code: +421 54
- Vehicle registration plate (until 2022): BJ
- Website: www.frickovce.sk

Fričkovce is a village and municipality in Bardejov District in the Prešov Region of north-east Slovakia.

== History ==
In historical records the village was first mentioned in 1320.

== Geography ==
The municipality lies at an altitude of 437 metres (1,434 ft) and covers an area of 9.35 km^{2} (3.61 sq mi) (2025).

== Population ==
Population statistic (10 years)
Year	1995	2005	2015	2025
Count	680	681	724	726
Difference		+0.14%	+6.31%	+0.27%

Population statistic
Year	2024	2025
Count	729	726
Difference		−0.41%

It has a population of 726 people (31 December 2025).

=== Ethnicity ===
Census 2021 (1+ %)
Ethnicity	Number	Fraction
Slovak	690	94.39%
Not found out	38	5.19%
Rusyn	16	2.18%
Total	731	

In year 2021 was 731 people by ethnicity 690 as Slovak, 38 as Not found out, 16 as Rusyn, 1 as Czech, 1 as Ukrainian, 1 as Polish, 1 as Moravian, 1 as Canadian, 1 as Other and 1 as Croatian.

Note on population: The difference values of population numbers in the table "Population statistic" and in the sections "Ethnicity" & "Religion" is caused by the use of various statistical methods.

=== Religion ===
Census 2021 (1+ %)
Religion	Number	Fraction
Roman Catholic Church	636	87%
Not found out	38	5.2%
None	26	3.56%
Greek Catholic Church	23	3.15%
Total	731	

In year 2021 was 731 people by religion 636 from Roman Catholic Church, 38 from Not found out, 26 from None, 23 from Greek Catholic Church, 3 from Evangelical Church, 2 from Other and not ascertained christian church, 2 from Ad hoc movements and 1 from Calvinist Church.

== Genealogical resources ==
The records for genealogical research are available at the state archive "Statny Archiv in Presov, Slovakia"

- Roman Catholic church records (births/marriages/deaths): 1745-1896 (parish B)
- Greek Catholic church records (births/marriages/deaths): 1800-1895 (parish B)

== See also ==
- List of municipalities and towns in Slovakia
