= Marhaň =

- Municipality
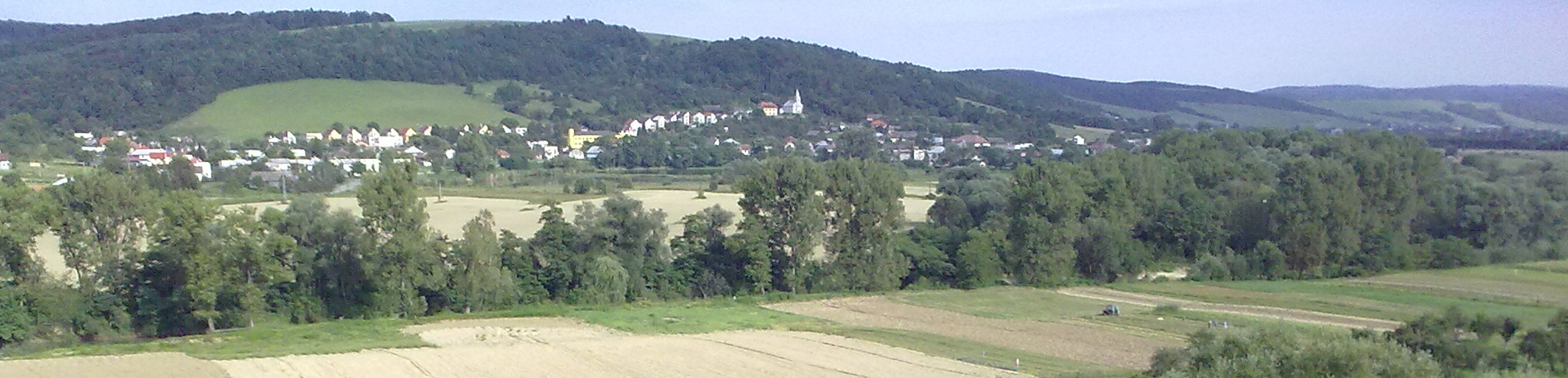

- Flag

- Location of Marhaň in the Prešov Region Location of Marhaň in Slovakia
- Coordinates: 49.17°N 21.47°E
- Country: Slovakia
- Region: Prešov Region
- District: Bardejov District
- First mentioned: 1277

Area
  - Total: 10.39 km^{2} (4.01 sq mi)
- Elevation: 195 m (640 ft)

Population (2025)
  - Total: 954
- Time zone: UTC+1 (CET)
  - Summer (DST): UTC+2 (CEST)
- Postal code: 864 5
- Area code: +421 54
- Vehicle registration plate (until 2022): BJ
- Website: www.obecmarhan.sk

Marhaň is a village and municipality in Bardejov District in the Prešov Region of north-east Slovakia.

== History ==
In historical records the village was first mentioned in 1277

== Geography ==
The municipality lies at an altitude of 195 metres (640 ft) and covers an area of 10.39 km^{2} (4.01 sq mi) (2025).

== Population ==
Population statistic (10 years)
Year	1995	2005	2015	2025
Count	887	948	963	954
Difference		+6.87%	+1.58%	−0.93%

Population statistic
Year	2024	2025
Count	955	954
Difference		−0.10%

It has a population of 954 people (31 December 2025).

=== Ethnicity ===
Census 2021 (1+ %)
Ethnicity	Number	Fraction
Slovak	902	94.74%
Romani	95	9.97%
Not found out	48	5.04%
Rusyn	11	1.15%
Total	952	

In year 2021 was 952 people by ethnicity 902 as Slovak, 95 as Romani, 48 as Not found out, 11 as Rusyn, 4 as Czech, 2 as Ukrainian, 2 as Hungarian, 1 as Russian, 1 as Other and 1 as English.

Note on population: The difference values of population numbers in the table "Population statistic" and in the sections "Ethnicity" & "Religion" is caused by the use of various statistical methods.

=== Religion ===
Census 2021 (1+ %)
Religion	Number	Fraction
Roman Catholic Church	684	71.85%
Evangelical Church	121	12.71%
None	51	5.36%
Greek Catholic Church	45	4.73%
Not found out	40	4.2%
Total	952	

In year 2021 was 952 people by religion 684 from Roman Catholic Church, 121 from Evangelical Church, 51 from None, 45 from Greek Catholic Church, 40 from Not found out, 7 from Eastern Orthodox Church, 2 from Other and not ascertained christian church, 1 from Christian Congregations in Slovakia and 1 from Other.
