= Regetovka =

- Municipality
- Flag

- Location of Regetovka in the Prešov Region Location of Regetovka in Slovakia
- Coordinates: 49.42°N 21.28°E
- Country: Slovakia
- Region: Prešov Region
- District: Bardejov District
- First mentioned: 1618

Area
  - Total: 7.12 km^{2} (2.75 sq mi)
- Elevation: 463 m (1,519 ft)

Population (2025)
  - Total: 52
- Time zone: UTC+1 (CET)
  - Summer (DST): UTC+2 (CEST)
- Postal code: 863 5
- Area code: +421 54
- Vehicle registration plate (until 2022): BJ
- Website: www.regetovka.info/aktuality

Regetovka is a small village and municipality in Bardejov District in the Prešov Region of north-east Slovakia.

== History ==
In historical records the village was first mentioned in 1618

== Geography ==
The municipality lies at an altitude of 463 metres (1,519 ft) and covers an area of 7.12 km^{2} (2.75 sq mi) (2025).

== Population ==
Population statistic (10 years)
| Year | 1995 | 2005 | 2015 | 2025 |
|---|---|---|---|---|
| Count | 22 | 18 | 29 | 52 |
| Difference | | −18.18% | +61.11% | +79.31% |

Population statistic
| Year | 2024 | 2025 |
|---|---|---|
| Count | 52 | 52 |
| Difference | | +0% |

It has a population of 52 people (31 December 2025).

=== Ethnicity ===
Census 2021 (1+ %)
| Ethnicity | Number | Fraction |
|---|---|---|
| Slovak | 44 | 95.65% |
| Rusyn | 6 | 13.04% |
| Czech | 2 | 4.34% |
| Ukrainian | 1 | 2.17% |
| Not found out | 1 | 2.17% |
| Total | 46 | |

In year 2021 was 46 people by ethnicity 44 as Slovak, 6 as Rusyn, 2 as Czech, 1 as Ukrainian and 1 as Not found out.

Note on population: The difference values of population numbers in the table "Population statistic" and in the sections "Ethnicity" & "Religion" is caused by the use of various statistical methods.

=== Religion ===
Census 2021 (1+ %)
| Religion | Number | Fraction |
|---|---|---|
| Greek Catholic Church | 16 | 34.78% |
| Roman Catholic Church | 15 | 32.61% |
| Evangelical Church | 7 | 15.22% |
| None | 6 | 13.04% |
| Eastern Orthodox Church | 1 | 2.17% |
| Not found out | 1 | 2.17% |
| Total | 46 | |

In year 2021 was 46 people by religion 16 from Greek Catholic Church, 15 from Roman Catholic Church, 7 from Evangelical Church, 6 from None, 1 from Eastern Orthodox Church and 1 from Not found out.
