= Bardejov District =

Coordinates: 49°17′41″N 21°16′35″E

- District
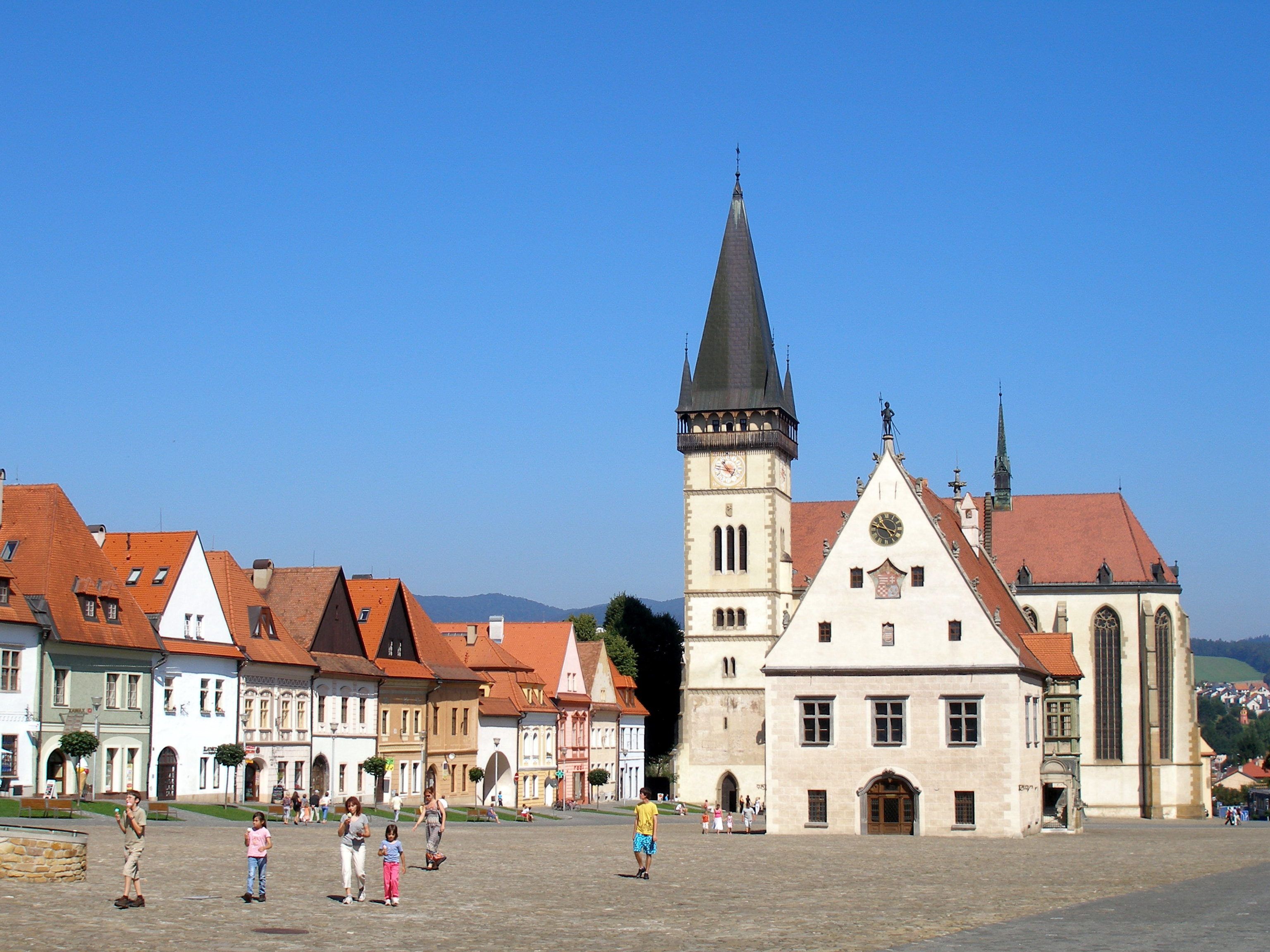
- Country: Slovakia
- Region (kraj): Prešov Region
- Seat: Bardejov

Area
  - Total: 935.95 km^{2} (361.37 sq mi)

Population (2025)
  - Total: 75,554
- Time zone: UTC+1 (CET)
  - Summer (DST): UTC+2 (CEST)
- Telephone prefix: 035
- Vehicle registration plate (until 2022): BJ
- Municipalities: 86

Bardejov District (Slovak: okres Bardejov) is a district in the Prešov Region of eastern Slovakia. Until 1918, the district was part of Sáros County an administrative entity Austria-Hungary.

== Population ==
Population statistic (10 years)
Year	1995	2005	2015	2025
Count	74,066	76,543	77,806	75,554
Difference		+3.34%	+1.65%	−2.89%

Population statistic
Year	2024	2025
Count	75,664	75,554
Difference		−0.14%

It has a population of 75,554 people (31 December 2025).

Historical population
Year	Pop.	±%
1970	57,492	—
1980	65,328	+13.6%
1991	71,106	+8.8%
2001	75,793	+6.6%
2011	77,859	+2.7%
2021	76,012	−2.4%
Source: Statistical Office of the Slovak Republic

=== Ethnicity ===
Census 2021 (1+ %)
Ethnicity	Number	Fraction
Slovak	70,050	82.23%
Rusyn	5519	6.47%
Romani	4887	5.73%
Not found out	3406	3.99%
Total	85,180	

In year 2021 was 85,180 people by ethnicity 70,050 as Slovak, 5519 as Rusyn, 4887 as Romani, 3406 as Not found out, 383 as Ukrainian, 289 as Czech, 174 as Other, 120 as Polish, 85 as Hungarian, 66 as Russian, 39 as German, 32 as Vietnamese, 22 as English, 21 as Italian, 13 as Chinese, 10 as Jewish, 10 as Irish, 9 as Moravian, 8 as Austrian, 7 as Romanian, 6 as Albanian, 5 as Greek, 4 as Canadian, 3 as Turkish, 3 as Serbian, 3 as Croatian, 2 as Silesian, 2 as Bulgarian, 1 as Iranian and 1 as French.

Note on population: The difference values of population numbers in the table "Population statistic" and in the sections "Ethnicity" & "Religion" is caused by the use of various statistical methods.

=== Religion ===
Census 2021 (1+ %)
Religion	Number	Fraction
Roman Catholic Church	41,974	55.22%
Greek Catholic Church	13,644	17.95%
Evangelical Church	6573	8.65%
None	5784	7.61%
Eastern Orthodox Church	4109	5.41%
Not found out	2982	3.92%
Total	76,012	

In year 2021 was 76,012 people by religion 41,974 from Roman Catholic Church, 13,644 from Greek Catholic Church, 6573 from Evangelical Church, 5784 from None, 4109 from Eastern Orthodox Church, 2982 from Not found out, 177 from Church of the Brethren, 164 from Jehovah's Witnesses, 94 from Other, 93 from Apostolic Church, 87 from Other and not ascertained christian church, 85 from Christian Congregations in Slovakia, 81 from Ad hoc movements, 51 from Calvinist Church, 29 from Buddhism, 22 from Paganism and natural spirituality, 12 from Islam, 11 from Jewish community, 11 from United Methodist Church, 8 from Old Catholic Church, 8 from Seventh-day Adventist Church, 5 from Church of Jesus Christ of Latter-day Saints, 3 from Hinduism, 3 from Czechoslovak Hussite Church, 1 from New Apostolic Church and 1 from Baptists Church.

== Municipalities ==
Municipality	Area [km^{2}]	Population
Abrahámovce	5.89	324
Andrejová	11.67	354
Bardejov	72.77	29,495
Bartošovce	11.23	788
Becherov	19.09	281
Beloveža	10.15	789
Bogliarka	9.38	103
Brezov	6.89	324
Brezovka	3.26	110
Buclovany	4.09	206
Cigeľka	15.98	637
Dubinné	7.06	337
Frička	8.27	342
Fričkovce	9.35	726
Gaboltov	12.73	538
Gerlachov	8.89	1,060
Hankovce	8.89	436
Harhaj	4.42	255
Hažlín	20.11	1,056
Hertník	17.97	1,000
Hervartov	9.87	522
Hrabovec	7.76	494
Hrabské	10.90	666
Hutka	3.69	101
Chmeľová	12.43	366
Janovce	5.53	492
Jedlinka	4.55	82
Kľušov	15.35	1,071
Kobyly	12.45	899
Kochanovce	5.52	256
Komárov	7.99	475
Koprivnica	14.16	656
Kožany	5.10	107
Krivé	5.27	201
Kríže	14.93	56
Kružlov	10.13	975
Kučín	7.19	326
Kurima	15.87	1,136
Kurov	11.86	739
Lascov	5.34	609
Lenartov	14.76	1,261
Lipová	3.91	79
Livov	26.39	73
Livovská Huta	14.22	35
Lopúchov	8.13	310
Lukavica	8.29	370
Lukov	28.57	669
Malcov	18.94	1,622
Marhaň	10.39	954
Mikulášová	7.99	121
Mokroluh	7.94	756
Nemcovce	5.45	254
Nižná Polianka	5.88	223
Nižná Voľa	7.17	270
Nižný Tvarožec	11.15	578
Oľšavce	5.04	156
Ondavka	3.46	11
Ortuťová	6.02	222
Osikov	13.87	1,033
Petrová	14.29	1,010
Poliakovce	7.53	365
Porúbka	3.14	209
Raslavice	16.47	2,830
Regetovka	7.12	52
Rešov	9.16	315
Richvald	21.88	1,016
Rokytov	5.13	557
Smilno	13.80	704
Snakov	12.13	668
Stebnícka Huta	9.43	194
Stebník	20.53	301
Stuľany	8.11	538
Sveržov	5.70	684
Šarišské Čierne	14.00	300
Šašová	5.27	154
Šiba	13.82	629
Tarnov	5.84	418
Tročany	8.47	301
Vaniškovce	4.80	407
Varadka	7.37	249
Vyšná Polianka	5.70	118
Vyšná Voľa	8.83	398
Vyšný Kručov	3.94	150
Vyšný Tvarožec	8.21	120
Zborov	19.82	3,707
Zlaté	14.33	773

Population and area values are current for year 2025.
