= Malcov =

- Municipality
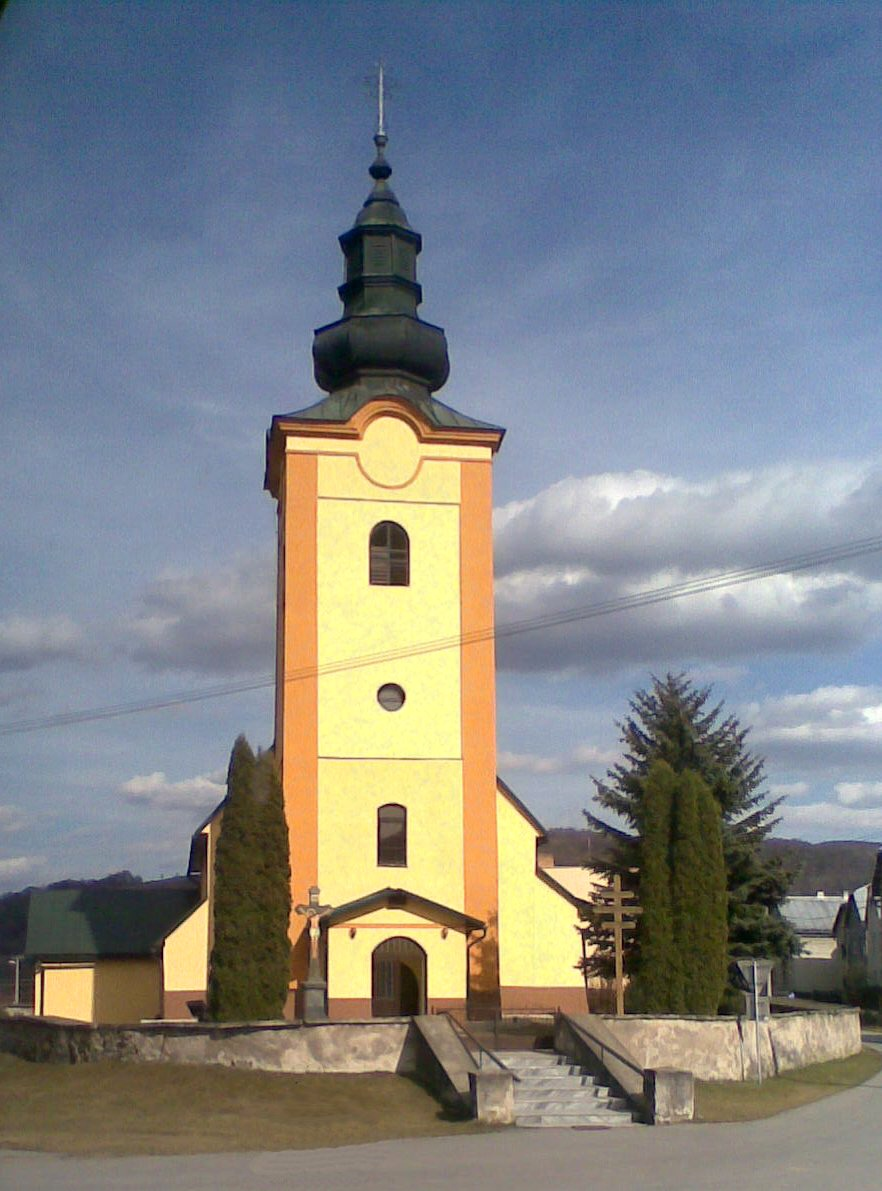
- Greek-Catholic church

- Flag

- Location of Malcov in the Prešov Region Location of Malcov in Slovakia
- Coordinates: 49.30°N 21.07°E
- Country: Slovakia
- Region: Prešov Region
- District: Bardejov District
- First mentioned: 1338

Area
  - Total: 18.94 km^{2} (7.31 sq mi)
- Elevation: 408 m (1,339 ft)

Population (2025)
  - Total: 1,622
- Time zone: UTC+1 (CET)
  - Summer (DST): UTC+2 (CEST)
- Postal code: 860 6
- Area code: +421 54
- Vehicle registration plate (until 2022): BJ
- Website: www.malcov.sk

Malcov is a village and municipality in Bardejov District in the Prešov Region of north-east Slovakia.

== History ==
In historical records the village was first mentioned in 1338

== Geography ==
The municipality lies at an altitude of 408 metres (1,339 ft) and covers an area of 18.94 km^{2} (7.31 sq mi) (2025).

== Population ==
Population statistic (10 years)
Year	1995	2005	2015	2025
Count	1387	1435	1585	1622
Difference		+3.46%	+10.45%	+2.33%

Population statistic
Year	2024	2025
Count	1608	1622
Difference		+0.87%

It has a population of 1622 people (31 December 2025).

=== Ethnicity ===
Census 2021 (1+ %)
Ethnicity	Number	Fraction
Slovak	1548	96.5%
Romani	427	26.62%
Not found out	64	3.99%
Rusyn	42	2.61%
Total	1604	

In year 2021 was 1604 people by ethnicity 1548 as Slovak, 427 as Romani, 64 as Not found out, 42 as Rusyn, 4 as Ukrainian, 4 as Other, 2 as Russian, 1 as Czech and 1 as Moravian.

Note on population: The difference values of population numbers in the table "Population statistic" and in the sections "Ethnicity" & "Religion" is caused by the use of various statistical methods.

=== Religion ===
Census 2021 (1+ %)
Religion	Number	Fraction
Greek Catholic Church	1122	69.95%
Roman Catholic Church	356	22.19%
None	63	3.93%
Not found out	26	1.62%
Total	1604	

In year 2021 was 1604 people by religion 1122 from Greek Catholic Church, 356 from Roman Catholic Church, 63 from None, 26 from Not found out, 15 from Eastern Orthodox Church, 9 from Evangelical Church, 6 from Apostolic Church, 2 from Other, 1 from Calvinist Church, 1 from Paganism and natural spirituality, 1 from Christian Congregations in Slovakia, 1 from Buddhism and 1 from Ad hoc movements.
