= Lopúchov =

- Municipality
- Flag

- Location of Lopúchov in the Prešov Region Location of Lopúchov in Slovakia
- Coordinates: 49.13°N 21.37°E
- Country: Slovakia
- Region: Prešov Region
- District: Bardejov District
- First mentioned: 1345

Area
  - Total: 8.13 km^{2} (3.14 sq mi)
- Elevation: 268 m (879 ft)

Population (2025)
  - Total: 310
- Time zone: UTC+1 (CET)
  - Summer (DST): UTC+2 (CEST)
- Postal code: 864 3
- Area code: +421 54
- Vehicle registration plate (until 2022): BJ
- Website: www.lopuchov.sk

Lopúchov is a village and municipality in Bardejov District in the Prešov Region of north-east Slovakia.

== History ==
In historical records the village was first mentioned in 1345.

== Geography ==
The municipality lies at an altitude of 268 metres (879 ft) and covers an area of 8.13 km^{2} (3.14 sq mi) (2025).

== Population ==
Population statistic (10 years)
Year	1995	2005	2015	2025
Count	316	320	325	310
Difference		+1.26%	+1.56%	−4.61%

Population statistic
Year	2024	2025
Count	311	310
Difference		−0.32%

It has a population of 310 people (31 December 2025).

=== Ethnicity ===
Census 2021 (1+ %)
Ethnicity	Number	Fraction
Slovak	309	99.35%
Total	311	

In year 2021 was 311 people by ethnicity 309 as Slovak, 3 as Czech, 3 as English, 2 as Ukrainian and 1 as Not found out.

Note on population: The difference values of population numbers in the table "Population statistic" and in the sections "Ethnicity" & "Religion" is caused by the use of various statistical methods.

=== Religion ===
Census 2021 (1+ %)
Religion	Number	Fraction
Roman Catholic Church	179	57.56%
Evangelical Church	113	36.33%
Other and not ascertained christian church	9	2.89%
None	6	1.93%
Total	311	

In year 2021 was 311 people by religion 179 from Roman Catholic Church, 113 from Evangelical Church, 9 from Other and not ascertained christian church, 6 from None, 2 from Greek Catholic Church, 1 from Not found out and 1 from Other.
