= Stebnícka Huta =

- Municipality
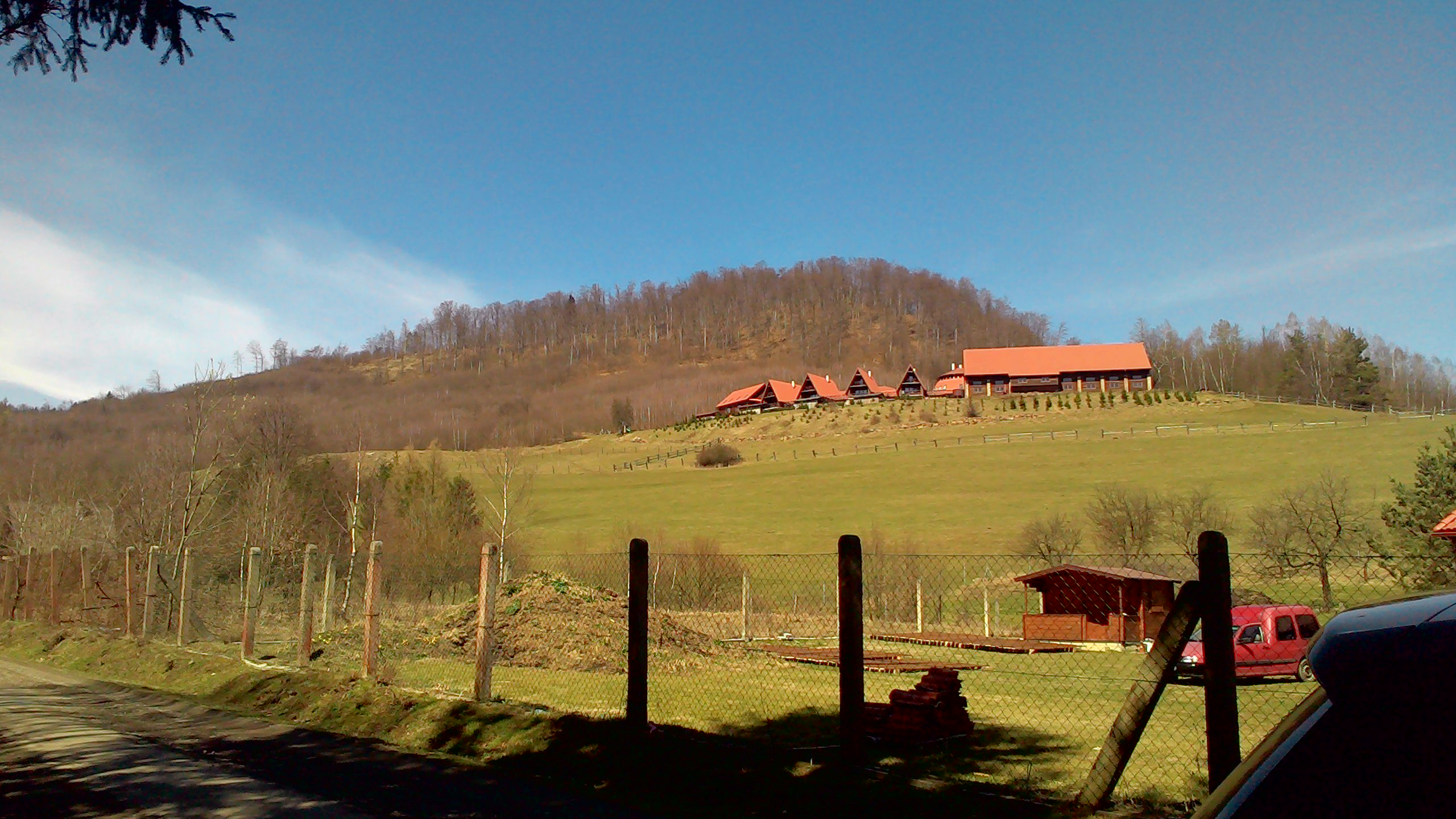

- Flag

- Location of Stebnícka Huta in the Prešov Region Location of Stebnícka Huta in Slovakia
- Coordinates: 49.42°N 21.25°E
- Country: Slovakia
- Region: Prešov Region
- District: Bardejov District
- First mentioned: 1600

Area
  - Total: 9.43 km^{2} (3.64 sq mi)
- Elevation: 490 m (1,610 ft)

Population (2025)
  - Total: 194
- Time zone: UTC+1 (CET)
  - Summer (DST): UTC+2 (CEST)
- Postal code: 863 3
- Area code: +421 54
- Vehicle registration plate (until 2022): BJ
- Website: www.stebnickahuta.sk

Stebnícka Huta is a village and municipality in Bardejov District in the Prešov Region of north-east Slovakia.

== History ==
In historical records the village was first mentioned in 1600.

== Geography ==
The municipality lies at an altitude of 490 metres (1,610 ft) and covers an area of 9.43 km^{2} (3.64 sq mi) (2025).

== Population ==
Population statistic (10 years)
Year	1995	2005	2015	2025
Count	243	253	235	194
Difference		+4.11%	−7.11%	−17.44%

Population statistic
Year	2024	2025
Count	194	194
Difference		+0%

It has a population of 194 people (31 December 2025).

=== Ethnicity ===
Census 2021 (1+ %)
Ethnicity	Number	Fraction
Slovak	195	95.58%
Not found out	6	2.94%
Rusyn	3	1.47%
Total	204	

In year 2021 was 204 people by ethnicity 195 as Slovak, 6 as Not found out, 3 as Rusyn, 1 as Jewish and 1 as Polish.

Note on population: The difference values of population numbers in the table "Population statistic" and in the sections "Ethnicity" & "Religion" is caused by the use of various statistical methods.

=== Religion ===
Census 2021 (1+ %)
Religion	Number	Fraction
Roman Catholic Church	181	88.73%
Greek Catholic Church	12	5.88%
Not found out	7	3.43%
Total	204	

In year 2021 was 204 people by religion 181 from Roman Catholic Church, 12 from Greek Catholic Church, 7 from Not found out, 2 from None, 1 from Eastern Orthodox Church and 1 from Evangelical Church.
