= Šarišské Čierne =

- Municipality
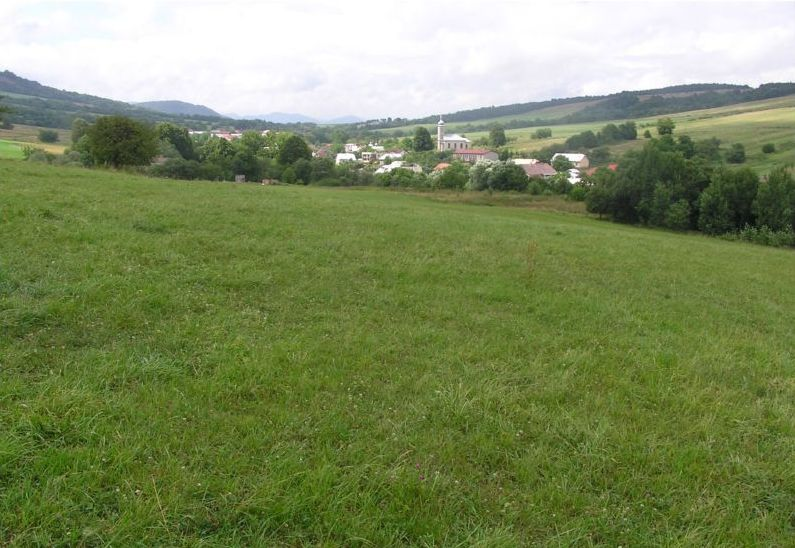

- Flag

- Location of Šarišské Čierne in the Prešov Region Location of Šarišské Čierne in Slovakia
- Coordinates: 49.35°N 21.38°E
- Country: Slovakia
- Region: Prešov Region
- District: Bardejov District
- First mentioned: 1414

Area
  - Total: 14.00 km^{2} (5.41 sq mi)
- Elevation: 368 m (1,207 ft)

Population (2025)
  - Total: 300
- Time zone: UTC+1 (CET)
  - Summer (DST): UTC+2 (CEST)
- Postal code: 863 7
- Area code: +421 54
- Vehicle registration plate (until 2022): BJ
- Website: www.sarisskecierne.sk

Šarišské Čierne is a village and municipality in Bardejov District in the Prešov Region of north-east Slovakia.

== History ==
In historical records, the village was first mentioned in 1414.

== Geography ==
The municipality lies at an altitude of 368 metres (1,207 ft) and covers an area of 14.00 km^{2} (5.41 sq mi) (2025).

== Population ==
Population statistic (10 years)
Year	1995	2005	2015	2025
Count	349	317	310	300
Difference		−9.16%	−2.20%	−3.22%

Population statistic
Year	2024	2025
Count	299	300
Difference		+0.33%

It has a population of 300 people (31 December 2025).

=== Ethnicity ===
Census 2021 (1+ %)
Ethnicity	Number	Fraction
Slovak	238	79.33%
Rusyn	126	42%
Romani	45	15%
Not found out	5	1.66%
Polish	3	1%
Total	300	

In year 2021 was 300 people by ethnicity 238 as Slovak, 126 as Rusyn, 45 as Romani, 5 as Not found out, 3 as Polish, 1 as Czech, 1 as Ukrainian and 1 as Other.

Note on population: The difference values of population numbers in the table "Population statistic" and in the sections "Ethnicity" & "Religion" is caused by the use of various statistical methods.

=== Religion ===
Census 2021 (1+ %)
Religion	Number	Fraction
Eastern Orthodox Church	141	47%
Greek Catholic Church	111	37%
None	19	6.33%
Roman Catholic Church	15	5%
Jehovah's Witnesses	6	2%
Christian Congregations in Slovakia	3	1%
Total	300	

In year 2021 was 300 people by religion 141 from Eastern Orthodox Church, 111 from Greek Catholic Church, 19 from None, 15 from Roman Catholic Church, 6 from Jehovah's Witnesses, 3 from Christian Congregations in Slovakia, 2 from Other, 1 from Paganism and natural spirituality, 1 from Not found out and 1 from Evangelical Church.
