= Stuľany =

- Municipality
- Flag

- Location of Stuľany in the Prešov Region Location of Stuľany in Slovakia
- Coordinates: 49.15°N 21.40°E
- Country: Slovakia
- Region: Prešov Region
- District: Bardejov District
- First mentioned: 1420

Area
  - Total: 8.11 km^{2} (3.13 sq mi)
- Elevation: 220 m (720 ft)

Population (2025)
  - Total: 538
- Time zone: UTC+1 (CET)
  - Summer (DST): UTC+2 (CEST)
- Postal code: 864 5
- Area code: +421 54
- Vehicle registration plate (until 2022): BJ
- Website: www.obecstulany.sk

Stuľany is a village and municipality in Bardejov District in the Prešov Region of north-east Slovakia.

== History ==
In historical records the village was first mentioned in 1420

== Geography ==
The municipality lies at an altitude of 220 metres (720 ft) and covers an area of 8.11 km^{2} (3.13 sq mi) (2025).

== Population ==
Population statistic (10 years)
Year	1995	2005	2015	2025
Count	609	597	567	538
Difference		−1.97%	−5.02%	−5.11%

Population statistic
Year	2024	2025
Count	545	538
Difference		−1.28%

It has a population of 538 people (31 December 2025).

=== Ethnicity ===
Census 2021 (1+ %)
Ethnicity	Number	Fraction
Slovak	552	99.81%
Total	553	

In year 2021 was 553 people by ethnicity 552 as Slovak, 4 as Other, 2 as German, 1 as Czech and 1 as Not found out.

Note on population: The difference values of population numbers in the table "Population statistic" and in the sections "Ethnicity" & "Religion" is caused by the use of various statistical methods.

=== Religion ===
Census 2021 (1+ %)
Religion	Number	Fraction
Roman Catholic Church	458	82.82%
Evangelical Church	62	11.21%
None	13	2.35%
Greek Catholic Church	9	1.63%
Church of the Brethren	7	1.27%
Total	553	

In year 2021 was 553 people by religion 458 from Roman Catholic Church, 62 from Evangelical Church, 13 from None, 9 from Greek Catholic Church, 7 from Church of the Brethren, 2 from Not found out and 2 from Ad hoc movements.
