= Lipová, Bardejov District =

Lipová
- Municipality
- Flag

- Location of Lipová in the Prešov Region Location of Lipová in Slovakia
- Coordinates: 49.25°N 21.48°E
- Country: Slovakia
- Region: Prešov Region
- District: Bardejov District
- First mentioned: 1567

Area
  - Total: 3.91 km^{2} (1.51 sq mi)
- Elevation: 286 m (938 ft)

Population (2025)
  - Total: 79
- Time zone: UTC+1 (CET)
  - Summer (DST): UTC+2 (CEST)
- Postal code: 861 3
- Area code: +421 54
- Vehicle registration plate (until 2022): BJ

Lipová (Rusyn: Липова) is a village and small municipality in Bardejov District in the Prešov Region of north-east Slovakia.

== History ==
In historical records the village was first mentioned in 1567.

== Geography ==
The municipality lies at an altitude of 286 metres (938 ft) and covers an area of 3.91 km^{2} (1.51 sq mi) (2025).

== Population ==
Population statistic (10 years)
Year	1995	2005	2015	2025
Count	104	99	73	79
Difference		−4.80%	−26.26%	+8.21%

Population statistic
Year	2024	2025
Count	83	79
Difference		−4.81%

It has a population of 79 people (31 December 2025).

=== Ethnicity ===
Census 2021 (1+ %)
Ethnicity	Number	Fraction
Slovak	68	97.14%
Rusyn	21	30%
Romani	6	8.57%
Ukrainian	1	1.42%
Not found out	1	1.42%
Total	70	

In year 2021 was 70 people by ethnicity 68 as Slovak, 21 as Rusyn, 6 as Romani, 1 as Ukrainian and 1 as Not found out.

Note on population: The difference values of population numbers in the table "Population statistic" and in the sections "Ethnicity" & "Religion" is caused by the use of various statistical methods.

=== Religion ===
Census 2021 (1+ %)
Religion	Number	Fraction
Greek Catholic Church	59	84.29%
Roman Catholic Church	8	11.43%
Eastern Orthodox Church	1	1.43%
Not found out	1	1.43%
Buddhism	1	1.43%
Total	70	

In year 2021 was 70 people by religion 59 from Greek Catholic Church, 8 from Roman Catholic Church, 1 from Eastern Orthodox Church, 1 from Not found out and 1 from Buddhism.
