= Tročany =

- Municipality
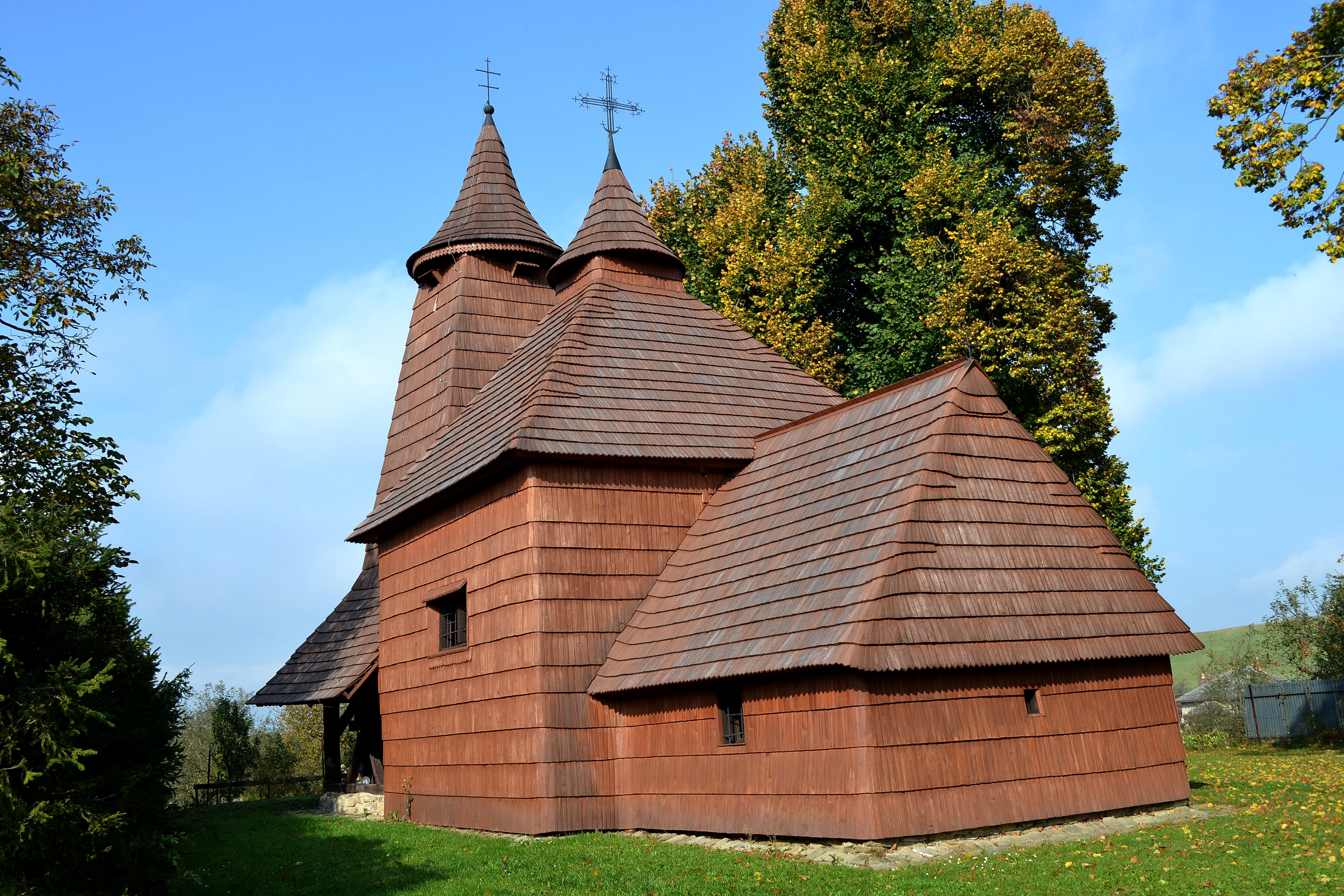
- Wooden church in village

- Flag

- Location of Tročany in the Prešov Region Location of Tročany in Slovakia
- Coordinates: 49.18°N 21.32°E
- Country: Slovakia
- Region: Prešov Region
- District: Bardejov District
- First mentioned: 1270

Area
  - Total: 8.47 km^{2} (3.27 sq mi)
- Elevation: 350 m (1,150 ft)

Population (2025)
  - Total: 301
- Time zone: UTC+1 (CET)
  - Summer (DST): UTC+2 (CEST)
- Postal code: 864 1
- Area code: +421 54
- Vehicle registration plate (until 2022): BJ
- Website: www.trocany.eu

Tročany (Hungarian Trocsány) is a village and municipality in Bardejov District in the Prešov Region of north-east Slovakia.

== History ==
In historical records the village, which was part of the Kingdom of Hungary until 1920, was first mentioned in 1270.

The wooden Greek Catholic Church of St. Luke the Evangelist was constructed in 1739, on the site of a church erected in 1338. It contains a large iconostasis with many 17th century icons painted on canvas.

== Geography ==
The municipality lies at an altitude of 350 metres (1,150 ft) and covers an area of 8.47 km^{2} (3.27 sq mi) (2025).

== Population ==
Population statistic (10 years)
Year	1995	2005	2015	2025
Count	303	314	292	301
Difference		+3.63%	−7.00%	+3.08%

Population statistic
Year	2024	2025
Count	292	301
Difference		+3.08%

It has a population of 301 people (31 December 2025).

=== Ethnicity ===
Census 2021 (1+ %)
Ethnicity	Number	Fraction
Slovak	278	97.88%
Not found out	9	3.16%
Total	284	

In year 2021 was 284 people by ethnicity 278 as Slovak, 9 as Not found out and 1 as Rusyn.

Note on population: The difference values of population numbers in the table "Population statistic" and in the sections "Ethnicity" & "Religion" is caused by the use of various statistical methods.

=== Religion ===
Census 2021 (1+ %)
Religion	Number	Fraction
Roman Catholic Church	257	90.49%
None	12	4.23%
Greek Catholic Church	9	3.17%
Not found out	6	2.11%
Total	284	

In year 2021 was 284 people by religion 257 from Roman Catholic Church, 12 from None, 9 from Greek Catholic Church and 6 from Not found out.
