= Smilno =

- Municipality
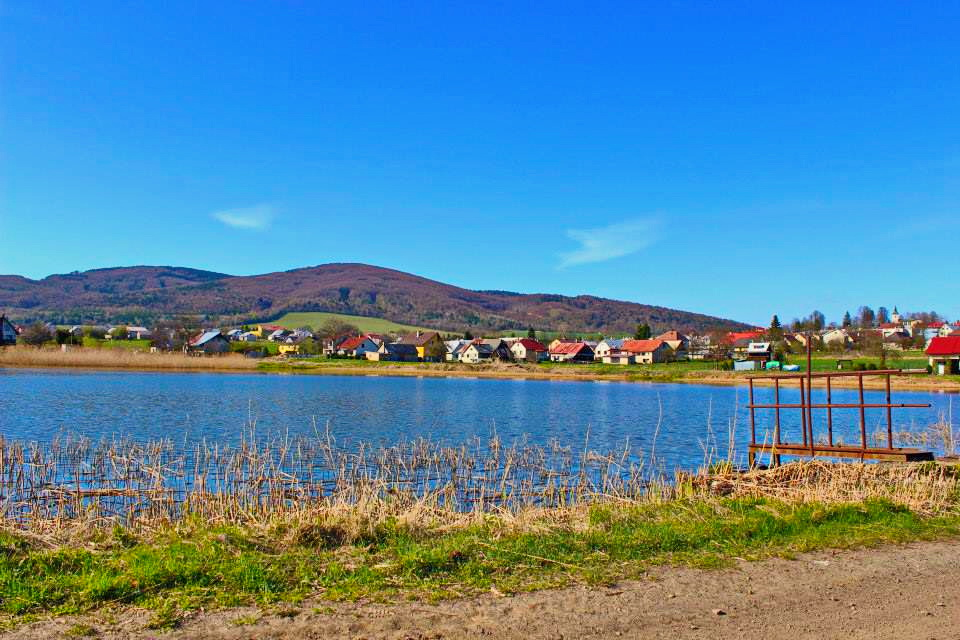

- Flag

- Location of Smilno in the Prešov Region Location of Smilno in Slovakia
- Coordinates: 49.38°N 21.35°E
- Country: Slovakia
- Region: Prešov Region
- District: Bardejov District
- First mentioned: 1250

Area
  - Total: 13.80 km^{2} (5.33 sq mi)
- Elevation: 413 m (1,355 ft)

Population (2025)
  - Total: 704
- Time zone: UTC+1 (CET)
  - Summer (DST): UTC+2 (CEST)
- Postal code: 863 3
- Area code: +421 54
- Vehicle registration plate (until 2022): BJ
- Website: www.smilno.sk

Smilno is a village and municipality in Bardejov District in the Prešov Region of north-east Slovakia.

== History ==
In historical records, the village was first mentioned in 1250.

== Geography ==
The municipality lies at an altitude of 413 metres (1,355 ft) and covers an area of 13.80 km^{2} (5.33 sq mi) (2025).

== Population ==
Population statistic (10 years)
| Year | 1995 | 2005 | 2015 | 2025 |
|---|---|---|---|---|
| Count | 712 | 729 | 702 | 704 |
| Difference | | +2.38% | −3.70% | +0.28% |

Population statistic
| Year | 2024 | 2025 |
|---|---|---|
| Count | 691 | 704 |
| Difference | | +1.88% |

It has a population of 704 people (31 December 2025).

=== Ethnicity ===
Census 2021 (1+ %)
| Ethnicity | Number | Fraction |
|---|---|---|
| Slovak | 664 | 97.93% |
| Rusyn | 29 | 4.27% |
| Total | 678 | |

In year 2021 was 678 people by ethnicity 664 as Slovak, 29 as Rusyn, 6 as Not found out, 3 as Czech, 3 as Polish, 2 as Ukrainian, 1 as Moravian and 1 as English.

Note on population: The difference values of population numbers in the table "Population statistic" and in the sections "Ethnicity" & "Religion" is caused by the use of various statistical methods.

=== Religion ===
Census 2021 (1+ %)
| Religion | Number | Fraction |
|---|---|---|
| Roman Catholic Church | 601 | 88.64% |
| Greek Catholic Church | 39 | 5.75% |
| None | 22 | 3.24% |
| Eastern Orthodox Church | 9 | 1.33% |
| Total | 678 | |

In year 2021 was 678 people by religion 601 from Roman Catholic Church, 39 from Greek Catholic Church, 22 from None, 9 from Eastern Orthodox Church, 2 from Not found out, 2 from Evangelical Church, 1 from Other and not ascertained christian church, 1 from Other and 1 from Apostolic Church.
