= Brezovka =

- Municipality
- Location of Brezovka in the Prešov Region Location of Brezovka in Slovakia
- Coordinates: 49°16′N 21°25′E
- Country: Slovakia
- Region: Prešov
- District: Bardejov
- First mentioned: 1572

Area
  - Total: 3.26 km^{2} (1.26 sq mi)
- Elevation: 346 m (1,135 ft)

Population (2025)
  - Total: 110
  - Density: 4.72/km^{2} (12.23/sq mi)
- Time zone: UTC+1 (CET)
  - Summer (DST): UTC+2 (CEST)
- Postal code: 086 11
- Area code: +421 54
- Vehicle registration plate (until 2022): BJ
- Website: www.brezovka.eu

Brezovka (Hungarian: Berezóka, Rusyn: Брезівка, romanized: Brezivka) is a village and municipality in Bardejov District in the Prešov Region of north-east Slovakia.

== History ==
In historical records, the village was first mentioned in 1572.

== Geography ==
The municipality lies at an altitude of 346 metres (1,135 ft) and covers an area of 3.26 km^{2} (1.26 sq mi) (2025).

== Population ==
Population statistic (10 years)
Year	1995	2005	2015	2025
Count	110	110	116	110
Difference		−1.42%	+5.45%	−5.17%

Population statistic
Year	2024	2025
Count	112	110
Difference		−1.78%

It has a population of 110 people (31 December 2025).

=== Ethnicity ===
Census 2021 (1+ %)
Ethnicity	Number	Fraction
Slovak	97	93.26%
Rusyn	8	7.69%
Not found out	7	6.73%
Total	104	

In year 2021 was 104 people by ethnicity 97 as Slovak, 8 as Rusyn and 7 as Not found out.

Note on population: The difference values of population numbers in the table "Population statistic" and in the sections "Ethnicity" & "Religion" is caused by the use of various statistical methods.

=== Religion ===
Census 2021 (1+ %)
Religion	Number	Fraction
Roman Catholic Church	56	53.85%
Greek Catholic Church	24	23.08%
None	9	8.65%
Eastern Orthodox Church	6	5.77%
Not found out	6	5.77%
Evangelical Church	3	2.88%
Total	104	

In year 2021 was 104 people by religion 56 from Roman Catholic Church, 24 from Greek Catholic Church, 9 from None, 6 from Eastern Orthodox Church, 6 from Not found out and 3 from Evangelical Church.

== See also ==
- List of municipalities and towns in Slovakia
