= Jedlinka =

- Municipality
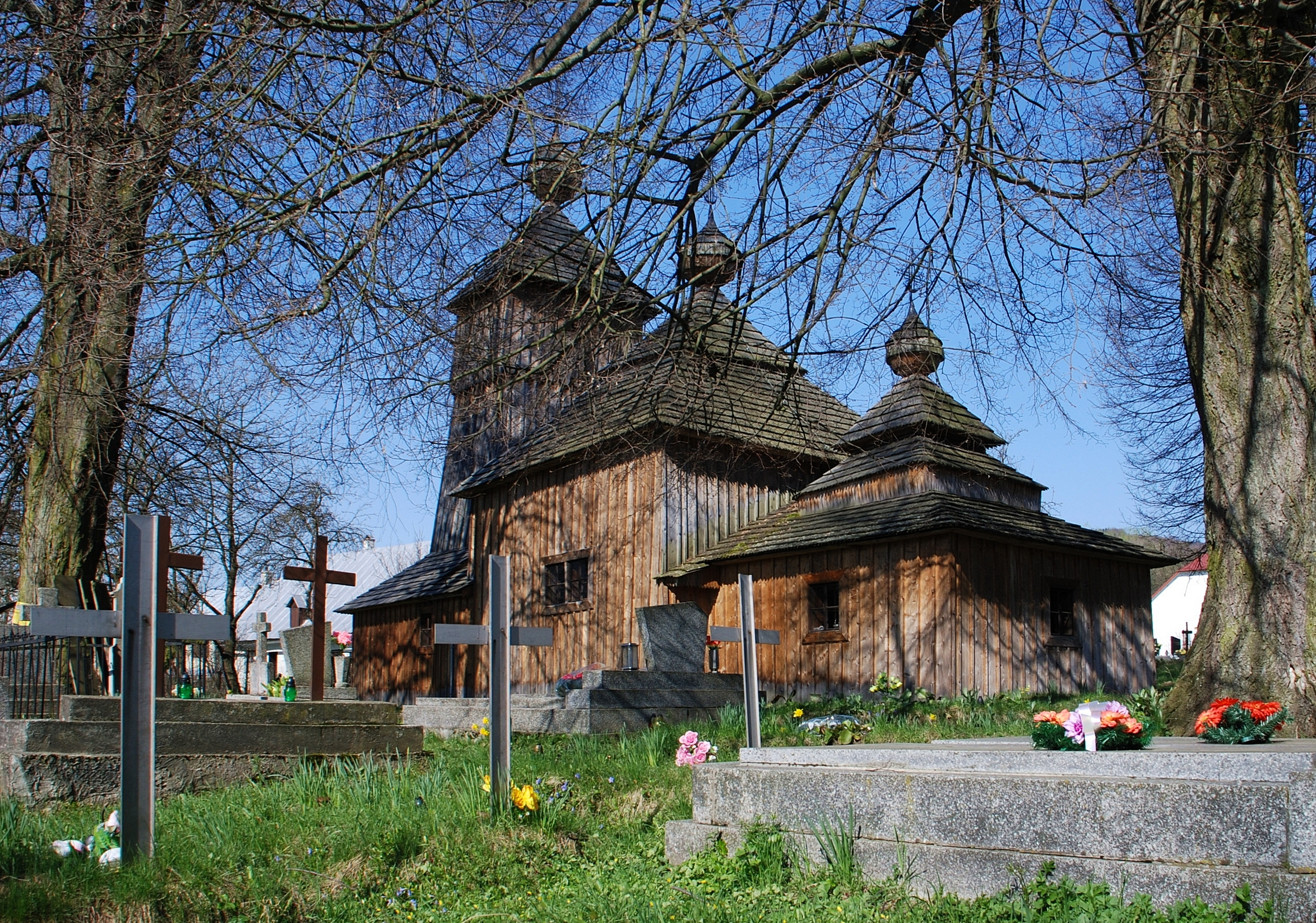
- Wooden church in village

- Flag Coat of arms

- Location of Jedlinka in the Prešov Region Location of Jedlinka in Slovakia
- Coordinates: 49.40°N 21.37°E
- Country: Slovakia
- Region: Prešov Region
- District: Bardejov District
- First mentioned: 1567

Area
  - Total: 4.55 km^{2} (1.76 sq mi)
- Elevation: 405 m (1,329 ft)

Population (2025)
  - Total: 82
- Time zone: UTC+1 (CET)
  - Summer (DST): UTC+2 (CEST)
- Postal code: 863 6
- Area code: +421 54
- Vehicle registration plate (until 2022): BJ
- Website: www.obecjedlinka.sk

Jedlinka (Hungarian: Borókás, Rusyn: Ялинкы) is a village and small municipality in Bardejov District in the Prešov Region of north-east Slovakia.

== History ==
The village was first mentioned in historical records in 1567 and belonged to the Szimary family in the 19th century. Prior to the Treaty of Trianon, it was part of Sáros county.

== Geography ==
The municipality lies at an altitude of 405 metres (1,329 ft) and covers an area of 4.55 km^{2} (1.76 sq mi) (2025).

== Population ==
Population statistic (10 years)
Year	1995	2005	2015	2025
Count	105	79	90	82
Difference		−24.76%	+13.92%	−8.88%

Population statistic
Year	2024	2025
Count	85	82
Difference		−3.52%

It has a population of 82 people (31 December 2025).

=== Ethnicity ===
Census 2021 (1+ %)
Ethnicity	Number	Fraction
Slovak	65	81.25%
Rusyn	28	35%
Czech	1	1.25%
Ukrainian	1	1.25%
Not found out	1	1.25%
Total	80	

In year 2021 was 80 people by ethnicity 65 as Slovak, 28 as Rusyn, 1 as Czech, 1 as Ukrainian and 1 as Not found out.

Note on population: The difference values of population numbers in the table "Population statistic" and in the sections "Ethnicity" & "Religion" is caused by the use of various statistical methods.

=== Religion ===
Census 2021 (1+ %)
Religion	Number	Fraction
Greek Catholic Church	31	38.75%
Eastern Orthodox Church	21	26.25%
Roman Catholic Church	15	18.75%
None	7	8.75%
Apostolic Church	3	3.75%
Not found out	1	1.25%
Other	1	1.25%
Evangelical Church	1	1.25%
Total	80	

In year 2021 was 80 people by religion 31 from Greek Catholic Church, 21 from Eastern Orthodox Church, 15 from Roman Catholic Church, 7 from None, 3 from Apostolic Church, 1 from Not found out, 1 from Other and 1 from Evangelical Church.

== Genealogical resources ==
The records for genealogical research are available at the state archive "Statny Archiv in Presov, Slovakia"

- Roman Catholic church records (births/marriages/deaths): 1695-1895 (parish B)
- Greek Catholic church records (births/marriages/deaths): 1798-1895 (parish B)

== See also ==
- List of municipalities and towns in Slovakia
