= Frička =

- Municipality
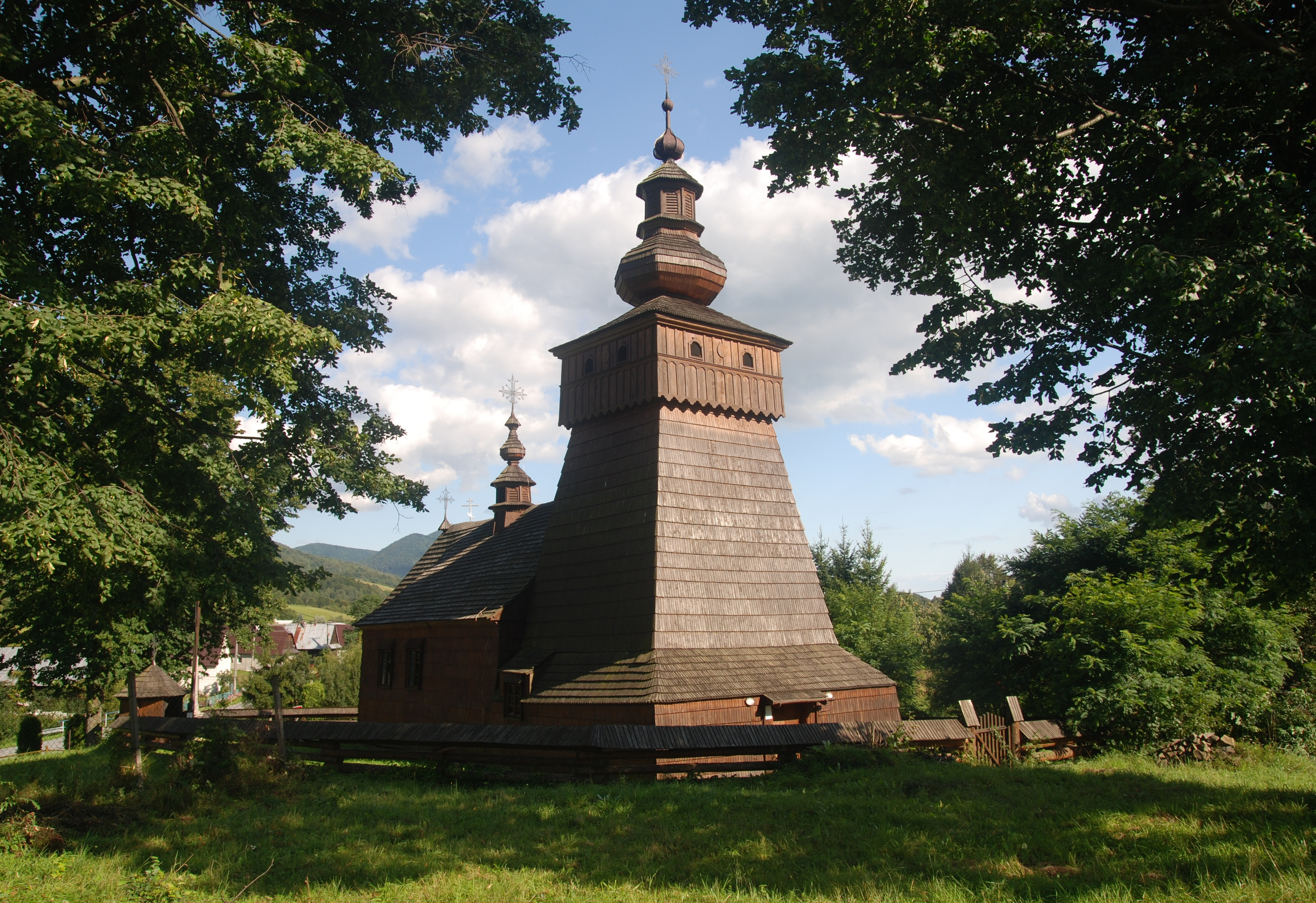
- Wooden church in village

- Flag

- Location of Frička in the Prešov Region Location of Frička in Slovakia
- Coordinates: 49.40°N 21.09°E
- Country: Slovakia
- Region: Prešov Region
- District: Bardejov District
- First mentioned: 1618

Area
  - Total: 8.27 km^{2} (3.19 sq mi)
- Elevation: 514 m (1,686 ft)

Population (2025)
  - Total: 342
- Time zone: UTC+1 (CET)
  - Summer (DST): UTC+2 (CEST)
- Postal code: 860 2
- Area code: +421 54
- Vehicle registration plate (until 2022): BJ

Frička is a village and municipality in Bardejov District in the Prešov Region of north-east Slovakia.

== History ==
In historical records the village was first mentioned in 1618.

== Geography ==
The municipality lies at an altitude of 514 metres (1,686 ft) and covers an area of 8.27 km^{2} (3.19 sq mi) (2025).

== Population ==
Population statistic (10 years)
Year	1995	2005	2015	2025
Count	220	263	326	342
Difference		+19.54%	+23.95%	+4.90%

Population statistic
Year	2024	2025
Count	337	342
Difference		+1.48%

It has a population of 342 people (31 December 2025).

=== Ethnicity ===
Census 2021 (1+ %)
Ethnicity	Number	Fraction
Slovak	273	82.72%
Romani	92	27.87%
Rusyn	53	16.06%
Not found out	14	4.24%
Ukrainian	7	2.12%
Total	330	

In year 2021 was 330 people by ethnicity 273 as Slovak, 92 as Romani, 53 as Rusyn, 14 as Not found out, 7 as Ukrainian and 1 as Polish.

Note on population: The difference values of population numbers in the table "Population statistic" and in the sections "Ethnicity" & "Religion" is caused by the use of various statistical methods.

=== Religion ===
Census 2021 (1+ %)
Religion	Number	Fraction
Eastern Orthodox Church	217	65.76%
Greek Catholic Church	56	16.97%
None	28	8.48%
Roman Catholic Church	18	5.45%
Not found out	7	2.12%
Evangelical Church	4	1.21%
Total	330	

In year 2021 was 330 people by religion 217 from Eastern Orthodox Church, 56 from Greek Catholic Church, 28 from None, 18 from Roman Catholic Church, 7 from Not found out and 4 from Evangelical Church.

== Genealogical resources ==
The records for genealogical research are available at the state archive "Statny Archiv in Presov, Slovakia"

- Roman Catholic church records (births/marriages/deaths): 1800-1895 (parish B)
- Greek Catholic church records (births/marriages/deaths): 1781-1899 (parish B)

== See also ==
- List of municipalities and towns in Slovakia
