= Town Hall Square (Bardejov) =

Public square in Bardejov, Slovakia

Coordinates: 49°17′36″N 21°16′33″E

- Public Square
- Radničné Námestie
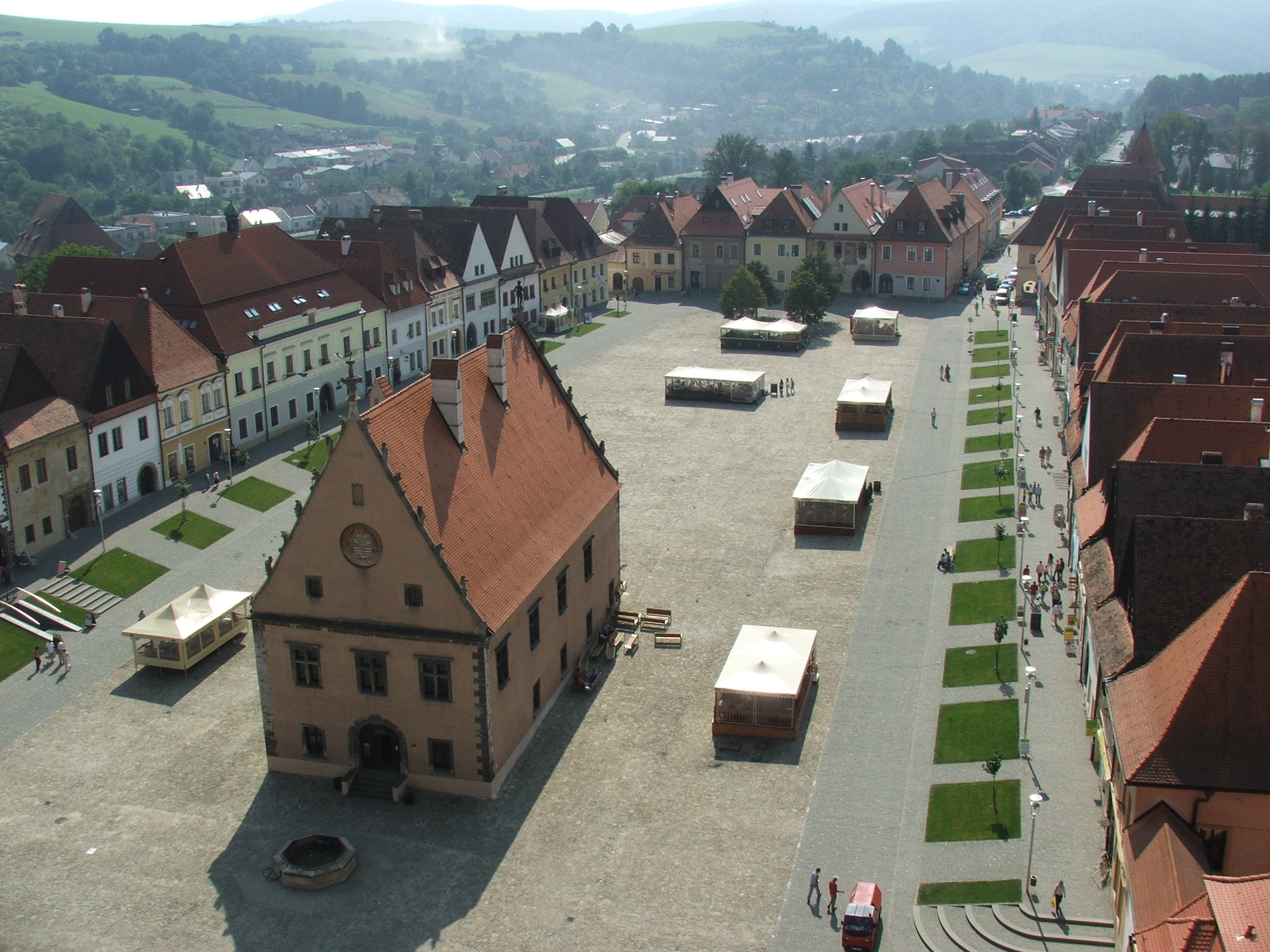
- The Town Hall Square (Radničné námestie) in Bardejov
- Location: Bardejov, Slovakia
- Interactive map of Town Hall Square

Town Hall Square (Slovak: Radničné Námestie) is a public open town square in Bardejov, Slovakia. The town square, which used to be the town's medieval marketplace, is surrounded by well-preserved Gothic and Renaissance burghers’ houses as well as the basilica. Nowadays, the Town Hall is a national cultural monument and also part of the UNESCO World Heritage Site.

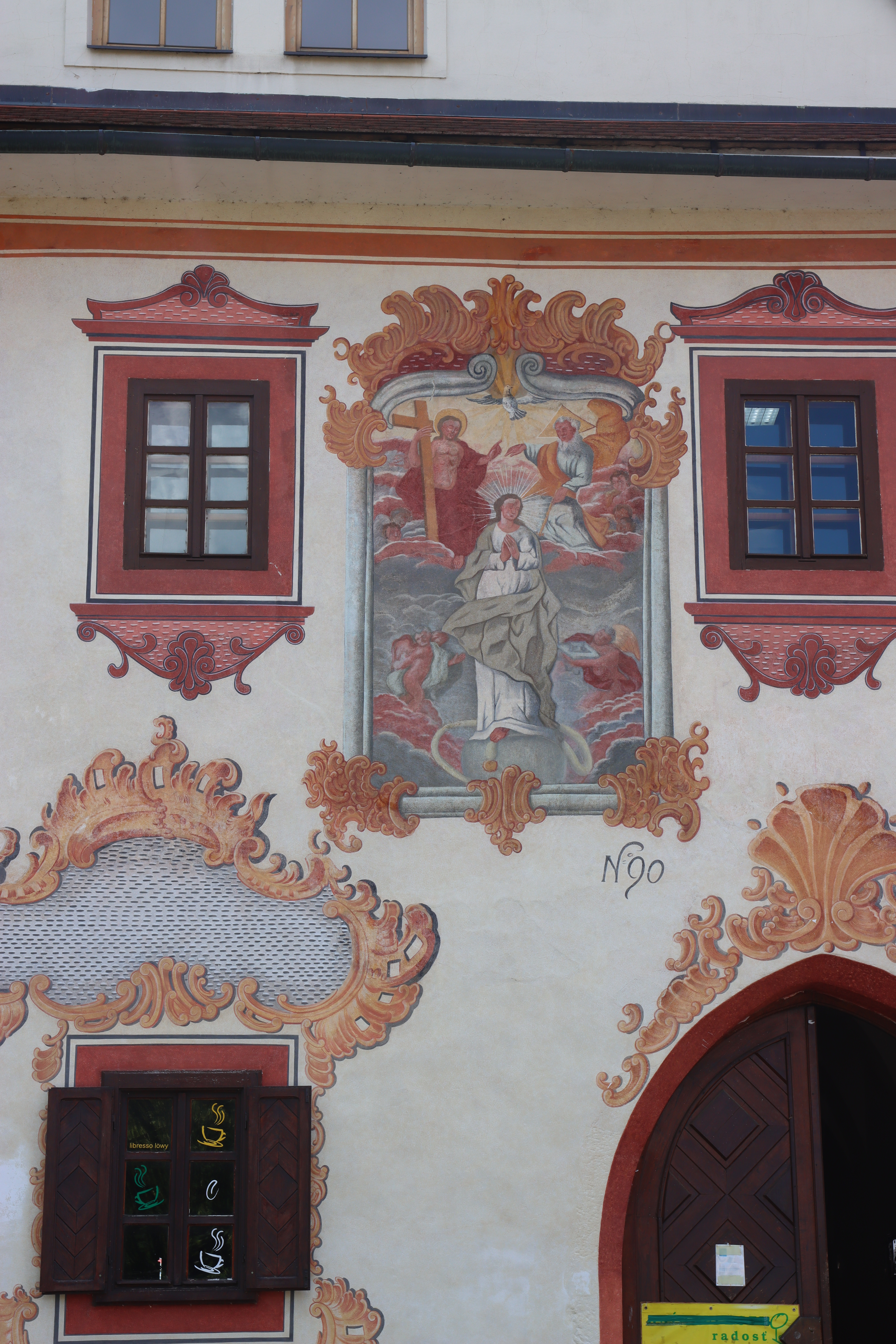
Paintings on house no. 26, depicts the Coronation of Virgin Mary.

== Buildings and structures ==
=== Šariš Museum ===
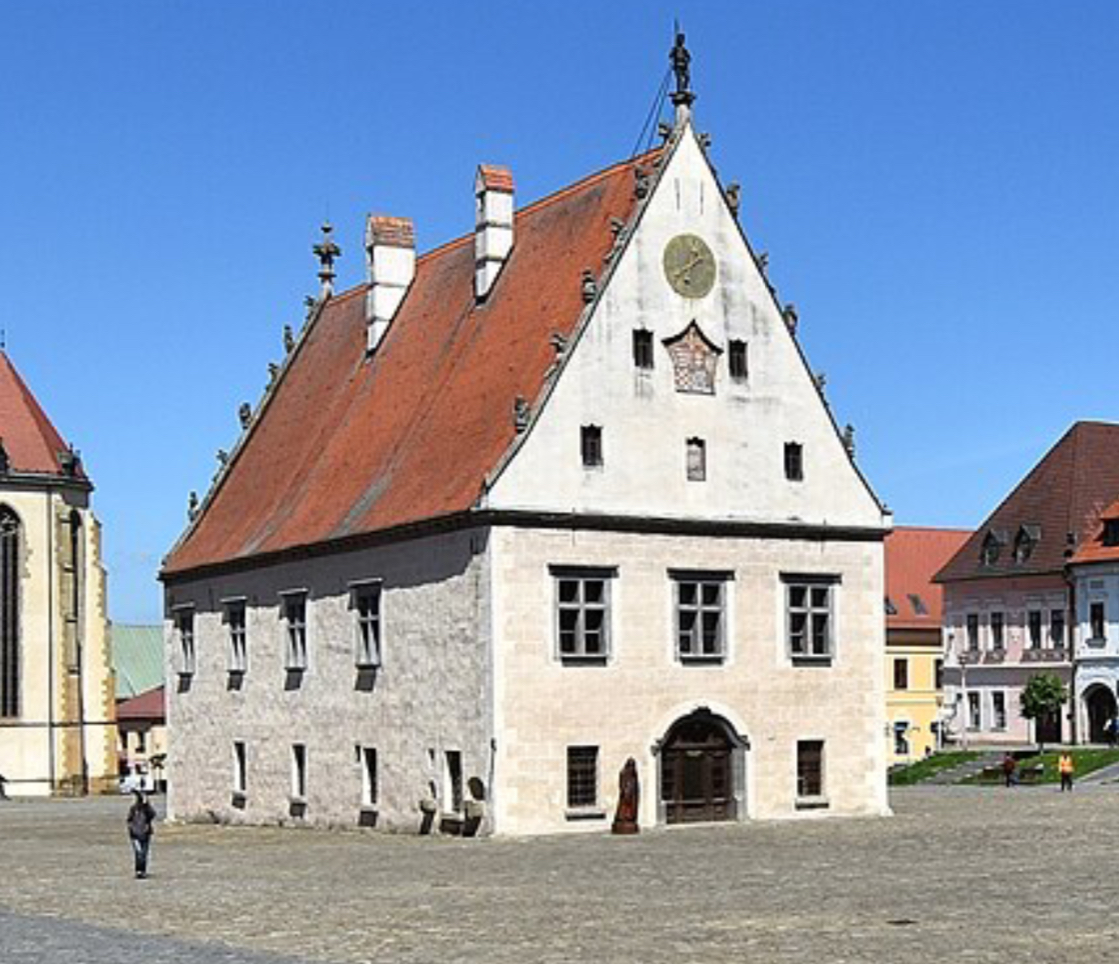
Šariš Museum (also known as the Town Hall) in 2024.

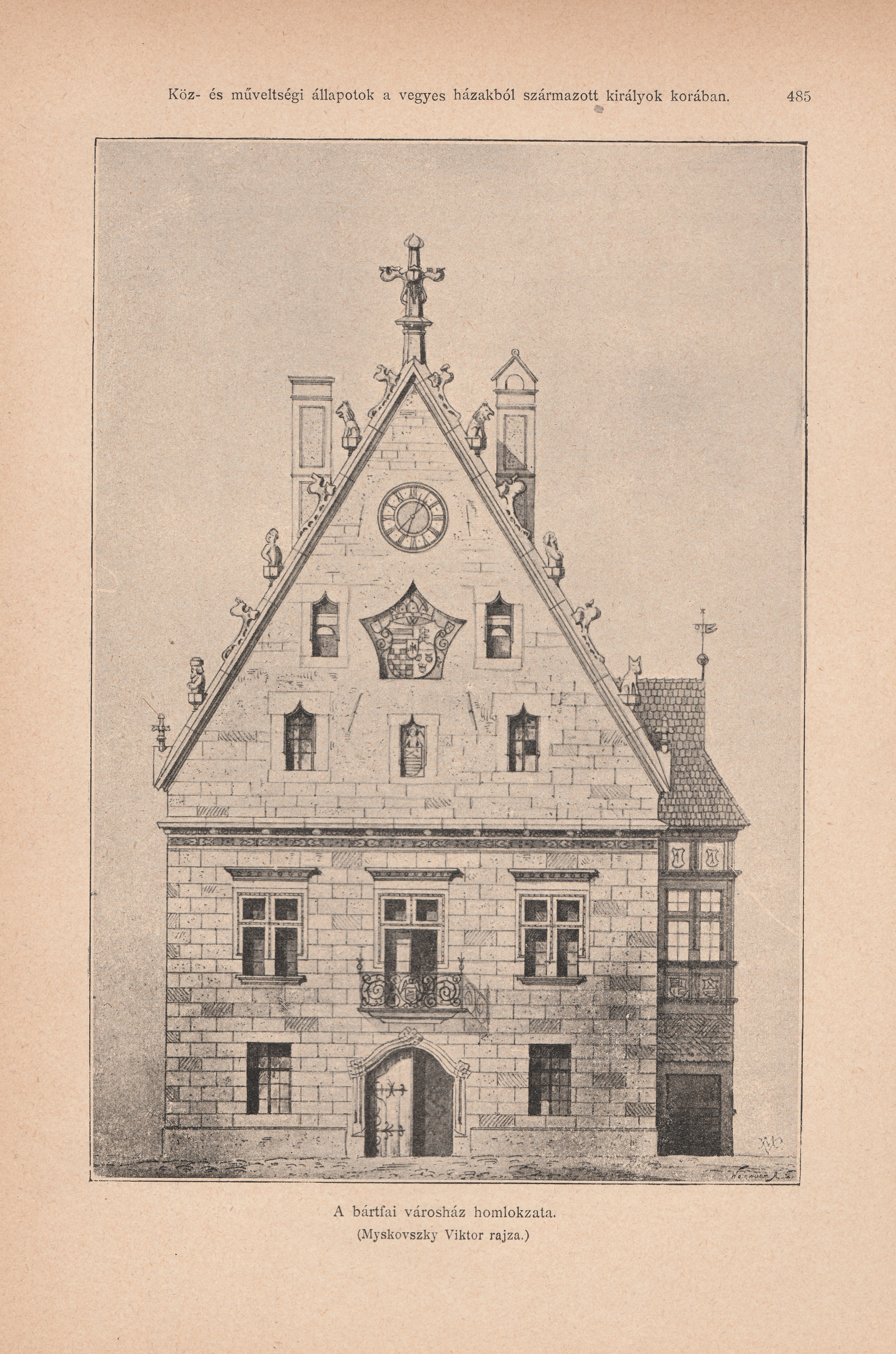
An illustration of what the museum might have looked like in 1896.

=== Basilica of St Giles ===
The Basilica of St Giles is a Gothic religious building, which is situated in the northern part of the Town Hall Square.

=== Socha Kata (bronze statue) ===
Socha Kata is a 190 cm tall statue of an executioner holding an axe in front of the town hall and the Basilica of St. Giles. Nearby is the Executioner's House, where the executioner lived and had his own bench in the church. The statue was created by father and son sculptors Martin and Viktor Kutný, who also co-financed it with the city of Bardejov. Socha Kata was unveiled on 4 July 2016.

== Gallery ==
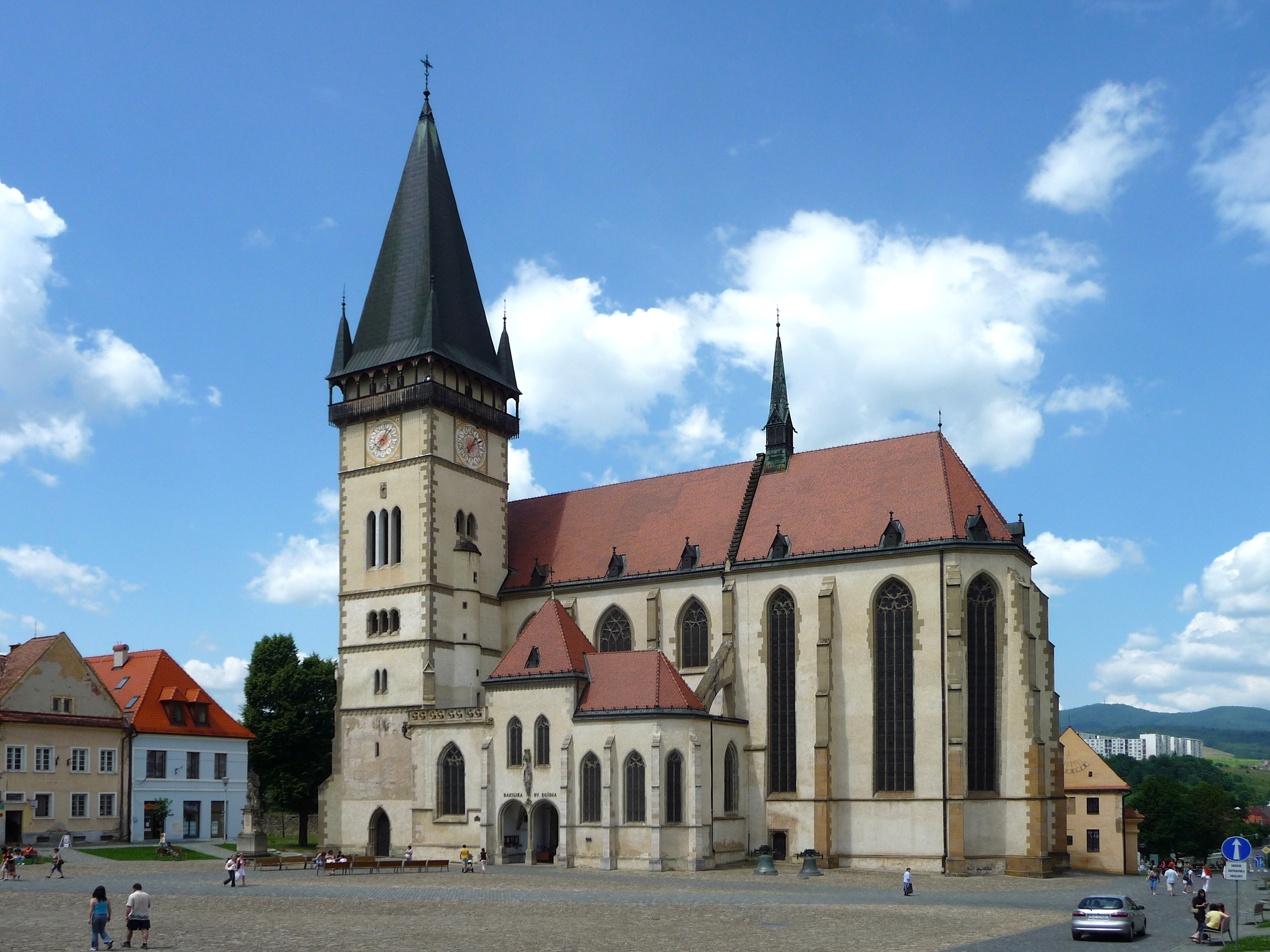
Basilica of St Giles

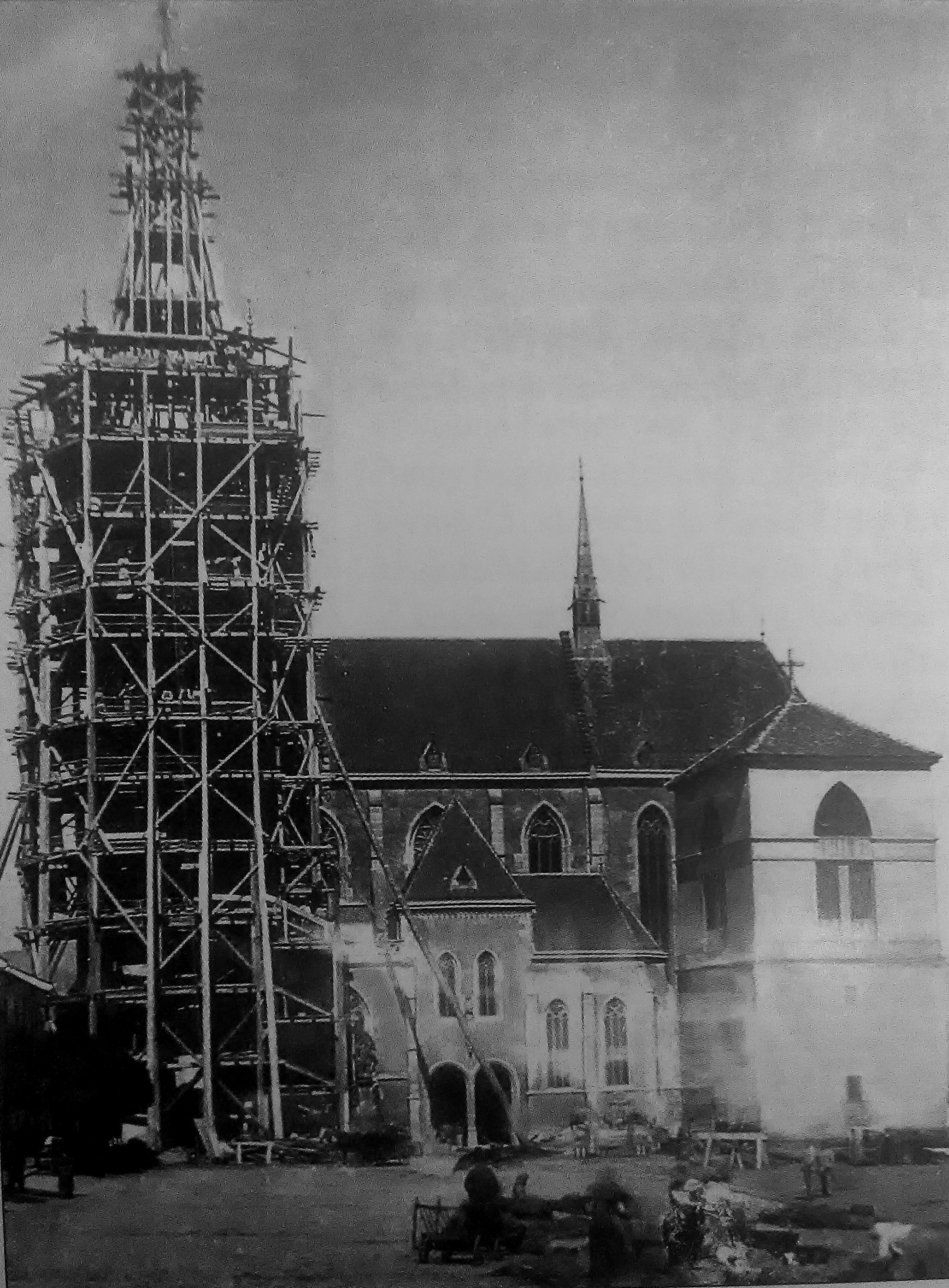
Reconstruction of the basilica's spire

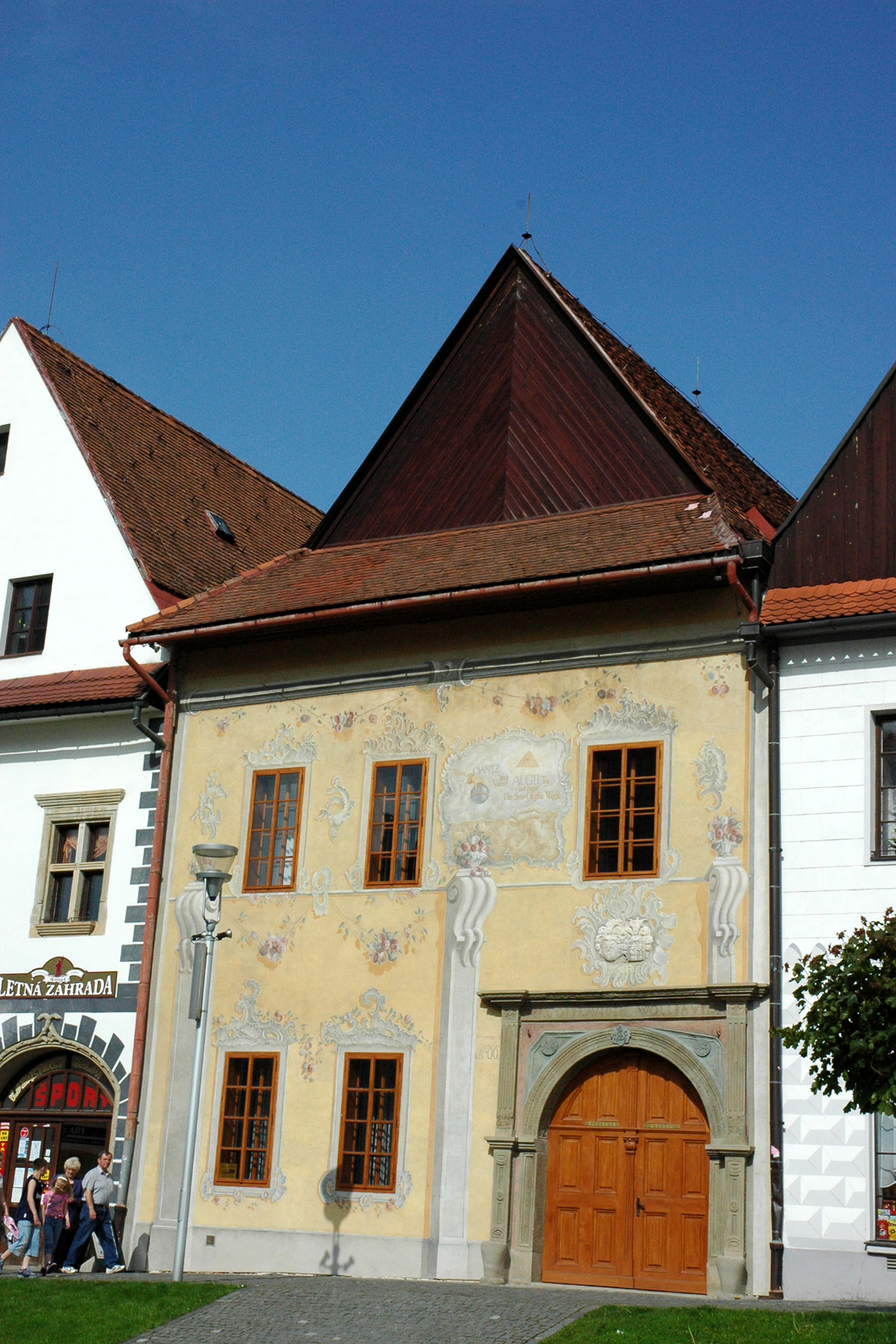
The Burgher house

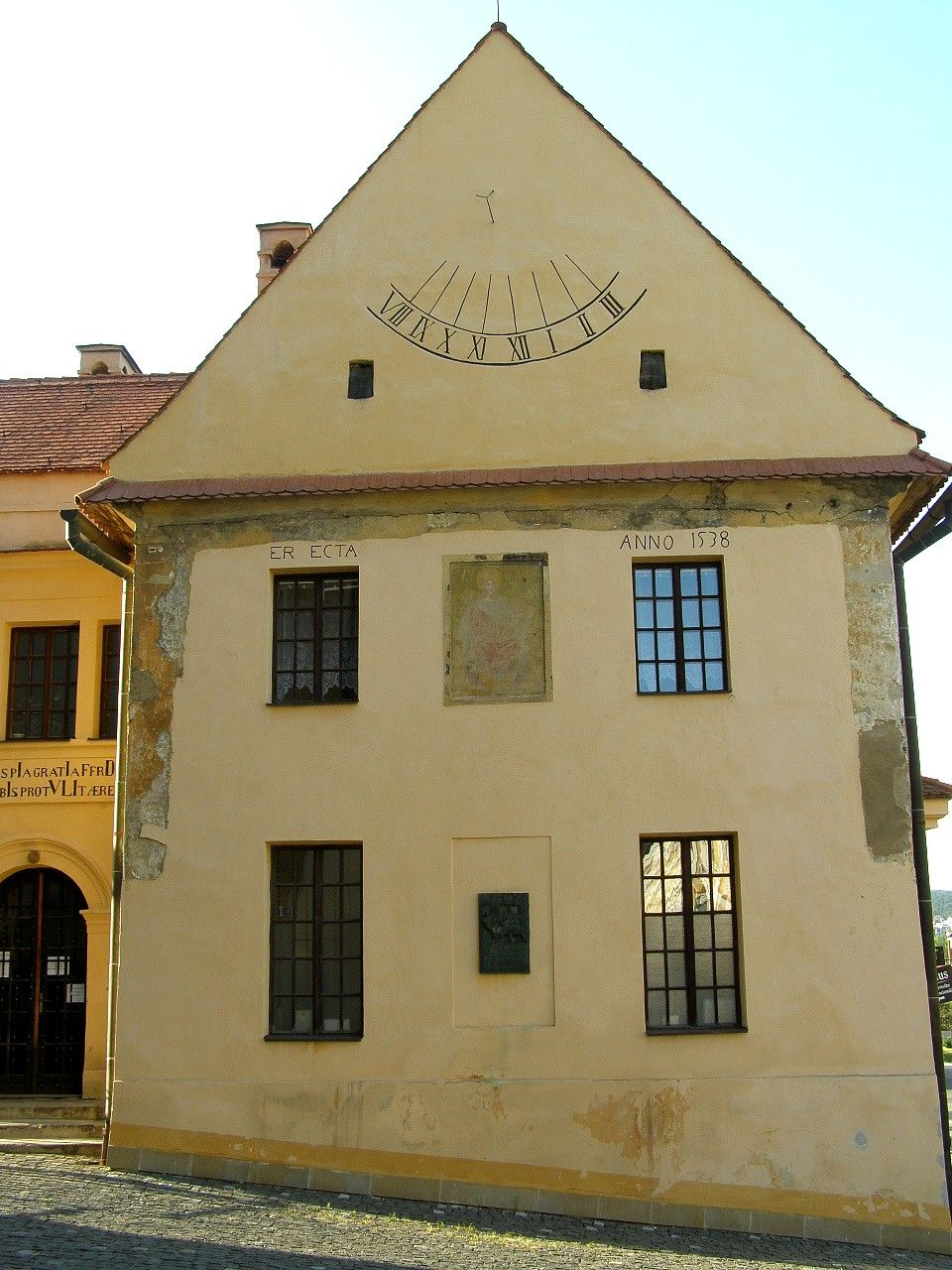
Humanistic Gymnasium

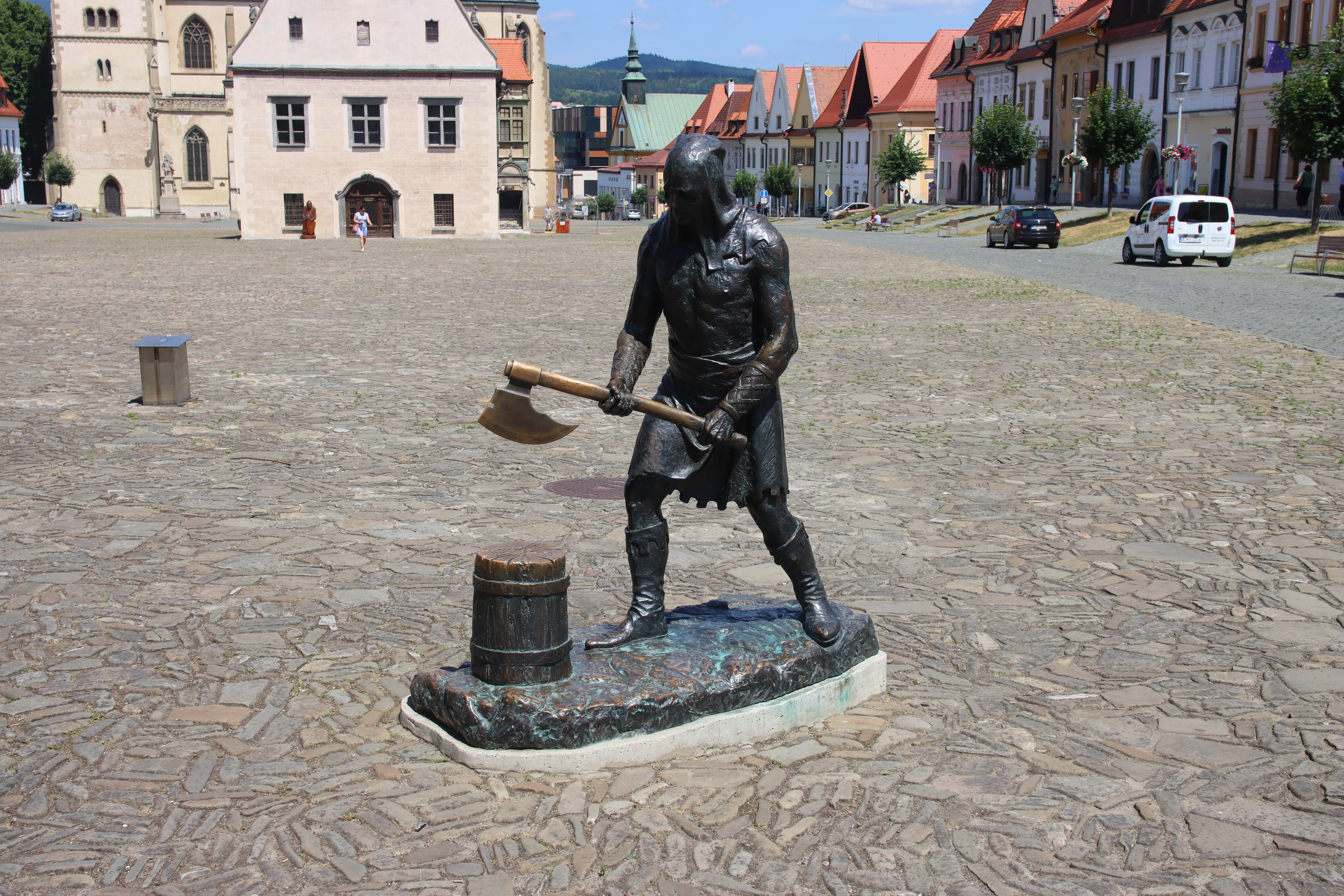
The statue in 2022

== See also ==
- List of city squares
- List of town squares by size
