= Battle of Bardejov =

Battle of Bardejov (Polish: Bitwa pod Bardiowem) was a battle between the Polish king Władysław II Jagiełło and king Sigismund of Hungary and Croatia, later crowned as King of Germany, King of Bohemia and Holy Roman Emperor. The battle took place on October 1410 in Bardejov and ended with a Jagiełło victory.
