= Bardejov =

Town in Slovakia

- Town
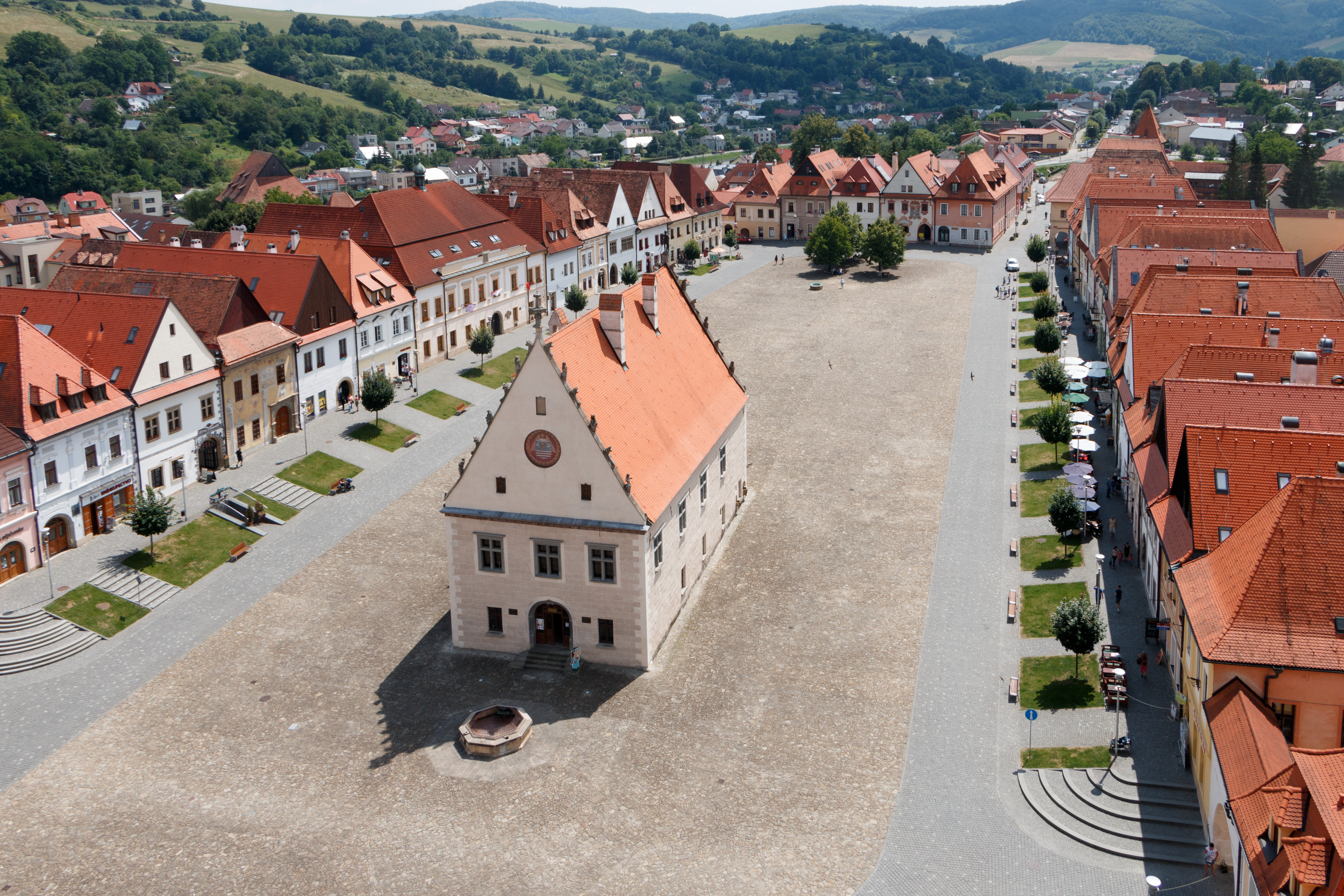
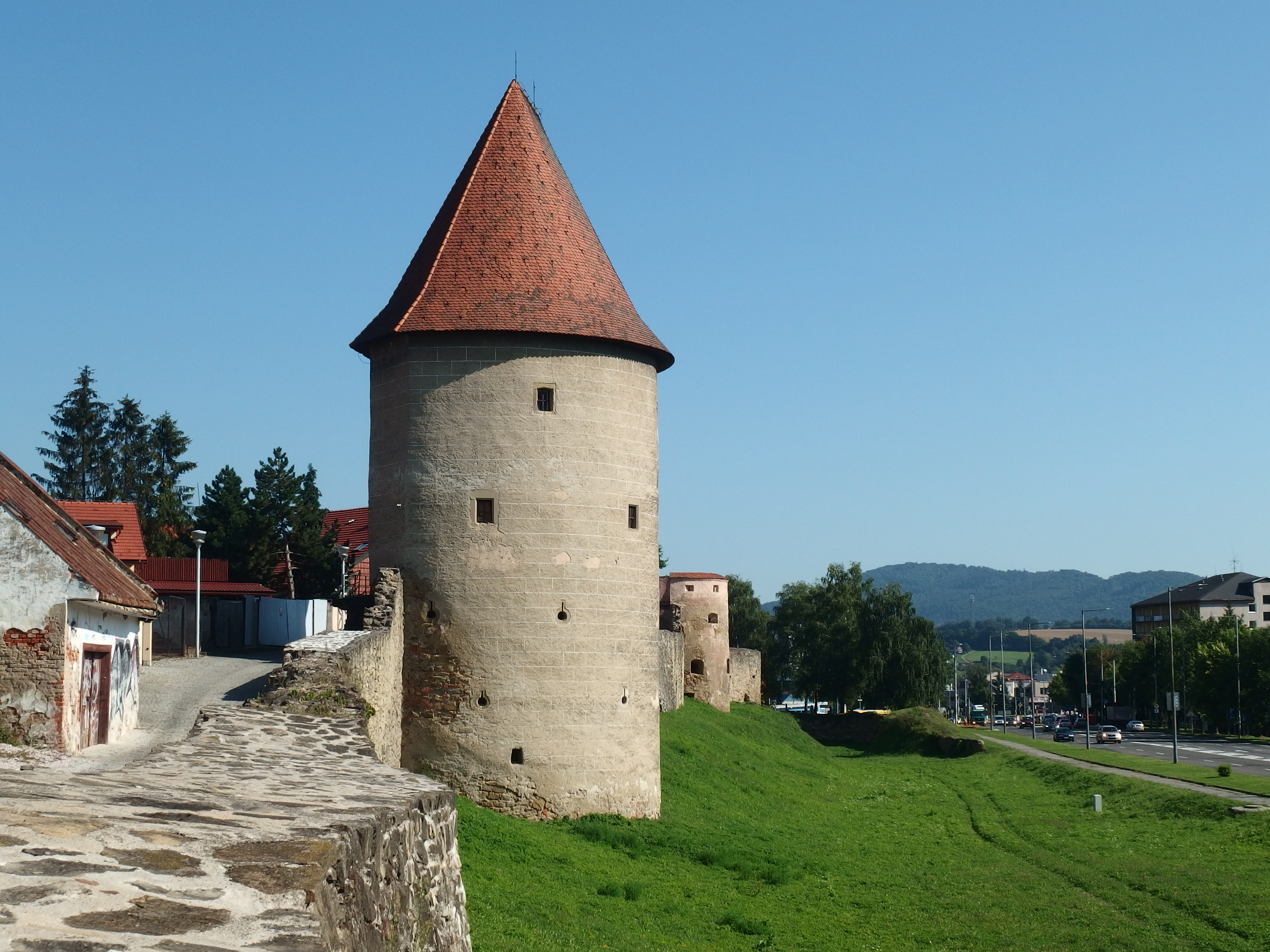
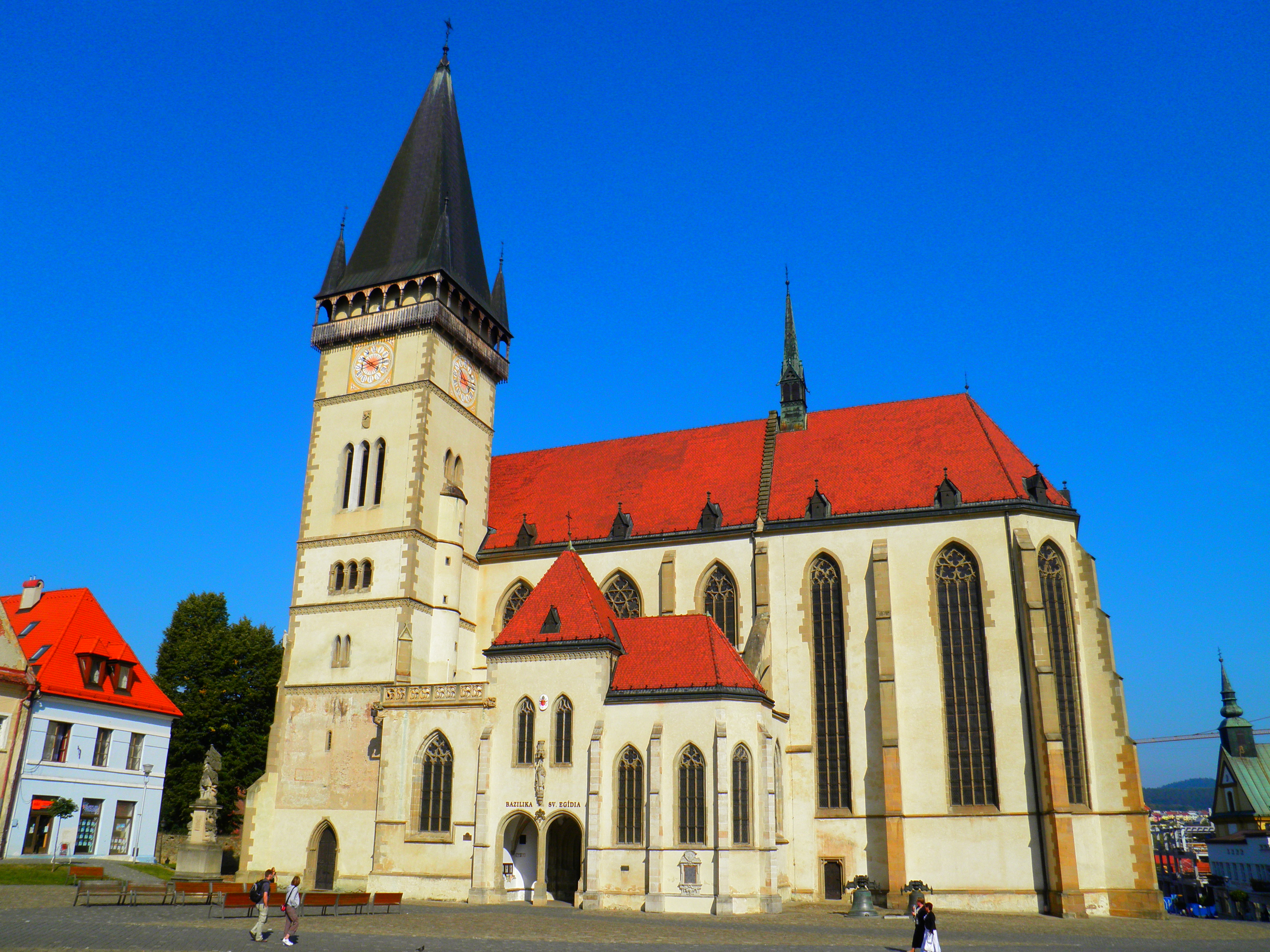
- From the top, The Town Hall Square (Radničné námestie) in Bardejov, The Old City Walls, Basilica of St Giles

- Flag Coat of arms

- Location of Bardejov in the Prešov Region Location of Bardejov in Slovakia
- Coordinates: 49°17′36″N 21°16′34″E
- Country: Slovakia
- Region: Prešov
- District: Bardejov
- First mentioned: 1241

Area
  - Total: 72.77 km^{2} (28.10 sq mi)
- (2022)
- Elevation: 323 m (1,060 ft)

Population (2025)
  - Total: 29,495
- Time zone: UTC+1 (CET)
  - Summer (DST): UTC+2 (CEST)
- Postal code: 085 01
- Area code: +421 54
- Vehicle registration plate (until 2022): BJ
- Website: bardejov.sk

UNESCO World Heritage Site
- Official name: Bardejov Town Conservation Reserve
- Criteria: iii, iv
- Reference: 973
- Inscription: 2000 (24th Session)

Bardejov (Hungarian: Bártfa, German: Bartfeld, Rusyn: Бардеёв, Ukrainian: Бардіїв, Polish: Bardejów) is a town in northeastern Slovakia. It is situated in the Šariš region on a floodplain terrace of the Topľa River, in the hills of the Beskyd Mountains. It exhibits numerous cultural monuments in its completely intact medieval town center. The town is one of UNESCO's World Heritage Sites and currently maintains a population of about 32,000 inhabitants.

== Etymology ==
According to one theory, the name town comes from the Hungarian word "bárd" (English: 'chopper, hatchet'), which indicated an amount of forested territory which could be chopped down by one man in one day. In the Hungarian name (Bártfa), the "fa" (English: "tree") suffix came later, and it also changed the last letter of "bárd" to "bárt", for easier pronunciation.

Another theory derives the name from a Christian personal name Barděj, Barduj (abbreviated forms of Bartholomew) with common Slavic possessive suffix -ov. This theory is supported by the first recorded form of the name – Bardujef (1241). The motivation by the personal name is also supported by the presence of the suffix preserved in later Polish or Slovak sources.

== Geography ==
The municipality lies at an altitude of 323 metres (1,060 ft) and covers an area of 72.77 km^{2} (28.10 sq mi) (2025).

== History ==
The present-day city developed from an old Slavic settlement, into which German settlers moved (probably not until the 13th century). However, the first written reference to the town dates back to the 1240s, when monks from Bártfa complained to King Béla IV of Hungary about a violation of the town's borders by Eperjes (today Prešov, Slovakia). By that time, the notable Basilica of St. Giles had already been built.

The town was in the northeast Hungarian majority settlement until the Ottoman wars near the Polish border.

Heavily fortified in the 14th century, the town became a center of trade with Poland. More than 50 guilds controlled the flourishing economy. Bártfa gained the status of a royal town in 1376, later becoming a free royal town. In October 1410 at the Battle of Bardejov the Polish King Władysław II Jagiełło defeated the King Sigismund of Hungary and Croatia, who was later on crowned as King of Germany, King of Bohemia and Holy Roman Emperor.

The town's golden age ended in the 16th century, when several wars, pandemics, and other disasters plagued the country.

Beginning in the first quarter of the 18th century, the situation began to improve. Slovaks and Hasidic Jews came into Bártfa in large numbers. By the end of the century, the population of the town had regained the level of the 16th century. The burghers' houses were rebuilt or modified in keeping with current architectural fashion. A Jewish quarter with a synagogue, slaughterhouse, and ritual baths developed in the north-western suburbs. New churches and bridges were built, as well.

During the Reformation, Michal Radašin was called the town pastor.

Despite further fires in the last quarter of the 19th century, the town continued to thrive, thanks to major industrialization projects in the region. In 1893, a railway was opened connecting Eperjes to Bártfa. However, it declined again following its annexation and the establishment of the first Czechoslovak Republic, and became a backward farming region. World War II saw a worsening in the economic situation, though little damage from bombardment. Bardejov was taken by Soviet troops of the 1st Guards Army on 20 January 1945.

In 1950, Bardejov was declared a protected city core, and extensive restoration of its cultural heritage began. These efforts culminated in Bardejov receiving the European Gold Medal by the International Board of Trustees in Hamburg in 1986 – the first town in Czechoslovakia to receive the award. On 20 November 2000, Bardejov was selected by UNESCO as one of its World Heritage Sites, recognized for its Jewish Suburbia and historic town center. In November 2010, the city marked the 10th anniversary of its inscription on the UNESCO World Heritage list.

Today, Bardejov is known mainly for its authentic old town square, which, due to extensive restoration and preservation of its Medieval, Renaissance, and Gothic architecture, has made Bardejov a popular tourist destination. The town draws on its rich heritage to further develop cultural traditions, such as an annual trade fair and the Roland Games (commemorating its medieval past).

== In popular culture ==
In 2024, Bardejov, a movie about events that occurred during the Holocaust, was released.

== Landmarks ==
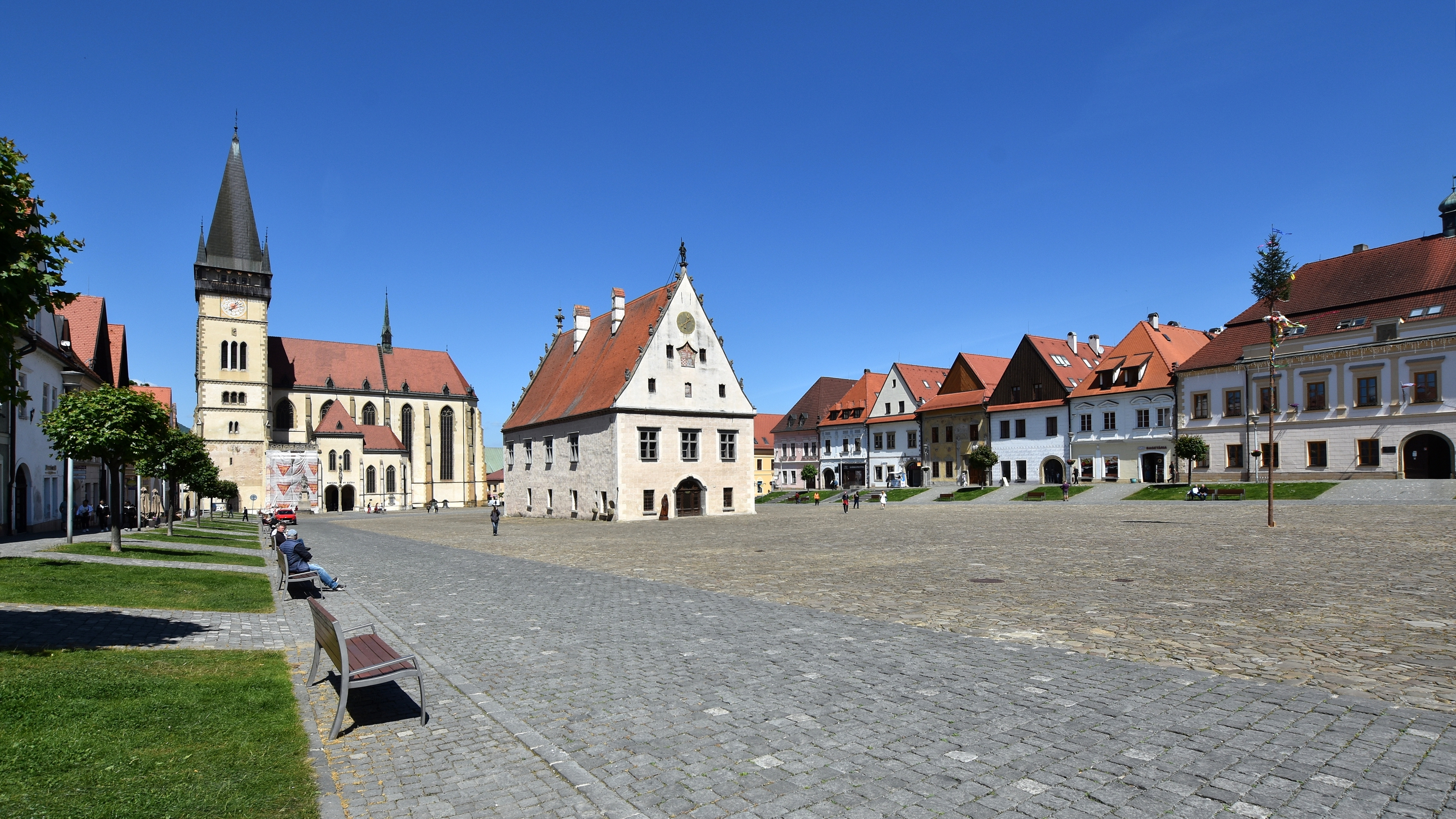
Central square with the Church of St. Aegidius

Bardejov is dominated by the monumental Church of St. Aegidius (Giles), mentioned for the first time in 1247. A three nave basilica with multiple chapels was completed in 1464. It hosts eleven precious Gothic winged altars with panel paintings. The Town Hall Square (Slovak: Radničné námestie), which used to be the town's medieval marketplace, is surrounded by well-preserved Gothic and Renaissance burghers' houses as well as the basilica.

The Church of St. Aegidius (Giles) was built by James of Polish Sącz. He is the teacher of Master Paul of Levoča, who built the tallest wooden altar in the world. The church has many altars.

One of the most interesting buildings is the town hall, built in 1505. The lower part was built in the Gothic style, while the upper part was finished in the Renaissance style. This was the headquarters of the city council and also the center of the town's economic, social, and cultural life. In 1903, the town hall was adapted to serve as Šariš County Museum (Sárosi múzeum), now known as the Šariš Museum Bardejov, one of the oldest and the biggest museums in Slovakia.

The fortification system and town walls date from the 14th and 15th centuries and are listed by the European Fund of Cultural Heritage as one of the most elaborate and best preserved medieval fortifications in Slovakia.

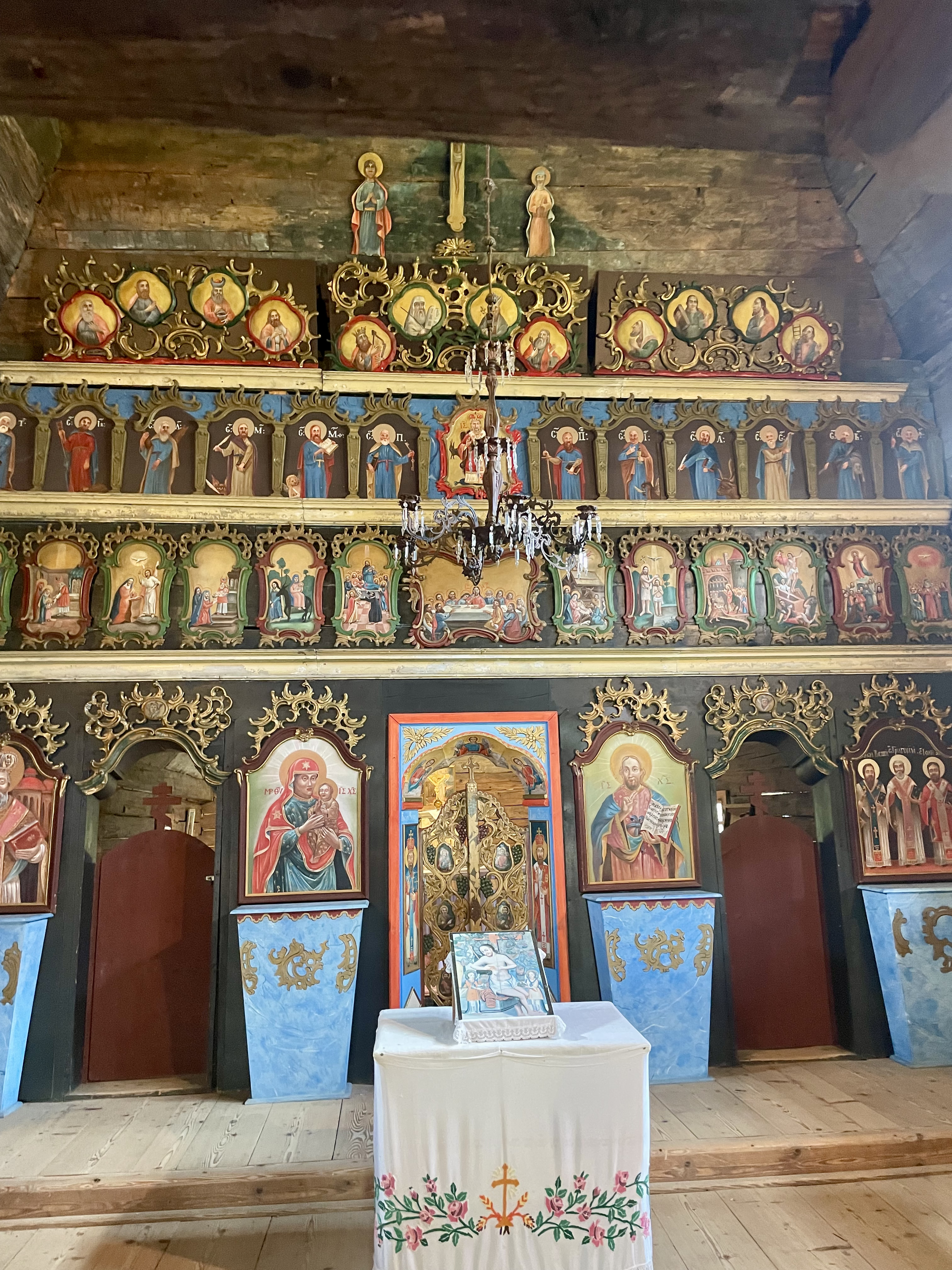
Altar is Saris Village Church, Bardejov 2022

About 2.5 km (1.6 mi) north of Bardejov is the spa town Bardejovské Kúpele. The therapeutic mineral water springs are claimed to be beneficial to people with oncological, blood circulation, and digestive tract problems. It also hosts an open-air museum of folk architecture (skansen).In the outskirts of the spa town Bardejovské Kúpele, there is a historic Slovak Village called Šariš Village Museum. It has buildings that would be found in a typical Slovak Village. The spa has played host to several dignitaries, including Marie Louise, Duchess of Parma (the wife of Napoleon Bonaparte), Tsar Alexander I of Russia and Empress Elisabeth of Austria-Hungary. In this spa they also sell oblátky.

== Sport ==
HC 46 Bardejov was the town's historic ice hockey team; they folded in 2016. HK Bardejov was founded the same year as a phoenix club to continue the club's hockey legacy.

Partizán Bardejov is the town's professional football team, who play at the local Municipal Stadium. The clubs' successful women's side folded in 2012.

== Administrative divisions ==
The town consists of the following boroughs:

- Bardejov
- Bardejovská Nová Ves
- Bardejovská Zábava
- Bardejovské Kúpele (local spa town)
- Dlhá Lúka (annexed in 1971)
- Mihaľov

== Climate ==
Bardejov has a humid continental climate (Köppen: Dfb).

Climate data for Bardejov
Month	Jan	Feb	Mar	Apr	May	Jun	Jul	Aug	Sep	Oct	Nov	Dec	Year
Mean daily maximum °C (°F)	−0.2 (31.6)	2.5 (36.5)	7.7 (45.9)	13.9 (57.0)	18.4 (65.1)	22.1 (71.8)	24.0 (75.2)	24.0 (75.2)	18.6 (65.5)	13.0 (55.4)	6.7 (44.1)	1.1 (34.0)	12.6 (54.8)
Daily mean °C (°F)	−2.7 (27.1)	−0.7 (30.7)	3.3 (37.9)	8.8 (47.8)	13.4 (56.1)	17.1 (62.8)	18.8 (65.8)	18.4 (65.1)	13.4 (56.1)	8.2 (46.8)	3.5 (38.3)	−1.1 (30.0)	8.4 (47.0)
Mean daily minimum °C (°F)	−5.4 (22.3)	−4.1 (24.6)	−1.0 (30.2)	3.5 (38.3)	7.9 (46.2)	11.8 (53.2)	13.4 (56.1)	12.9 (55.2)	8.6 (47.5)	4.1 (39.4)	0.6 (33.1)	−3.3 (26.1)	4.1 (39.4)
Average precipitation mm (inches)	46.1 (1.81)	46.3 (1.82)	48.6 (1.91)	60.5 (2.38)	96.0 (3.78)	96.8 (3.81)	121.7 (4.79)	82.7 (3.26)	77.5 (3.05)	60.1 (2.37)	47.1 (1.85)	42.1 (1.66)	825.5 (32.49)
Source: Weather.Directory

== Demographics ==
Historical population
Year	Pop.	±%
1970	15,225	—
1980	23,741	+55.9%
1991	30,812	+29.8%
2001	33,247	+7.9%
2011	33,696	+1.4%
2021	30,840	−8.5%
Source: Censuses

=== Ethnicity ===
Census 2021 (1+%)
Ethnicity	Number	Fraction
Slovak	27,364	88.72%
Not found out	2323	7.53%
Rusyn	1998	6.47%
Romani	698	2.26%
Total	30,840	

In year 2021 was 30,840 people by ethnicity 27,364 as Slovak, 2323 as Not found out, 1998 as Rusyn, 698 as Romani, 208 as Ukrainian, 142 as Czech, 104 as Other, 78 as Polish, 55 as Hungarian, 38 as Russian, 31 as Vietnamese, 19 as German, 8 as Jewish, 7 as English, 6 as Italian, 5 as Moravian, 4 as Austrian, 4 as Greek, 3 as Chinese, 3 as Irish, 3 as Turkish, 3 as Serbian, 3 as Romanian, 3 as Canadian, 2 as Silesian, 2 as Croatian, 1 as Iranian, 1 as French and 1 as Albanian.

Note on population: The difference values of population numbers in the table "Population statistic" and in the sections "Ethnicity" & "Religion" is caused by the use of various statistical methods.

By the 1910 census, it had 2,571 Slovak, 2,179 Hungarian and 1,617 German inhabitants.

==== Jews ====
Jews lived in the town for about 300 years. By the 1920s, Jews made up 34% of the total population of Bardejov. In 1942, when Slovakia was under the influence of Nazi Germany, more than 3,000 Jews from Bardejov were deported to concentration camps, where most were murdered. Bardejov is now a "town without Jews."

=== Religion ===
Census 2021 (1+%)
Religion	Number	Fraction
Roman Catholic Church	16,153	52.38%
Greek Catholic Church	4821	15.63%
None	3924	12.72%
Not found out	2238	7.26%
Evangelical Church	2129	6.9%
Eastern Orthodox Church	1081	3.51%
Total	30,840	

In year 2021 was 30,840 people by religion 16,153 from Roman Catholic Church, 4821 from Greek Catholic Church, 3924 from None, 2238 from Not found out, 2129 from Evangelical Church, 1081 from Eastern Orthodox Church, 99 from Jehovah's Witnesses, 70 from Church of the Brethren, 59 from Other, 53 from Apostolic Church, 50 from Ad hoc movements, 34 from Christian Congregations in Slovakia, 28 from Other and not ascertained christian church, 27 from Calvinist Church, 18 from Buddhism, 13 from Paganism and natural spirituality, 11 from Islam, 8 from Jewish community, 7 from United Methodist Church, 4 from Old Catholic Church, 4 from Seventh-day Adventist Church, 3 from Czechoslovak Hussite Church, 2 from Hinduism, 2 from Church of Jesus Christ of Latter-day Saints, 1 from New Apostolic Church and 1 from Baptists Church.

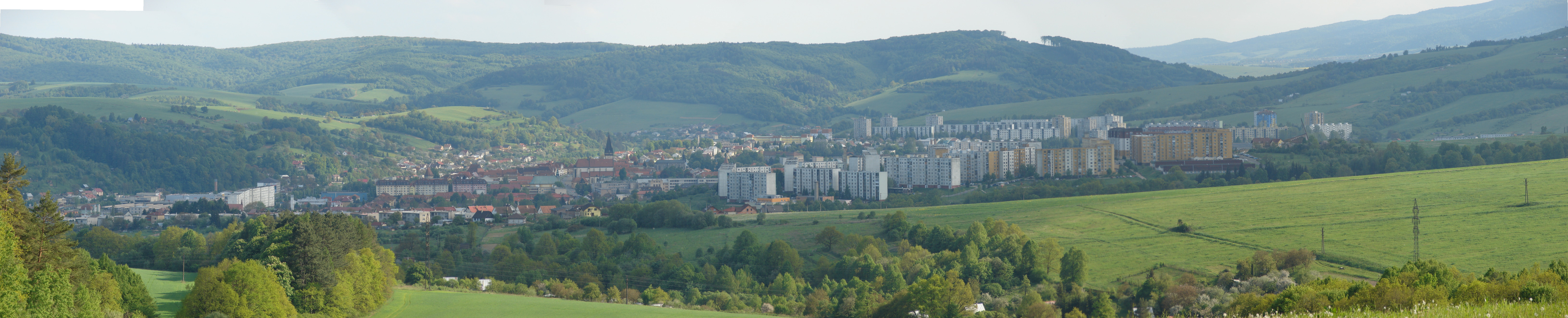
Panorama of Bardejov, summer 2008

== Notable people ==
- Kéler Béla (1820–1882) – Hungarian composer famous in his time, best known for Erinnerung an Bartfeld csárdás
- Radoslav Rochallyi (born 1980) – writer
- Jack Garfein (grew up in Bardejov in the 30s and early 40s) – film director
- Martin Šmilňák (born 1973) – politician
- Morris D. Waldman (1879–1963) – rabbi and social worker, born in Bardejov

== Twin towns – sister cities ==
Bardejov is twinned with:

- Calais, France
- Česká Lípa, Czech Republic
- Gorlice, Poland
- Jasło, Poland
- Kaštela, Croatia
- Krynica-Zdrój, Poland
- Mikulov, Czech Republic
- Mogilev, Belarus
- Molde, Norway
- Muszyna, Poland
- Přerov, Czech Republic
- Sárospatak, Hungary
- Sremski Karlovci, Serbia
- Suzdal, Russia
- Tiachiv, Ukraine
- Zamość, Poland

== Controversy ==
=== Fair numbering alteration ===
In 2017, Bardejov was scheduled to host the 666th annual Bardejov Fair (Bardejovský jarmok (jurmak)), one of the largest cultural events in the region. However, Mayor Boris Hanuščak officially altered the designation of the event to the 667th fair, citing concerns that the number 666 could cause public anxiety. To avoid long-term chronological inaccuracies in record-keeping, the subsequent event in 2018 was also officially designated as the 667th annual fair, after which regular sequential numbering resumed with the 668th edition in 2019.

=== 2023 Pride event reception ===
In 2023, Bardejov hosted its first public LGBTQ+ Pride event. The event faced opposition from local conservative and religious groups, who organised public prayer gatherings in the town square concurrently with the cultural festival.

== See also ==
- Battle of Bardejov
- List of municipalities and towns in Slovakia

== Genealogical resources ==
The records for genealogical research are available at the state archive in Prešov (Slovak: Štátny archív v Prešove).

- Roman Catholic church records (births/marriages/deaths): 1671–1899 (parish A)
- Greek Catholic church records (births/marriages/deaths): 1753–1906 (parish B)
- Lutheran church records (births/marriages/deaths): 1592–1896 (parish A)
