= Basilica of St Giles =

Catholic church in Bardejov, Slovakia

Coordinates: 49.2933°N 21.2758°E

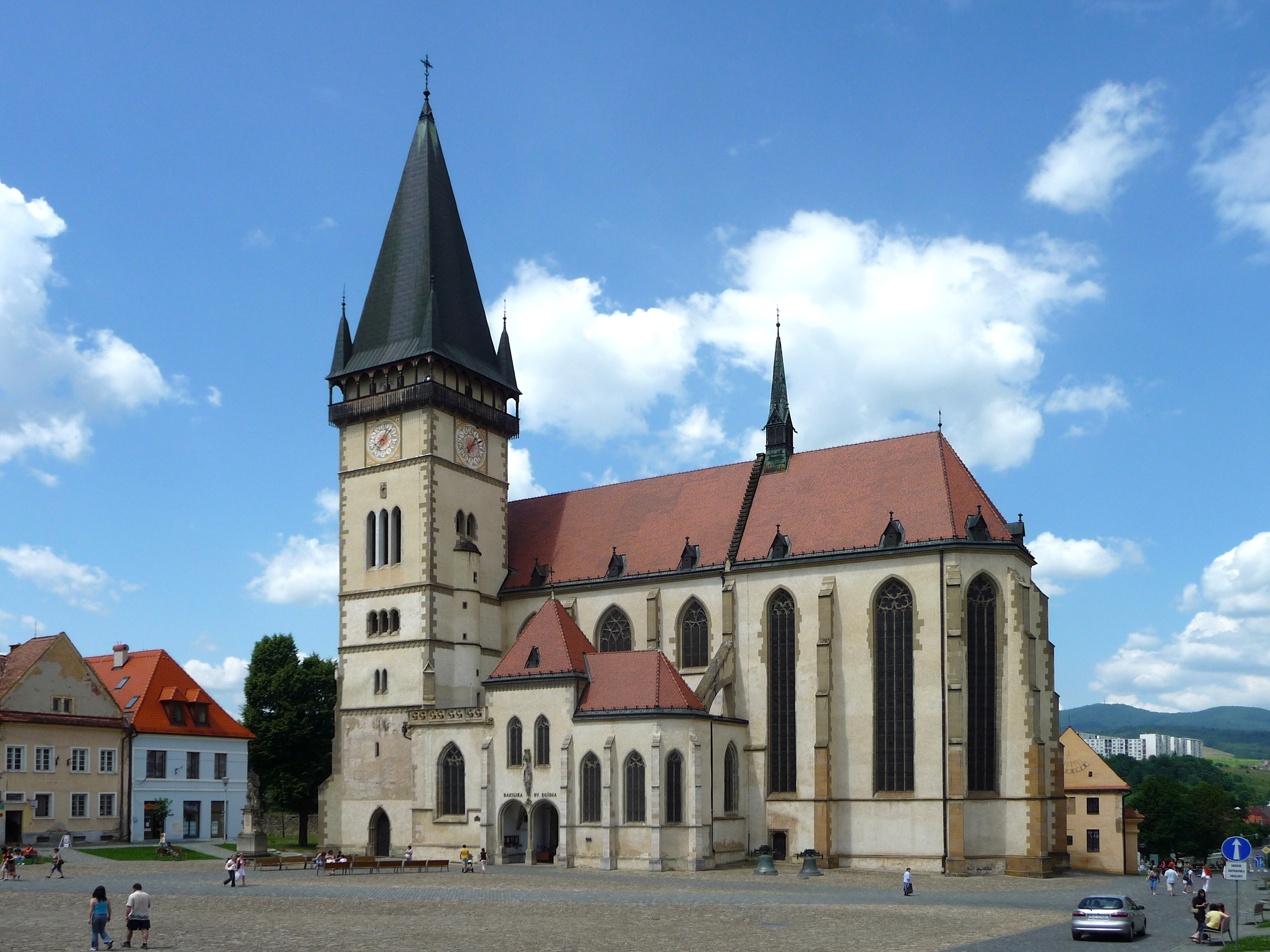
Basilica of St. Giles

Basilica of St Giles in Bardejov, Slovakia, is a Gothic sacral building, which is situated in the northern part of the Town-Hall square (in Slovak Radničné námestie). Bardejov is located in the larger area of town Prešov in the region called Šariš.

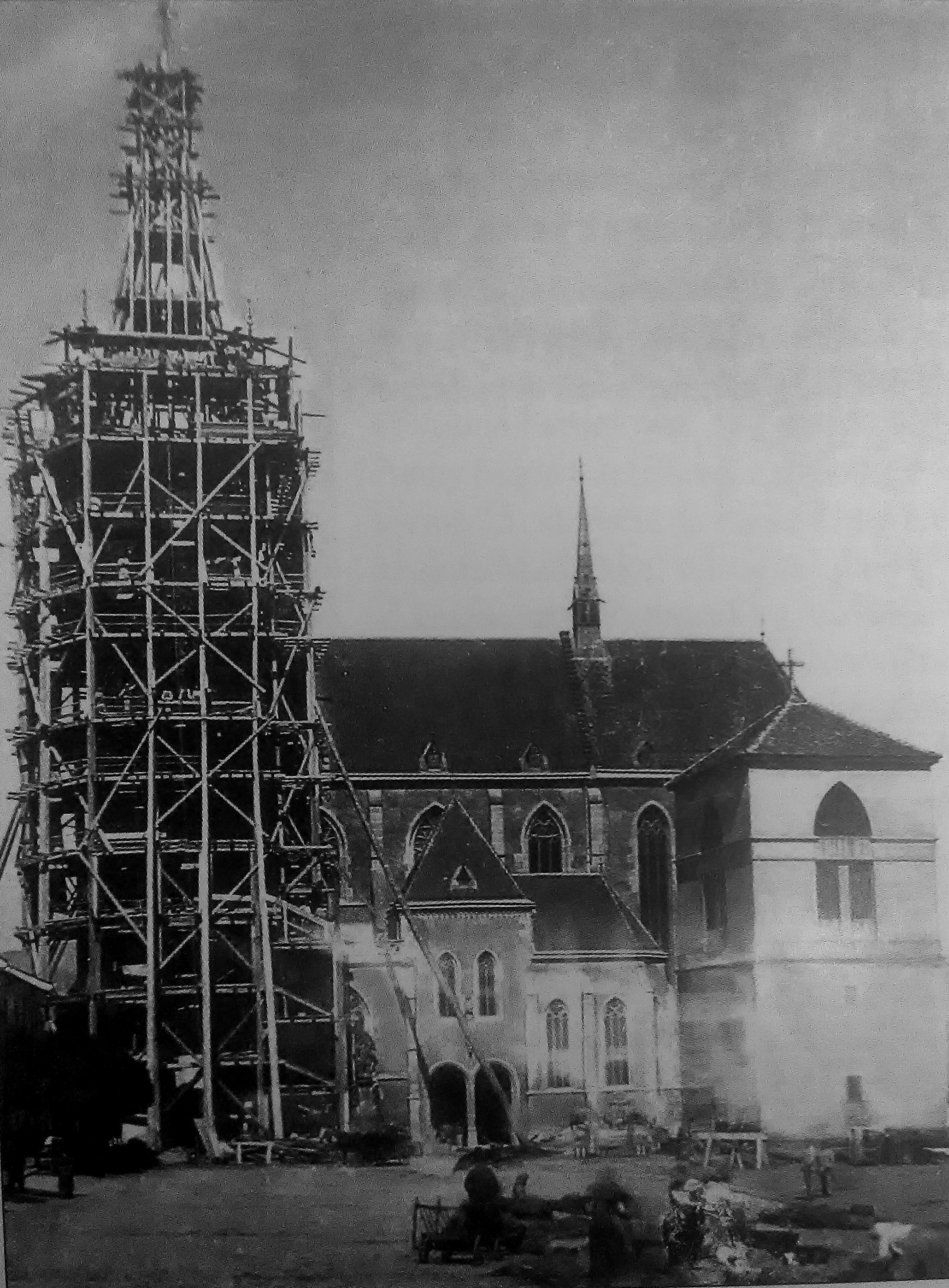
Construction of tower

Around 1206, Cistercian monks of Polish Koprzywnica established a monastery that was eventually dedicated and named after Saint Giles. In the 13th century, The Royal Charter of King Bela IV was the first to mention the church in local documents. The temple is also mentioned by Karol's son and successor, Louis I of Hungary. The construction of the temple, that exists today, began in the mid-14th century when German colonists settled the territory.

In 1427, the church is documented as having a three-aisled basilica with simple arcades. Sculptures on the altar of St Anna dating back to 1390–1400 may serve as proof that an earlier temple was indeed constructed in the 13th century.

The rebuilding and expansion of the temple began in 1448. The royal builder, Štefán from Košice constructed the base of the sanctuary, the choir, the sacristy, and the tribune, which is also known as the Chapel of St Catherine. King Matthias's Oratory carried on the building. The construction of the sanctuary ended with a new vaulting in 1464 and a year later, he built the new presbytery with the unique stone pastophorium.

In 1466, Master James of the Sacz made a Gothic main altar. The only sculpture of St Giles that remained from the original temple is located in the chapel of the Virgin Mary. In this period, a bronze baptistery was also constructed.

During 1482–86, three chapels were built in the southern part: St Elizabeth, St Andrew and the Virgin Mary. The original vault in the chapel of St Andrew is preserved. In 1486 the first bell, Jonh (Jan), was made. In 1584 bell founder, John from the Polish town, Tarnów made one of the largest bells in Slovakia for the church. It weighs 4 tons and is named, "Urban".

The church is a masterpiece of east Slovak late-Gothic architecture and its large-scale spatial conception, as well as in its detail, differentiate the basilica. For example, some of the building's vaults were similar to the vault systems of Peter Parler.

In 1521, Masters John Kraus and John Emerici decorated the first floor of the tower's exterior, particularly its south side, with a fresco of St. Stephen, the first Hungarian king. Italian Masters, Louis and Bernard Pel of Lugano remodeled the south facade in Renaissance style in 1564. They reconstructed three chapels and a portal to create a unified architectural complex.

Disasters such as fires, earthquakes, bombings, and architectural collapses have plagued the basilica throughout the centuries. The extensive reconstruction of the church began after a fire in which the entire city nearly burned down on Easter Monday, 1878. The reconstruction was led by architects, Imre Steindl and Frederick Schmulek. The interior was equipped with a Neo-Gothic altar and pulpit as well as the facade as one sees today. The facade took 20 years to rebuild.

Other architectural improvements were made in the 20th century. In 1990, the two church bells, "Urban" and "John" burst. At the same time, the church was renamed, "basilica", the bell "John" was replaced by a new bell, "Joseph", weighing 700 kg.

Pope John Paul II declared the church a basilica minor on 23 November 2000 in the Apostolic letter Consueverunt Romani Pontifices.

== Description ==
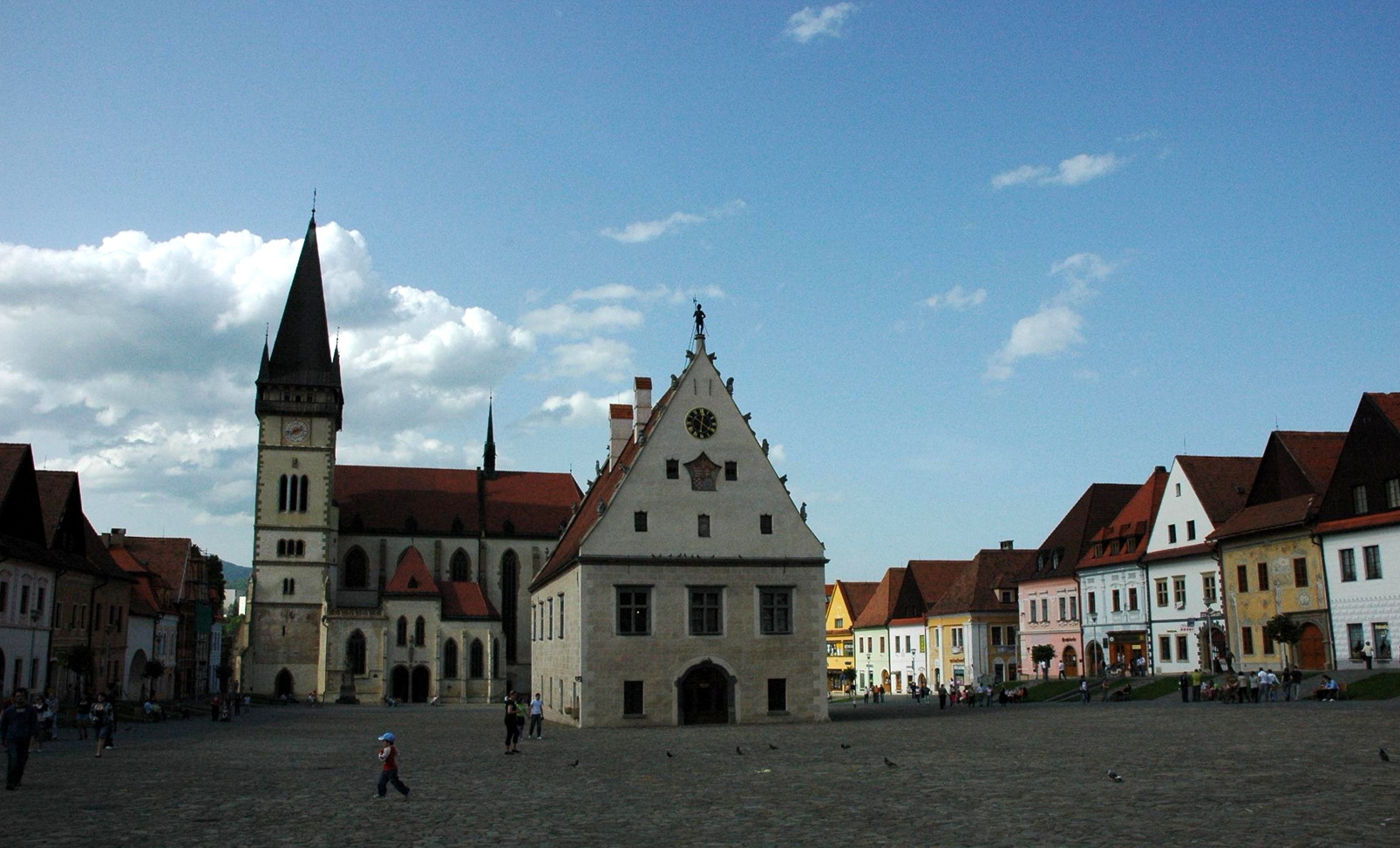
Basilica of St. Giles

St Giles's temple is a three-aisled basilica. Its aisles run an east to west; the main entrance is on the south side. The presbytery is closed by the polygonal ending. The sacristy was brought up to the north wall, where there is a hallway with two side chapels and stoppage at the third chapel on the south side.

The presbytery is vaulted by a net vault. It is separated from the central nave with a triumphal arch, which is partly filled with a wooden Calvary sculpture from the late 15th century.

A square-based tower lives on the southwest corner of the church. It is finished by wooden arcade gallery, covered by the pyramidal roof and complemented by four small pyramidal roofs in the corners.

== Exterior of the church ==
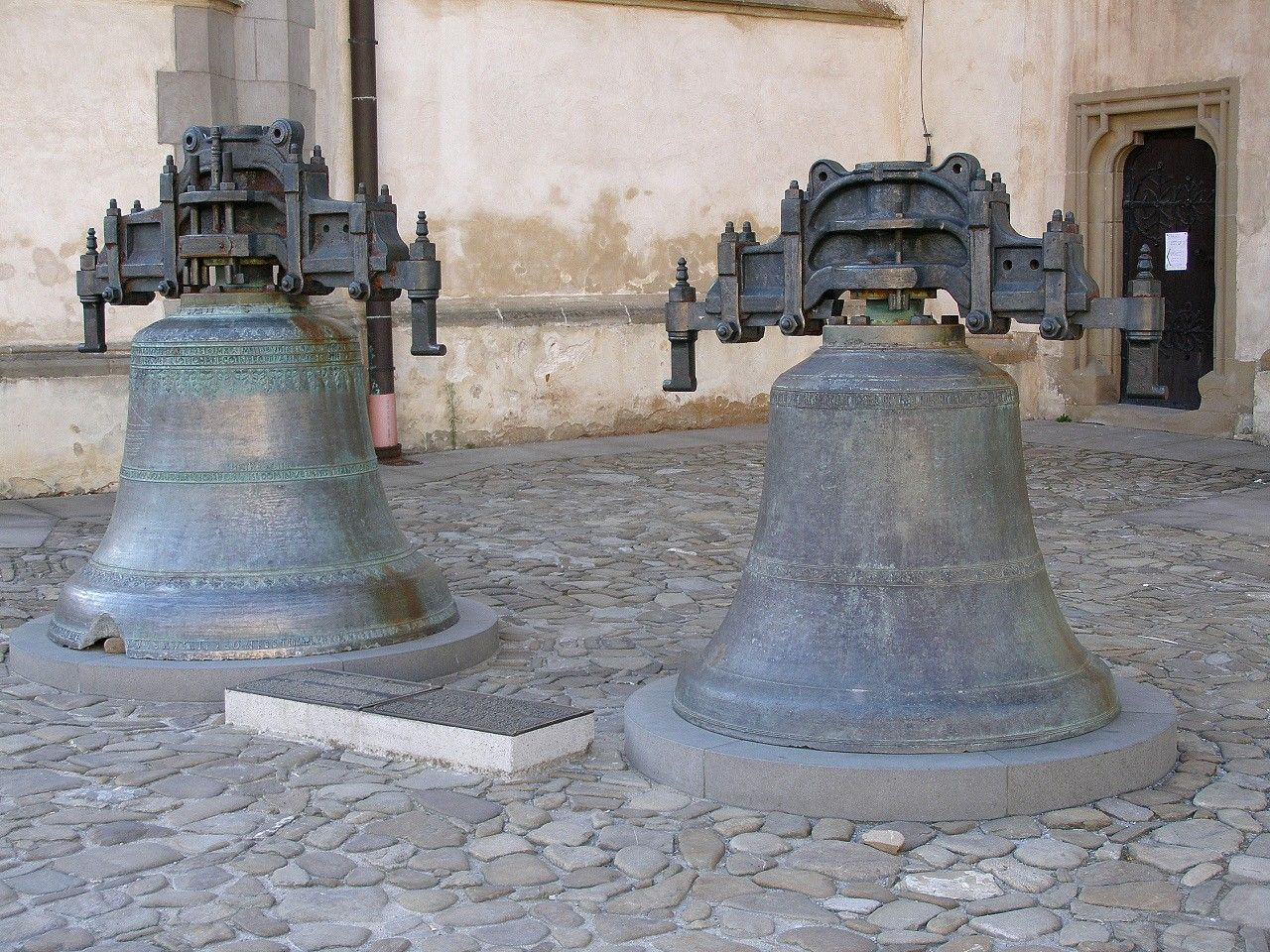
Bells, Urban (left one) and John (right one)

The Church of St Giles is situated on the north side of the Town-Hall Square. It is built in the traditional east - west axis. The presbytery is situated in the eastern part. The central nave is 24 metres high and dominates to the church. There are also two aisles and a presbytery. The 10-metre-high roofs of the presbytery and the nave are separated from each other by a wall, topped by a spire with a cross.

An imposing tower dominates the southwest corner of the church. The tower was completed in the neo-Gothic style of the late 19th century. With its height of 76 metres, it is one of the highest church towers in Slovakia. It has six storeys, separated from each other by stone cornices. The belfry is in the fourth story; the bells "Urban" and "John" and the bell called "Signum" are situated there. The fifth story has been adapted for the clock mechanism.

A wooden balcony, topped by a pyramidal roof and a four-meter-high metal cross, is situated on sixth story. The decoration of the south wall includes a stone relief with a city's coat-of-arms. The western facade of the church is reinforced by support pillars and includes Gothic arches and a big rosette window with stone tracery.

On the south side of the church are the chapels, prominently grouped around the main entrance. The three chapels are named: the Chapel of the Virgin Mary, the Chapel of St Elisabeth, and the Chapel of St Andrew. The whole church is lit through high, mostly three-part, glazed Gothic windows; glass fillings of the windows were replaced in the 19th century. The south side is decorated by an ornamental stone sculpture of St. Florian.

== Interior of the church ==
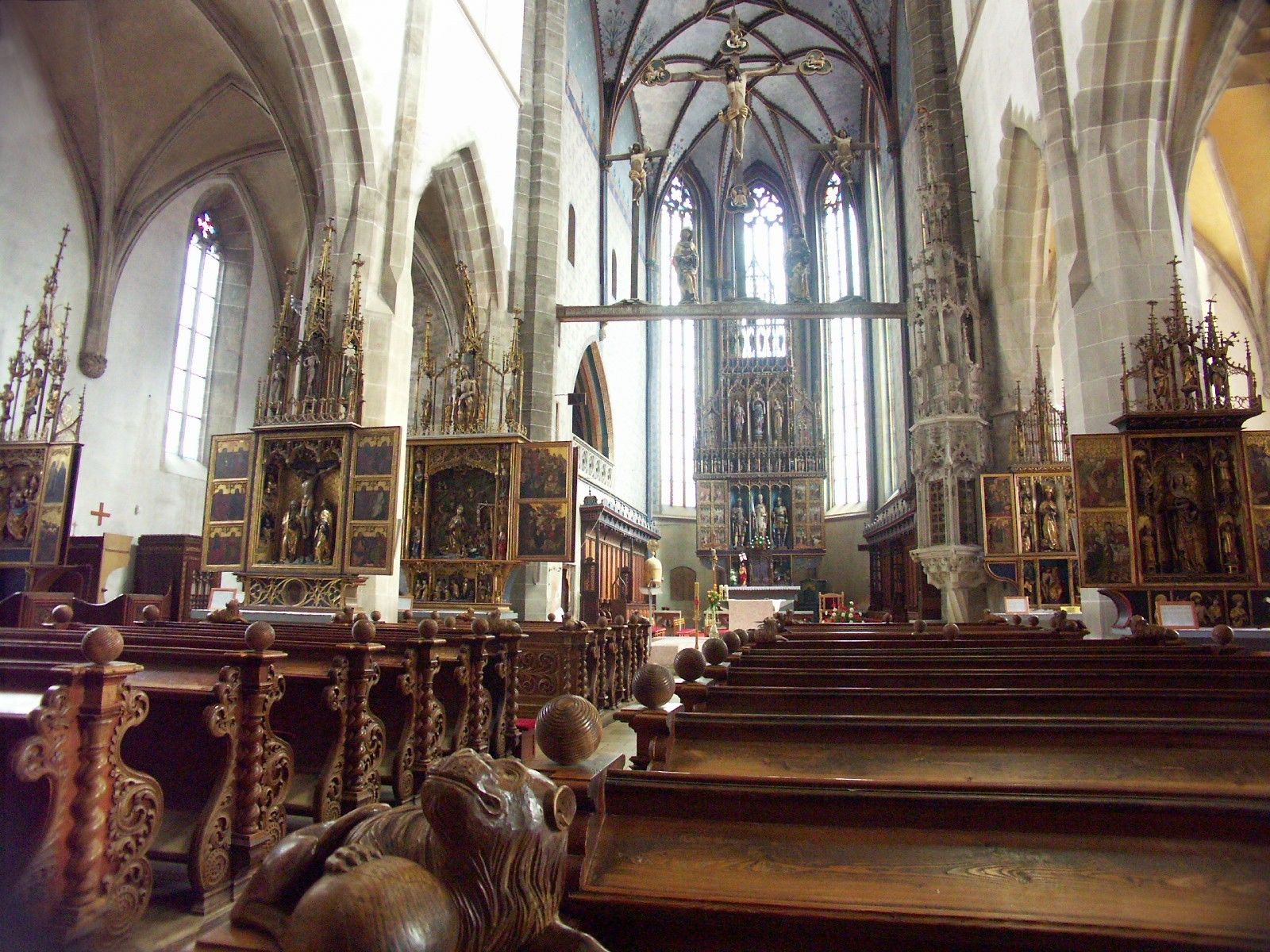
Interior of Basilica of St Giles

=== Nave and presbytery ===
The central nave is lightened by Gothic windows on the south side. The presbytery has the same high as the nave, it is separated from its with profiled stone triumphal arch. The whole central space is vaulted with bays of net vault, placing on pentagonal chaplets decorated with floral ornaments with the coat of arms in the middle of the chaplet.

On the western side of the nave is a Royal - Organ oratory, vaulted with the star-vault. The stone spiral staircase leads to the oratory. Both side naves are vaulted with three bays of the simple cross-vault, their ribs set on the wall on figural brackets.

=== Sacristy and choir ===
The sacristy and the northern choir above the main nave are accessible by two separate Gothic portals. The sacristy and the choir have a ribbed net vault. The oratory's vault contains ribs, which are placed directly into the wall on figural consoles portraying St George in battle with the dragon.

=== Chapels ===
The eastern chapel has an irregular polygonal swallow tails, and reticulated vault with ribs. Southern oratory also has a vault with a simple conical consoles.

West Chapel has a rectangular wall. The room is vaulted with simple rectangular vault, which ribs end on different kinds of brackets. The chapel is lightened by a window on the south side and geometric tracery.

=== Tower ===
The tower has a wooden gallery with an arcade on the sixth storey.

=== Roof ===
The roof of the church is the result of the reconstruction in the 1880s. The nave and the presbytery have a gable roof. The south nave has a very shallow aisle roof covered with metal sheets.

=== Floor ===
Floors in the main and side aisle and in both southern chapels are made of stoneware tiles laid in concrete.

=== Ground plan of the St Giles ===
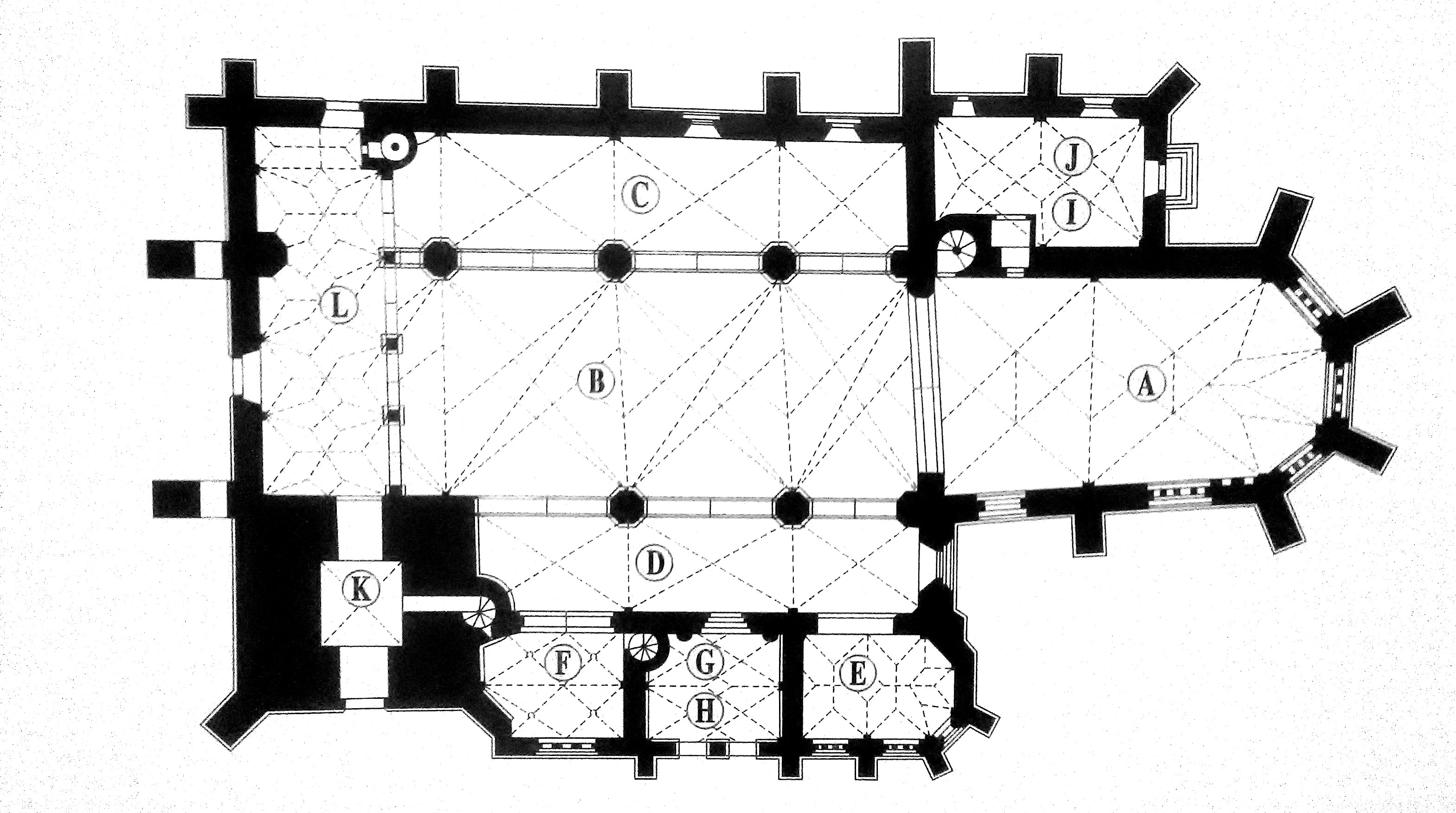
Ground plan of Basilica of St Giles A. Presbytery B. Nave C. North aisle D. South aisle E. Chapel of the Virgin Mary F. Chapel of St. Andrew G. Antechamber H. Chapel of St. Elisabeth (above antechamber) I. Sacristy J. Chapel of St. Catherine (above sacristy) K. Tower L. Choir loft

=== Altars ===
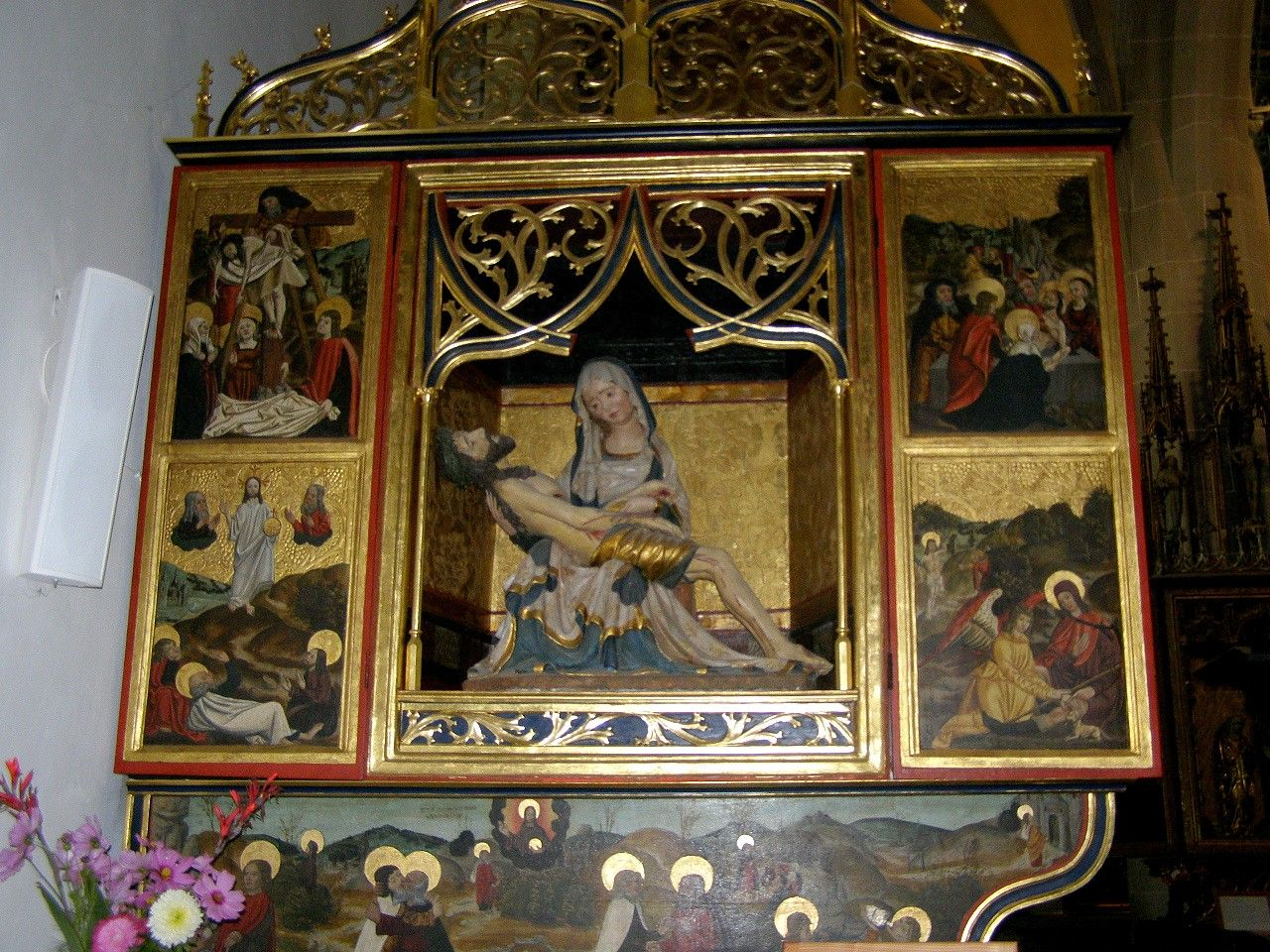
Altar of the Pietá

- Main Neo-Gothic altar of St. Giles (1888)
- Gothic winged altar of the Nativity (1480–1490)
- Gothic winged altar Vir Dolorum (1500–1510)
- Gothic winged altar of the Crucifixion (1480–1490)
- Gothic winged altar of Virgin Mary (1505)
- Gothic winged altar of St. Apollonia (1490–1510)
- Gothic winged altar of the Pietá (1480–1490)
- Gothic winged altar of St. Ann (1490–1500)
- Gothic winged altar of St. Andrew (1440–1460)
- Gothic winged altar of St. Elisabeth of Hungary (1480–1490)
- Gothic winged altar of St. Barbara (1450–1470)
- Gothic winged altar of Virgin Mary (1485)

== Bibliography ==
- J. Božová, G.Drobniak, F. Gutek - Kostol sv. Egídia v Bardejove, SAJANCY, Bardejov, 1998, ISBN 80-968069-0-4
- G. Drobniak, Bazilika minor sv. Egídia v Bardejove, Košice, Agentúra SAŠA, 2007
- V. Jankovič, Národné kultúrne pamiatky na Slovensku, Osveta, Martin, 1984
- Slovensko - Kultúra, Obzor, Bratislava, 1980
- Ľ. Hromadová, R. Hriadelová, Bardejov, Tatran, Bratislava, 1977
- A. Frický, Bardejov, kultúrne pamiatky, Východoslovenské vydavateľstvo, Košice, 1976
- Z. Bartošová a kol., Umenie na Slovensku, Slovart, Bratislava, 2007, ISBN 978-80-8085-435-5
- V. Dvořáková a kol., Bardejov - mestská pamiatková rezervácia, Slovenský ústav pamiatkovej starostlivosti, Bratislava, 1991, ISBN 80-85128-41-1
