= Šariš Museum in Bardejov =

Museum of Šariš region in Bardejov, Slovakia

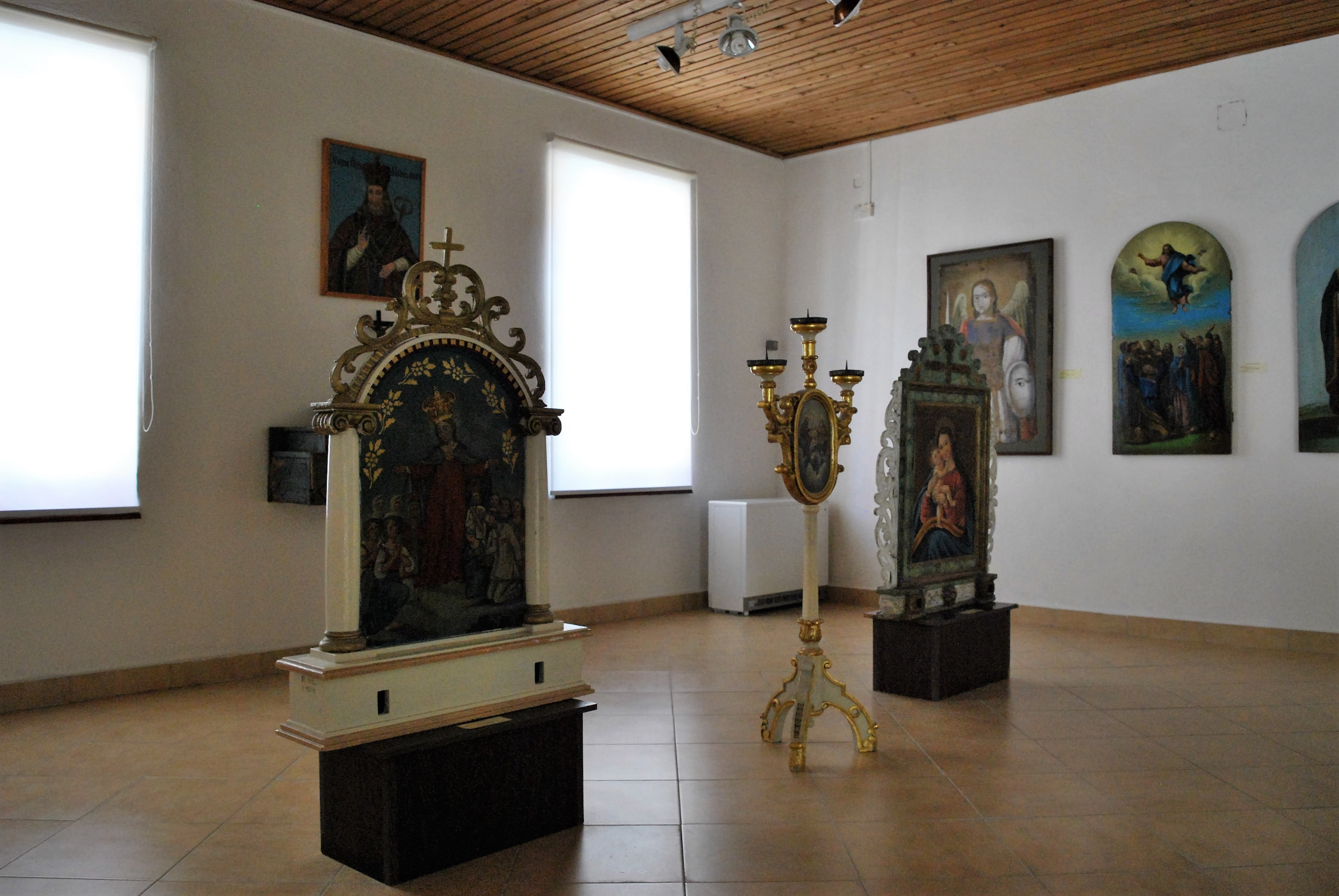
- Part of the Carpathian icons exposition
- Established: 1903; 123 years ago
- Location: Bardejov, Slovakia
- Coordinates: 49°17′33″N 21°16′35″E
- Collection size: 700 000
- Director: František Gutek
- Website: http://www.muzeumbardejov.sk

František Gutek talks about the Museum.

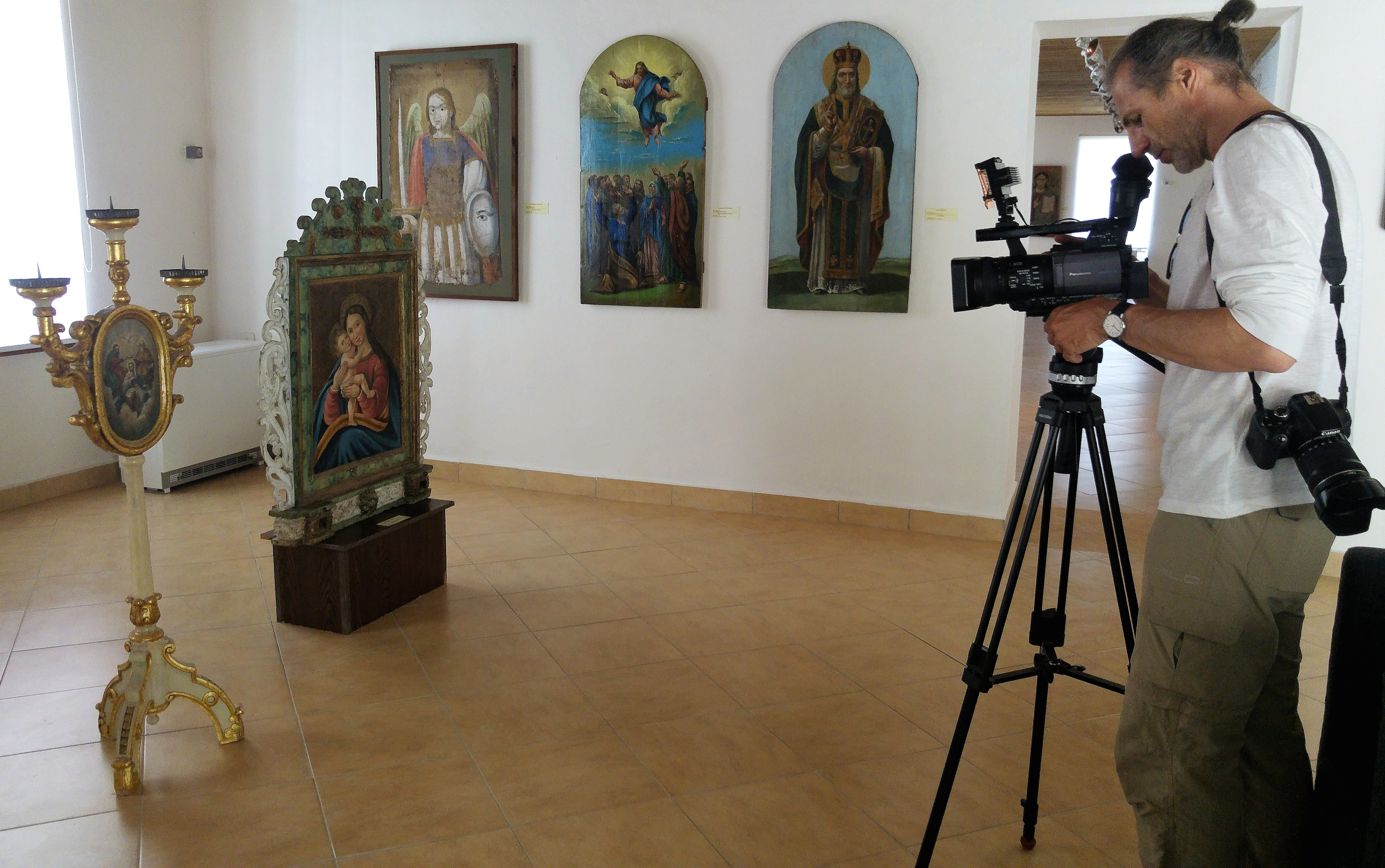
Museum's documentation

Šariš Museum in Bardejov is a museum of the Šariš region in Bardejov, Slovakia.

The museum was founded in 1903 as The Museum of Šariš County (sl. Župa). Its first exposition and object purchases were focused on natural history. In 1907 a new historical exposition was opened in the interior of the City Hall, and it was composed of the objects donated by church institutions and organizations. The Šariš Museum safely survived the First and Second World War. Nowadays it is known because of its natural history and historical exposition, but also because of its ethnographic open-air exposition (Museum of Folk Architecture, Ethnographic Open-Air Collection, Bardejov Spa in Bardejovske Kupele) and Carpathian Icons Gallery, one of the largest of its kind in Europe. It is one of the biggest museums in Slovakia with its collection of 700 000 objects.

== Gallery ==
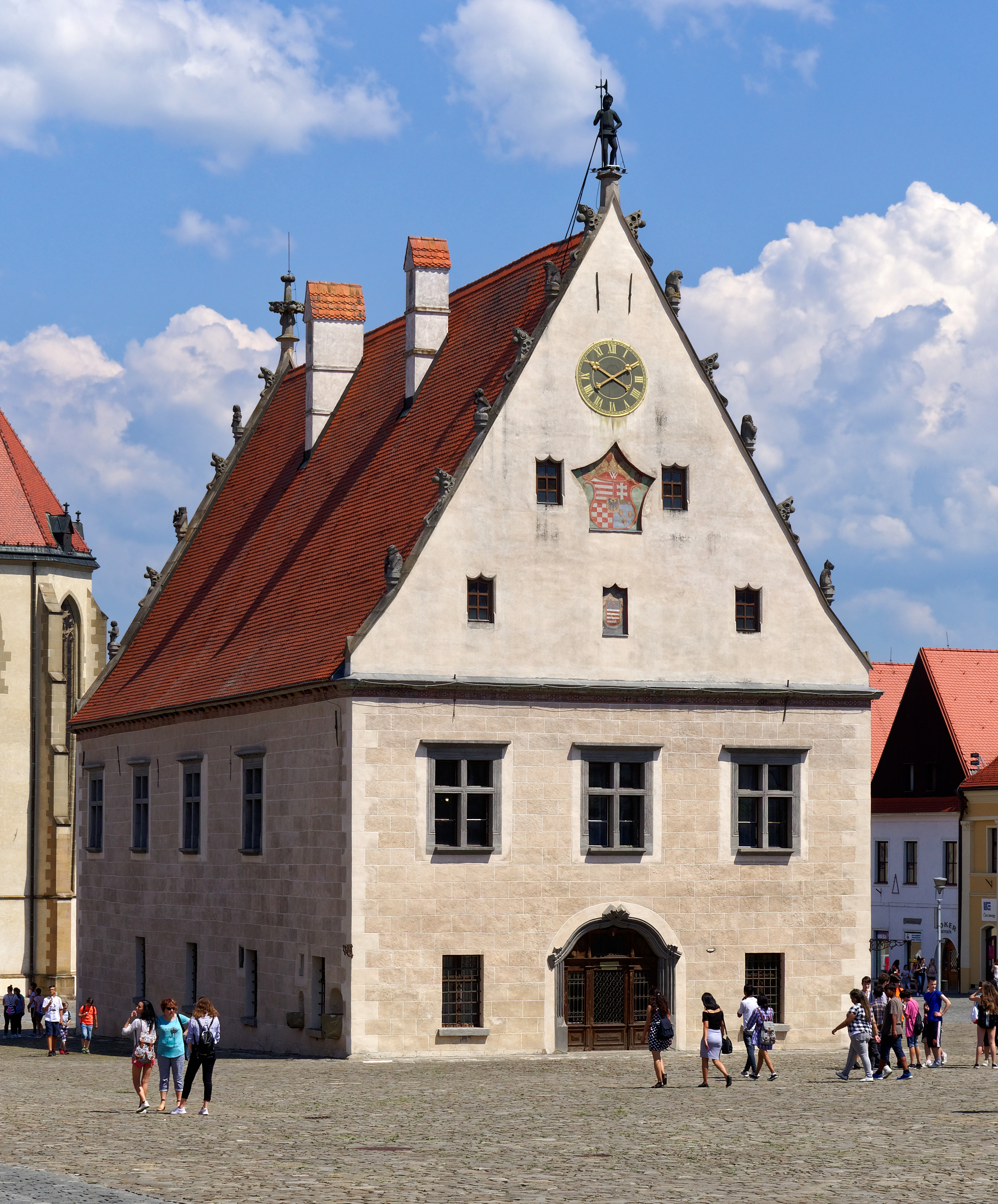
Šariš Museum in Bardejov - Bardejov city history exhibition, at the city's historic town hall

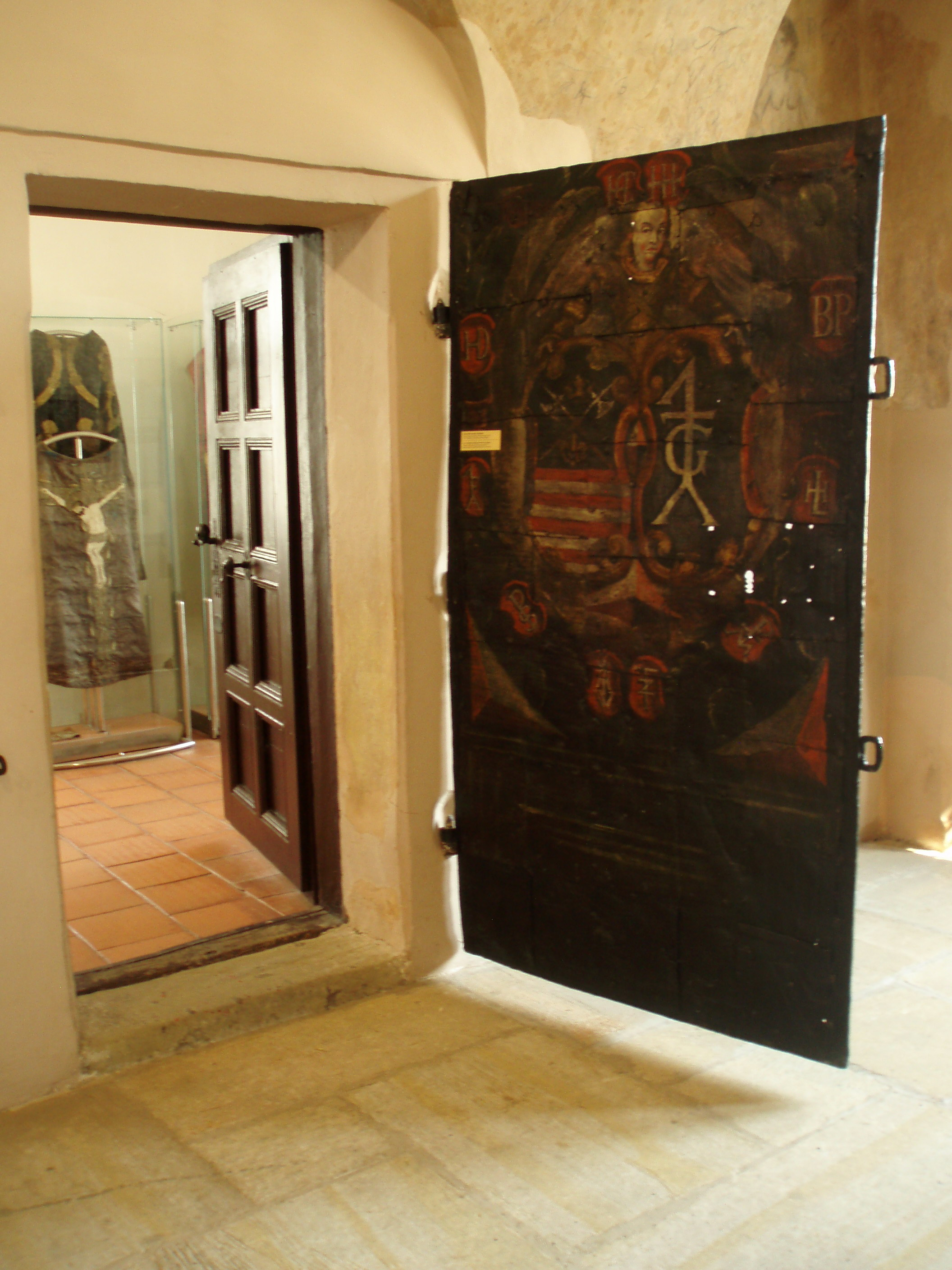
Šariš Museum in Bardejov - Bardejov city history exhibition interiors at the historic town hall

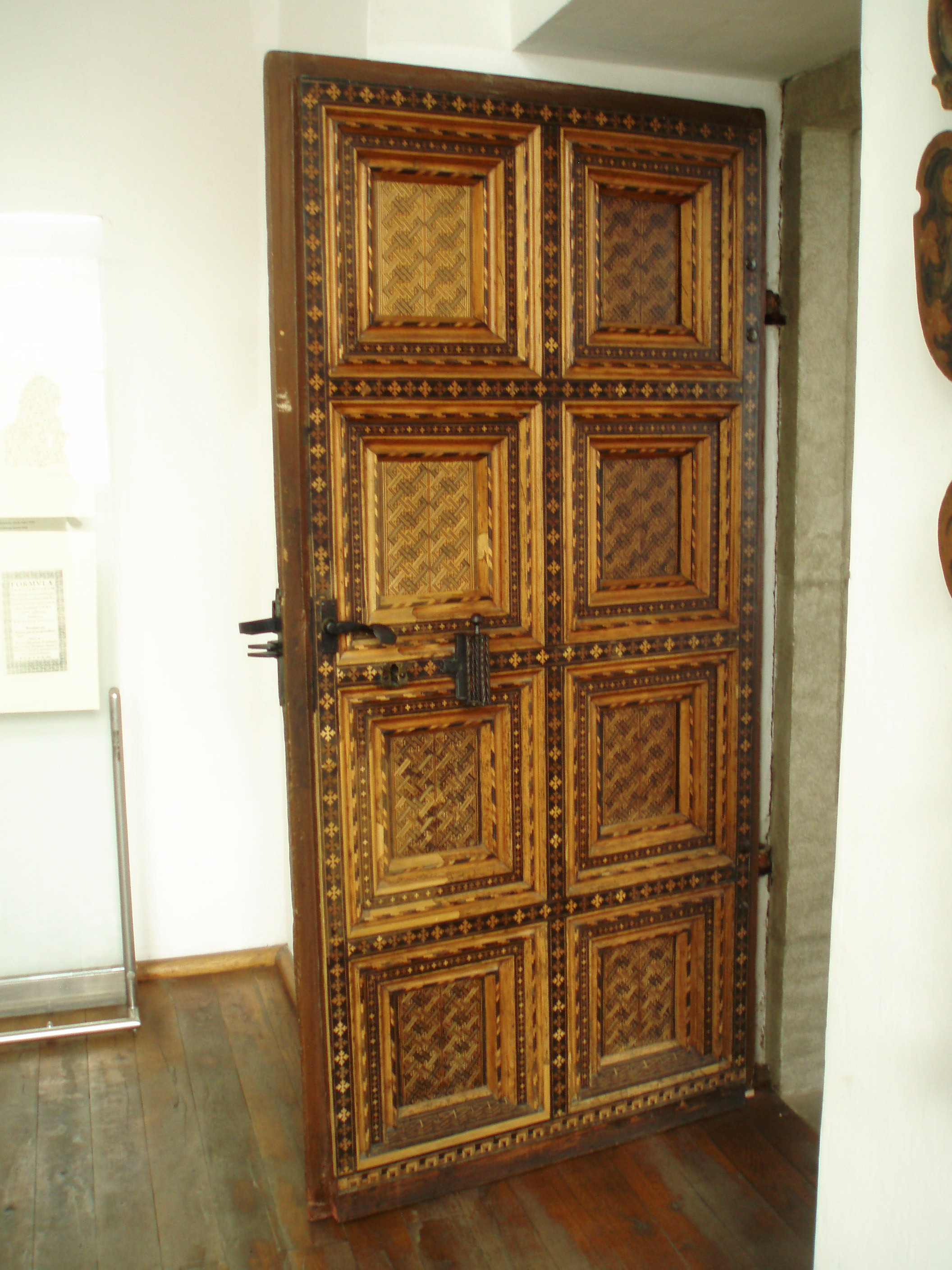
Šariš Museum in Bardejov - Bardejov city history exhibition interiors at the historic town hall

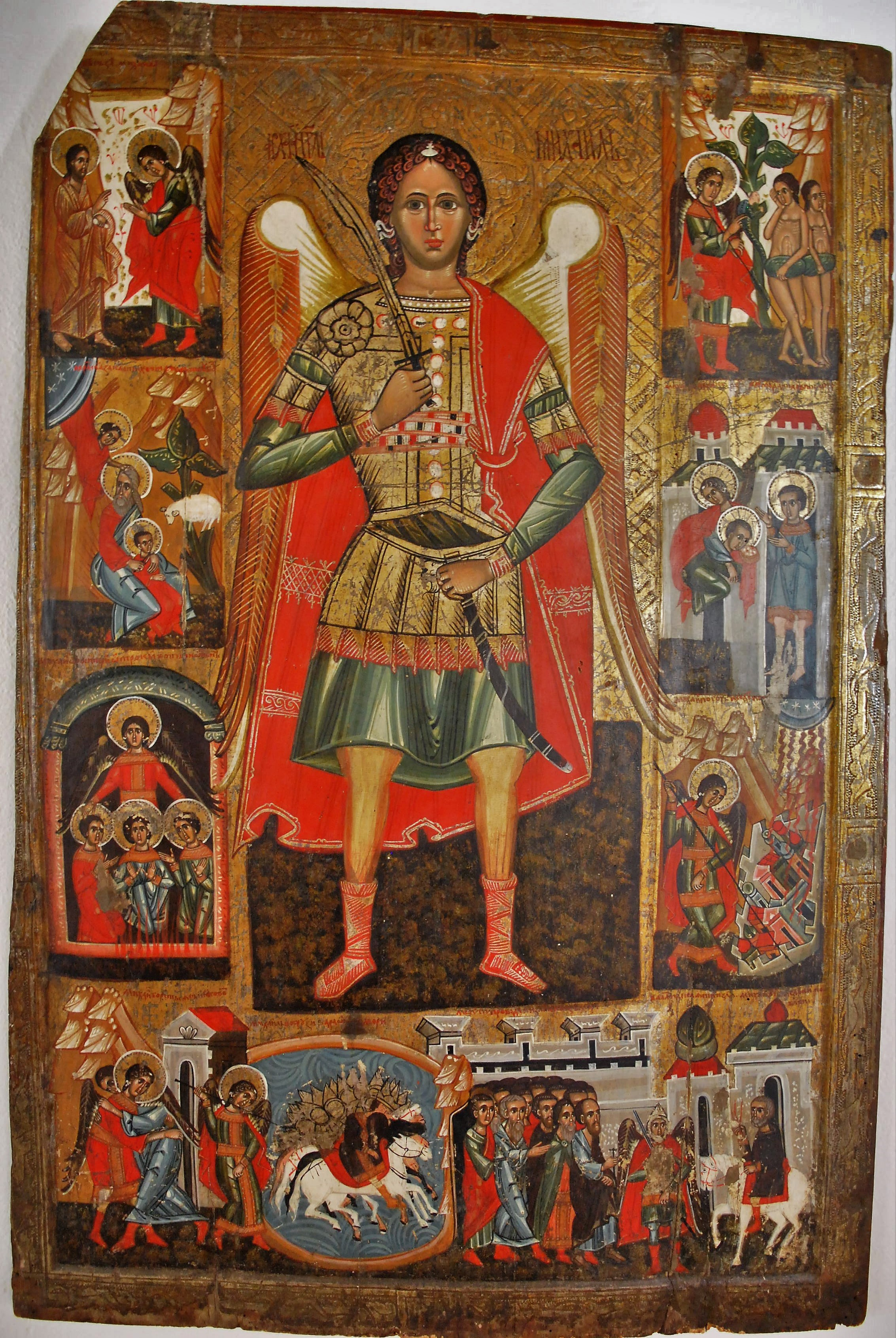
An icon of Archangel Michael, from the Icons and religious art exhibition of the Šariš Museum in Bardejov

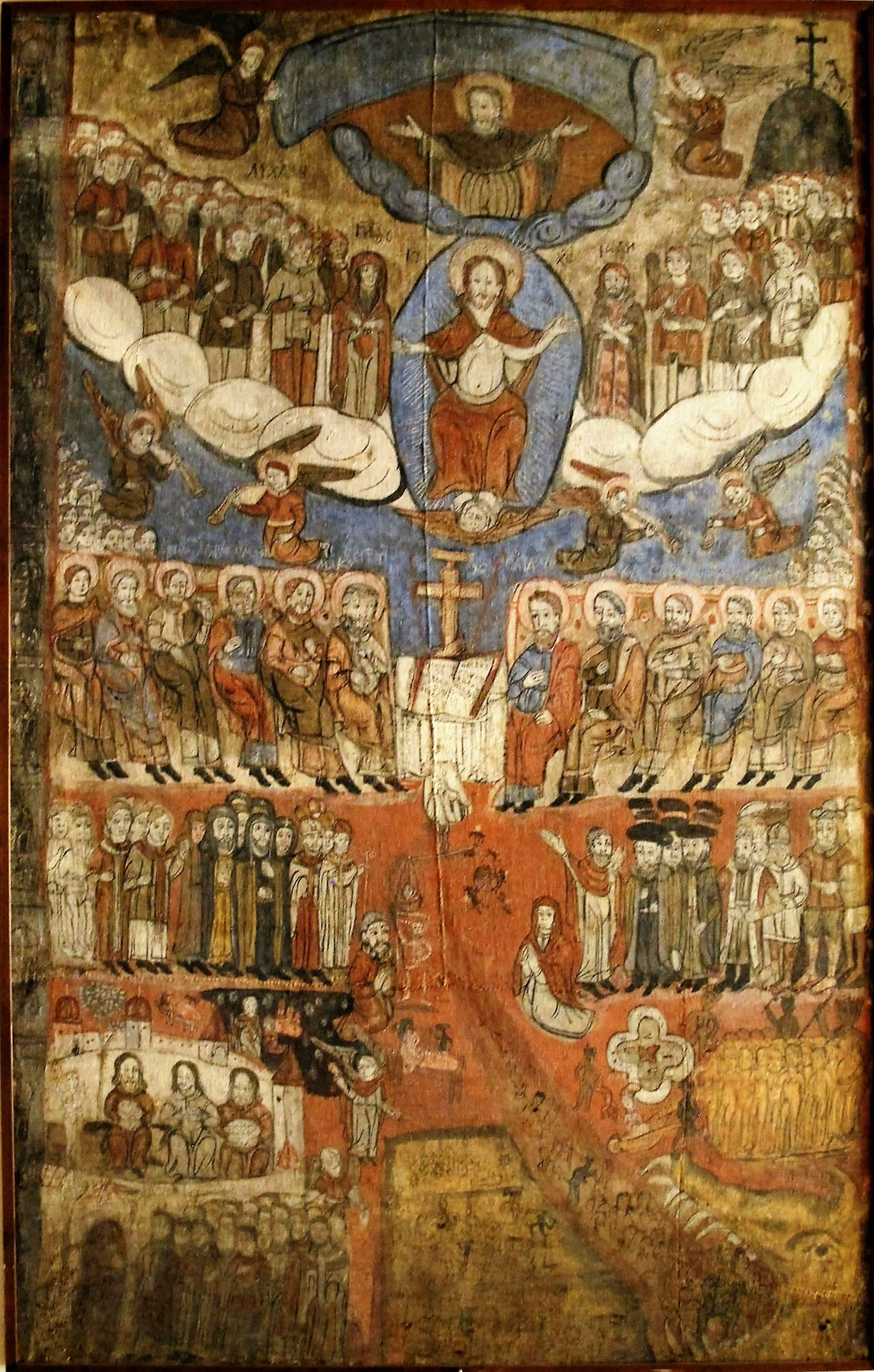
An icon of the Last Judgment, from the Icons and religious art exhibition of the Šariš Museum in Bardejov

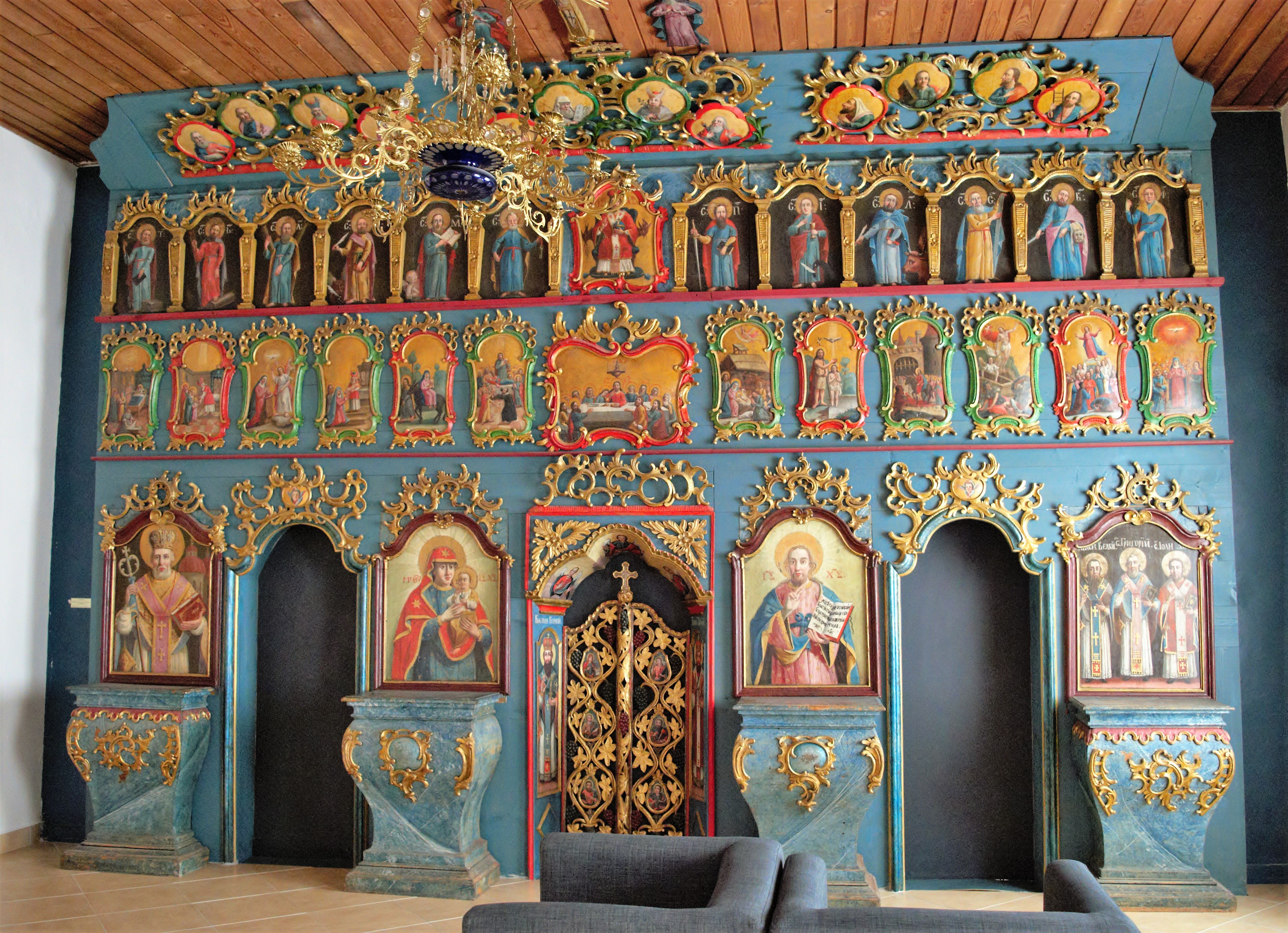
Iconostasis, from the Icons and religious art exhibition of the Šariš Museum in Bardejov

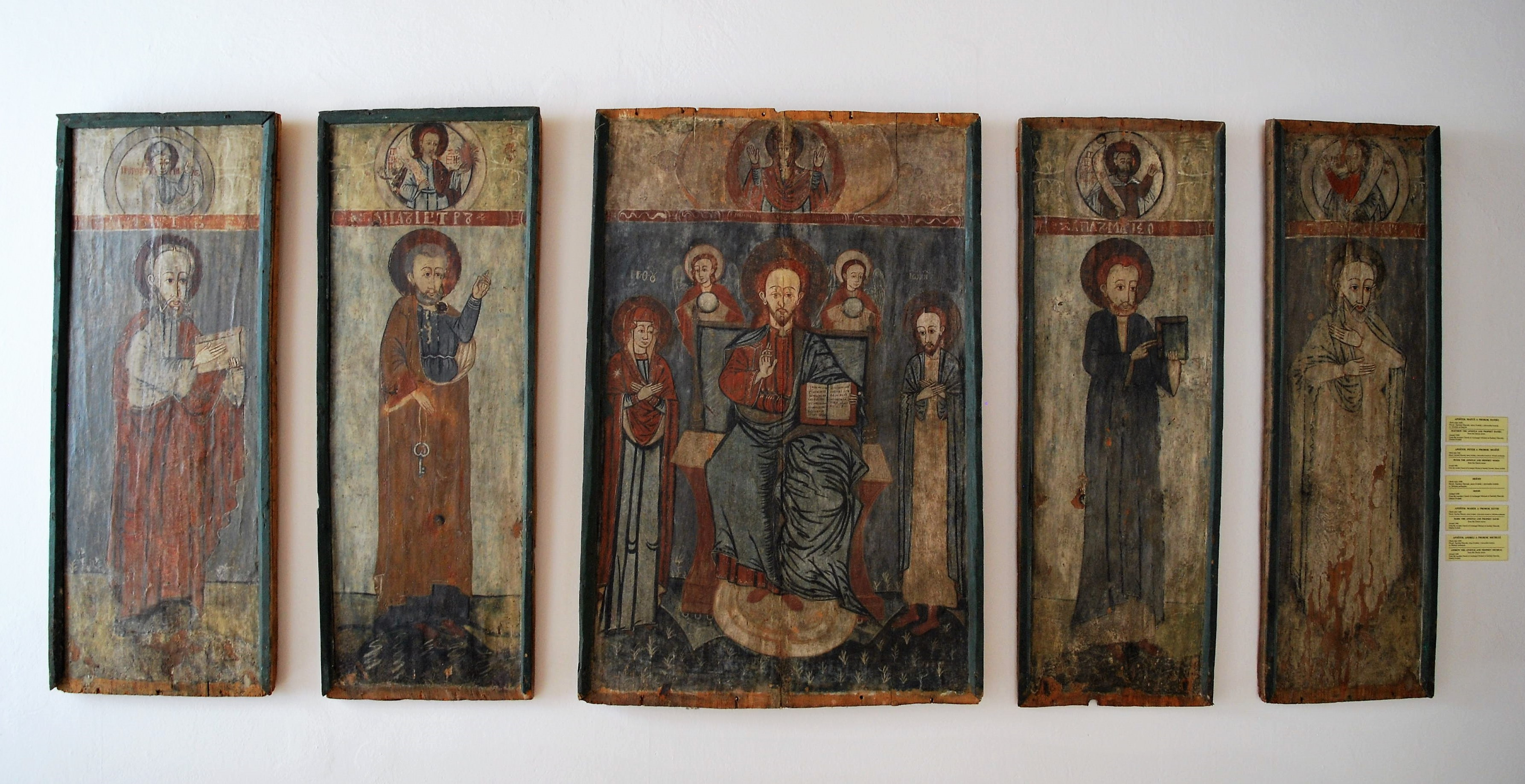
The "Deesis" group of icons, from the Icons and religious art exhibition of the Šariš Museum in Bardejov

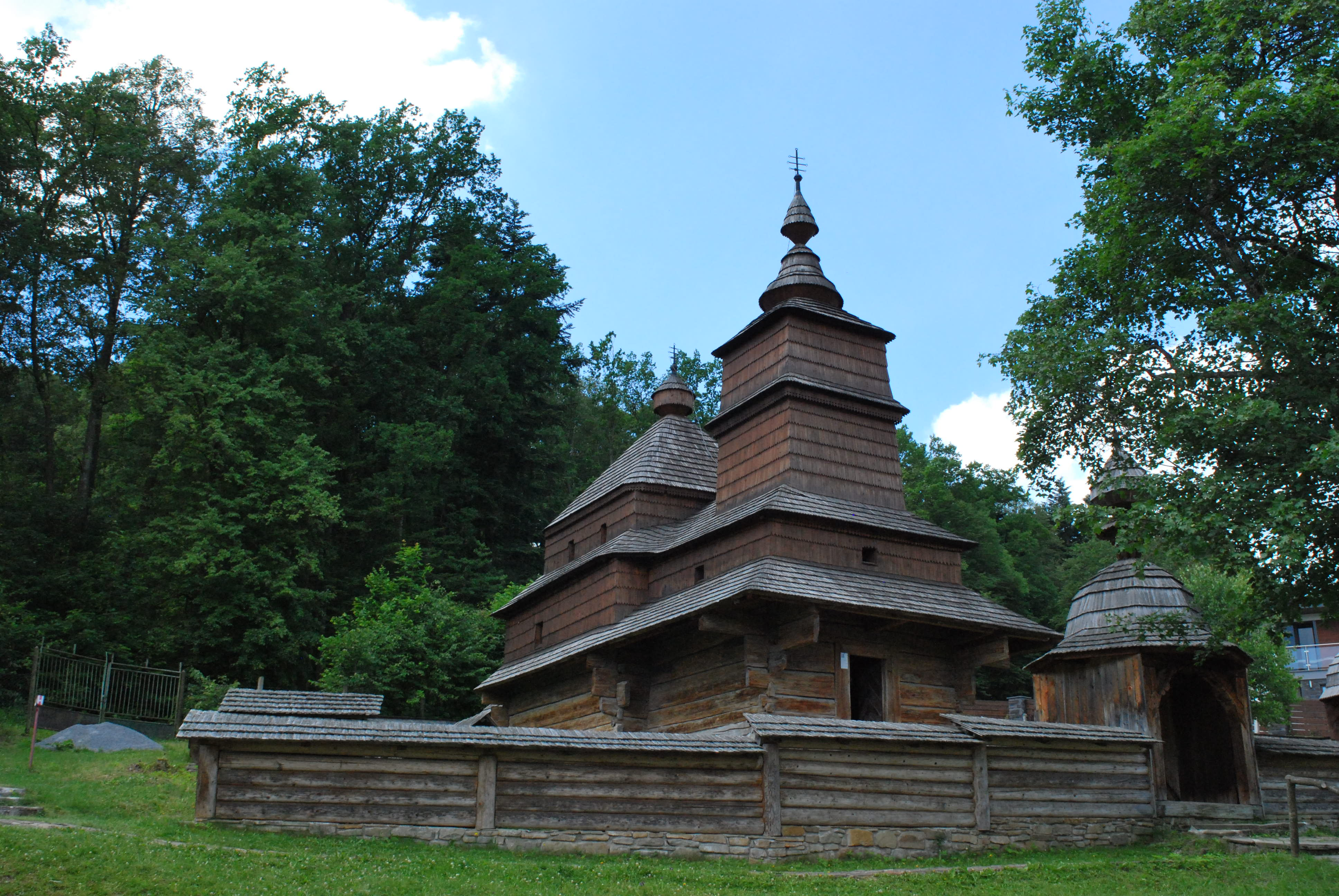
Wooden church exhibited at the open-air museum of folk architecture at Bardejovské Kúpele

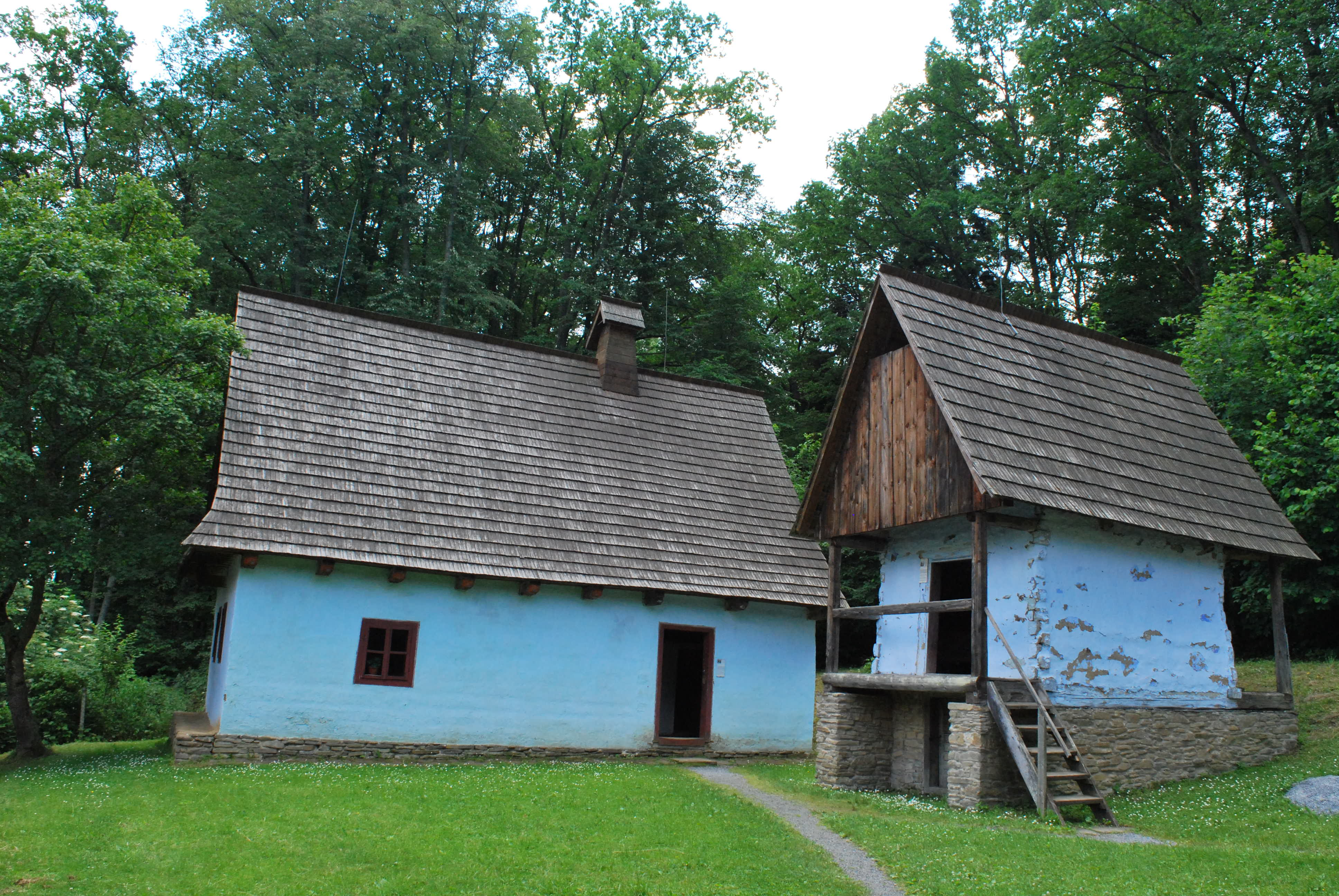
Exhibit (traditional cottage and granary) at the open-air museum in Bardejovské Kúpele

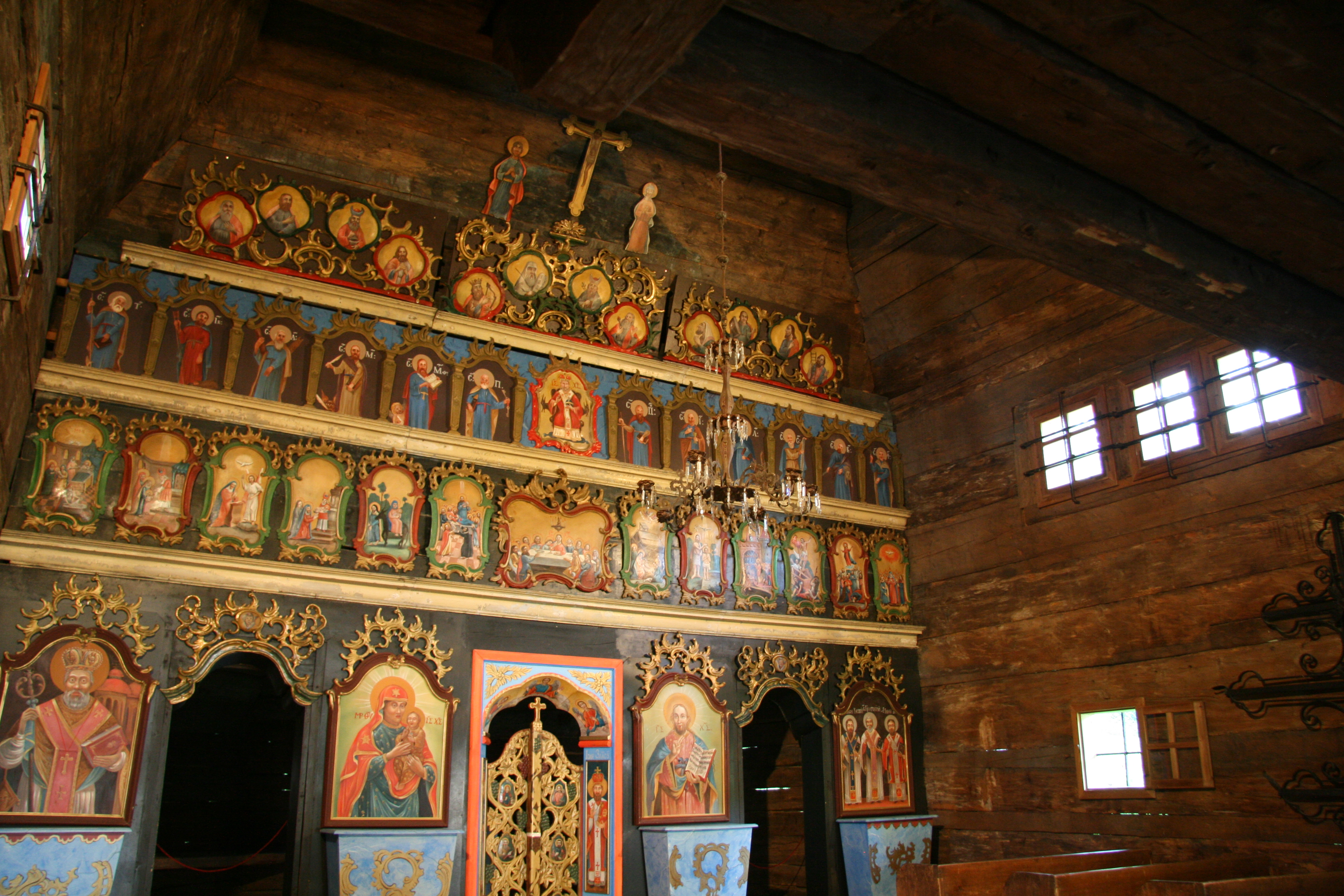
Church interior in the open-air-museum in Bardejovské Kúpele
