= Bogliarka =

- Municipality
- Location of Bogliarka in the Prešov Region Location of Bogliarka in Slovakia
- Coordinates: 49.27°N 21.15°E
- Country: Slovakia
- Region: Prešov Region
- District: Bardejov District
- First mentioned: 1454

Area
  - Total: 9.38 km^{2} (3.62 sq mi)
- Elevation: 445 m (1,460 ft)

Population (2025)
  - Total: 103
- Time zone: UTC+1 (CET)
  - Summer (DST): UTC+2 (CEST)
- Postal code: 860 4
- Area code: +421 54
- Vehicle registration plate (until 2022): BJ
- Website: www.bogliarka.sk

Bogliarka (Rusyn: Боґлярка, romanized: Bogliarka, Hungarian: Boglárka) is a village and municipality in Bardejov District in the Prešov Region of north-east Slovakia.

== History ==
In historical records the village was first mentioned in 1454.

In 1787 the settlement had 25 houses and 225 inhabitants; in 1828 there were 60 houses and 441 inhabitants, who were employed as ash burners, charcoal burners, farmers, sheep and goat keepers, weavers, and forest workers. The vast forests were the property of Count Anhalt in the 19th century.

Until 1918, the village, which lay in Sáros County, belonged to the Kingdom of Hungary, and afterwards became part of Czechoslovakia, and today Slovakia. During the First Czechoslovak Republic, the inhabitants worked as basket makers, farmers, and forest workers. After the Second World War, part of the population commuted to work in industrial enterprises, for example in Košice; the local Unified Agricultural Cooperative (abbreviated JRD) was founded in 1959.

== Geography ==
The municipality lies at an altitude of 445 metres (1,460 ft) and covers an area of 9.38 km^{2} (3.62 sq mi) (2025).

The municipality is located in the northern part of the Čergov Mountains, in the valley of the Slatvinec (also Solotvinec) stream, within the Topľa River basin. The village center lies at an elevation of 443 meters above sea level and is situated 17 kilometers from Bardejov by road.

The neighbouring municipalities are Krivé to the north, Richvald to the east and southeast, Kríže to the south, Lukov to the west, and Kružlov to the northwest.

== Population ==
Population statistic (10 years)
Year	1995	2005	2015	2025
Count	175	148	122	103
Difference		−15.42%	−17.56%	−15.57%

Population statistic
Year	2024	2025
Count	102	103
Difference		+0.98%

It has a population of 103 people (31 December 2025).

=== Ethnicity ===
Census 2021 (1+ %)
Ethnicity	Number	Fraction
Slovak	85	82.52%
Rusyn	48	46.6%
Czech	2	1.94%
Not found out	2	1.94%
Total	103	

In year 2021 was 103 people by ethnicity 85 as Slovak, 48 as Rusyn, 2 as Czech, 2 as Not found out, 1 as Ukrainian, 1 as Moravian and 1 as Hungarian.

Note on population: The difference values of population numbers in the table "Population statistic" and in the sections "Ethnicity" & "Religion" is caused by the use of various statistical methods.

=== Religion ===
Census 2021 (1+ %)
Religion	Number	Fraction
Greek Catholic Church	75	72.82%
Roman Catholic Church	13	12.62%
Evangelical Church	5	4.85%
None	5	4.85%
Eastern Orthodox Church	2	1.94%
Not found out	2	1.94%
Total	103	

In year 2021 was 103 people by religion 75 from Greek Catholic Church, 13 from Roman Catholic Church, 5 from Evangelical Church, 5 from None, 2 from Eastern Orthodox Church, 2 from Not found out and 1 from Ad hoc movements.

== Facilities ==
The village has a public library and a football pitch.

== See also ==
- List of municipalities and towns in Slovakia
