= Hertník =

- Municipality
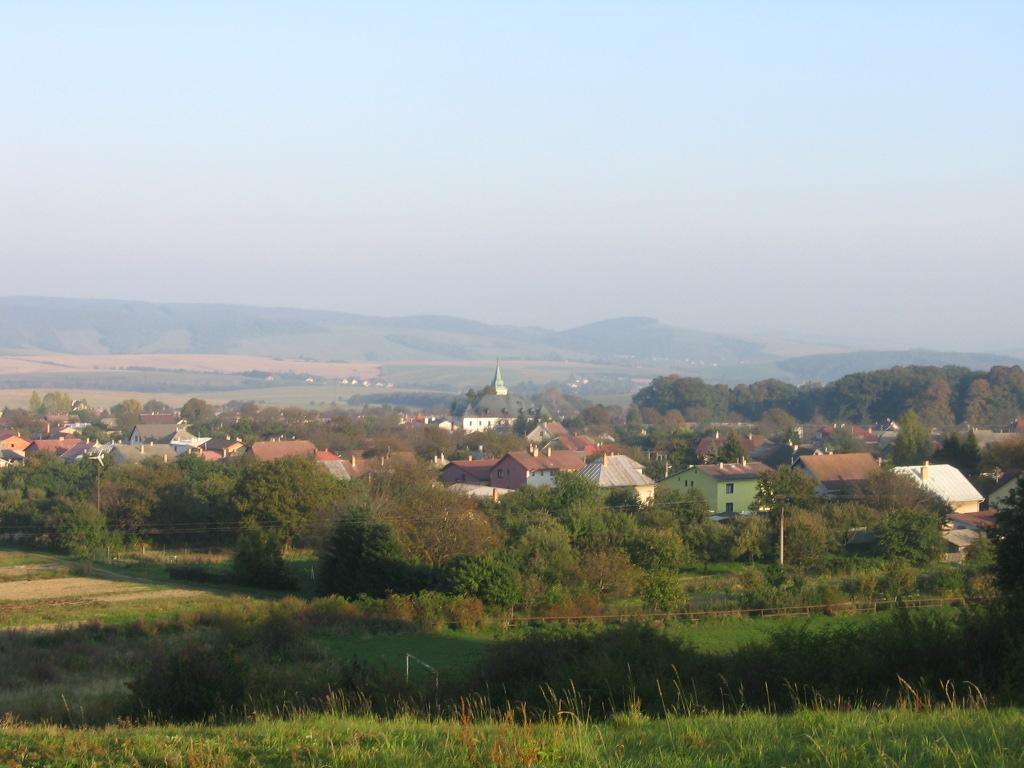
- View of Hertník from the nearby Štembroch hill.

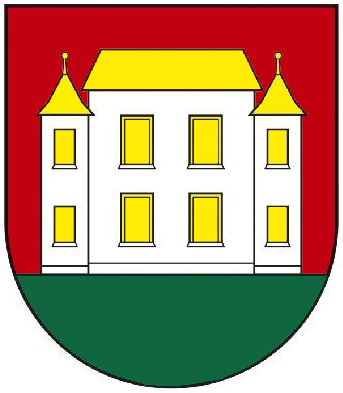
- Flag Coat of arms

- Location of Hertník in the Prešov Region Location of Hertník in Slovakia
- Coordinates: 49.21°N 21.24°E
- Country: Slovakia
- Region: Prešov Region
- District: Bardejov District
- First mentioned: 1351

Government
  - Mayor: Ing. Jozef Semanek

Area
  - Total: 17.97 km^{2} (6.94 sq mi)
- Elevation: 463 m (1,519 ft)

Population (2025)
  - Total: 1,000
- Time zone: UTC+1 (CET)
  - Summer (DST): UTC+2 (CEST)
- Postal code: 864 2
- Area code: +421 54
- Vehicle registration plate (until 2022): BJ
- Website: obechertnik.sk

Hertník (Hungarian: Hertnek) is a village and municipality in Bardejov District in the Prešov Region of north-east Slovakia.

== History ==
Hertník originated around 1300 and is associated with the Mongol invasion of Europe of 1241–1242. Following the invasion, Béla IV of Hungary donated his estates to his patricians. The noblemen of the northern Šariš region initiated resettlement of plundered and decimated areas (some regions experienced 50% loss of the original population) by inviting German colonists. The incoming Germans (mostly from the Baltic Sea area) were usually craftsmen, traders and miners. The arriving Germans settled in or immediately next to the older Slovak settlements. The legacy of German colonization from that era in the eastern Čergov mountains is manifested in German names of the settlements and other geographical features that have survived to the present time. Etymologically, the name Hertník is derived from the German word Herkenecht (meaning master servant); likewise, nearby villages Šiba (Scheibe), Richvald (Reichwald) and Kľušov (Schonwald).

The oldest recorded mention of the village Hertník is from 1351 and can be found in the statement issued by Spišská Kapitula (one of the medieval Hungary's "places of authentication") which confirms that Hertník belonged to the Lords of Perín (Perényi, a noble Hungarian family). Mikuláš from Perín reconfirmed this claim later in a statement issued in 1355 where he declared that Hertník, Šiba, Richvald and Kľušov were in the possession of the Perín family since 1325. Hertník belonged to the Perins until around 1440 when a free royal town of Bardejov became a new owner. In 1442 a Richnava's Bratrík captain Ján Talafúz seized Hertník and other villages from Bardejov. However, in 1446 Hertník was repossessed by Bardejov (the church of Saint Aegidius).

During the following decades (~1480–1553) Hertník changed several owners (János Szapolyai, Ferdinand I, Bernard Baran, Hieronym Lasky and Matej Lobocký). From 1553 until the abolishment of serfdom by Joseph II, Holy Roman Emperor in 1781 Hertník belonged for the most part to the Forgách (Forgáč, Forgács) family.

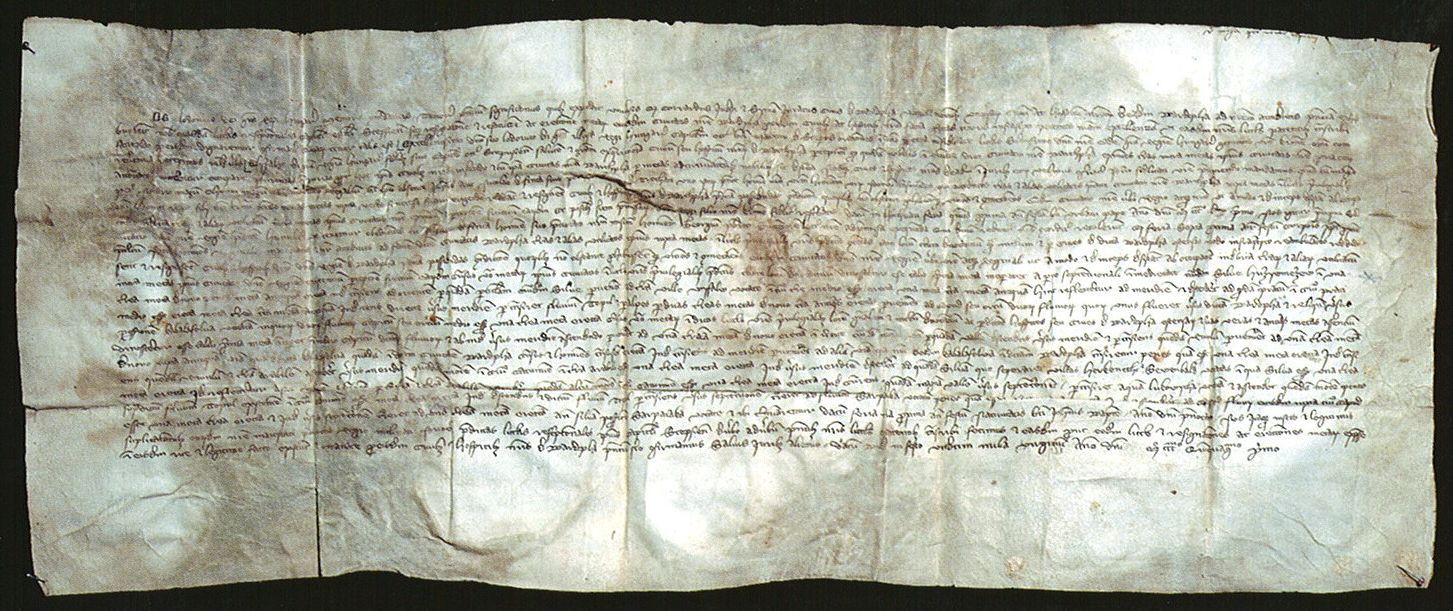
The document of Spišská Kapitula from 1351 is the oldest written reference to Hertník.

== Geography ==
The municipality lies at an altitude of 463 metres (1,519 ft) and covers an area of 17.97 km^{2} (6.94 sq mi) (2025).

== See also ==
- List of municipalities and towns in Slovakia

== Population ==
Population statistic (10 years)
| Year | 1995 | 2005 | 2015 | 2025 |
|---|---|---|---|---|
| Count | 979 | 1013 | 1020 | 1000 |
| Difference | | +3.47% | +0.69% | −1.96% |

Population statistic
| Year | 2024 | 2025 |
|---|---|---|
| Count | 1010 | 1000 |
| Difference | | −0.99% |

It has a population of 1000 people (31 December 2025).

=== Ethnicity ===
Census 2021 (1+ %)
| Ethnicity | Number | Fraction |
|---|---|---|
| Slovak | 1011 | 99.21% |
| Romani | 14 | 1.37% |
| Not found out | 14 | 1.37% |
| Total | 1019 | |

In year 2021 was 1019 people by ethnicity 1011 as Slovak, 14 as Romani, 14 as Not found out, 9 as Rusyn, 3 as Czech, 3 as Ukrainian and 1 as German.

Note on population: The difference values of population numbers in the table "Population statistic" and in the sections "Ethnicity" & "Religion" is caused by the use of various statistical methods.

=== Religion ===
Census 2021 (1+ %)
| Religion | Number | Fraction |
|---|---|---|
| Roman Catholic Church | 952 | 93.42% |
| Greek Catholic Church | 27 | 2.65% |
| None | 22 | 2.16% |
| Total | 1019 | |

In year 2021 was 1019 people by religion 952 from Roman Catholic Church, 27 from Greek Catholic Church, 22 from None, 10 from Evangelical Church, 3 from Eastern Orthodox Church, 3 from Not found out, 1 from Calvinist Church and 1 from Ad hoc movements.

== Genealogical resources ==
The records for genealogical research are available at the state archive "Statny Archiv in Presov, Slovakia"

- Roman Catholic church records (births/marriages/deaths): 1856-1897 (parish A)
- Greek Catholic church records (births/marriages/deaths): 1800-1895 (parish B)
- Lutheran church records (births/marriages/deaths): 1703-1895 (parish B)
