= Križevci (disambiguation) =

Križevci is a town in Koprivnica-Križevci County, central Croatia.

Križevci may also refer to:

== Places ==
Croatia

- Križevci, the old name of the village of Karadžićevo up until 1920

Slovenia

- Križevci, Gornji Petrovci, a village in the Municipality of Gornji Petrovci in northeastern Slovenia (the traditional region of Prekmurje)
- Municipality of Križevci, a municipality in northeastern Slovenia (the traditional region of Prlekija)
  - Križevci pri Ljutomeru, the seat of the municipality

== Other uses ==
- Eparchy of Križevci, part of the Byzantine Church of Croatia, Serbia and Montenegro
- KK Križevci, a basketball club based in Križevci, Croatia
- NK Križevci, a football club based in Križevci, Croatia

== See also ==
- Križevec
- Križe (disambiguation)
- Križ (disambiguation)
