= Kriz =

Kriz may refer to:

Places and jurisdictions

- an oasis in Tunisia, the site of the Ancient city ad modern titular see of Tigias (now Henchir-Taus), which was in the Roman province of Africa Bizacena
- Qrız, village in Azerbaijan

Persons

- Alois Kříž (1911–1947), Czechoslovak journalist and Nazi collaborator who was executed
- Jürgen Kriz, German psychologist
- Kříž, Czech surname

== See also ==
- Križ (disambiguation)
