= Hrastina massacre =

Massacre of Roma people in World War II Croatia

- Part of the Holocaust in the Independent State of Croatia and the Romani Holocaust
- Location: Hrastina, Independent State of Croatia
- Date: 24–25 April 1945
- Target: Sinti and Romani civilians
- Attack type: War crime, ethnic cleansing, genocidal massacre
- Deaths: 43–46 civilians
- Perpetrator: Ustaše
- Motive: Anti-Romani racism and robbery

The Hrastina massacre was the mass murder of a travelling group of Sinti and Romani circus performers by members of the Ustaše, specifically the luburićevci (followers of Vjekoslav Luburić), in the village of Hrastina on the night of 24–25 April 1945. The crime took place during the final weeks of World War II in Yugoslavia and is considered one of the last major atrocities of the Romani Holocaust in Europe.

The victims were members of a travelling circus troupe composed of approximately twelve Sinti families. Between 43 and 46 men, women, and children were killed.

== Background ==
Hrastina and Marija Gorica are nearby villages, near the Croatian–Slovenian border. On 21 March 1945, around 200 Ustaše, members of the 6th Company of the 1st Battalion of the Ustaša Defence Corps, arrived in the village and established their headquarters in the local elementary school. Many members of the unit had previously served as guards at the Jasenovac concentration camp. The company was commanded by the Ustaša officer Josip Kušan.

At roughly the same time, a travelling troupe of Sinti circus performers consisting of twelve families was staying in the nearby village of Kraj Donji. The group performed circus shows for local villagers and travelled with 13 horses, carts, wagons, residential trailers, musical instruments, and circus equipment, as well as a cinema projector and dynamo. They possessed documents issued by Nazi Germany and reportedly presented themselves as Czechs in order to avoid persecution.

On 24 April 1945 one of the troupe's leaders, Stefan Winter, came to Marija Gorica to arrange another performance for local children and members of the Ustaša garrison. The performance was approved and later carried out. The local schoolteacher Berislav Horvatin later testified that he overheard a conversation between Kušan and several of his subordinates in which they expressed envy of the troupe's horses. According to Horvatin, Kušan stated that the horses were "military horses" and that they needed such animals.

The circus performers later stated that the Ustaše treated them politely during the performance. However, after the show ended and the troupe returned to Kraj Donji, Ustaša soldiers followed them, arrested the performers, and transported them back to Marija Gorica.

== Massacre ==
After being taken to Marija Gorica, the performers were locked inside the Ustaša headquarters. During the night villagers reported hearing beatings and the destruction of the victims' property. Witnesses also recalled hearing the cries of children begging not to be beaten.

The prisoners were later transported to the nearby estate of Mihalj Jančić in Hrastina. Jančić and members of his family had joined the Yugoslav Partisans, leaving the property abandoned.

According to testimony given after the war by Petar Pinjuh, one of the Ustaše who participated in the killings, Kušan ordered his men to surround the estate to prevent the prisoners from escaping. Kušan and several associates, including Tomislav Šremer and Mile Matijević, then beat 23 members of the troupe to death. The remaining 20 victims were locked inside Jančić's barn and burned alive. The bodies of those killed outside were thrown into a manure pit on the property.

The Ustaše reportedly guarded the site for several days in order to allow the barn and bodies to burn completely.

== Excavation ==
After the end of the war, local villagers exhumed the remains on the Jančić estate at the initiative of the teacher Berislav Horvatin.

The bodies of men, women, and children were recovered. Several showed dagger wounds to the chest, back, and head. Some of the male victims had their hands tied behind their backs. Many victims were found naked and may have been subjected to sexual violence. Charred body parts were recovered from the burned barn. The excavation was completed on 15 May 1945.

== Sources ==
- Šimunković, Mario; Mihovilović, Đorđe (2021). Masakr nad Romima i Sintima u Hrastini 1945. godine: zločini luburićevaca u zaprešićkom kraju [Massacre of Roma and Sinti in Hrastina in 1945: Crimes of Luburić's men in the Zaprešić area] (in Croatian). Jasenovac: Javna ustanova Spomen-područje Jasenovac. ISBN 978-953-7895-13-6.
