= Šepulje =

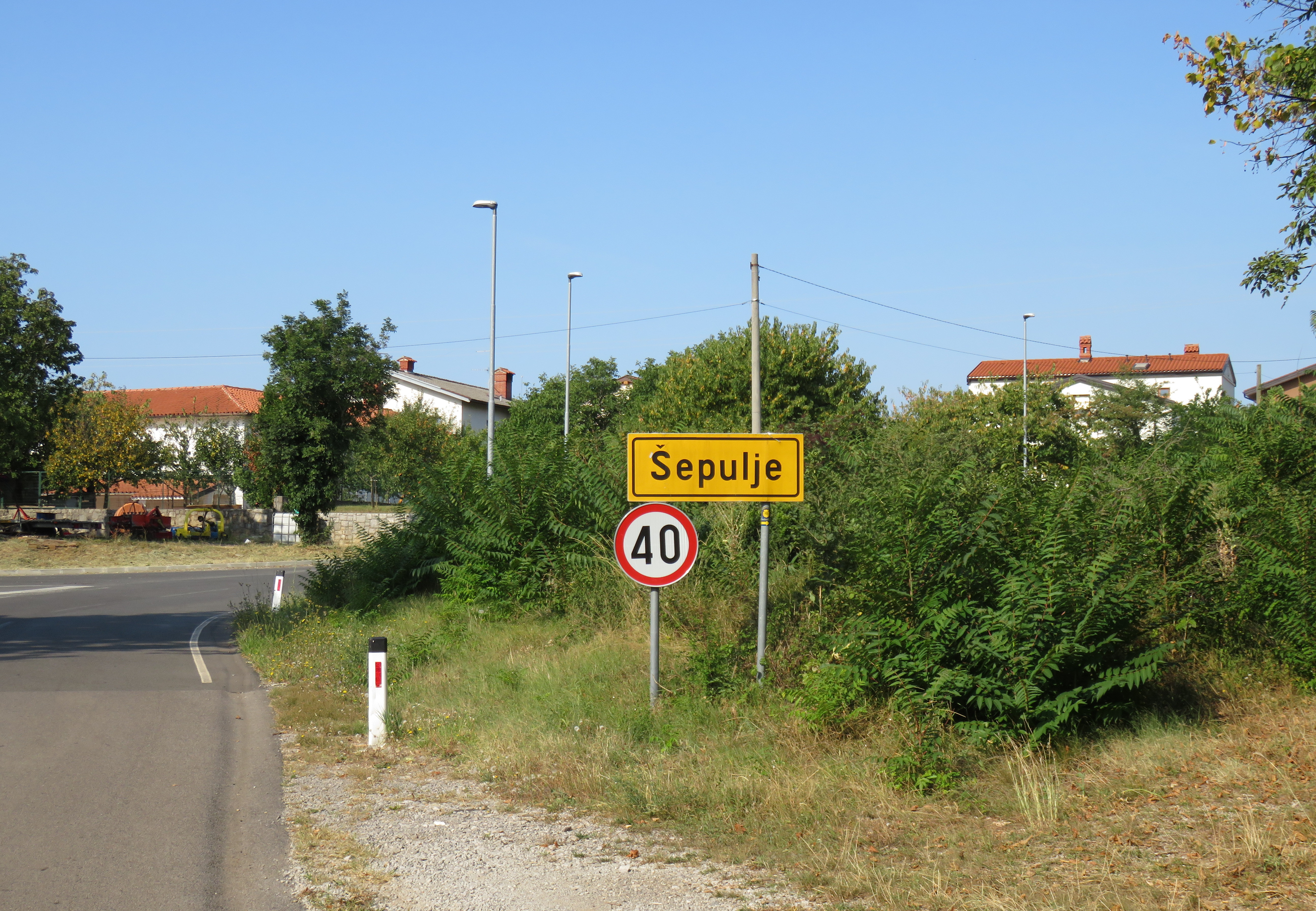

- Location in Slovenia
- Coordinates: 45°45′2.39″N 13°52′8.53″E
- Country: Slovenia
- Traditional region: Littoral
- Statistical region: Coastal–Karst
- Municipality: Sežana

Area
  - Total: 2.16 km^{2} (0.83 sq mi)
- Elevation: 356.1 m (1,168 ft)

Population (2022)
  - Total: 123

Šepulje (pronounced [ʃɛˈpuːljɛ]) is a village next to Križ in the Municipality of Sežana in the Littoral region of Slovenia.

The local church, built about 1 km southeast of the village, is dedicated to Saint Anthony and belongs to the Parish of Tomaj.
