= Križ =

Križ ("Cross" in several Slavic languages) may refer to:

== Croatia ==
- Križ, Zagreb County, a village and municipality in Zagreb County, Croatia
- Križ Brdovečki, a village near Marija Gorica, Croatia
- Križ Hrastovački, a village near Petrinja, Croatia
- Križ Kamenica, a village near Brinje, Croatia
- Križ Koranski, a village near Barilović, Croatia

== Slovenia ==
- Križ, Komenda, a village in Slovenia
- Križ, Sevnica, a village in Slovenia
- Križ, Sežana, a village in Slovenia
- Križ, Trebnje, a village in Slovenia

== See also ==
- Cross (disambiguation)
- Kriz (disambiguation)
