= Utovlje =

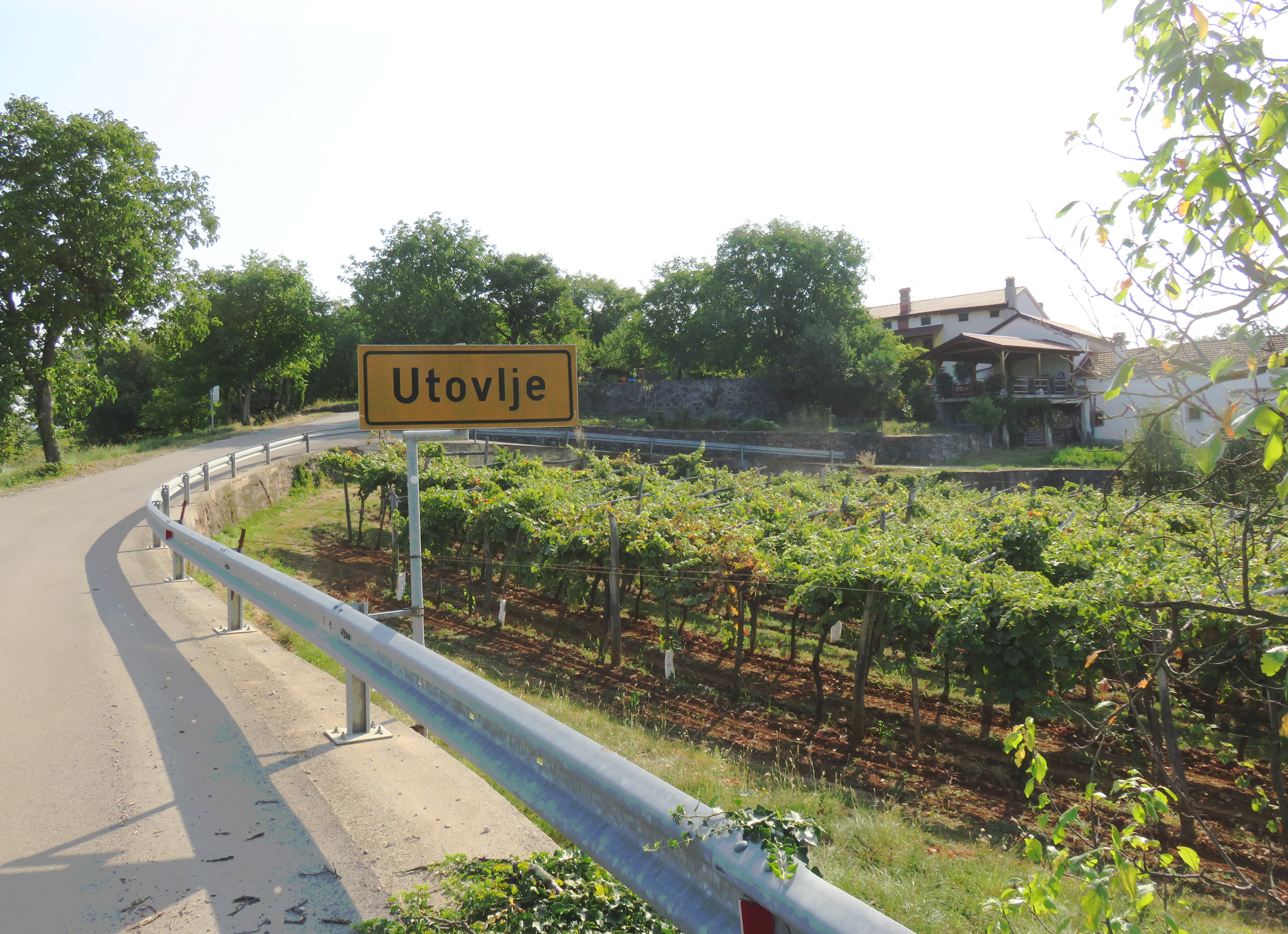

- Location in Slovenia
- Coordinates: 45°45′17.47″N 13°52′59.59″E
- Country: Slovenia
- Traditional region: Littoral
- Statistical region: Coastal–Karst
- Municipality: Sežana

Area
  - Total: 2.11 km^{2} (0.81 sq mi)
- Elevation: 344.2 m (1,129 ft)

Population (2002)
  - Total: 37

Utovlje (pronounced [ˈuːtɔu̯ljɛ]; Italian: Uttoglie) is a village northeast of Križ in the Municipality of Sežana in the Littoral region of Slovenia.

== Church ==
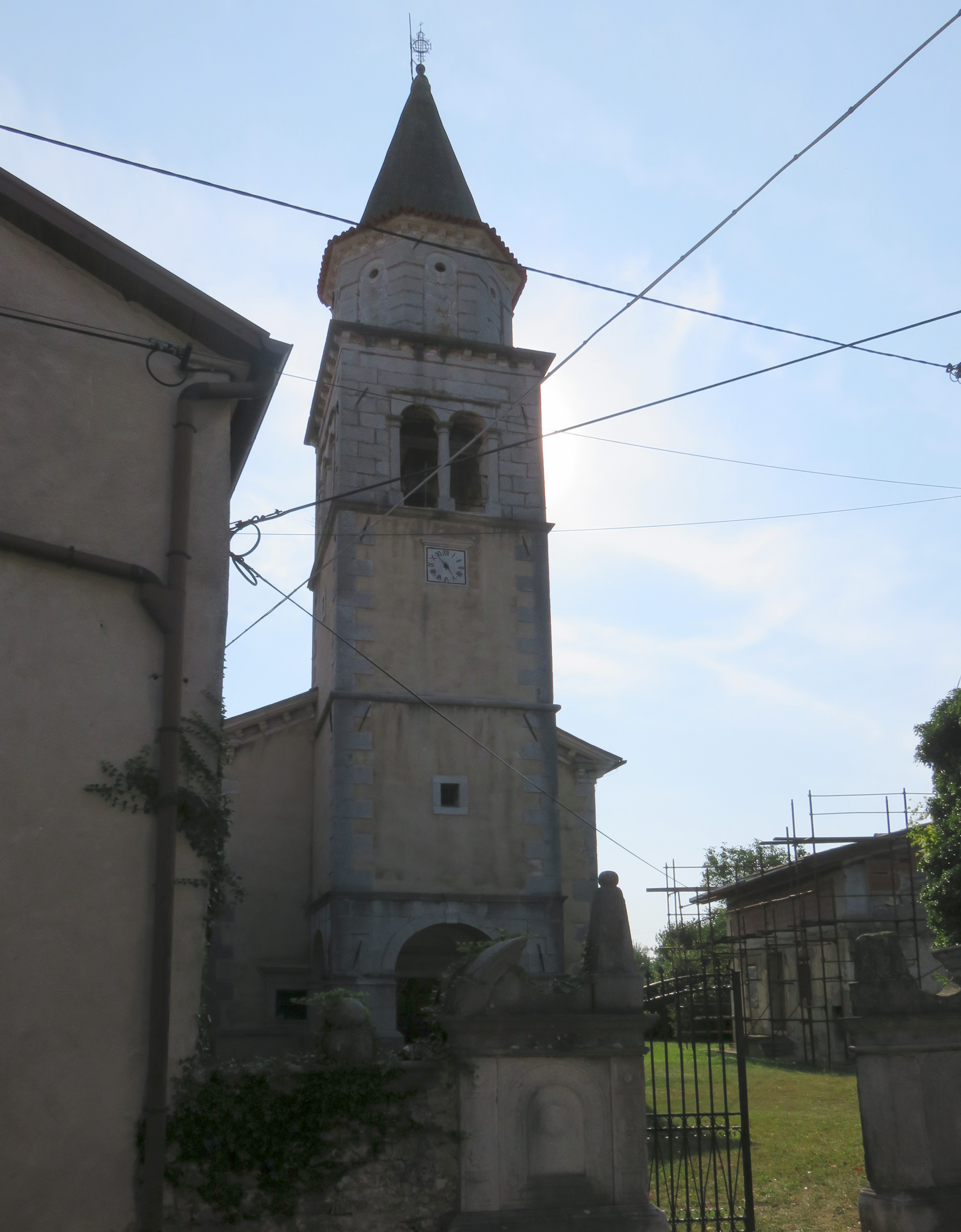
Saint Justus's Church

The local church is dedicated to Saint Justus and belongs to the Parish of Tomaj.
