= Križe =

Križe may refer to:

- Kríže, a village in Slovakia
- Križe, Brežice, a village in Slovenia
- Križe, Novo Mesto, a village in Slovenia
- Križe, Tržič, a village in Slovenia

== See also ==
- Križ (disambiguation)
