= Person-centered systems theory =

The person-centered systems theory (German: Personzentrierte Systemtheorie) is a multi-level concept aiming at the reconstruction and explanation of human experience, action and interaction processes in such a way that inappropriate reductions to the focus of individual therapeutic schools of thought are avoided as far as possible. It has been developed by the German psychologist and psychotherapist Jürgen Kriz.

The approach takes into account findings and aspects from different discourses – especially from humanistic psychotherapy, synergetics, Gestalt psychology, biosemiotics as well as evolutionary psychology.

Person-centered systems theory is, as Kriz emphasizes, neither a method nor a toolbox of methods. Its aim is to provide a theoretical foundation for integrating the valuable contributions of individual "schools" with more recent findings from other scientific disciplines.

== Four process levels ==
At the center of the person-centered systems theory is the human being in their everyday world with the necessary interest in creating a tangible, meaningfully organized world from the incomprehensible complexity of a (physico-chemical) stimulus world. Kriz assigns the multitude of relevant processes to four process levels. However, he underlines that this is a purely analytical distinction, because influences from all four process levels on living and acting are effective at every moment. In addition, further processes may be distinguished depending on the respective question. The following four levels are to be regarded as the minimum of what must be taken into account in order not to systematically disregard essential effects.

=== a) Psychological processes ===
This is the main level on which people generate meaning and significance. Humans are connected to the world through perceptions and actions; through thought and emotive processes they evaluate these processes and can observe themselves.

=== b) Interpersonal processes ===
This level deals with micro-social structures of couples, families or teams for whom face-to-face communication is typical. Terms such as "interaction patterns" or "communicative structures" indicate that the meaning of expressions and their contribution to mutual cooperation are negotiated in joint interaction. Everybody believes to know the expectations of the others and is influenced or even guided by these expectations. It is a network of mutual insinuations that stabilizes "reality" even when much of it is not true. Since these tacit assumptions are rarely talked about, the chances of correction are rather low. Everyday experience, as well as research, show how people often experience themselves as victims of others or of circumstances, although they themselves (unconsciously) contribute to maintaining this pattern.

Psychotherapy, counseling, and coaching usually look at the processes on levels (a) and (b) and often also at their interactions. However, the influences of two other process levels are largely neglected:

=== c) Cultural processes ===
Usually, people have not – neither individually nor interpersonally – invented the meaning of words and sentences, the expectations of fellow human beings, the inner images, "how living together works", and so on. Rather, different cultures and subcultures convey meanings that significantly influence the processes of (a) and (b). Clues about the meaning of events in the "here and now" are deduced from the media, conversation with colleagues at work, and from other non-family sources. These influences remain to a large extent unconscious.

The impact of the cultural level, which constantly affects people, is by no means limited to cultural events – i.e. to what is happening in organizations, in legislation, or in the mass media. Rather, the socio-cultural aspects essentially concern the way in which persons see and understand themselves, their fellow human beings, and the "world". This becomes particularly clear when considering the interdependencies of levels (a) and (c): If human beings want to understand themselves in their feelings, thoughts and actions, then they have to use the "cultural tools" of their social environment. This is especially true when it comes to their very own, innermost "subjective" processes (affects, perceptions, etc.).

The effects of the cultural process level remain largely hidden from everyday consciousness. They are, however, essential components of the structures in human expectations of the world and of others as well as their own expectations of what others expect of them.

=== d) Bodily processes ===
In accordance with Ciompi's affect logic, Kriz highlights that at any given moment both cognitive-psychic and affective processes occur simultaneously in the human organism. Because of the slower change of biochemical parameters, the affective processes form the framework for the rapidly changing cognitive processes with their bioelectric basis. Furthermore, the implicit knowledge of the human organism, which originates from early experiences as well as from evolutionary preformations, is of great relevance. This has long been underestimated, but is now discussed under the term "social brain".

Humans are hardly aware of many of these structuring effects of the bodily processes on what is described under (a) and (b). Nevertheless – or precisely because of this – these processes have a very strong effect.

== Stability, instability, and the interaction of the four process levels ==
Kriz understands symptoms and problems with which people come into psychotherapy, counseling, or coaching as over-stable process patterns. These were mostly appropriate and functional in earlier stages of development, but have not adapted to new conditions. This is because human development – both at the level of the individual and in social systems – consists of repeatedly abandoning effective process patterns whenever new developmental challenges arise. For example, different patterns of interaction are required at the family level depending on whether a child has just been born, is in kindergarten or school, reaches puberty, is starting professional training, and so on. The same applies to the organization of the psychological processes of the child itself. Also, companies have to change their structure and processes because the business environment is constantly evolving.

=== Meaning attractors ===
For psychotherapy, counseling, and coaching, the question of stability – or over-stability – as well as change and new adaptation is essential. The model for understanding these phenomena is the interdisciplinary systems theory of synergetics, which in turn derives from the theory of non-linear dynamic systems. It deals with self-organization processes in which a large number of components form orders or patterns which then react upon the further developmental dynamics of the components. Such dynamic stabilities or orders are called attractors. Person-centered systems theory though is not concerned with phenomena for which energetic processes are important. Rather, it is about psychosocial phenomena of the natural sciences for which sense and meaning are essential. Kriz, therefore, uses a structural-scientific version of synergetics as a model basis. He specifies the attractors as meaning attractors (German: Sinnattraktor), which he describes as reduction of the vast possibilities of understanding and communication providing certainty and stability while limiting change, adaptation, and creativity. Accordingly, the task of psychotherapy, counseling, and coaching would be to support the change of over-stable meaning attractors (which show up as symptoms and problems in psychological and interactive processes) in their adaptation to developmental tasks. This takes place in a phase transition – a transition from one state of order to another. Symptomatic or painful orders are destabilized so that new orders can emerge that are better able to cope with the new conditions.

=== Bottom-up and Top-down ===
Stability, instability, and order-order transitions (phase transitions) can be described in detail within the framework of synergetics. Self-organized orders or attractors thus arise from feedback processes between a micro and a macro level. In terms of perception, this has been illustrated by Gestalt psychology already a hundred years ago using the phenomenon of a "melody". A melody emerges "bottom-up" from tones. At the same time, however, this melody affects the perception of the tones "top-down". For example, one and the same physical tone is perceived either as a "soothing tonic" or as a "tension-laden dominant", depending on the context of the melody. Similarly, words create certain meaningful connections with another person (bottom-up), whereby the meaning of further words is understood in the context of these connections (top-down).

=== Complex interaction ===
The basic conditions for self-organized orders (i.e. the attractors) are set by the environment of a system. In person-centered systems theory, the environmental conditions are represented on each level by the respective other levels, which results in a complex interaction of all levels.

== Complementarity of objective and subjective perspectives ==
Kriz emphasizes the relevance of a distinction between objective and subjective perspectives and at the same time highlights their complementarity. In natural science, objects have neither the ability to reflect and interpret their situation nor to act accordingly. Hence, scientific synergetics is primarily concerned with the relationship between a self-organizing system and its environment. This is fundamentally different when dealing with humans. Therefore, the question always arises whether it is about environmental conditions, as described by observers (or scientists, therapists), or about those conditions as experienced by the clients themselves. This question of perspective was already discussed by biosemiotics a century ago and, in relation to the world of animals, led to the distinction between environment and Umwelt. For the human realm, however, the term "Lebenswelt" (lifeworld) is preferred to Umwelt. Lebenswelt is characterized above all by an inexhaustible supply of intersubjectively agreed symbols, which makes the human being an "animal symbolicum".

The different perspectives explain why objective findings of diagnostics often have little to do with the subject's sensitivities. This also applies to the objectively determined (or officially prescribed) requirements of a person as opposed to what someone feels that it is needed. Both perspectives are important for understanding and cannot be played off against each other. Kriz criticizes that many concepts such as "stress" or "resources" are often described primarily on the basis of "objective" factors such as noise or money, while actually other aspects like lack of appreciation may be relevant to the subject's experience and actions.

== Selected bibliography ==
- Kriz, Jürgen (2017). Subjekt und Lebenswelt. Personzentrierte Systemtheorie für Psychotherapie, Beratung und Coaching (Subject and lifeworld. Person-centered systems theory for psychotherapy, counseling and coaching). Göttingen: Vandenhoeck & Ruprecht, ISBN 978-3-525-49163-8.
- Kriz, Jürgen (2013). Person-Centred Approach and Systems Theory. In: Cornelius-White, Jeffrey H.D.; Motschnig, Renate; Lux, Michael, eds.: Interdisciplinary Handbook of the Person-Centered Approach: Research and Theory. New York: Springer, 261–276.
- Kriz, Jürgen (2009). Cognitive and Interactive Patterning: Processes of creating meaning. In: Valsiner, Jaan; Molenaar, Peter C. M.; Lyra, Maria C. D. P.; Chaudhary, Nandita, eds.: Dynamic Process Methodology in the Social and Developmental Sciences. New York: Springer, 619–650.
- Kriz, Jürgen (2008). Self-Actualization: Person-Centred Approach and Systems Theory. PCCS-books. Ross-on-Wye, UK.
- Cornelius-White, Jeffrey H.D.; Kriz, Jürgen (2008). The Formative Tendency: Person-centred Systems Theory, Interdependence and Human Potential. In: Levitt, Brian E., ed.: Reflections on human potential: bridging the person-centered approach and positive psychology. Ross-on-Wye (UK): PCCS-books, 116–130.
- Kriz, Jürgen (2001). Self-Organization of Cognitive and Interactional Processes. In: Matthies, M.; Malchow, H.; Kriz, J., eds.: Integrative Systems Approaches to Natural and Social Dynamics. Heidelberg: Springer, 517–537.
- Kriz, Jürgen (1993). Pattern Formation in Complex Cognitive Processes. In: Haken, Hermann; Mikhailov, A., eds.: Interdisciplinary Approaches to Nonlinear Complex Systems. Berlin/Heidelberg: Springer, 161–175.
- Kriz, Jürgen (1991). Mental Health: Its Conception in Systems Theory. An Outline of the Person-Centered System Approach. In: Pelaez, Manual J., ed.: Comparative Sociology of Family, Health & Education. Vol. 20, Malaga, Spain: University of Malaga, 6061–6083.
