= Hrastina =

Coordinates: 45°54′24″N 15°44′17″E

- Interactive map of Hrastina

Hrastina is a village near Marija Gorica, Croatia. In the 2021 census, it had 144 inhabitants.

In 1945, it was the site of the Hrastina massacre.
