= Baruničina ljubav =

1877 novel by Ante Kovačić

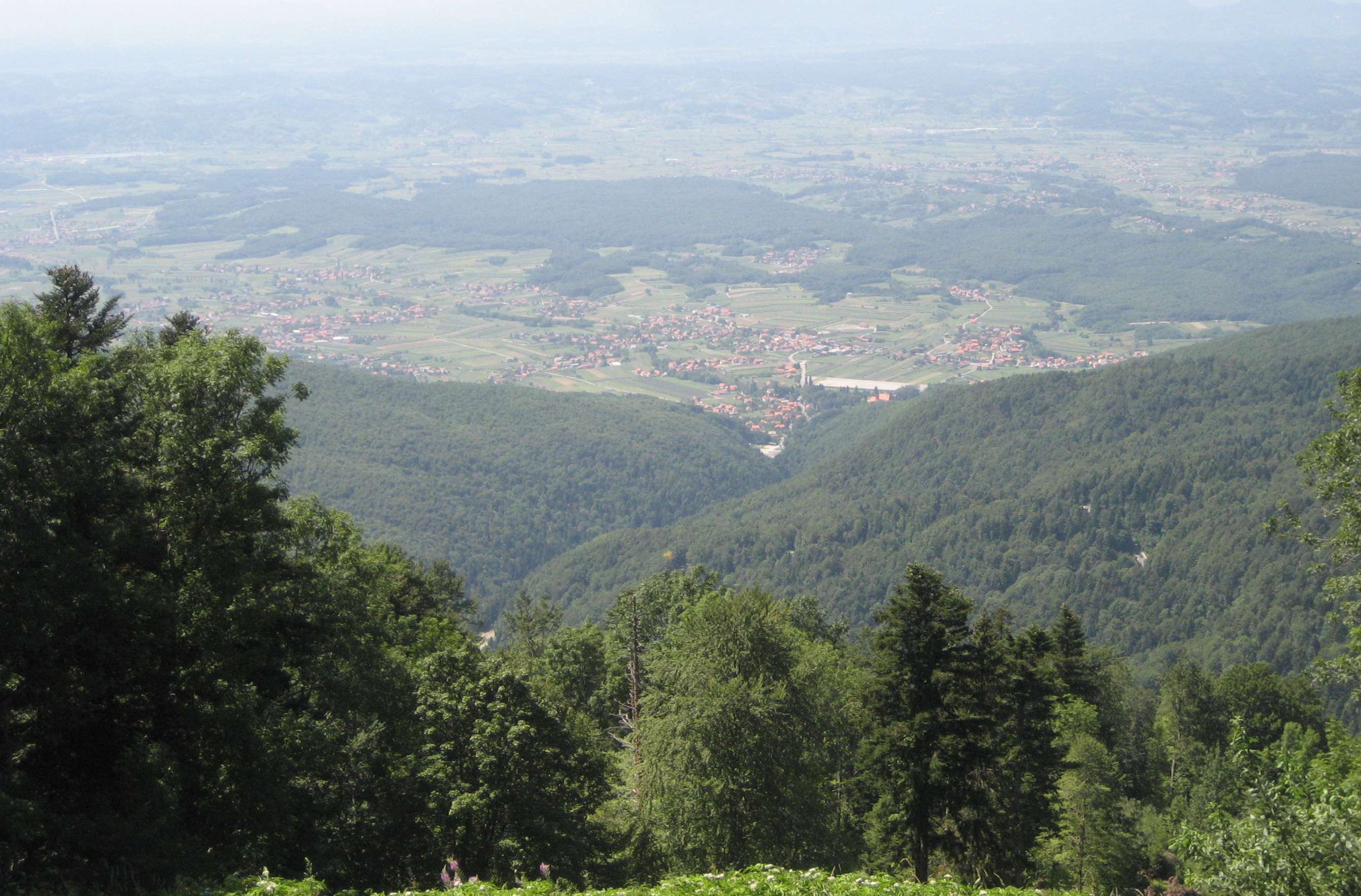
Baruničina ljubav is set in Hrvatsko Zagorje

Baruničina ljubav (pronounced [baruniʧina ʎubaʋ]; Croatian for 'Baroness' Love') is a novel written by Croatian writer Ante Kovačić. He dedicated this novel to his wife Milka, naming one character after her.

Baruničina ljubav was published in 1877 and appeared in Vijenac (literary magazine).

Kovačić discussed Baruničina ljubav with Rikard Jorgovanić in 1878.

When he was writing Baruničina ljubav, Kovačić was influenced by Eugène Sue and French novelist Honoré de Balzac. He described the Oedipus complex.

Kovačić was born in Hrvatsko Zagorje and wanted to describe that region in his works. He described it in Baruničina ljubav perfectly.

== Characters ==
- Baroness Sofija Martinić (née Grefštein)
- Ivan Martinić – Sofija’s husband
- Pavao Lanosović – son of Sofija and Ivan, adopted by farmers and seduced by his mother
- Milka Stalićeva
- Mirko Stalić – Milka’s father and Ivan’s best friend
- Julijo Krčelić – Sofija’s lover
- Jakob – servant
