= Trstenik, Zagreb County =

Trstenik
- Village
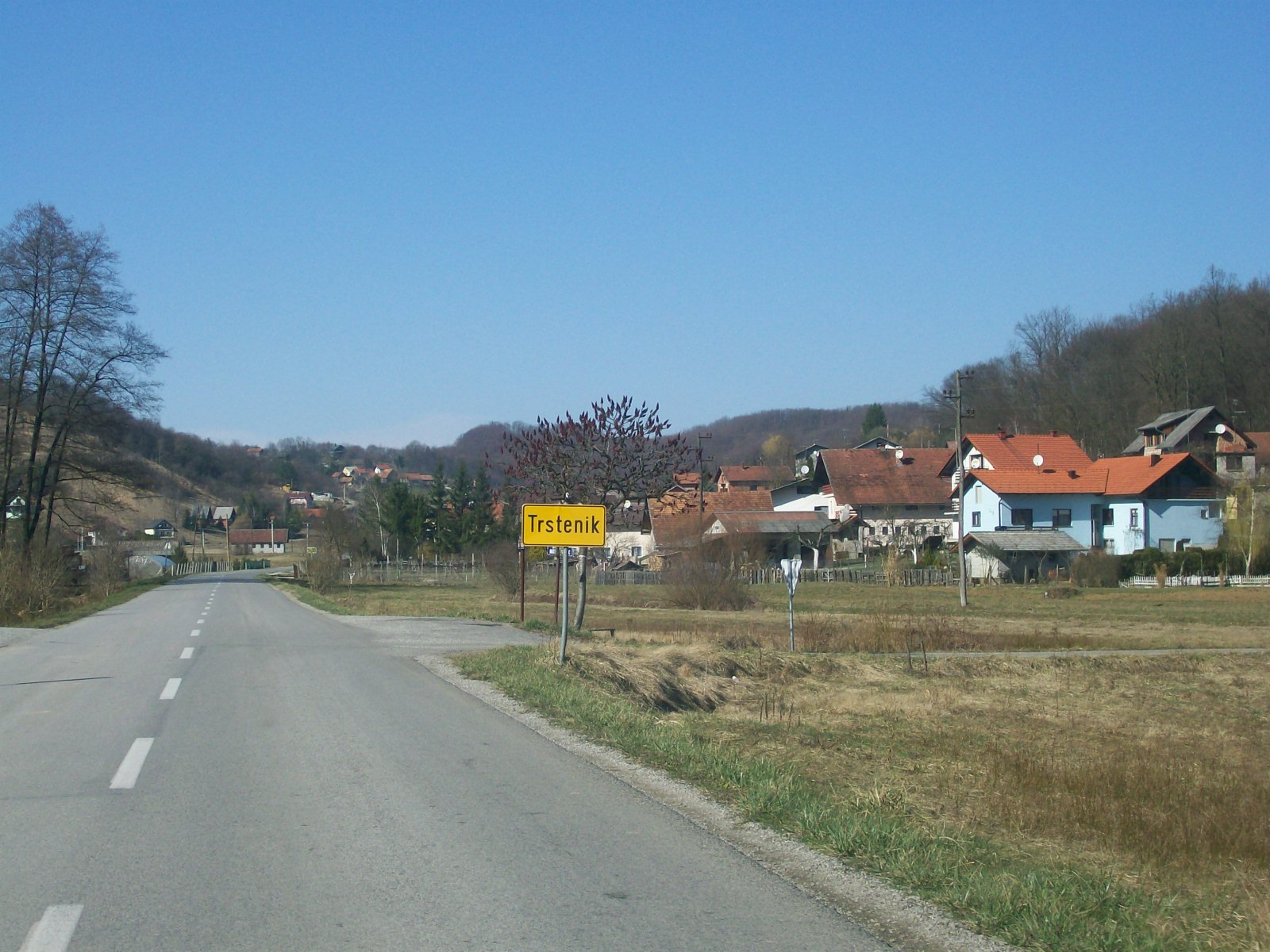
- Street of Trstenik village, Marija Gorica, Croatia
- Interactive map of Trstenik
- Location within Croatia
- Coordinates: 45°54′N 15°45′E
- Country: Croatia
- County: Zagreb County
- Municipality: Marija Gorica

Area
  - Total: 2.7 km^{2} (1.0 sq mi)

Population (2021)
  - Total: 335
  - Density: 120/km^{2} (320/sq mi)
- Time zone: UTC+1 (CET)
  - Summer (DST): UTC+2 (CEST)

Trstenik is a village in central Croatia.
