= Ante Kovačić =

Croatian writer

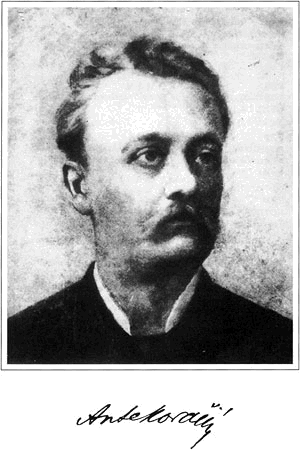
- Ante Kovačić
- Born: Antun Kovačić; 6 June 1854; Celine Goričke near Marija Gorica, Kingdom of Croatia, Austrian Empire
- Died: 10 March 1889 (aged 34); Vrapče, Zagreb, Kingdom of Croatia-Slavonia, Austria-Hungary
- Spouse: Milka Hajdin
- Children: 3
- Parent(s): Ana Vugrinec; Ivan Kovačić

Antun "Ante" Kovačić (6 June 1854 – 10 March 1889) was a Croatian writer who is best known for his magnum opus work U registraturi.

== Biography ==
=== Early life ===
Born to a family of Croatian peasants in Hrvatsko Zagorje, Kovačić made his way through law school to become an attorney. He was born in Celine Goričke, a village near Marija Gorica.

His parents were Ana Vugrinec and Ivan Kovačić (1826–1906). They were married in Marija Gorica. Ivan was also called Janko and dreamed that Ante would become a priest.

In 1857, Ante and his parents went to Oplaznik.

=== Later life ===
Kovačić began to write in 1875. While his early works have Romantic tendencies, in later years he was influenced by Realist literature. His stories and novels often had strong satiric overtones and represent harsh criticism to injustice in Croatian society of his time. One of his novels, Među žabari, remained unfinished because citizens of Karlovac protested after reading its first paragraphs in a local newspaper.

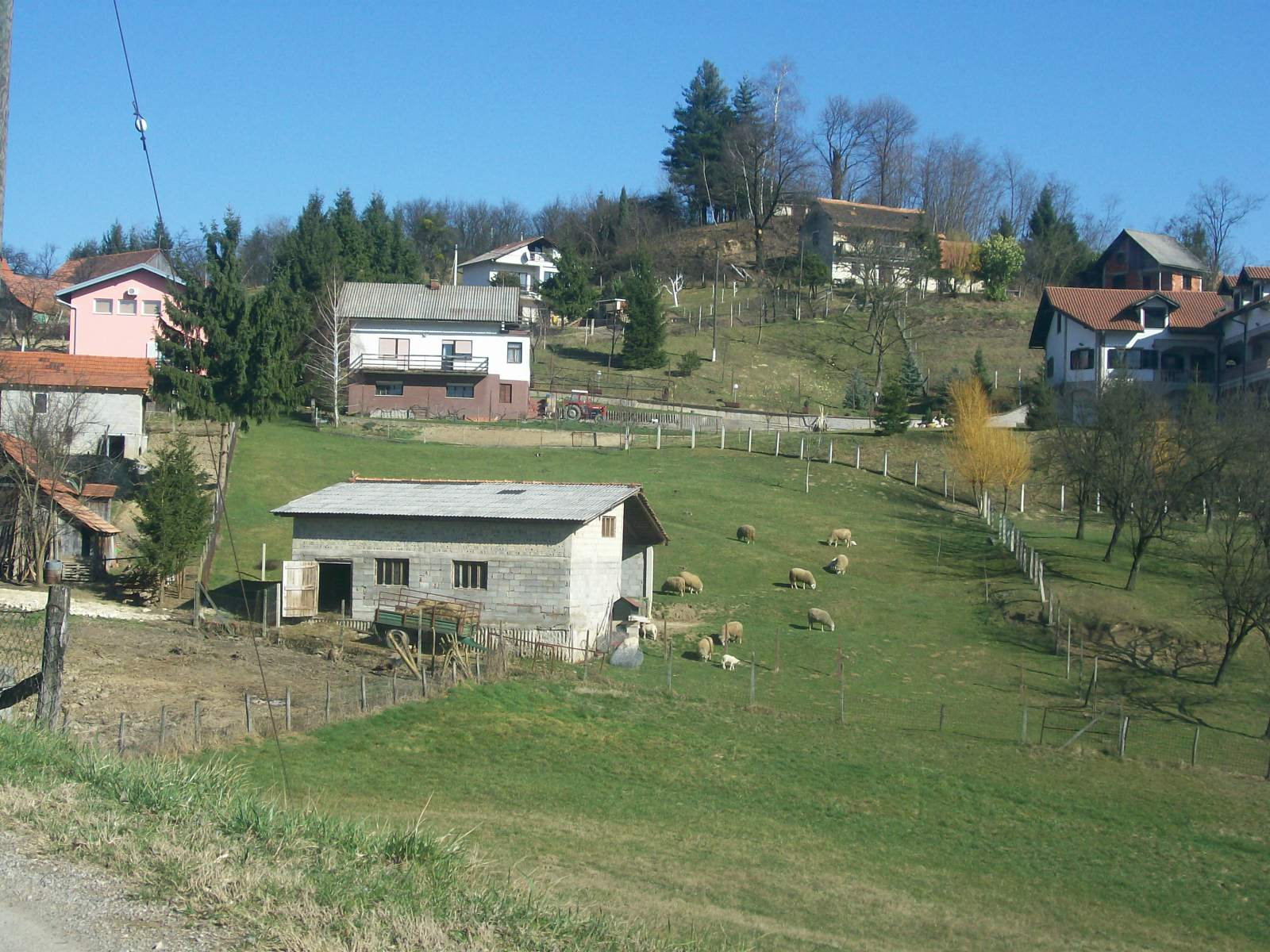
Celine Goričke, where Kovačić was born

The best known work of Ante Kovačić is semi-autobiographic novel U registraturi (1888). In it he expressed great deal of sympathy for common Croatian people, most notably peasants whom he saw as superior to snobbish citizenry.

Kovačić was known as a staunch supporter of Ante Starčević and his Croatian Party of Rights. As such he was bitterly opposed to Ivan Mažuranić and wrote literal travesty of Mažuranić's poem The Death of Smail-aga Čengić.

In his later years, Kovačić began to show symptoms of mental disorder which gradually affected his work, including the last chapters of U registraturi.

U registraturi, combining biting social satire, naturalist descriptions of Croatian bureaucracy and peasantry, as well as fascination with the supernatural inherited from Romanticism, nevertheless remained the most powerful 19th century Croatian novel and one of the most enduring novels in Croatian history. In 1974 it was adapted into popular television mini-series starring Rade Šerbedžija.

=== Death ===
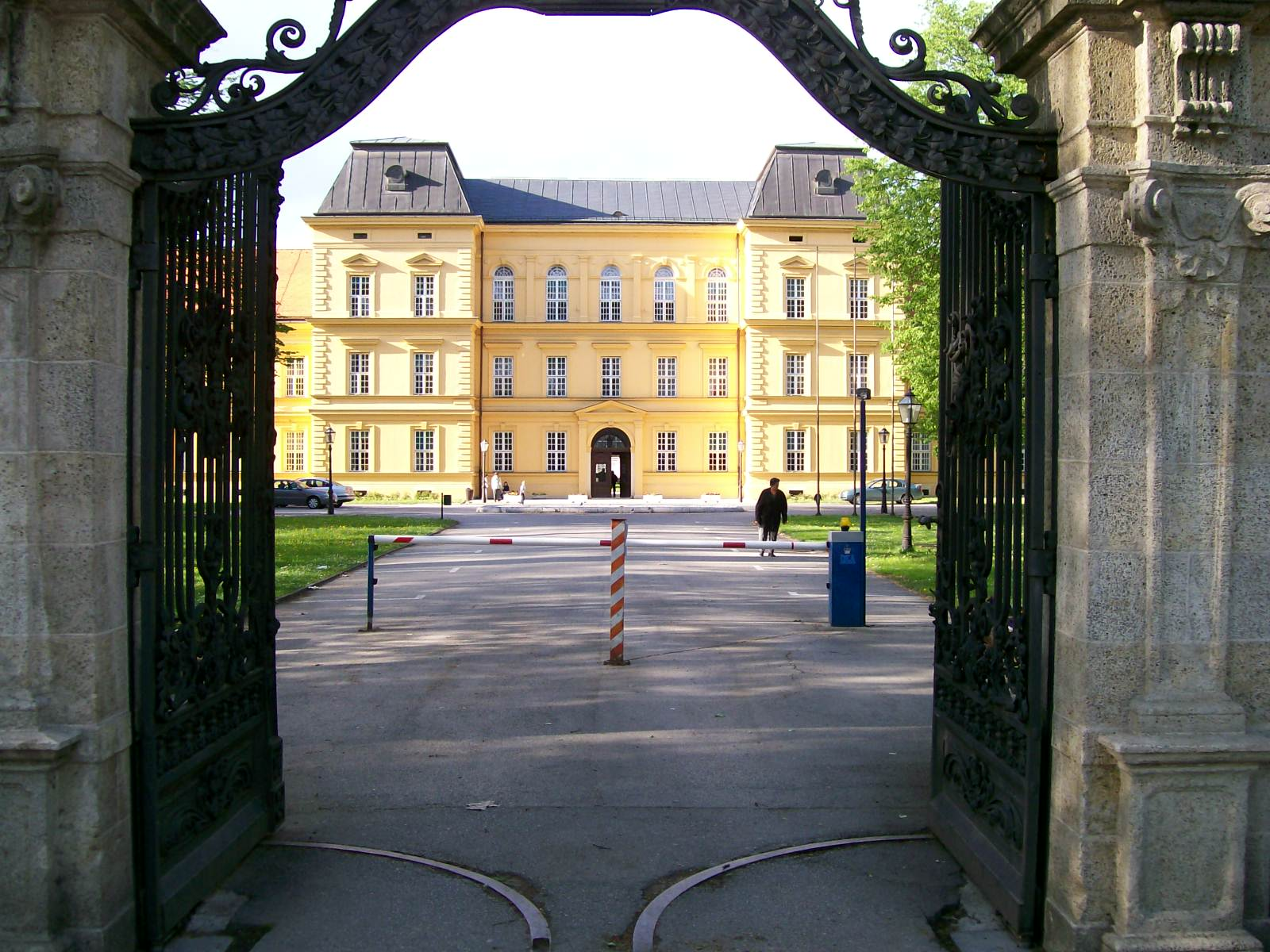
Psychiatric hospital in Vrapče, where Kovačić died

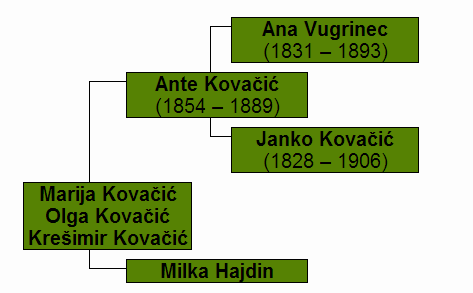
Family tree of Ante Kovačić

Kovačić died of pneumonia in psychiatric hospital in Vrapče, Zagreb. He was insane at the moment of his death.

He was buried at Mirogoj Cemetery.

== Family ==
Kovačić's wife was called Milka Hajdin, with whom he had six children. Ante and Milka were married in Mala Gorica. Their daughters Olga and Marija were teachers, while their son Krešimir was a journalist, who died in 1960.

== Works ==
- Zagorski čudak
- Fiškal
- Smrt babe Čengićkinje
- Baruničina ljubav
- Među žabari
- U registraturi
