= Kľušov =

- Municipality
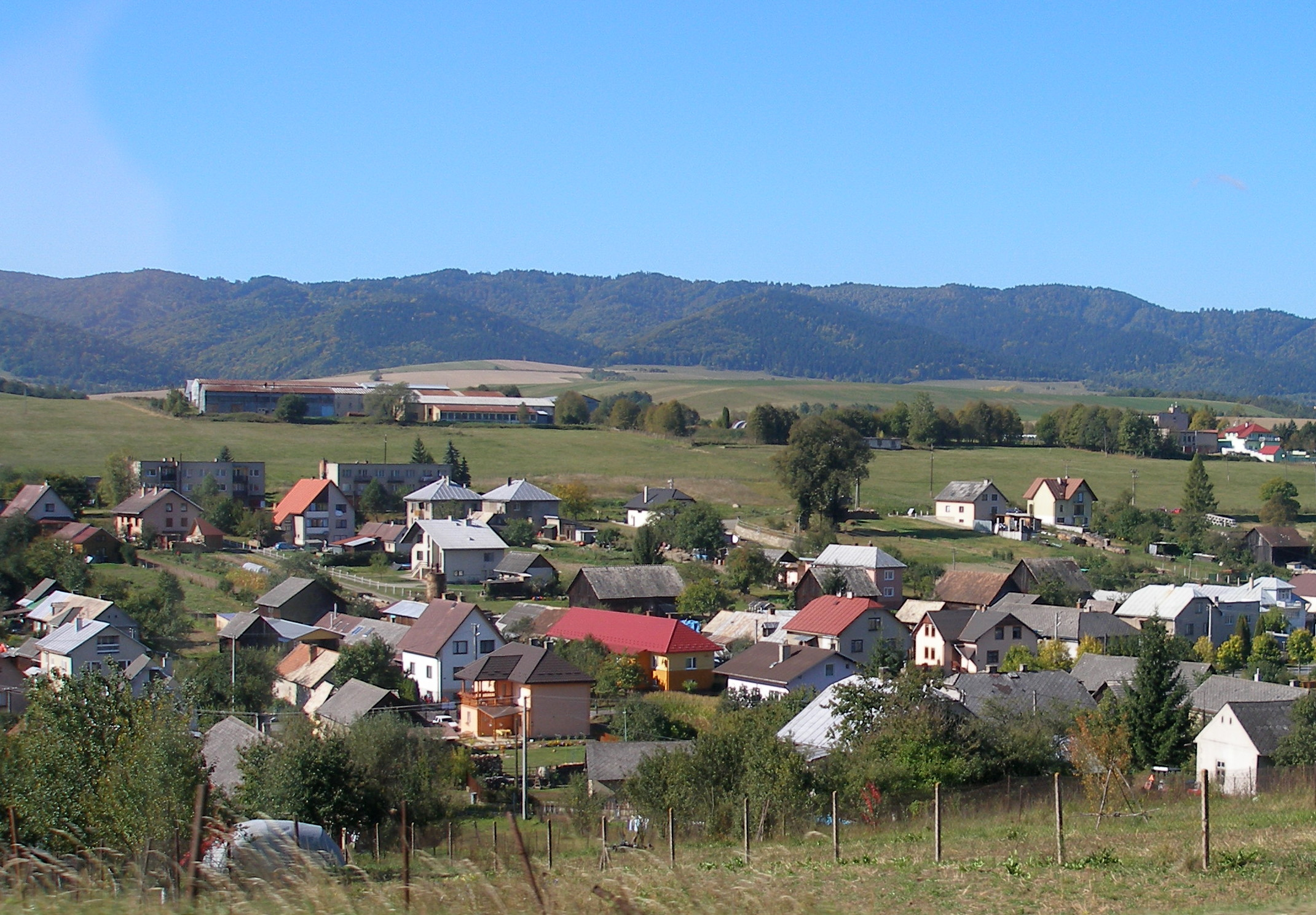

- Flag

- Location of Kľušov in the Prešov Region Location of Kľušov in Slovakia
- Coordinates: 49.25°N 21.27°E
- Country: Slovakia
- Region: Prešov Region
- District: Bardejov District
- First mentioned: 1330

Area
  - Total: 15.35 km^{2} (5.93 sq mi)
- Elevation: 317 m (1,040 ft)

Population (2025)
  - Total: 1,071
- Time zone: UTC+1 (CET)
  - Summer (DST): UTC+2 (CEST)
- Postal code: 862 2
- Area code: +421 54
- Vehicle registration plate (until 2022): BJ
- Website: www.obecklusov.sk

Kľušov (Hungarian: Kolossó) is a village and small municipality in Bardejov District in the Prešov Region of north-east Slovakia.

== History ==
The village was first mentioned in historical records in 1330. Prior to the Treaty of Trianon, it was part of Sáros county.

== Geography ==
The municipality lies at an altitude of 317 metres (1,040 ft) and covers an area of 15.35 km^{2} (5.93 sq mi) (2025).

== Population ==
Population statistic (10 years)
Year	1995	2005	2015	2025
Count	989	1038	1086	1071
Difference		+4.95%	+4.62%	−1.38%

Population statistic
Year	2024	2025
Count	1089	1071
Difference		−1.65%

It has a population of 1071 people (31 December 2025).

=== Ethnicity ===
Census 2021 (1+ %)
Ethnicity	Number	Fraction
Slovak	1029	95.18%
Not found out	40	3.7%
Rusyn	23	2.12%
Total	1081	

In year 2021 was 1081 people by ethnicity 1029 as Slovak, 40 as Not found out, 23 as Rusyn, 7 as Ukrainian, 4 as Other, 3 as Czech and 3 as Russian.

Note on population: The difference values of population numbers in the table "Population statistic" and in the sections "Ethnicity" & "Religion" is caused by the use of various statistical methods.

=== Religion ===
Census 2021 (1+ %)
Religion	Number	Fraction
Roman Catholic Church	939	86.86%
Greek Catholic Church	40	3.7%
Not found out	36	3.33%
Eastern Orthodox Church	27	2.5%
Evangelical Church	18	1.67%
None	13	1.2%
Total	1081	

In year 2021 was 1081 people by religion 939 from Roman Catholic Church, 40 from Greek Catholic Church, 36 from Not found out, 27 from Eastern Orthodox Church, 18 from Evangelical Church, 13 from None, 4 from Seventh-day Adventist Church, 2 from United Methodist Church, 1 from Other and 1 from Ad hoc movements.

== Genealogical resources ==
The records for genealogical research are available at the state archive "Statny Archiv in Presov, Slovakia." The Roman Catholic church for Kľušov was Kobyly.

- Roman Catholic church records (births/marriages/deaths): 1755-1895 (parish B)
- Greek Catholic church records (births/marriages/deaths): 1854-1901 (parish B)

== See also ==
- List of municipalities and towns in Slovakia
