= Krivé =

- Municipality
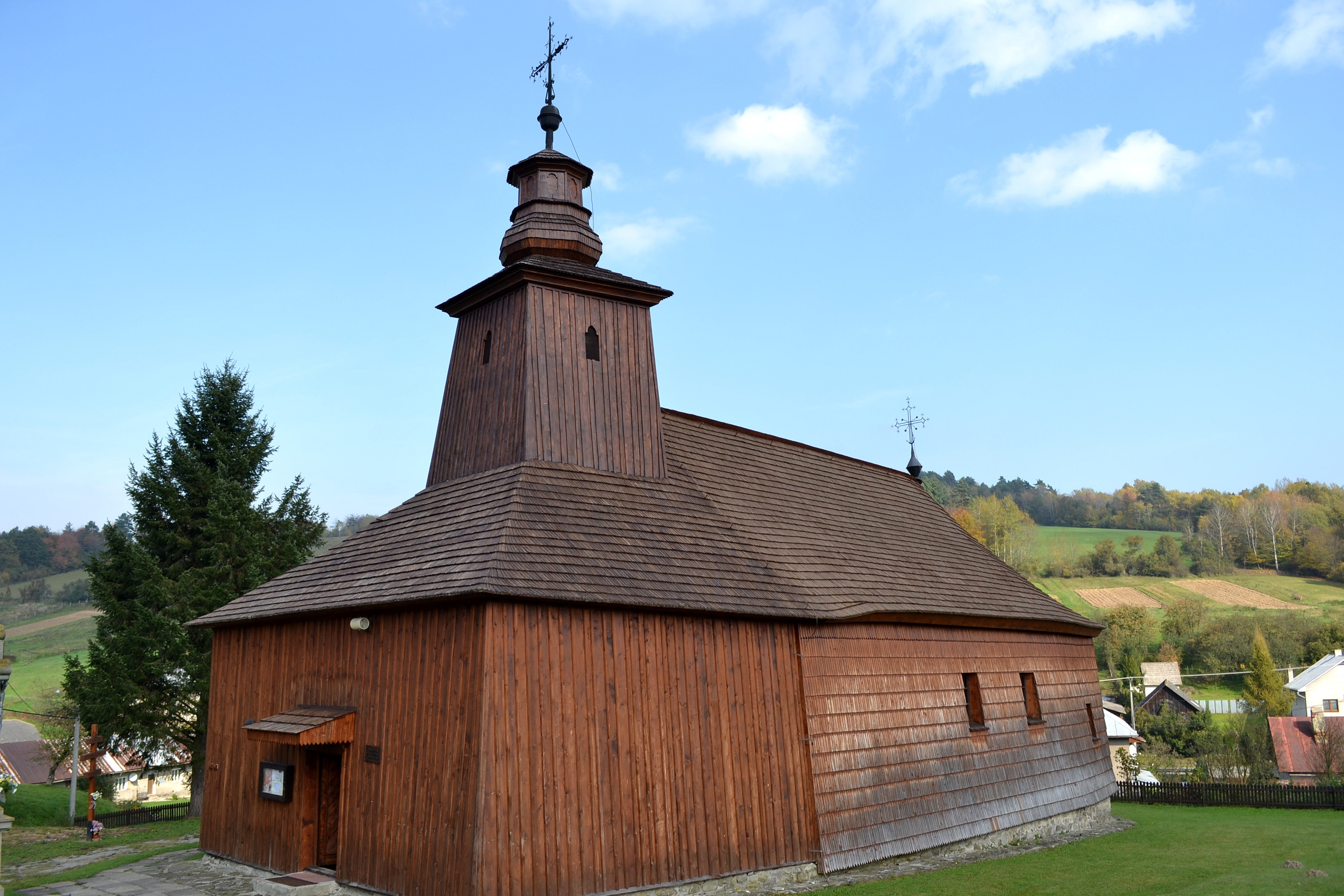
- Wooden church at Krivé

- Flag

- Location of Krivé in the Prešov Region Location of Krivé in Slovakia
- Coordinates: 49.29°N 21.16°E
- Country: Slovakia
- Region: Prešov Region
- District: Bardejov District
- First mentioned: 1454

Area
  - Total: 5.27 km^{2} (2.03 sq mi)
- Elevation: 417 m (1,368 ft)

Population (2025)
  - Total: 201
- Time zone: UTC+1 (CET)
  - Summer (DST): UTC+2 (CEST)
- Postal code: 860 4
- Area code: +421 54
- Vehicle registration plate (until 2022): BJ
- Website: krive.estranky.sk

Krivé is a village and municipality in Bardejov District in the Prešov Region of north-east Slovakia.

== History ==
In historical records the village was first mentioned in 1406, when the village was named Spyskvagasa. From the 15th century onwards it was settled by Ruthenians.

The wooden Greek Orthodox church of St. Luke the Evangelist is of relatively late construction (about 1826). It originally had three cupolas, but two were removed in a restoration of 1969. The church contains a baroque 18th century iconostasis.

== Geography ==
The municipality lies at an altitude of 417 metres (1,368 ft) and covers an area of 5.27 km^{2} (2.03 sq mi) (2025).

== Population ==
Population statistic (10 years)
Year	1995	2005	2015	2025
Count	235	205	219	201
Difference		−12.76%	+6.82%	−8.21%

Population statistic
Year	2024	2025
Count	206	201
Difference		−2.42%

It has a population of 201 people (31 December 2025).

=== Ethnic composition ===
Census 2021 (1+ %)
Ethnicity	Number	Fraction
Slovak	207	97.64%
Rusyn	75	35.37%
Total	212	

In year 2021 was 212 people by ethnicity 207 as Slovak, 75 as Rusyn, 2 as Not found out, 1 as Ukrainian and 1 as Hungarian.

Note on population: The difference values of population numbers in the table "Population statistic" and in the sections "Ethnicity" & "Religion" is caused by the use of various statistical methods.

=== Religion ===
Census 2021 (1+ %)
Religion	Number	Fraction
Greek Catholic Church	162	76.42%
Roman Catholic Church	32	15.09%
Evangelical Church	11	5.19%
Eastern Orthodox Church	3	1.42%
None	3	1.42%
Total	212	

In year 2021 was 212 people by religion 162 from Greek Catholic Church, 32 from Roman Catholic Church, 11 from Evangelical Church, 3 from Eastern Orthodox Church, 3 from None and 1 from Not found out.
