= Kružlov =

- Municipality
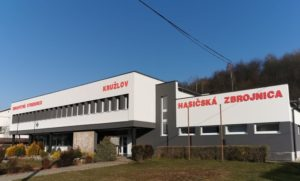

- Flag

- Location of Kružlov in the Prešov Region Location of Kružlov in Slovakia
- Coordinates: 49.30°N 21.13°E
- Country: Slovakia
- Region: Prešov Region
- District: Bardejov District
- First mentioned: 1460

Area
  - Total: 10.13 km^{2} (3.91 sq mi)
- Elevation: 350 m (1,150 ft)

Population (2025)
  - Total: 975
- Time zone: UTC+1 (CET)
  - Summer (DST): UTC+2 (CEST)
- Postal code: 860 4
- Area code: +421 54
- Vehicle registration plate (until 2022): BJ
- Website: www.kruzlov.sk

Kružlov is a village and municipality in Bardejov District in the Prešov Region of north-east Slovakia. In historical records, the village was first mentioned in 1460. The municipality lies at an altitude of 360 metres and covers an area of 10.143 km². It has a population of about 1000 people.

== Geography ==
The municipality lies at an altitude of 350 metres (1,150 ft) and covers an area of 10.13 km^{2} (3.91 sq mi) (2025).

== Population ==
Population statistic (10 years)
Year	1995	2005	2015	2025
Count	1006	1009	1040	975
Difference		+0.29%	+3.07%	−6.25%

Population statistic
Year	2024	2025
Count	981	975
Difference		−0.61%

It has a population of 975 people (31 December 2025).

=== Ethnicity ===
Census 2021 (1+ %)
Ethnicity	Number	Fraction
Slovak	919	92.17%
Rusyn	226	22.66%
Not found out	25	2.5%
Total	997	

In year 2021 was 997 people by ethnicity 919 as Slovak, 226 as Rusyn, 25 as Not found out, 5 as Czech, 5 as Ukrainian, 5 as Romani, 1 as Italian, 1 as Russian and 1 as Polish.

Note on population: The difference values of population numbers in the table "Population statistic" and in the sections "Ethnicity" & "Religion" is caused by the use of various statistical methods.

=== Religion ===
Census 2021 (1+ %)
Religion	Number	Fraction
Greek Catholic Church	612	61.38%
Roman Catholic Church	277	27.78%
None	40	4.01%
Evangelical Church	24	2.41%
Eastern Orthodox Church	20	2.01%
Not found out	20	2.01%
Total	997	

In year 2021 was 997 people by religion 612 from Greek Catholic Church, 277 from Roman Catholic Church, 40 from None, 24 from Evangelical Church, 20 from Eastern Orthodox Church, 20 from Not found out, 3 from Calvinist Church and 1 from Christian Congregations in Slovakia.
