= Kraj Donji =

Coordinates: 45°54′54″N 15°42′18″E

- Interactive map of Kraj Donji

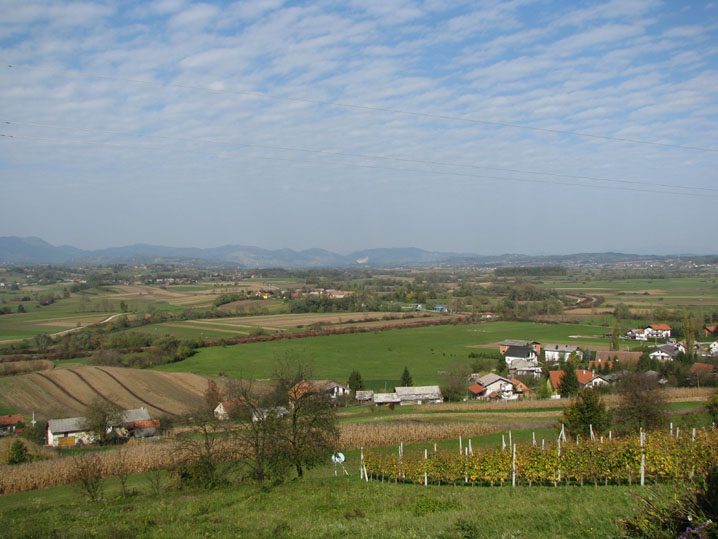
Kraj Donji, Marija Gorica Municipality, Zagreb County

Kraj Donji is a village near Marija Gorica, Croatia. In the 2011 census, it had 493 inhabitants.
