= Šiba =

- Municipality
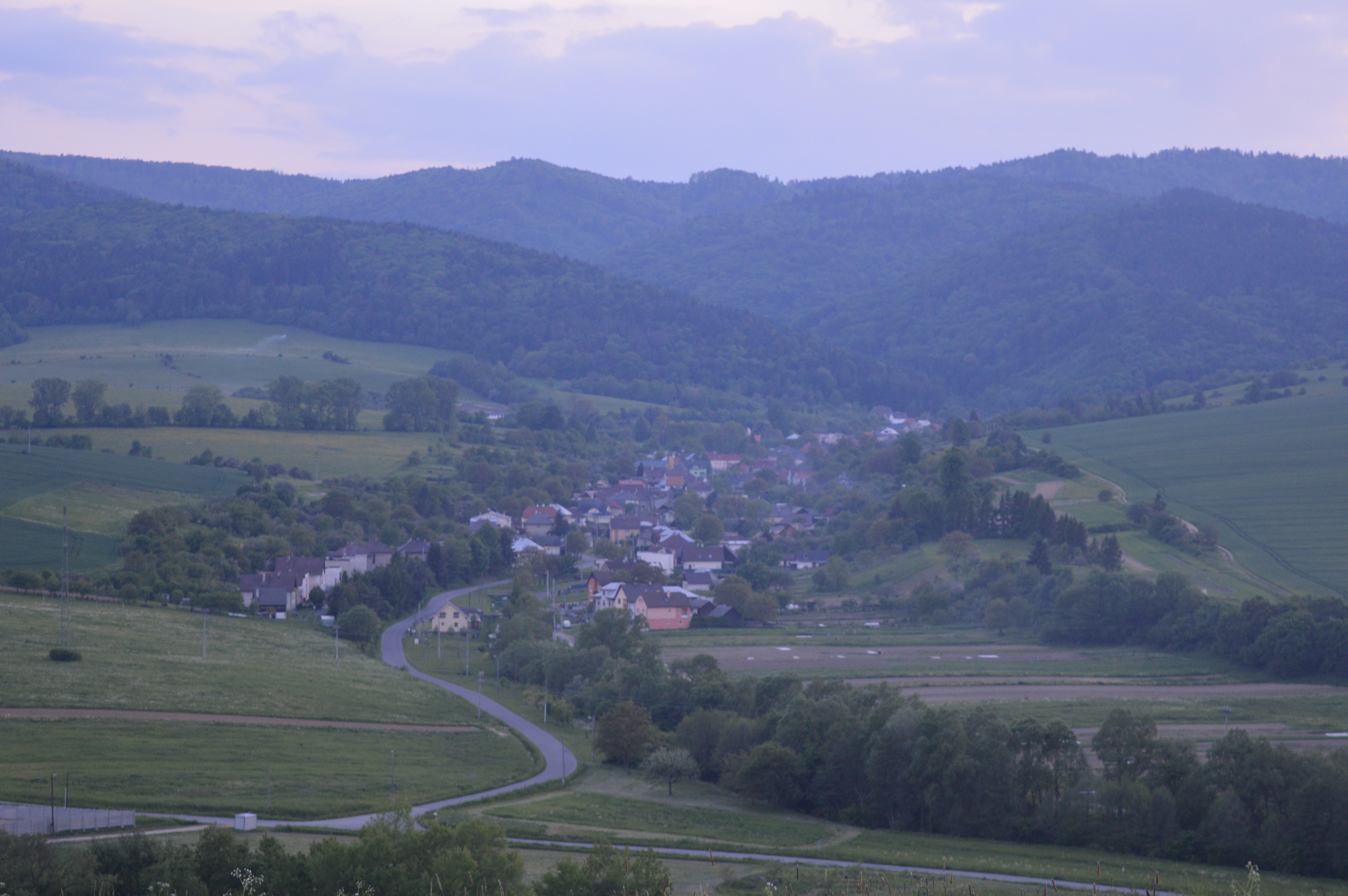

- Flag

- Location of Šiba in the Prešov Region Location of Šiba in Slovakia
- Coordinates: 49.23°N 21.23°E
- Country: Slovakia
- Region: Prešov Region
- District: Bardejov District
- First mentioned: 1427

Area
  - Total: 13.82 km^{2} (5.34 sq mi)
- Elevation: 430 m (1,410 ft)

Population (2025)
  - Total: 629
- Time zone: UTC+1 (CET)
  - Summer (DST): UTC+2 (CEST)
- Postal code: 862 2
- Area code: +421 54
- Vehicle registration plate (until 2022): BJ

Šiba is a village and municipality in Bardejov District in the Prešov Region of north-east Slovakia.

== History ==
In historical records the village was first mentioned in 1427.

== Geography ==
The municipality lies at an altitude of 430 metres (1,410 ft) and covers an area of 13.82 km^{2} (5.34 sq mi) (2025).

== Population ==
Population statistic (10 years)
Year	1995	2005	2015	2025
Count	541	566	610	629
Difference		+4.62%	+7.77%	+3.11%

Population statistic
Year	2024	2025
Count	636	629
Difference		−1.10%

It has a population of 629 people (31 December 2025).

=== Ethnicity ===
Census 2021 (1+ %)
Ethnicity	Number	Fraction
Slovak	625	98.73%
Rusyn	8	1.26%
Total	633	

In year 2021 was 633 people by ethnicity 625 as Slovak, 8 as Rusyn, 5 as Not found out, 4 as Polish, 1 as German and 1 as Other.

Note on population: The difference values of population numbers in the table "Population statistic" and in the sections "Ethnicity" & "Religion" is caused by the use of various statistical methods.

=== Religion ===
Census 2021 (1+ %)
Religion	Number	Fraction
Roman Catholic Church	593	93.68%
Greek Catholic Church	18	2.84%
None	10	1.58%
Total	633	

In year 2021 was 633 people by religion 593 from Roman Catholic Church, 18 from Greek Catholic Church, 10 from None, 5 from Not found out, 5 from Evangelical Church, 1 from Eastern Orthodox Church and 1 from Apostolic Church.
