= Križ, Trebnje =

Križ
- Location in Slovenia
- Coordinates: 45°57′7.01″N 15°0′28.3″E
- Country: Slovenia
- Traditional region: Lower Carniola
- Statistical region: Southeast Slovenia
- Municipality: Trebnje

Area
  - Total: 0.25 km^{2} (0.097 sq mi)
- Elevation: 370.7 m (1,216 ft)

Population (2002)
  - Total: 18

Križ (pronounced [ˈkɾiːʃ]) is a small village in the Municipality of Trebnje in eastern Slovenia. It lies in the hills north of Trebnje, just off the regional road leading from Račje Selo to Čatež. The area is part of the historical region of Lower Carniola and is now included in the Southeast Slovenia Statistical Region.
