= Kříž =

Kříž (feminine Křížová) is a Czech surname, meaning "cross". It may refer to:

- Denisa Křížová, Czech ice hockey player
- František Kříž, Czech fencer
- Jaroslav Kříž, Czech judoka
- Jiřina Křížová, Czech field hockey player
- Klára Křížová, Czech skier
- Ladislav Kříž, Czech athlete
- Martin Kříž, Czech basketball player
- Miloslav Kříž, Czech basketball player
- Tomáš Kříž, Czech footballer
