= Križ Hrastovački =

- Village
- Location within Croatia
- Coordinates: 45°25′19″N 16°14′40″E
- Country: Croatia
- County: Sisak-Moslavina
- Municipality: Petrinja

Area
  - Total: 2.9 km^{2} (1.1 sq mi)

Population (2021)
  - Total: 139
  - Density: 48/km^{2} (120/sq mi)
- Time zone: UTC+1 (CET)
  - Summer (DST): UTC+2 (CEST)

Križ Hrastovački is a village in Petrinja municipality in Sisak-Moslavina County, Croatia.
