= Jürgen Kriz =

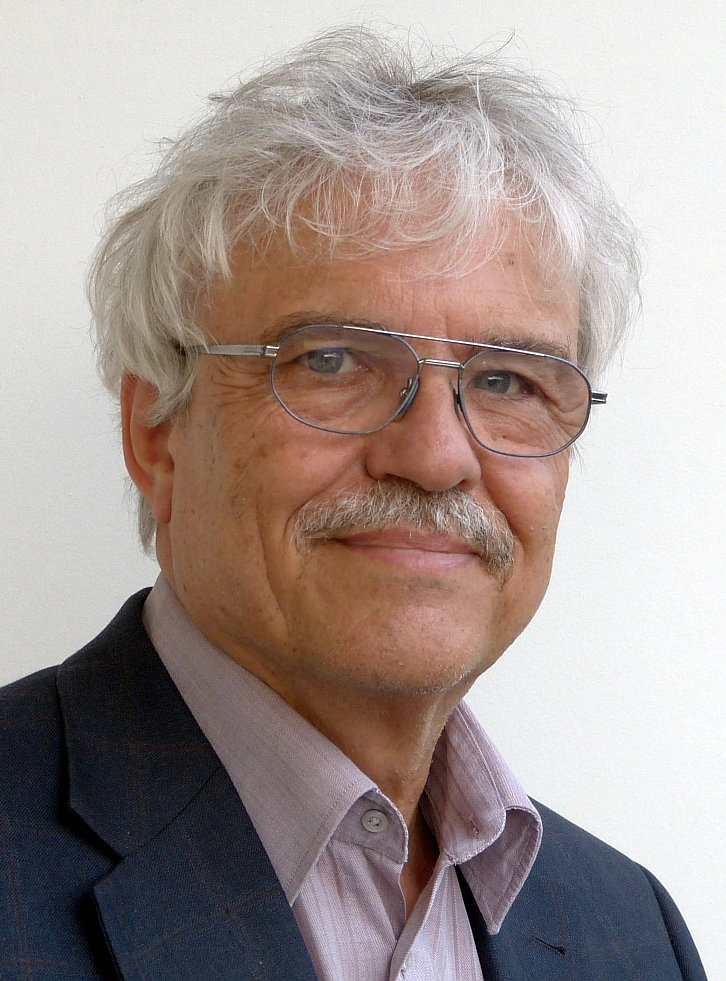
Jürgen Kriz

Jürgen Kriz (born 5 December 1944 in Ehrhorn/Soltau, Germany) is a German psychologist, psychotherapist and emeritus professor for psychotherapy and clinical psychology at the Osnabrück University, Germany. He is a prominent thinker in systems theory and the founder of the person-centered systems theory – a multi-level concept for the understanding of processes in psychotherapy, counseling, coaching and clinical psychology.

== Biography ==
Kriz studied psychology, philosophy and social pedagogy as well as astronomy and astrophysics at the universities of Hamburg, Germany, and Vienna, Austria, where he obtained his doctorate in 1969 with a dissertation about 'Subjective Probability and Decision Theory'. After working as scholar and research assistant at the Institute of Advanced Studies in Vienna, Austria, he was an associate professor at the University of Hamburg, Germany. In 1972, he became professor for statistics at the Department of Sociology of the Bielefeld University, Germany. From 1974 to 1999, Kriz was full professor for research methods, statistics and philosophy of science at the Faculty of Sociology of the Osnabrück University, Germany. Beginning 1980, he held the (temporarily additional) position of a full professor for psychotherapy and clinical psychology at the Department of Psychology of the Osnabrück University. Since 2010, Kriz is professor emeritus.

Kriz held numerous visiting professorships at universities in Vienna, Zurich, Riga, Moscow, Berlin and North Carolina, including the Paul Lazarsfeld Visiting Professorship of the University of Vienna. From 1994 to 1996, he was head of the international expert committee Wissen und Handeln (knowledge and action) of the Wiener Internationale Zukunftskonferenz WIZK (Vienna international future conference). Since 2000, Kriz is a member of the scientific advisory board of the Gesellschaft für Personzentrierte Psychotherapie und Beratung GwG (Society for person-centered psychotherapy and counseling). From 2004 to 2008, he was a member of the Wissenschaftlicher Beirat Psychotherapie WBP (scientific advisory board psychotherapy).

Kriz is an advisory board member of various psychotherapeutic journals. From 1994 to 2017, he was an editor of the international multidisciplinary journal 'Gestalt Theory'. He is also the editor of a textbook series titled Basiswissen Psychologie (basic psychological knowledge) comprising some 30 volumes so far (2020).

== Works and philosophy ==
Kriz has written more than 300 scientific publications including over 20 monographies. His work focuses on statistics and research methodology with particular emphasis on criticism of science as well as the development of a comprehensive approach called person-centered systems theory.

=== Critique of research practice and science ===
Having published several textbooks on statistics, data processing, research methods, and philosophy of science, Kriz focused on the limits of the meaningfulness and application of the corresponding formal models in research and working practice. In comprehensive works such as Methodenkritik empirischer Sozialforschung (critique of social research methods, 1981) and Facts and Artefacts in Social Science (1988), he argued that invalid or even nonsensical research findings are not so much the result of incorrect calculations or insufficient execution of the formal steps. Rather, they are due to an insufficient consideration of the model assumptions and boundary conditions. In many contributions, Kriz specifically addressed the issues of an inadequate application of the experimental paradigm in psychotherapy research and an inadequate interpretation of the randomized controlled trial (RCT research). Kriz argues that psychotherapy research usually neither does justice to the fact of non-linear courses in development and change processes nor does it take the human being as subject into account. The conditions for research would not only be determined by manualized effects or interventions, but also to a large extent by the patients' subjective attributions of meaning as well as their interpretations. This, however, makes the so-called "independent variables" of an experimental design dependent on interpretations. The basic concept of an experiment and the RCT logic thus becomes inadequate.

In addition to this fundamental misalignment of RCT research in psychotherapy, Kriz has criticized numerous other problems due to questionable – mostly undiscussed – assumptions.

=== Person-centered systems theory ===
Courses of human development and changes through therapy, counseling or coaching are characterized by non-linear processes in which many aspects interact. Kriz tried to take this into account when he developed the person-centered systems theory. It deals with non-linear interactions on (at least) four levels: In addition to the interaction of (1) psychological and (2) interpersonal processes – which are reflected in most approaches to psychotherapy or counseling – the impact of (3) somatic (and here especially evolutionary) as well as (4) cultural processes are considered. Furthermore, the complementarity between "objective" perspectives of scientists, counselors, etc. on one hand and the perspectives of clients on the other plays an important role in Kriz' approach. Kriz points out that, for example, the "objective" findings of diagnostics often have little to do with the sensitivities of the subjects. Many concepts such as "stress" or "resources" are often described on the basis of "objective" factors although other aspects are much more relevant to the subject's experience and actions.

Subjekt und Lebenswelt (subject and lifeworld, 2017), in which Kriz summarizes three decades of work on person-centered systems theory, provides an essential analysis of the interaction between the four process levels and the complementarity of "objective" and subjective perspectives. Kriz demonstrates that the distinction between "objective" description – from the 3rd person perspective – and subjective experience – from the 1st person perspective – is a purely academic-analytical concept that contributes little to the understanding of human reality. On the contrary, both perspectives are inseparably intertwined. For in order to be able to understand the very own "inner" impulses (of the organism), one must apply the cultural tools (particularly the language) of one's own social community to oneself. One must, for example, understand and thus symbolize the immediate physical sensation of physiological processes as "longing" or "sadness" or "despair". This is not just a matter of terminology or semantics and syntax of language. Rather, language also automatically conveys the metaphors, principles of explanation and understanding, narratives, concepts of action, etc. of a culture.

Formally, person-centered systems theory is based on the self-organization paradigm within the framework of the theory of nonlinear dynamical systems – synergetics in particular. After more formal works such as Chaos und Struktur (chaos and structure, 1992) or Systemtheorie für Psychotherapeuten, Psychologen und Mediziner (systems theory for psychotherapists, psychologists and physicians, 1999), Kriz has in recent years mostly refrained from explicit formal derivations of the fundamentals in order to address a larger circle of readers.

== Awards and honors ==
- 2002: Transfer Award of the Osnabrück University.
- 2004: Grand Award of the Viktor Frankl Fund of the City of Vienna for Outstanding Achievements in the Field of Meaning-oriented Humanistic Psychotherapy (Viktor Frankl Award).
- 2004: Honorary membership of the Gesellschaft für Logotherapie und Existenzanalyse (Society for logotherapy and existential analysis) GLE International.
- 2009: Honorary member of the Systemische Gesellschaft (Systemic society).
- 2014: AGHPT Award of the Arbeitsgemeinschaft Humanistische Psychotherapie (German Federation of Humanistic Psychotherapy).
- 2015: Honorary membership of the International Society for Gestalt Theory and its Applications.
- 2016: Honorary Award of the GwG Gesellschaft für Personzentrierte Psychotherapie und Beratung e.V. ( Society for Person-centered Psychotherapy and Counselling).
- 2019: Award of the Dr. Margrit Egnér Foundation for outstanding achievements in the field of "anthropological and humanistic psychology".
- 2020: Verdienstkreuz am Bande des Verdienstordens der Bundesrepublik Deutschland (Order of Merit of the Federal Republic of Germany).
- 2021: Honorary member of the AGHPT.

== Selected publications ==
- 2023: Humanistische Psychotherapie. Grundlagen - Richtungen - Evidenz (Humanistic Psychotherapy. Essentials - Approaches - Evidence). Stuttgart: Kohlhammer, ISBN 978-3-17-036563-6.
- 2023: Grundkonzepte der Psychotherapie (Essential concepts of psychotherapy). Weinheim: Beltz. 8th Edition, ISBN 978-3-621-28844-6.
- 2017: Subjekt und Lebenswelt. Personzentrierte Systemtheorie für Psychotherapie, Beratung und Coaching (Subject and lifeworld. Person-centered systems theory for psychotherapy, counselling and coaching). Göttingen: Vandenhoeck & Ruprecht, ISBN 978-3-525-49163-8.
- 2013: Person-Centred Approach and Systems Theory. In: Cornelius-White, M., Motschnig, R. & Lux, M. (eds.): Interdisciplinary Handbook of the Person-Centered Approach: Research and Theory. New York: Springer. 261–276.
- 2009: Cognitive and Interactive Patterning: Processes of creating meaning. In: Jaan Valsiner, Peter C. M. Molenaar, Maria C. D. P. Lyra & Nandita Chaudhary (eds): Dynamic Process Methodology in the Social and Developmental Sciences. New York: Springer, 619–650.
- 2008: Self-Actualization: Person-Centred Approach and Systems Theory. PCCS-books. Ross-on-Wye, UK ISBN 978-1-906-25403-2.
- 2008 (with Jeffrey H.D. Cornelius-White): The Formative Tendency: Person-centred Systems Theory, Interdependence and Human Potential. In: Brian Levitt (ed.): Reflections on human potential: The person-centred approach as a positive psychology. Ross-on-Wye (UK): PCCS-books, 116–130.
- 2007: Oswald Külpe and the Würzburg School from the perspective of modern systems theory. In: Skilters, Jurgis (ed.): Complex cognition and qualitative science: A legacy of Oswald Külpe. (The Baltic international yearbook of cognition, logic and communication, vol. 2) Riga: Univ. of Latvia Press, 33–56.
- 2007: Actualizing Tendency: The Link between PCE and Interdisciplinary Systems Theory. Person-Centered and Experiential Psychotherapies (PCEP), 6, 1, 30–44.
- 2001: Self-Organization of Cognitive and Interactional Processes. In: Matthies, M., Malchow, H. & Kriz, J. (eds): Integrative Systems Approaches to Natural and Social Dynamics. Heidelberg: Springer, 517–537.
- 1999: On Attractors – The Teleological Principle in Systems Theory, the Arts and Therapy. POIESIS. A Journal of the Arts and Communication, 24–29.
- 1999: Systemtheorie für Psychotherapeuten, Psychologen und Mediziner (Systems theory for psychotherapists, psychologists and physicians). Wien/Stuttgart: UTB/ Facultas, 3rd ed., ISBN 3-8252-2084-2.
- 1993: Pattern Formation in Complex Cognitive Processes. In: Haken, H. & Mikhailov, A. (eds): Interdisciplinary Approaches to Nonlinear Complex Systems. Berlin/Heidelberg: Springer, 161–175.
- 1992: Chaos und Struktur. Systemtheorie Bd 1 (Chaos and structure. Systems theory vol. 1). München, Berlin: Quintessenz. ISBN 3-928036-34-3.
- 1988: Facts and Artefacts in Social Science. An epistemological and methodological analysis of social science research techniques. Hamburg, New York: McGraw-Hill, ISBN 3-89028-096-X.
