= Lukov (Bardejov District) =

Village in Prešov, Slovakia

- Village
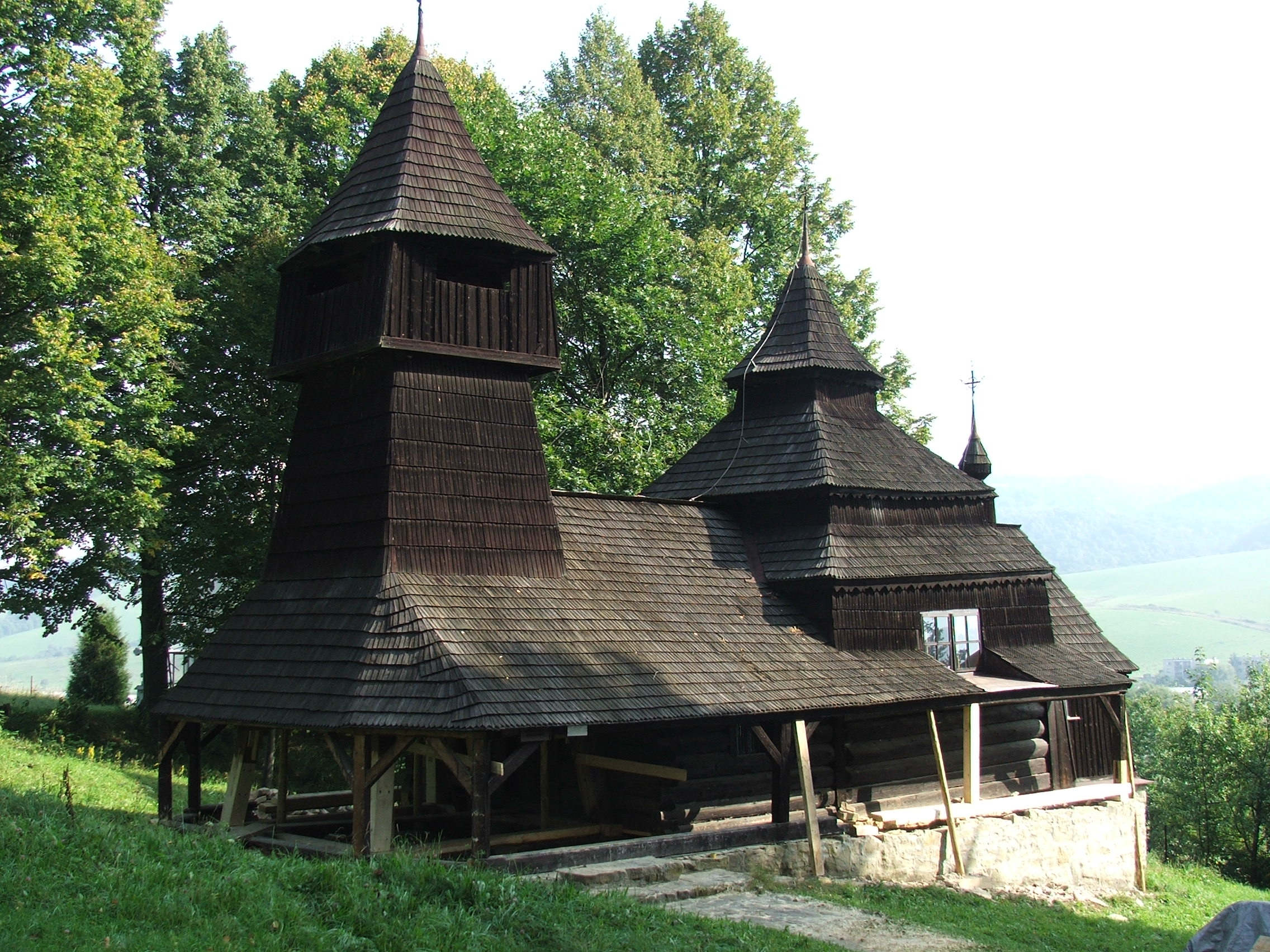
- Wooden Greek-Catholic church of Saints Cosmo and Damian (Chrám sv. Kozmu a Damiána)

- Location of Lukov in the Prešov Region Location of Lukov in Slovakia
- Coordinates: 49°18′N 21°05′E
- Country: Slovakia
- Region: Prešov
- District: Bardejov
- First mentioned: 1322

Area
  - Total: 28.57 km^{2} (11.03 sq mi)
- Elevation: 421 m (1,381 ft)

Population (2025)
  - Total: 669
  - Density: 3.37/km^{2} (8.74/sq mi)
- Time zone: UTC+1 (CET)
  - Summer (DST): UTC+2 (CEST)
- Postal code: 086 05
- Area code: +421 54
- Vehicle registration plate (until 2022): BJ
- Website: obeclukov.sk

Lukov (German: Dornau) is a village and municipality in Bardejov District in the Prešov Region of north-east Slovakia.

== History ==
In historical records the village was first mentioned in 1264 The timber Church of Saints Cosmo and Damian was built in 1708.

== Geography ==
The municipality lies at an altitude of 421 metres (1,381 ft) and covers an area of 28.57 km^{2} (11.03 sq mi) (2025).

== Population ==
Population statistic (10 years)
Year	1995	2005	2015	2025
Count	463	584	621	669
Difference		+26.13%	+6.33%	+7.72%

Population statistic
Year	2024	2025
Count	663	669
Difference		+0.90%

It has a population of 669 people (31 December 2025).

=== Ethnicity ===
Census 2021 (1+ %)
Ethnicity	Number	Fraction
Slovak	610	93.55%
Rusyn	118	18.09%
Romani	48	7.36%
Not found out	12	1.84%
Total	652	

In year 2021 was 652 people by ethnicity 610 as Slovak, 118 as Rusyn, 48 as Romani, 12 as Not found out, 3 as Ukrainian and 3 as Other.

Note on population: The difference values of population numbers in the table "Population statistic" and in the sections "Ethnicity" & "Religion" is caused by the use of various statistical methods.

=== Religion ===
Census 2021 (1+ %)
Religion	Number	Fraction
Eastern Orthodox Church	316	48.47%
Greek Catholic Church	237	36.35%
Roman Catholic Church	50	7.67%
None	22	3.37%
Evangelical Church	15	2.3%
Not found out	10	1.53%
Total	652	

In year 2021 was 652 people by religion 316 from Eastern Orthodox Church, 237 from Greek Catholic Church, 50 from Roman Catholic Church, 22 from None, 15 from Evangelical Church, 10 from Not found out and 2 from Ad hoc movements.
