= Križ, Sežana =

Križ
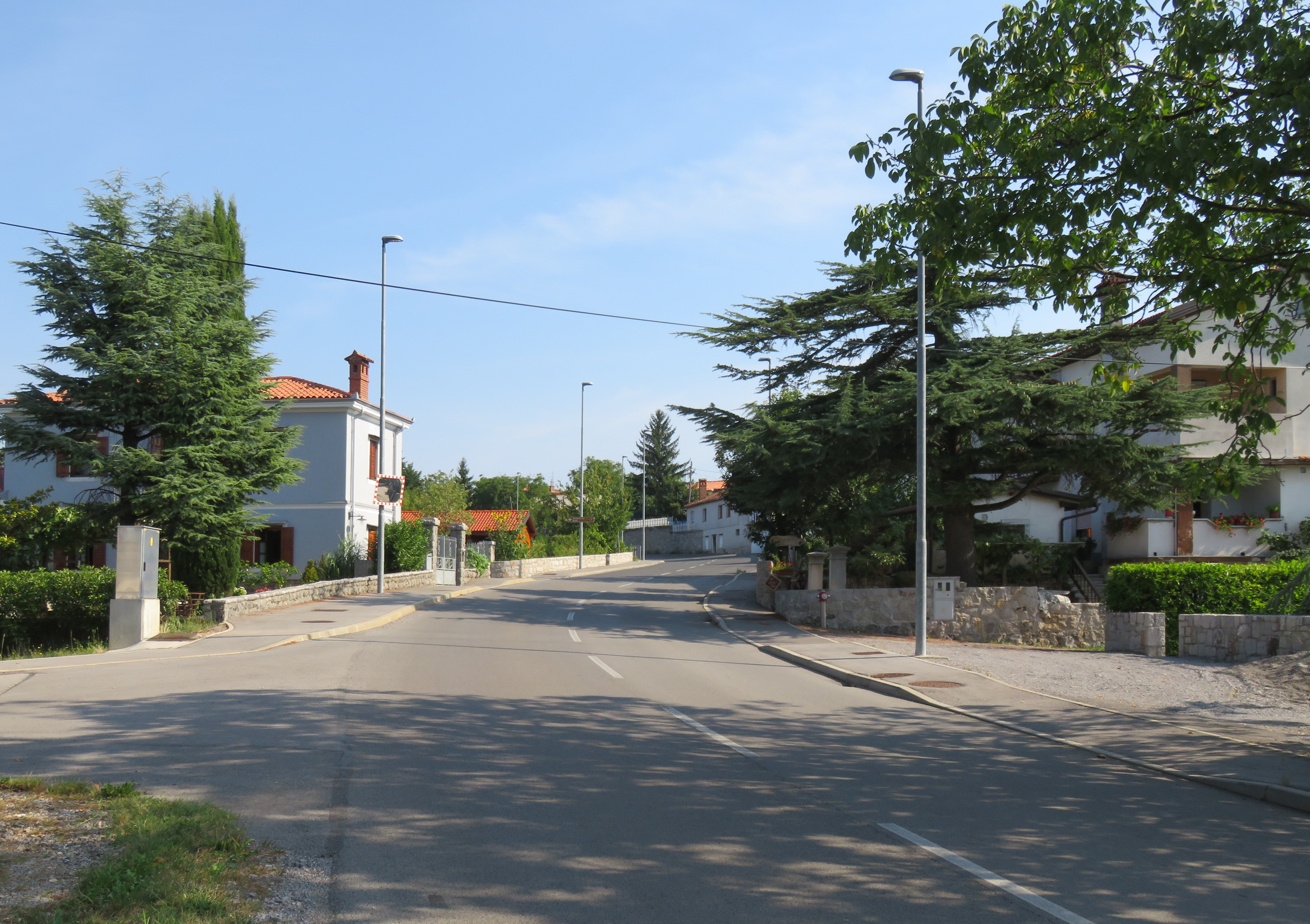

- Location in Slovenia
- Coordinates: 45°44′42.28″N 13°52′5.7″E
- Country: Slovenia
- Traditional region: Littoral
- Statistical region: Coastal–Karst
- Municipality: Sežana

Area
  - Total: 3.82 km^{2} (1.47 sq mi)
- Elevation: 338.3 m (1,110 ft)

Population (2002)
  - Total: 500

Križ (pronounced [ˈkɾiːʃ]; Italian: Croce di Tomadio) is a village in the Municipality of Sežana in the Littoral region of Slovenia, close to the border with Italy.

== Church ==
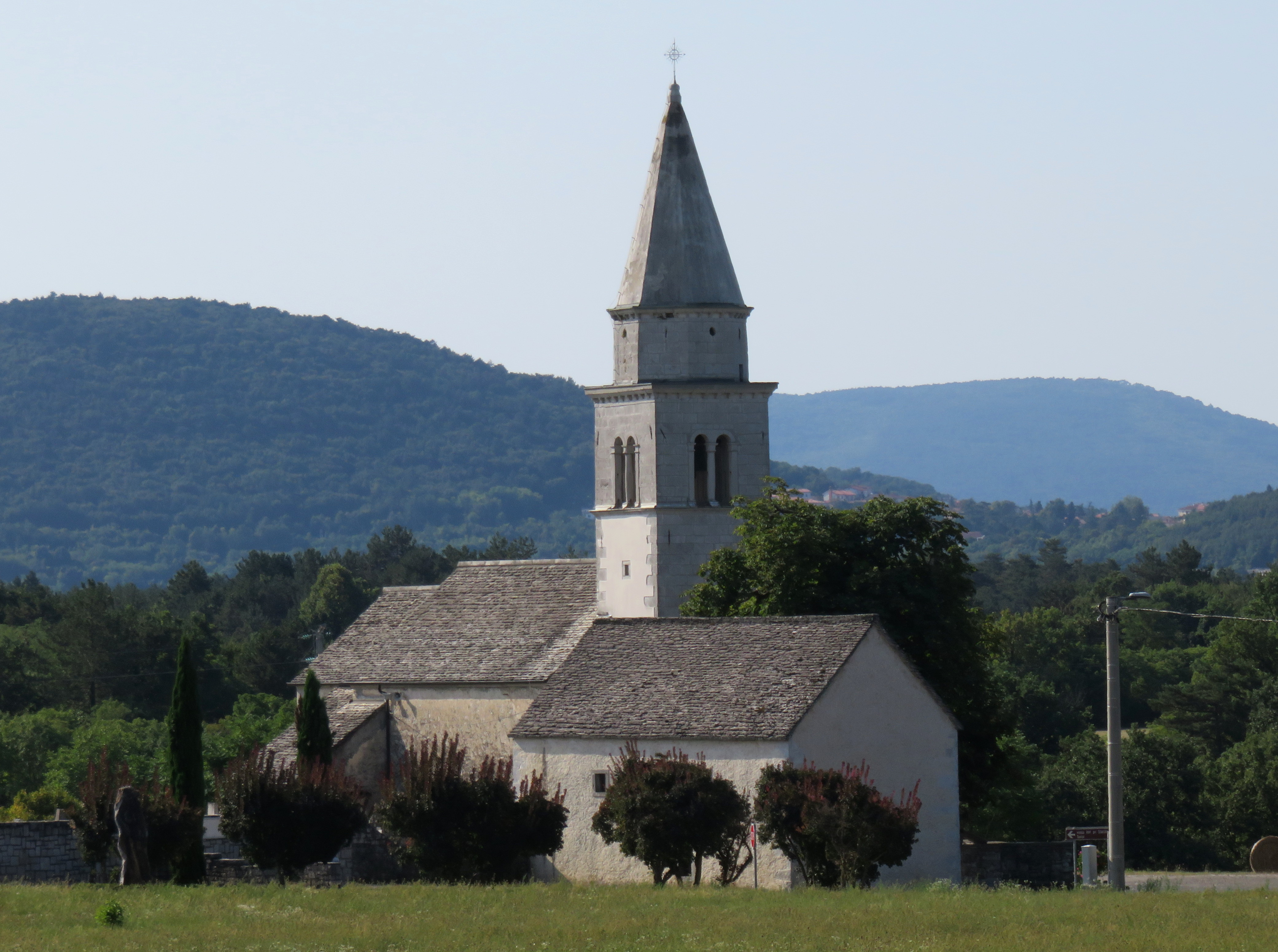
Holy Cross Church

The church in the settlement is dedicated to the Holy Cross and belongs to the Parish of Tomaj.
