= Richvald =

- Municipality
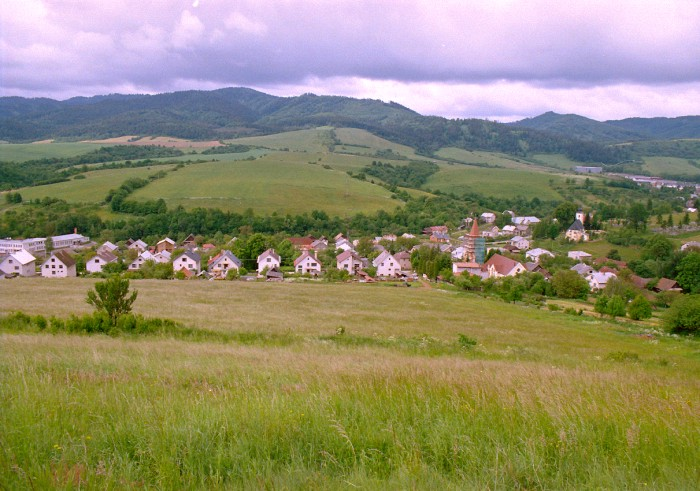

- Flag Coat of arms

- Location of Richvald in the Prešov Region Location of Richvald in Slovakia
- Coordinates: 49.28°N 21.20°E
- Country: Slovakia
- Region: Prešov Region
- District: Bardejov District
- First mentioned: 1355

Area
  - Total: 21.88 km^{2} (8.45 sq mi)
- Elevation: 373 m (1,224 ft)

Population (2025)
  - Total: 1,016
- Time zone: UTC+1 (CET)
  - Summer (DST): UTC+2 (CEST)
- Postal code: 850 1
- Area code: +421 54
- Vehicle registration plate (until 2022): BJ
- Website: www.richvald.sk

Richvald (German: Reichwald, rich forest) is a village and municipality in Bardejov District in the Prešov Region of north-east Slovakia.

== History ==
In historical records the village was first mentioned as a German settlement in 1355.

== Geography ==
The municipality lies at an altitude of 373 metres (1,224 ft) and covers an area of 21.88 km^{2} (8.45 sq mi) (2025).

The pronunciation of Richvald is not the same as the English word rich (meaning wealthy). The ch has the breathy sound of the German word ich (which is translated I in English).

During the time that Slovakia was part of Austria-Hungary, the village was listed on Hungarian maps under the name Erdovagas.

The German Luftwaffe took aerial photographs of this village and the surrounding countryside during World War II. Black and white images may be obtained from the US Department of the Interior, US Geological Survey.

== Population ==
Population statistic (10 years)
| Year | 1995 | 2005 | 2015 | 2025 |
|---|---|---|---|---|
| Count | 1032 | 977 | 1007 | 1016 |
| Difference | | −5.32% | +3.07% | +0.89% |

Population statistic
| Year | 2024 | 2025 |
|---|---|---|
| Count | 1023 | 1016 |
| Difference | | −0.68% |

It has a population of 1016 people (31 December 2025).

=== Ethnicity ===
Census 2021 (1+ %)
| Ethnicity | Number | Fraction |
|---|---|---|
| Slovak | 975 | 97.89% |
| Romani | 16 | 1.6% |
| Not found out | 14 | 1.4% |
| Total | 996 | |

In year 2021 was 996 people by ethnicity 975 as Slovak, 16 as Romani, 14 as Not found out, 8 as Czech, 4 as German, 3 as Rusyn, 1 as Ukrainian, 1 as Other and 1 as English.

Note on population: The difference values of population numbers in the table "Population statistic" and in the sections "Ethnicity" & "Religion" is caused by the use of various statistical methods.

=== Religion ===
Census 2021 (1+ %)
| Religion | Number | Fraction |
|---|---|---|
| Evangelical Church | 654 | 65.66% |
| Roman Catholic Church | 245 | 24.6% |
| None | 30 | 3.01% |
| Greek Catholic Church | 23 | 2.31% |
| Church of the Brethren | 13 | 1.31% |
| Not found out | 11 | 1.1% |
| Other and not ascertained christian church | 10 | 1% |
| Total | 996 | |

In year 2021 was 996 people by religion 654 from Evangelical Church, 245 from Roman Catholic Church, 30 from None, 23 from Greek Catholic Church, 13 from Church of the Brethren, 11 from Not found out, 10 from Other and not ascertained christian church, 4 from Eastern Orthodox Church, 2 from Paganism and natural spirituality, 2 from Ad hoc movements, 1 from Other and 1 from Buddhism.
