= Marija Gorica =

- Municipality
- Općina Marija Gorica
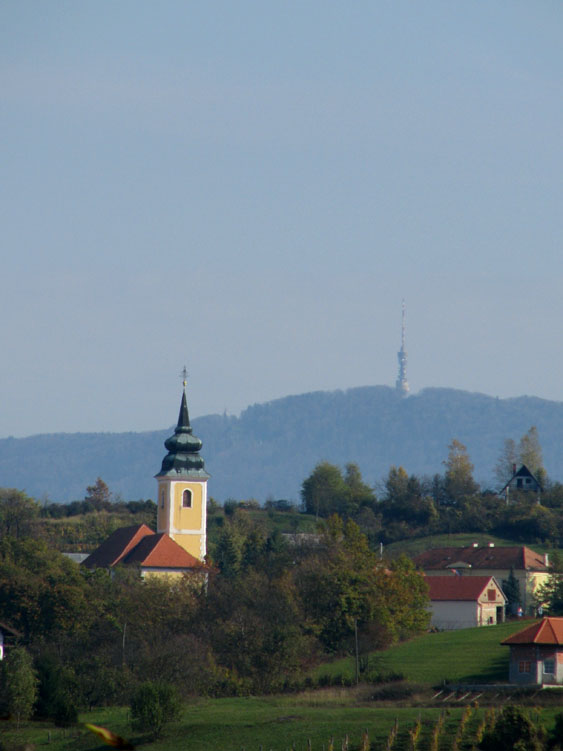

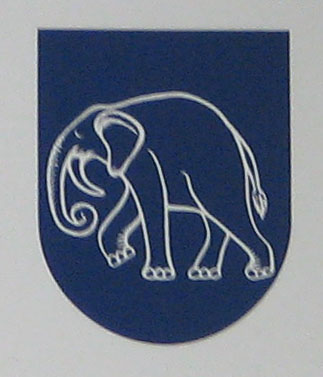
- Coat of arms
- Interactive map of Marija Gorica
- Location of Marija Gorica in Croatia
- Coordinates: 45°55′12″N 15°43′48″E
- Country: Croatia
- Region: Central Croatia
- County: Zagreb County
- Settlements: 10 settlements: Bijela Gorica; Celine Goričke; Hrastina; Kraj Donji; Kraj Gornji; Križ Brdovečki; Marija Gorica (seat); Oplanik; Trstenik; Žlebec Gorički

Government
  - Mayor: Marica Jančić (HDZ)

Area
  - Municipality: 17.1 km^{2} (6.6 sq mi)
  - Urban: 1.3 km^{2} (0.50 sq mi)

Population (2021)
  - Municipality: 2,094
  - Density: 122/km^{2} (317/sq mi)
  - Urban: 228
  - Urban density: 180/km^{2} (450/sq mi)
- Time zone: UTC+1 (CET)
  - Summer (DST): UTC+2 (CEST)
- Postal codes: 10299, 10293
- Area code: 01
- License plates: ZG
- Website: marija-gorica.hr

Marija Gorica (pronounced [mǎrija ɡǒrit͡sa]) is a municipality in western Zagreb County of Croatia on the border with Slovenia.

== History ==
The name of the settlement is derived from the patron saint of the parish church, which is dedicated to the Assumption of the Blessed Virgin Mary. Marija is a Croatian form of the name Mary, while Gorica means "hill" (and particularly wine-growing hills). The church was founded in the 16th century as a Franciscan monastery, and its first patron saint had been Saint Peter. The change of patronage happened in the second half of the 17th century, when a statue of the Virgin from the church altar became famous for its supposed healing powers.

Fossilized teeth of the extinct proboscid Deinotherium (also depicted on the municipal coat of arms) have been found in Marija Gorica.

One of the most prolific writers of Croatian Realism, Ante Kovačić was born in the neighboring village of Bila Gorica, and started his schooling in the elementary school in Marija Gorica. The school had been built in the 19th century, in the center of the village, across from the Church of Visitation of the Blessed Virgin Mary. The elementary school was later named Osnovna škola Ante Kovačića in his honor. The mayor is Marica Jančić, who was born in Žlebec Gorički.

One of the events during the last weeks of the World War II, when many armies were retreating towards Austria and Germany, happened on April 24, 1945 in the neighboring village of Hrastina, 43 people were murdered. Although the event was only recently sufficiently explored, in 1977 a monument was erected for the remembrance of these people. According to these information, 43 German Sinti Roma and other members of a traveling circus were murdered by Ustase soldiers during the Hrastina Massacre.

== Population ==
In the 2011 census, there were 2,233 inhabitants, in the following settlements:

- Bijela Gorica, population 157
- Celine Goričke, population 118
- Hrastina, population 178
- Kraj Donji, population 493
- Kraj Gornji, population 146
- Marija Gorica, population 213
- Oplaznik, population 77
- Sveti Križ, population 434
- Trstenik, population 350
- Žlebec Gorički, population 67

In the same census, the absolute majority were Croats.

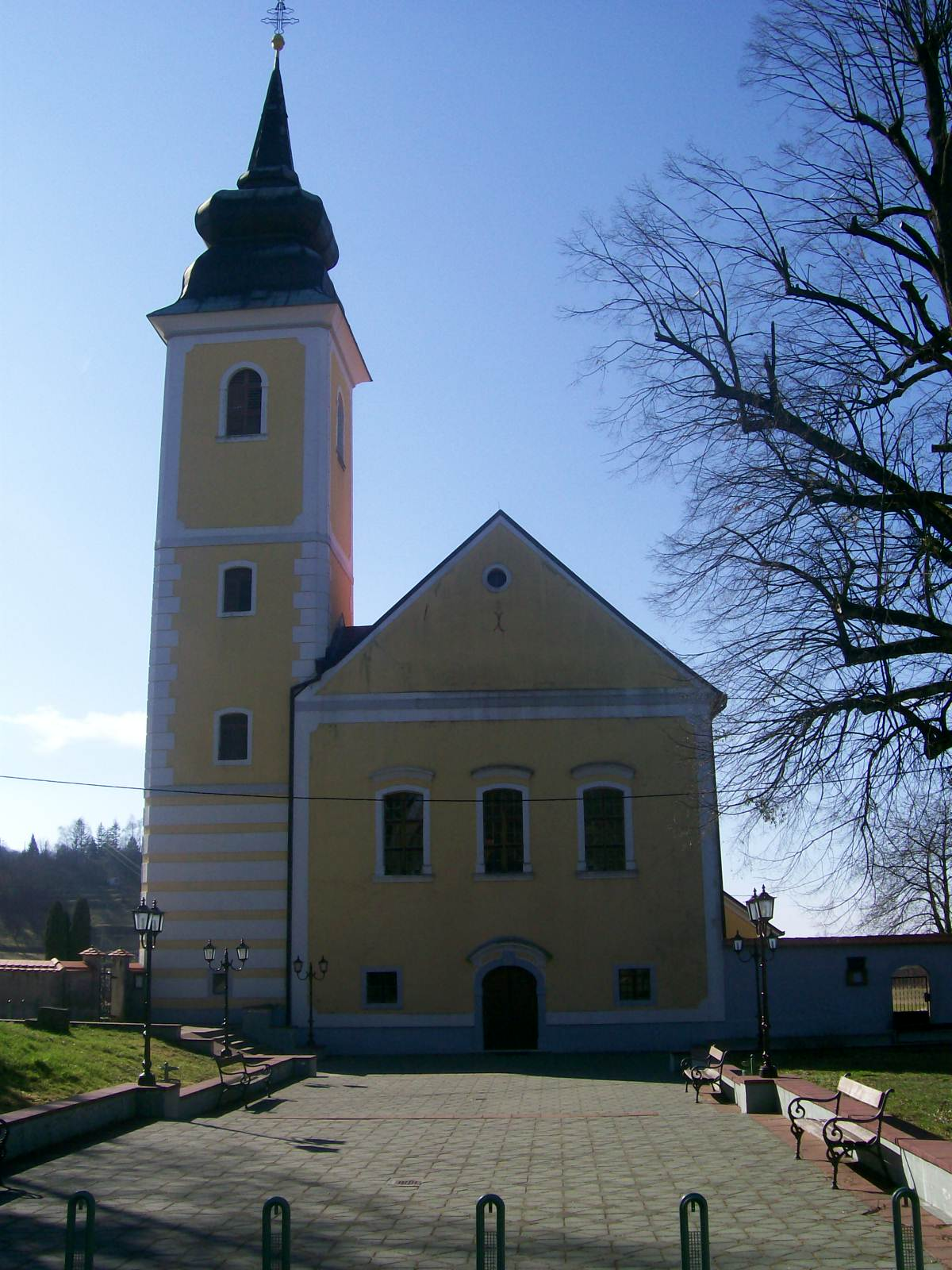
Church in Marija Gorica
