= Kríže =

- Municipality
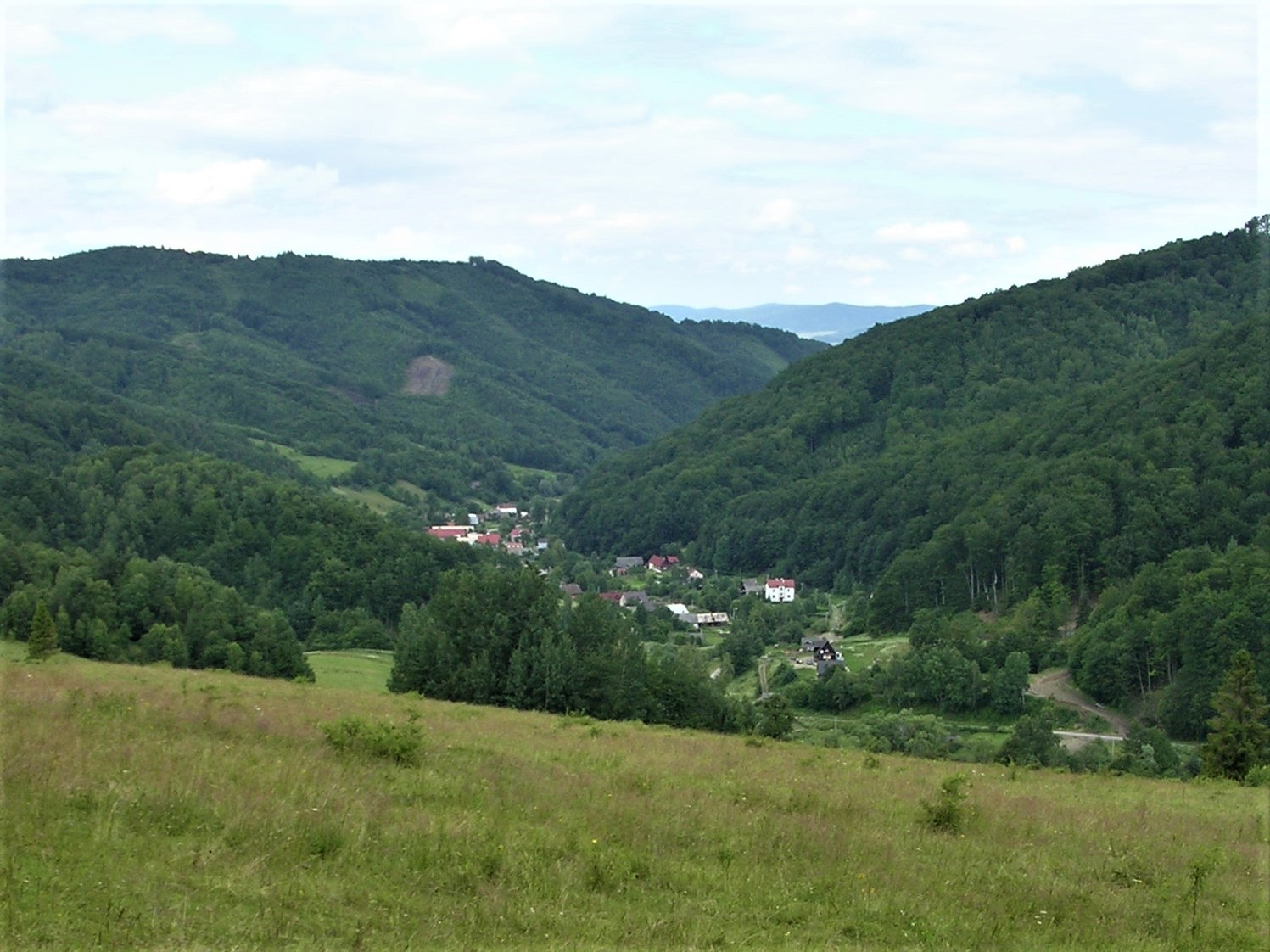

- Flag

- Location of Kríže in the Prešov Region Location of Kríže in Slovakia
- Coordinates: 49.24°N 21.15°E
- Country: Slovakia
- Region: Prešov Region
- District: Bardejov District
- First mentioned: 1635

Area
  - Total: 14.93 km^{2} (5.76 sq mi)
- Elevation: 560 m (1,840 ft)

Population (2025)
  - Total: 56
- Time zone: UTC+1 (CET)
  - Summer (DST): UTC+2 (CEST)
- Postal code: 860 4
- Area code: +421 54
- Vehicle registration plate (until 2022): BJ
- Website: www.obeckrize.sk

Kríže (German: Kreuz) is a village and municipality in Bardejov District in the Prešov Region of north-east Slovakia.

== History ==
In historical records the village was first mentioned in 1635.

== Geography ==
The municipality lies at an altitude of 560 metres (1,840 ft) and covers an area of 14.93 km^{2} (5.76 sq mi) (2025). It is 11 km (6.8 mi) southwest of Bardejov.

== Population ==
Population statistic (10 years)
Year	1995	2005	2015	2025
Count	64	77	74	56
Difference		+20.31%	−3.89%	−24.32%

Population statistic
Year	2024	2025
Count	56	56
Difference		−1.42%

It has a population of 56 people (31 December 2025).

=== Ethnicity ===
Census 2021 (1+ %)
Ethnicity	Number	Fraction
Slovak	61	95.31%
Rusyn	11	17.18%
Not found out	2	3.12%
Ukrainian	1	1.56%
Italian	1	1.56%
Total	64	

In year 2021 was 64 people by ethnicity 61 as Slovak, 11 as Rusyn, 2 as Not found out, 1 as Ukrainian and 1 as Italian.

Note on population: The difference values of population numbers in the table "Population statistic" and in the sections "Ethnicity" & "Religion" is caused by the use of various statistical methods.

=== Religion ===
Census 2021 (1+ %)
Religion	Number	Fraction
Greek Catholic Church	50	78.13%
Roman Catholic Church	10	15.63%
None	4	6.25%
Total	64	

In year 2021 was 64 people by religion 50 from Greek Catholic Church, 10 from Roman Catholic Church and 4 from None.
