= Tomaj =

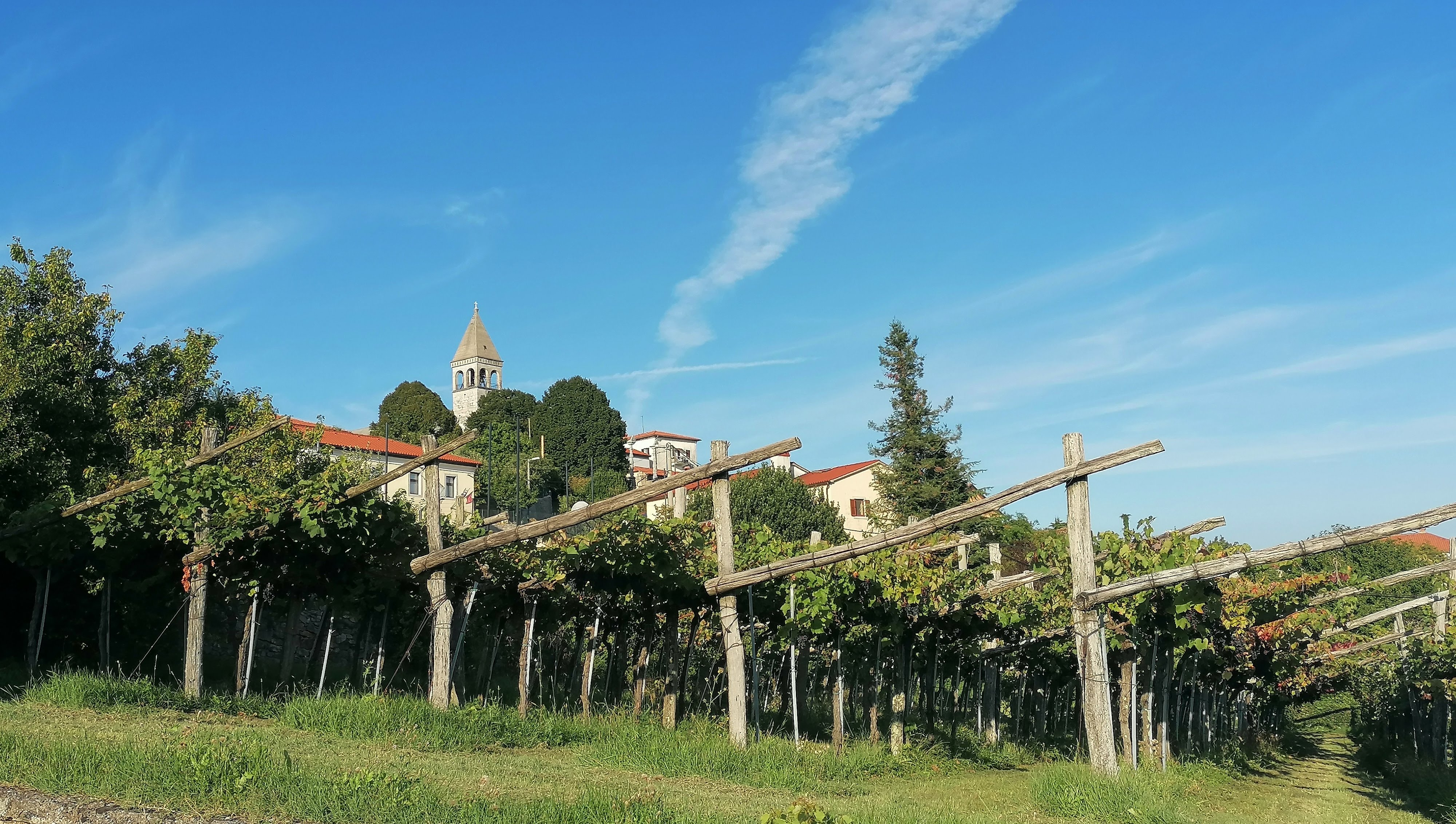

- Location in Slovenia
- Coordinates: 45°45′21.06″N 13°51′24.19″E
- Country: Slovenia
- Traditional region: Littoral
- Statistical region: Coastal–Karst
- Municipality: Sežana

Area
  - Total: 5.93 km^{2} (2.29 sq mi)
- Elevation: 362 m (1,188 ft)

Population (2002)
  - Total: 345

Tomaj (pronounced [ˈtoːmai̯] or [tɔˈmaːi̯]; Italian: Tomadio) is a village in the Municipality of Sežana in the Littoral region of Slovenia, near the border with Italy.

== Name ==
Tomaj was attested in historical sources as Thomay in 1494. The name of the village is probably derived from the personal name *Tom(a) (cf. the surnames Filipaj < Filip and Jakaj < Jakob). If so, the name originally designated a place where a person named Toma or Tome lived.

== Churches ==
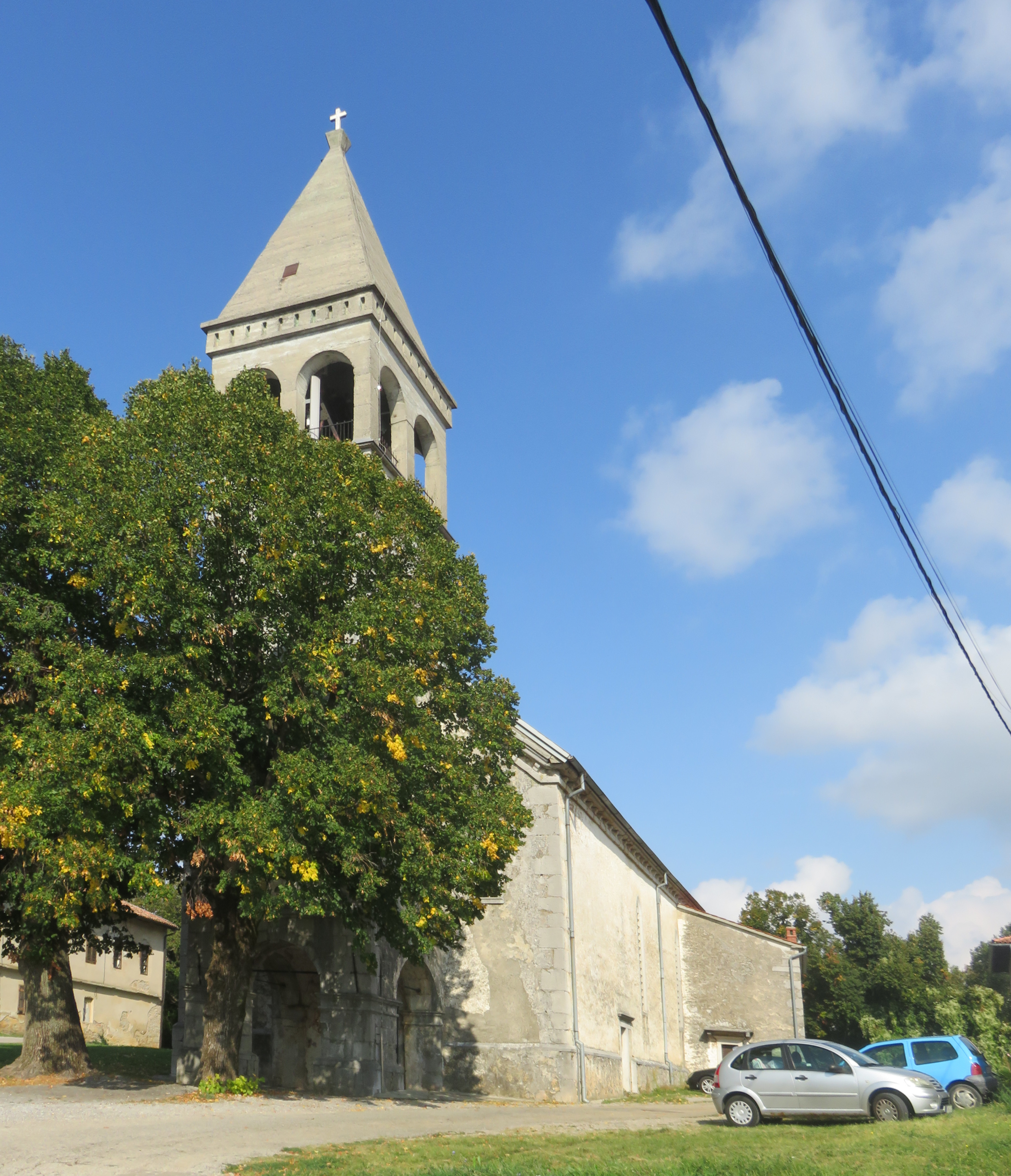
Saints Peter and Paul Church

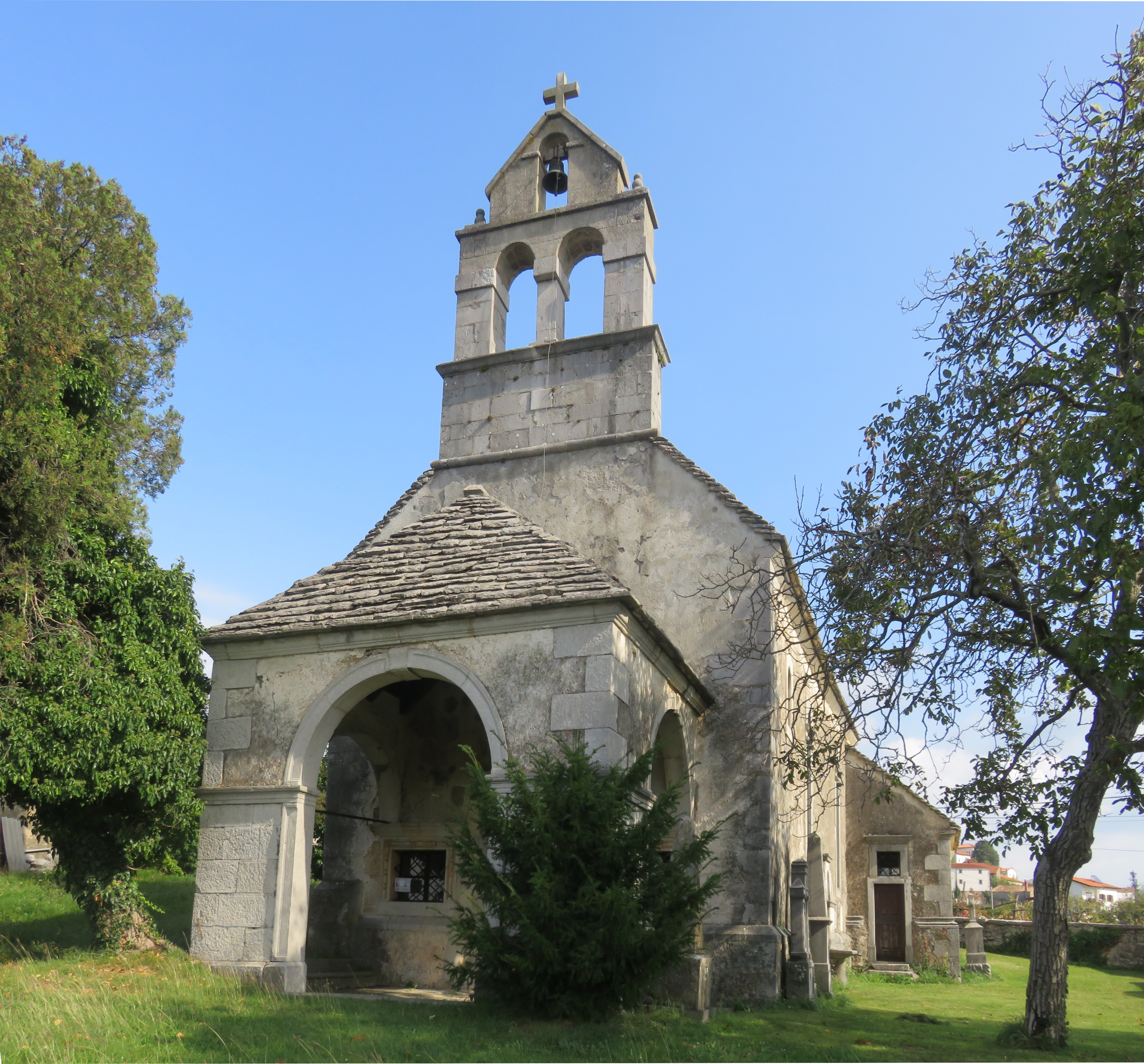
Saint Mary's Church

Churches in Tomaj

The parish church in the settlement is dedicated to Saints Peter and Paul and belongs to the Diocese of Koper. A second church is a small building next to the cemetery and is dedicated to the Virgin Mary.

== Climate ==
Tomaj has a warm climate for Slovenia. Winters are mild with frequent rain and clouds. Snow is rare and occurs only a few times each winter. Also, sub freezing highs happen just twice a year. Lows hit freezing 68 days annually. Summer's are warm and sunny. Despite being sunny, summers have a lot of rain, with thunderstorms being quite common. There are only 17 days over 30 degrees, and 70 over 25 degrees. Fall is the wettest time of year, and late winter is the driest. Means range from 2.1 in January to 20.8 in July. Tomaj's climate is classified as Cfb or oceanic.

Climate data for Tomaj, 1991–2020 normals, extremes 1951–2020
Month	Jan	Feb	Mar	Apr	May	Jun	Jul	Aug	Sep	Oct	Nov	Dec	Year
Record high °C (°F)	18.7 (65.7)	21.9 (71.4)	25 (77)	29 (84)	33 (91)	35.5 (95.9)	37.5 (99.5)	38.6 (101.5)	32.8 (91.0)	29 (84)	24.5 (76.1)	18.9 (66.0)	38.6 (101.5)
Mean daily maximum °C (°F)	7.6 (45.7)	9.1 (48.4)	13.0 (55.4)	17.2 (63.0)	21.9 (71.4)	26.0 (78.8)	28.6 (83.5)	28.7 (83.7)	23.1 (73.6)	17.8 (64.0)	12.6 (54.7)	8.5 (47.3)	17.8 (64.1)
Daily mean °C (°F)	3.1 (37.6)	3.8 (38.8)	7.3 (45.1)	11.3 (52.3)	15.6 (60.1)	19.6 (67.3)	21.8 (71.2)	21.6 (70.9)	16.7 (62.1)	12.2 (54.0)	8.0 (46.4)	4.1 (39.4)	12.1 (53.8)
Mean daily minimum °C (°F)	−0.1 (31.8)	−0.1 (31.8)	3.0 (37.4)	6.5 (43.7)	10.5 (50.9)	14.1 (57.4)	16.1 (61.0)	16.3 (61.3)	12.4 (54.3)	8.6 (47.5)	4.9 (40.8)	1.0 (33.8)	7.8 (46.0)
Record low °C (°F)	−17.7 (0.1)	−14.7 (5.5)	−11.5 (11.3)	−6.7 (19.9)	−1.3 (29.7)	3.7 (38.7)	5.9 (42.6)	5.7 (42.3)	−0.5 (31.1)	−4.4 (24.1)	−13.9 (7.0)	−13.1 (8.4)	−17.7 (0.1)
Average precipitation mm (inches)	87 (3.4)	92 (3.6)	88 (3.5)	89 (3.5)	110 (4.3)	111 (4.4)	95 (3.7)	104 (4.1)	155 (6.1)	146 (5.7)	169 (6.7)	131 (5.2)	1,377 (54.2)
Average snowfall cm (inches)	4 (1.6)	2 (0.8)	1 (0.4)	0 (0)	0 (0)	0 (0)	0 (0)	0 (0)	0 (0)	0 (0)	1 (0.4)	4 (1.6)	12 (4.8)
Average extreme snow depth cm (inches)	0.3 (0.1)	0.2 (0.1)	0 (0)	0 (0)	0 (0)	0 (0)	0 (0)	0 (0)	0 (0)	0 (0)	0 (0)	0.3 (0.1)	0.3 (0.1)
Average precipitation days (≥ 0.1 mm)	10	8	9	12	12	12	10	10	11	13	14	11	132
Average snowy days (≥ 1 cm)	1	0.5	0.2	0	0	0	0	0	0	0	0.1	0.4	2.2
Mean monthly sunshine hours	102	127	167	188	230	252	294	281	196	146	89	93	2,165
Source: Slovenian Environment Agency (ARSO)

== Notable people ==
Notable people that were born or lived in Tomaj include:

- Anton Černe (1813–1891), politician
- Urban Golmajer (1820–1905), priest, social care and education promoter, viticultural society founder
- Pavel Klapše (ca. 1688–1772), religious writer
- Pavel Knobl (1765–1830), poet and musician
- Srečko Kosovel (1904–1926), poet
- Matija Sila (1840–1925), regional historian
- Alojzij Šonc (1872–1958), composer
- Viktor Šonc (1878–1964), composer
