= Janovce, Bardejov District =

Janovce
- Village
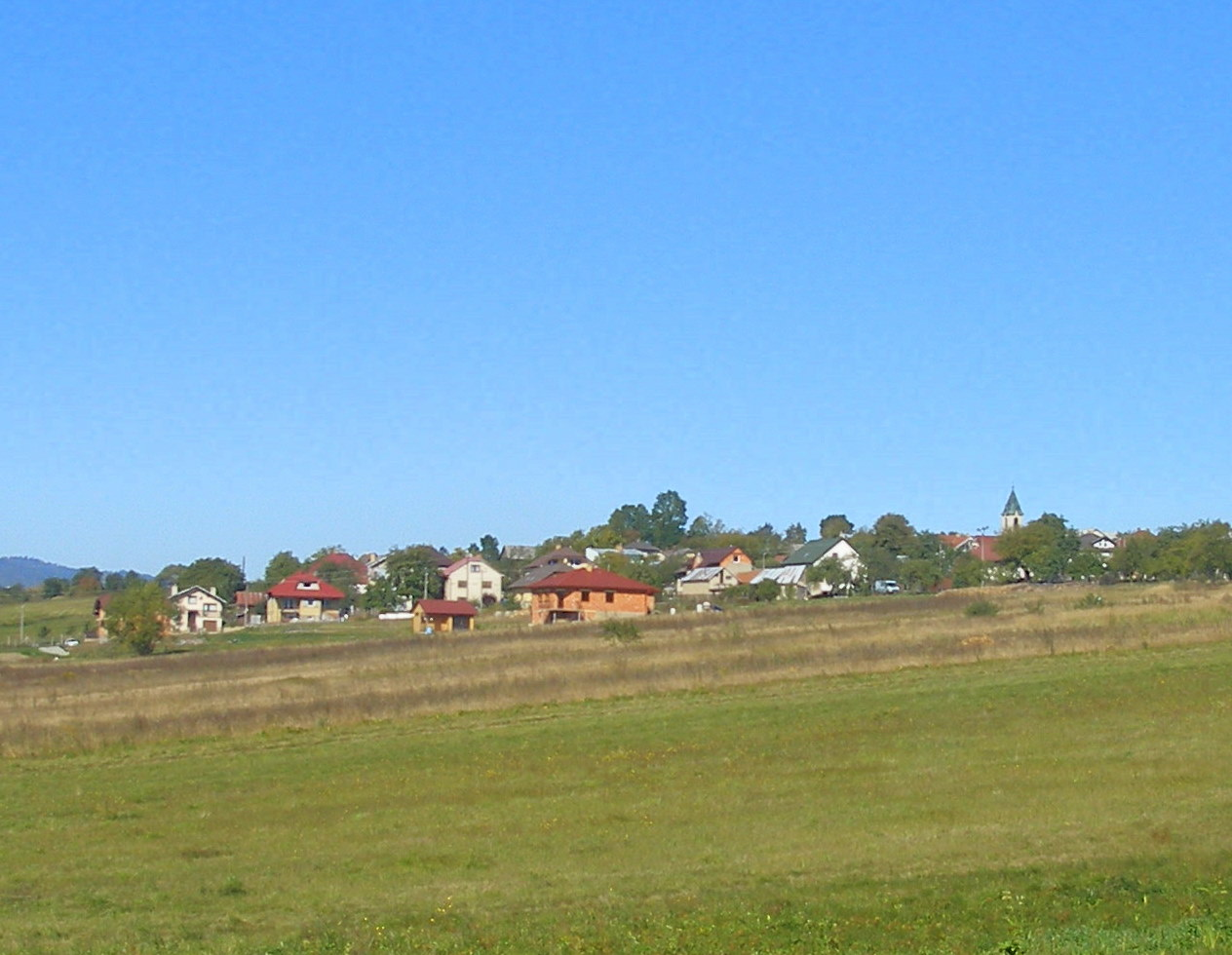

- Location of Janovce in the Prešov Region Location of Janovce in Slovakia
- Coordinates: 49°11′25″N 21°18′16″E
- Country: Slovakia
- Region: Prešov
- District: Bardejov
- First mentioned: 1261

Area
  - Total: 5.53 km^{2} (2.14 sq mi)
- Elevation: 366 m (1,201 ft)

Population (2025)
  - Total: 492
  - Density: 12.42/km^{2} (32.17/sq mi)
- Time zone: UTC+1 (CET)
  - Summer (DST): UTC+2 (CEST)
- Postal code: 086 41
- Area code: +421 54
- Vehicle registration plate (until 2022): BJ
- Website: janovcebj.sk

Janovce (German: Johannsdorf, meaning John's village, Hungarian: Bérczalja) is a village and municipality in Bardejov District in the Prešov Region of north-east Slovakia.

== History ==
In historical records the village was first mentioned in 1261.

== Geography ==
The municipality lies at an altitude of 366 metres (1,201 ft) and covers an area of 5.53 km^{2} (2.14 sq mi) (2025).

== Population ==
Population statistic (10 years)
Year	1995	2005	2015	2025
Count	402	421	444	492
Difference		+4.72%	+5.46%	+10.81%

Population statistic
Year	2024	2025
Count	479	492
Difference		+2.71%

It has a population of 492 people (31 December 2025).

=== Ethnicity ===
Census 2021 (1+ %)
Ethnicity	Number	Fraction
Slovak	456	98.06%
Not found out	10	2.15%
Total	465	

In year 2021 was 465 people by ethnicity 456 as Slovak, 10 as Not found out, 2 as Czech, 1 as Irish, 1 as Rusyn, 1 as Russian and 1 as Other.

Note on population: The difference values of population numbers in the table "Population statistic" and in the sections "Ethnicity" & "Religion" is caused by the use of various statistical methods.

=== Religion ===
Census 2021 (1+ %)
Religion	Number	Fraction
Roman Catholic Church	413	88.82%
Evangelical Church	22	4.73%
Greek Catholic Church	12	2.58%
Not found out	9	1.94%
None	6	1.29%
Total	465	

In year 2021 was 465 people by religion 413 from Roman Catholic Church, 22 from Evangelical Church, 12 from Greek Catholic Church, 9 from Not found out, 6 from None, 2 from Christian Congregations in Slovakia and 1 from Ad hoc movements.

== Genealogical resources ==
The records for genealogical research are available at the state archive "Statny Archiv in Presov, Slovakia"

- Roman Catholic church records (births/marriages/deaths): 1755-1895 (parish B)
- Greek Catholic church records (births/marriages/deaths): 1800-1895 (parish B)
- Lutheran church records (births/marriages/deaths): 1747-1895 (parish B)

== See also ==
- List of municipalities and towns in Slovakia
